= List of Canadian television channels =

Television in Canada has many individual stations, networks, and systems.

== National broadcast television networks ==
=== English ===
- CBC Television, a national public network owned by the Canadian Broadcasting Corporation (CBC).
- Citytv, a privately owned television network owned by Rogers Sports & Media, with stations in Quebec, Ontario, Nova Scotia, Manitoba, Saskatchewan, Alberta and British Columbia.
- CTV, a national private network (except for Newfoundland and Labrador and the territories) owned by Bell Media.
- Global, a national private network (except for Newfoundland and Labrador and the territories) owned by Corus Entertainment.

=== French ===
- Ici Radio-Canada Télé, a national public network owned by the CBC's French-language division Société Radio-Canada.
- TVA, a privately owned television network owned by Groupe TVA.

=== Multilingual ===
- APTN, the first national Indigenous broadcaster in the world. Broadcasts in the three territories and cable network carried nationwide on cable and satellite. Programming focuses on Indigenous Peoples. It operates in English, French and various Aboriginal languages.

== Regional broadcast television systems ==
=== English ===
- CTV 2, a privately owned television system with stations in Ontario, Alberta, British Columbia, and Atlantic Canada. It is owned by Bell Media.
- Great West Television, a privately owned group of stations affiliated with CTV Two and Citytv in British Columbia.
- Yes TV, a group of three religious stations in Ontario and Alberta owned by Crossroads Christian Communications.
- indieNET, an arrangement CHCH (in Ontario), CHEK (in British Columbia), & CJON (in Newfoundland and Labrador), three independent broadcasters, have with Yes TV to sub-license some of Yes TV's programming

=== French ===
- Noovo, a privately owned television system based in Quebec owned by Bell Media.

=== Multilingual ===
- CFHD-DT, a privately owned multicultural station based in Montreal, using the on-air brand ICI (International Channel).
- OMNI, a group of five privately owned multicultural television stations in Ontario, Alberta and British Columbia owned by Rogers Media.

=== Defunct regional broadcast television systems ===
- A-Channel, a privately owned television system based in Alberta, Manitoba, and Toronto and owned by Craig Media.
- Baton Broadcast System, or BBS, a privately owned television system based in Ontario and Saskatchewan and owned by Baton Broadcasting.
- E!, a privately owned television system based in Quebec, Ontario, Alberta, and British Columbia and owned by Canwest.
- Joytv, a privately owned television system based in British Columbia and Manitoba and was owned by ZoomerMedia.
- Northern Television, similar in fashion to Great West Television, also in BC. Shared by two northern BC CBC Television affiliates.

== Regional broadcast television stations ==
=== English ===
- CHCH-DT, using the on-air brand CHCH - a privately owned television station in Hamilton owned by Channel Zero which airs local news & movies.
- CHEK-DT, using the on-air brand CHEK - a privately owned television station in Victoria owned by CHEK Media Group.
- CHNU-DT, using the on-air brand Joytv - a privately owned religious television station in Vancouver owned by ZoomerMedia.
- CIIT-DT, using the on-air brand Faith TV - a privately owned religious television station in Winnipeg owned by ZoomerMedia.
- CJIL-DT, using the on-air brand The Miracle Channel - a privately owned Christian television station in Lethbridge, Alberta owned by The Miracle Channel Association.
- CJON-DT, using the on-air brand NTV - a privately owned television station in Newfoundland & Labrador owned by Stirling Communications International.

== Community broadcast television stations ==
=== English ===
- CFSO-TV, Cardston, Alberta.
- CFTS-TV, Teslin, Yukon.
- CFTV-DT, Leamington, Ontario.
- CH5248, NeepawaManitoba.
- CHCO-TV, St. Andrews, New Brunswick.
- CHOB-TV, Hobbema, Alberta.
- CIHC-TV, Hay River, Northwest Territories.
- CIRE-TV, High Prairie, Alberta.
- CKER-TV, Kahnawake, Quebec
- VX9AMK, (using the on-air brand Star Ray TV), Toronto, Ontario.

=== French ===
- CHNE-TV, Chéticamp, Nova Scotia.
- CHMG-DT, Quebec City, Quebec.

=== Multilingual ===
- CIMC-TV, Arichat, Nova Scotia (English and French).
- CFHD-DT, A privately owned multicultural station based in Montreal, using the on-air brand ICI (International Channel/Canal International).

== Educational television stations ==
=== English ===
- Citytv Saskatchewan, a privately owned channel in Saskatchewan owned by Rogers Communications. Broadcasts a mix of educational, children's, and entertainment programs. Not available over-the-air, only available through cable throughout the province.
- CTV 2 Alberta, a privately owned channel in Alberta owned by Bell Media. Airs a mix of educational and entertainment programming. Not available over-the-air (though two stations relayed its programming over-the-air under the former Access branding until they were shut down in August 2011), only available through cable throughout the province.
- Knowledge Network, a publicly owned educational station in British Columbia owned by the Government of British Columbia. Limited availability over-the-air, but is available on cable throughout the province.
- TVO, a publicly owned educational station in Ontario owned by the Government of Ontario. Available over-the-air and on cable throughout the province.

=== French ===
- CFTU-DT, an educational station in Quebec owned by a private consortium known as Savoir Media, consisting primarily of Quebec-based post-secondary institutions. Broadcasts educational programming in Montreal over-the-air, but is available on cable throughout the rest of the province.
- Télé-Québec, a publicly owned educational station in Quebec owned by the Government of Quebec. Available over-the-air and on cable throughout the province. (CIVM-DT Montreal)
- TFO, a publicly owned educational station in Ontario owned by the Government of Ontario. Available on cable throughout the province, as well as in New Brunswick and Manitoba.

== Analogue cable specialty television channels ==
=== English ===
- BNN Bloomberg
- Bravo
- Cartoon Network
- CBC News Network
- CMT
- CP24
- CPAC
- CTV Comedy Channel
- CTV Drama Channel
- CTV Life Channel
- CTV News Channel
- CTV Sci-Fi Channel
- DTOUR
- E!
- Flavour Network
- History
- Home Network
- Much
- Showcase
- Slice
- Sportsnet
  - Sportsnet 360
  - Sportsnet East
  - Sportsnet Ontario
  - Sportsnet Pacific
  - Sportsnet West
- Treehouse TV
- TSN
  - TSN1
  - TSN2
  - TSN3
  - TSN4
  - TSN5
- USA Network
- VisionTV
- W Network
- The Weather Network
- YTV

=== French ===
- Canal D
- Canal Vie
- CPAC (French feed)
- Elle Fictions
- Évasion
- Historia
- ICI ARTV
- ICI RDI
- LCN
- Max
- MétéoMédia
- RDS
  - RDS2
- RDS Info
- SériesPlus
- Télétoon
- TV5 Québec Canada
- TV5 Unis
- Z

=== Multicultural ===
- ATN Star Plus
- Fairchild TV
- Odyssey
- Talentvision
- TLN

=== Teleshopping channels (exempt) ===
==== English ====
- TSC

=== Provincial parliamentary channels ===
==== English ====
- Alberta Legislature (Alberta)
- Hansard TV (British Columbia)
- House of Assembly Channel (Newfoundland and Labrador)
- Legislative Assembly of New Brunswick Television Service
- Legislative Television (Nova Scotia)
- Ontario Parliament Network
- Saskatchewan Legislative Network

==== French ====
- Canal de l'Assemblée nationale (Quebec)

== Premium television services ==
=== English ===
- Crave (Six multiplex channels)
  - Crave 1
  - Crave 2
  - Crave 3
  - Crave 4 (time-shifted feed of Crave 1)
  - HBO Canada 1 (East)
  - HBO Canada 2 (West)
- Starz Canada (Two multiplex channels)
  - Starz Canada 1
  - Starz Canada 2
- Super Channel (Four multiplex channels)
  - Super Channel Fuse
  - Super Channel Heart & Home
  - Super Channel Vault
  - Ginx eSports TV Canada

=== French ===
- Cinépop
- Super Écran (Four multiplex channels)
  - Super Écran 1
  - Super Écran 2
  - Super Écran 3
  - Super Écran 4

=== Multicultural ===
- ATN Aastha TV
- ATN Bangla

== Pay-per-view services ==
=== English ===
- SaskTel PPV
- Sportsnet PPV
- Vu!

=== French ===
- Canal Indigo
- Vu!

== Audio and/or text-only services ==
- AMI-audio (English)
- Broadcast News (English)
- Canal M (French)
- Real Estate Channel (English)
- Stingray Music

== Digital specialty television channels ==
=== English ===
- Adult Swim
- AMI-tv
- AOV Adult Movie Channel
- ATN Cricket Plus
- ATN DD Sports
- BBC Earth
- BBC First
- beIN Sports
- Boomerang
- Commonwealth Broadcasting Network
- Cottage Life
- Crime & Investigation
- CTV Nature Channel
- CTV Speed Channel
- CTV Wild Channel
- Daystar Television Canada
- DejaView
- Discovery Channel
- Disney Channel
- Dorcel TV Canada
- Exxxtasy TV
- FEVA TV
- Fight Network
- Food Network
- FX
- FXX
- Game+
- GameTV
- Global News: BC 1
- Goal TV
- HGTV
- History2
- Hollywood Suite 70s+ Movies
- Hollywood Suite 80s & 90s Movies
- Hollywood Suite 2000s Movies
- Hollywood Suite 2010s+ Movies
- HPItv (Four multiplex channels)
  - HPItv (flagship feed)
  - HPItv Canada
  - HPItv International
  - HPItv West
  - Iran TV Network
- Investigation Discovery
- Lifetime
- Love Nature
- Magnolia Network
- Makeful
- Maleflixxx Television
- MovieTime
- Nat Geo Wild
- National Geographic
- NBA TV Canada
- One
- OneSoccer
- OutTV
- Oxygen
- Penthouse TV
- Playmen TV
- Red Hot TV
- REV TV Canada
- Rewind
- RFD-TV Canada
- Salt + Light Television
- Silver Screen Classics
- Skinemax HD
- Smithsonian Channel
- Sportsman Channel
- Sportsnet One
  - Sportsnet Flames
  - Sportsnet Oilers
  - Sportsnet Vancouver Hockey
- Sportsnet World
- Stingray Country
- Stingray Juicebox
- Stingray Loud
- Stingray Naturescape
- Stingray Now 4K
- Stingray Retro
- Stingray Vibe
- T+E
- Terror TV (launch TBD)
- The Cowboy Channel Canada
- The Cult Movie Network
- The News Forum
- The Rural Channel
- Toon-A-Vision
- Vertical TV
- Vixen TV
- Water Television Network
- Wild TV
- Willow
- XITE 4K
- XXX Action Clips Channel

=== French ===
- aDDIK
- AMI-télé
- Avis de Recherche
- Casa
- Dorcel TV Canada
- Frissons TV
- ICI Explora
- Investigation
- Natyf TV
- PalmarèsADISQ par Stingray (music)
- Prise 2
- RDS2
- RDS Info
- Stingray Hits! (music)
- Témoin
- TVA Sports
  - TVA Sports 2
  - TVA Sports 3
- Zeste

=== Multicultural ===
- Aaj Tak
- Abu Dhabi TV
- Afroglobal Television
- Al Resalah
- All TV
- All TV K
- APTN
- ATN &TV
- ATN Aastha TV
- ATN ABP Sanjha
- ATN Alpha ETC Punjabi
- ATN ARY Digital
- ATN ARY News
- ATN ARY Musik
- ATN B4U Movies
- ATN B4U Music
- ATN B4U Plus
- ATN Bangla
- ATN Brit Asia TV
- ATN Colors
- ATN Colors Bangla
- ATN Colors Marathi
- ATN Colors Rishtey
- ATN DD Bharati
- ATN DD India
- ATN DD News
- ATN Food Food
- ATN Gujarati
- ATN Jaya TV
- ATN Life
- ATN Movies
- ATN MTV India
- ATN News
- ATN News 18
- ATN PM One
- ATN Punjabi
- ATN Punjabi 5
- ATN Punjabi News
- ATN Punjabi Plus
- ATN SAB TV
- ATN Sony Aath
- ATN Sony Max
- ATN Sony Max 2
- ATN Sony PAL
- ATN Sony TV
- ATN Sony Yay!
- ATN SVBC
- ATN Tamil Plus
- ATN Times Now
- ATN Urdu
- ATN Vijay Super
- ATN Vijay TV
- ATN Zee Punjabi
- ATN Zoom
- Canale IV
- CBN
- CCTV
- CMC TV
- CNTV
- Channel Punjabi
- Channel Y
- Desi Channel
- ERT World
- First National
- FPTV
- FTV
- Fairchild TV
- Fairchild TV 2 HD
- Filmy
- Greek Music Channel
- Halla Bol!
- Gurbaani TV
- HRT Sat
- Hum TV
- Inuit TV
- Israel+
- LS Times TV
- Mediaset Italia
- Mediaset TGCOM 24
- MEGA Cosmos
- Melody Aflam
- Melody Drama
- Melody Hits
- Momo Kids
- Montreal Greek TV
- NGTV
- News Only
- New Tang Dynasty Television
- Odyssey
- Only Music
- Prime Asia TV
- PTC Punjabi
- Punjabi TV Canada
- Rawal TV
- Rotana Aflam
- Rotana Cinema
- Rotana Classic
- Rotana Clip
- Rotana Drama
- Rotana Khalijiah
- Rotana Mousica
- RTS Sat
- RTVi
- Sanjha TV
- Schlager TV
- SSTV
- Tamil One
- Tamil Vision
- Telebimbi
- TeleNiños
- TET
- TLN
- Travelxp
- TVI International
- Univision Canada
- Uvagut TV
- VGN TV
- Vanakkam TV
- Win HD Caribbean
- WOWtv
- Zee Bangla
- Zee Bollywood
- Zee Cinema
- Zee Marathi
- Zee Punjab Haryana Himachal
- Zee Salaam
- Zee Tamil
- Zee TV Canada
- Zing

== Defunct Canadian specialty channels ==
- ABC Spark (March 26, 2012 - September 1, 2025)
- AIM Pay-Tv Corp. (February 1983 - c. summer 1984)
- Argent (February 21, 2005 - April 30, 2016)
- A.Side TV (October 1, 2009 - January 15, 2023)
- BBC Canada (September 7, 2001 - December 31, 2020)
- BBC Kids (November 5, 2001 - December 31, 2018)
- Bloomberg TV Canada (November 17, 2015 - October 5, 2017)
- bpm:tv (September 7, 2001 - June 1, 2015)
- Bollywood Times (November 28, 2011 - January 2018)
- BookTelevision (September 7, 2001 - February 21, 2021)
- Breakaway PPV (2000 - 2010)
  - Canucks TV
  - Flames PPV
  - Oilers PPV
- BuyNOW TV (summer 2014 - 2017)
- CBC Parliamentary Television Network (September 1979 - October 1992)
- C Channel (February 1, 1983 - June 30, 1983)
- Canadian Forces Radio and Television (unknown — April 2014)
- CityNews Channel (October 3, 2011 - June 30, 2013)
- Cooking Channel (September 7, 2001 - December 31, 2024)
- Comedy Gold (September 7, 2001 - September 1, 2019)
- CoolTV (September 4, 2003 - July 21, 2008)
- Cosmopolitan TV (February 14, 2008 - September 30, 2019)
- DealsTV (September 2014 - 2016/2017)
- Disney Junior (December 1, 2015 - September 1, 2025)
- Disney XD (December 1, 2015 - September 1, 2025)
- Documentary Channel (September 7, 2001 - September 1, 2026)
- Encore Avenue (October 1, 1995 - March 1, 2016)
- Edge TV (September 7, 2001 - July 15, 2003)
- ESPN Classic (September 7, 2001 - October 31, 2023)
- Family (September 1, 1988 - October 23, 2025)
- Family Jr. (November 30, 2007 - October 23, 2025)
- Fashion Television (September 7, 2001 - February 21, 2021)
- Fine Living (September 3, 2004 - October 19, 2009)
- Fox Sports World Canada (September 7, 2001 - April 30, 2012)
- FYI (September 7, 2001 - December 31, 2019)
- G4 (September 7, 2001 - August 31, 2017)
- Global Reality Channel (July 1, 2010 - November 1, 2012)
- GolTV (November 1, 2005 - August 31, 2015)
- HSTN (August 2002 - October 15, 2002)
- ichannel (September 7, 2001 - August 15, 2016)
- IDNR-TV (October 2, 2006 - 2020)
- IFC (August 15, 2001 - September 30, 2019)
- La Chaîne Disney (September 1, 2015 - September 1, 2025)
- Leafs Nation Network (September 7, 2001 - August 31, 2022)
- Leonardo World (June 15, 2005 - September 18, 2007)
- Melody Hits (October 2002 - April 28, 2013)
- Melody Aflam (January 2006 - April 28, 2013)
- Melody Drama (October 17, 2009 - April 28, 2013)
- Max Trax (unknown - October 2009)
- Mehndi TV (November 28, 2011 - January 2018)
- Movie Central (February 1, 1983 - March 1, 2016)
- MSNBC Canada (September 7, 2001 - December 1, 2004)
- MTV (September 1, 2000 - December 31, 2024)
- MTV2 (October 18, 2001 - March 29, 2024)
- Niagara News TV (February 7, 2011 - April 18, 2011)
- Nickelodeon (November 2, 2009 - September 1, 2025)
- NTV Canada (January 6, 2006 - November 2015)
- Nuevo Mundo (March 13, 2007 - December 1, 2015)
- Oprah Winfrey Network (September 1, 1999 - September 1, 2024)
- Persian Vision (unknown — January 2011)
- ProSiebenSat.1 Welt (June 2006 - December 2023)
- Radiotélévision des Forces canadiennes (unknown - April 2014)
- RTVi+ (November 9, 2004 - November 2009)
- Shaw PPV (1990 - 2023)
- Sens TV (pay-per-view service) (unknown - 2008)
- ShopTV Canada (1996 - November 2013)
- Sun News Network (April 18, 2011 - February 13, 2015)
- Sundance Channel (September 7, 2001 - March 1, 2018)
- TALC (1990 - 2023)
- TATV (1986 - August 19, 2008)
- Télé Achats (November 1, 1995 - August 1, 2012)
- Télémagino (July 5, 2010 - October 23, 2025)
- Teletoon Retro (October 1, 2007 - September 1, 2015)
- Télétoon Rétro (September 4, 2008 - September 1, 2015)
- The Ecology Channel
- The Life Channel (October 1985 - November 1986)
- The Pet Network (December 3, 2004 - May 2, 2016)
- Tonis (June 23, 2004 - February 23, 2009)
- TVOne Canada (September 14, 2010 - November 2015)
- TXT-TV (March 17, 2010 - December 2011)
- UTV Movies (December 2, 2011 - December 2012)
- Viceland (September 7, 2001 - March 31, 2018)
- Video Italia (June 15, 2005 - September 18, 2007)
- Vintage TV (October 20, 2016 - November 2018)
- Viewers Choice (September 5, 1991 - September 30, 2014)
- Vrak (September 1, 1988 - October 1, 2023)
- WildBrainTV (June 1, 2011 - October 23, 2025)
- WWE Network (August 12, 2014 - January 2, 2025)
- WTSN (September 7, 2001 - September 30, 2003)
- X-Treme Sports (September 7, 2001 - October 9, 2008)
- Yoopa (April 1, 2010 - January 11, 2024)

== See also ==
- List of television stations in Canada by call sign
- List of Canadian television networks
- List of Canadian specialty channels
- Category A services
- Category B services
- Category C services
- List of Quebec television channels
- List of foreign television channels available in Canada
- List of United States stations available in Canada
- Digital television in Canada
- Multichannel television in Canada
- List of Canadian stations available in the United States
- List of television stations in North America by media market
- List of defunct Canadian television stations
