= List of Canadian specialty channels =

The following is a list of Canadian specialty channels, premium television services, and most other channels not available via terrestrial television.

== English ==
=== Entertainment ===
- Adult Swim
- AMI-tv
- BBC First
- CTV Comedy Channel
- CTV Drama Channel
- CTV Sci-Fi Channel
- CMT
- Crime & Investigation
- DejaView
- DTour
- E!
- FEVA TV
- FX
- FXX
- Game+
- GameTV
- Much
- Oxygen
- Showcase
- USA Network
- W Network

=== Kids ===
- Boomerang
- Cartoon Network
- Disney Channel
- Toon-A-Vision
- Treehouse TV
- YTV

=== Factual ===
- BBC Earth
- CTV Nature Channel
- CTV Speed Channel
- CTV Wild Channel
- Discovery Channel
- History
- History2
- Investigation Discovery
- Love Nature
- Nat Geo Wild
- National Geographic
- Smithsonian Channel

=== Lifestyle ===
- Bravo
- Cottage Life
- CTV Life Channel
- Flavour Network
- Food Network
- HGTV
- Home Network
- Lifetime
- Magnolia Network
- Makeful
- One
- OUTtv
- RFD-TV
- Slice
- T+E
- The Rural Channel
- VisionTV
- Water Television Network

=== Movie channels ===
- MovieTime
- Rewind
- Silver Screen Classics
- The Cult Movie Network

==== Premium ====
- Crave
  - Crave 2
  - Crave 3
  - Crave 4 (2hr time-shifted feed of Crave 1)
- HBO Canada
  - HBO 2
- Starz Canada
  - Starz 2
- Hollywood Suite
  - 70s+ Movies
  - 80s & 90s Movies
  - 2000s Movies
  - 2010s+ Movies
- Super Channel
  - Super Channel Fuse
  - Super Channel Heart & Home
  - Super Channel Quest
  - Super Channel Vault

=== Music ===
- Stingray Country
- Stingray Juicebox
- Stingray Loud
- Stingray Retro
- Stingray Naturescape
- Stingray Now 4K
- Stingray Vibe
- XITE 4K

=== News, weather, and information ===
==== National ====
- BNN Bloomberg
- CBC News Network
- CPAC - English feed
- CTV News Channel
- The News Forum
- The Weather Network

==== Regional ====
- CP24
- Global News: BC 1

=== Premium adult services ===
- AOV Adult Movie Channel
- Dorcel TV Canada
- Exxxtasy TV
- Maleflixxx Television
- Penthouse TV
- Playmen TV
- Red Hot TV
- Skinemax HD
- Vixen TV
- XXX Action Clips Channel

=== Provincial parliamentary channels ===
- Hansard TV (British Columbia)
- House of Assembly Channel (Newfoundland & Labrador)
- Legislative Television (Nova Scotia)
- Ontario Parliament Network (Ontario)
- Saskatchewan Legislative Network (Saskatchewan)
- The Legislative Assembly of New Brunswick Television Service

=== Religious ===
- 3ABN Canada
- Daystar Television Canada
- Salt + Light Television
- Vertical TV

=== Shopping ===
- TSC

=== Sports ===
- ATN Cricket Plus
- ATN DD Sports
- beIN Sports
- The Cowboy Channel Canada
- Fight Network
- Goal TV
- HPItv
  - HPItv Canada
  - HPItv International
  - HPItv West
- NBA TV Canada
- OneSoccer
- REV TV Canada
- Sportsman Channel
- Sportsnet
  - Sportsnet East
  - Sportsnet Ontario
  - Sportsnet Pacific
  - Sportsnet West
- Sportsnet 360
- Sportsnet One
  - Sportsnet Flames
  - Sportsnet Oilers
  - Sportsnet Vancouver Hockey
- Sportsnet World
- The Sports Network
  - TSN2
  - TSN3
  - TSN4
  - TSN5
- Wild TV
- Willow Canada (cricket)

== French ==
=== Entertainment ===
- Addik
- Elle Fictions
- Max
- Prise 2
- SériesPlus
- TV5 Québec Canada
- Unis
- Z

=== Kids ===
- Télétoon

=== Factual ===
- Canal D
- Historia
- Ici ARTV
- Ici Explora
- Investigation
- Témoin

=== Lifestyle ===
- Casa
- Canal Vie
- Évasion
- Zeste

=== Movie channels ===
- Cinépop
- Frissons TV
- Super Écran
  - Super Écran 2
  - Super Écran 3
  - Super Écran 4

=== Music ===
- PalmarèsADISQ par Stingray
- Stingray Hits!

=== News, weather, and information ===
- Avis de Recherche
- CPAC - French feed
- LCN
- MétéoMédia
- Ici RDI

=== Premium adult services ===
- Dorcel TV Canada

=== Provincial parliamentary channels ===
- Canal de l'Assemblée nationale (Quebec)

=== Religious ===
- 3ABN Français

=== Sports ===
- RDS
  - RDS2
- RDS Info
- TVA Sports
  - TVA Sports 2

== Multicultural ==
- Aaj Tak
- Abu Dhabi TV
- Afroglobal Television
- Al Resalah
- All TV
- All TV K
- APTN
- ATN &TV
- ATN Aastha TV
- ATN ABP Sanjha
- ATN Alpha ETC Punjabi
- ATN ARY Digital
- ATN ARY News
- ATN ARY Musik
- ATN B4U Movies
- ATN B4U Music
- ATN B4U Plus
- ATN Bangla
- ATN Colors
- ATN Colors Bangla
- ATN Colors Marathi
- ATN Colors Rishtey
- ATN DD Bharati
- ATN DD India
- ATN DD News
- ATN Food Food
- ATN Gujarati
- ATN Jaya TV
- ATN Life
- ATN Movies
- ATN MTV India
- ATN News
- ATN News 18
- ATN PM One
- ATN Punjabi
- ATN Punjabi 5
- ATN Punjabi News
- ATN Punjabi Plus
- ATN SAB TV
- ATN Sony Aath
- ATN Sony Max
- ATN Sony Max 2
- ATN Sony PAL
- ATN Sony TV
- ATN Sony Yay!
- ATN Star Plus
- ATN SVBC
- ATN Tamil Plus
- ATN Times Now
- ATN Urdu
- ATN Vijay Super
- ATN Vijay TV
- ATN Zee Punjabi
- ATN Zoom
- BBC Arabic
- CBN
- Canale IV
- CCTV
- CMC TV
- CNTV
- Channel Punjabi
- Channel Y
- ERT World
- First National
- FPTV
- FTV
- Fairchild TV
- Fairchild TV 2 HD
- Filmy
- Greek Music Channel
- Halla Bol!
- HRT Sat
- Hum TV
- Inuit TV
- Israel+
- LS Times TV
- Mediaset Italia
- Mediaset TGCOM24
- MEGA Cosmos
- Melody Aflam
- Melody Drama
- Melody Hits
- Momo Kids
- Montreal Greek TV
- NGTV
- New Tang Dynasty Television
- News Only
- Odyssey
- Only Music
- Prime Asia TV
- PTC Punjabi
- Rawal TV
- Rotana Aflam
- Rotana Cinema
- Rotana Classic
- Rotana Clip
- Rotana Drama
- Rotana Khalijiah
- Rotana Mousica
- RTS Sat
- RTVi
- Sanjha TV
- Schlager TV
- SSTV
- Tamil One
- Tamil Vision
- Talentvision
- Telebimbi
- TeleNiños
- TET
- TLN
- Travelxp
- TVI International
- Univision Canada
- VGN TV
- Vanakkam TV
- Win HD Caribbean
- WOWtv
- Zee Bangla
- Zee Bollywood
- Zee Cinema
- Zee Marathi
- Zee Punjab Haryana Himachal
- Zee Talkies
- Zee Tamil
- Zee TV Canada
- Zing

== Defunct cable/satellite networks ==
- A.Side TV
- ABC Spark
- Action
- Argent
- ATN NDTV 24x7
- BBC Canada
- BBC Kids
- Bloomberg TV Canada
- BookTelevision
- bpm:tv
- Bollywood Times
- BuyNOW TV
- CBC Parliamentary Television Network
- C Channel
- CityNews Channel
- Comedy Gold
- Cooking Channel
- CoolTV
- Cosmopolitan TV
- DealsTV
- Discovery Kids
- Disney Jr.
- Disney XD
- Documentary Channel
- Dusk
- The Ecology Channel
- Edge TV
- Encore Avenue
- ESPN Classic
- Family Channel
- Family Jr.
- Fashion Television
- Fine Living
- Fox Sports World Canada
- FYI
- G4
- Global Reality Channel
- GolTV
- HSTN
- ichannel
- IFC
- Iran TV Network
- La Chaîne Disney
- Leafs Nation Network
- Leonardo World
- The Life Channel
- M3
- MEGA Cosmos (ECG)
- Mehndi TV
- Movie Central
- MSNBC Canada
- MTV
- MTV2
- Niagara News TV
- Nickelodeon
- Nuevo Mundo Television
- Oprah Winfrey Network
- The Pet Network
- Persian Vision
- ProSiebenSat.1 Welt
- RBTI Canada
- RTVi+
- ShopTV Canada
- Sun News Network
- Sundance Channel
- Talentvision 2 HD
- TATV
- Télé Achats
- Télémagino
- Teletoon Retro
- Télétoon Rétro
- Tonis
- TVOne Canada
- UTV Movies
- Viceland
- Video Italia
- Vintage TV
- Vrak
- WildBrainTV
- WTSN
- WWE Network
- X-Treme Sports
- Yoopa

== See also ==
- List of Canadian television channels
- Category A services
- Category B services
- Category C services
- List of foreign television channels available in Canada
- List of United States stations available in Canada
