= List of South Asian television channels by country =

This is a list of South Asian-origin television channels available on cable, satellite and IPTV platforms in Australia, Canada, Malaysia, the Middle East, Singapore, Trinidad and Tobago, the United Kingdom and the United States. Channels broadcasting from different regions of India, Pakistan and Bangladesh are available in Bengali, English, Gujarati, Hindi, Bhojpuri, Kannada, Malayalam, Marathi, Odia, Punjabi, Tamil, Telugu and Urdu.

== List of channels ==
=== Canada ===
Network	Origin of programming	Language	Genre	Service
Aaj Tak	India	Hindi	News	Bell Fibe TV
Aaj Tak	India	Hindi	News	Cogeco Cable
Aaj Tak	India	Hindi	News	Rogers Cable
Aapka Colors	India	Hindi	General	Bell Fibe TV
Aapka Colors	India	Hindi	General	Bell Satellite TV
Aapka Colors	India	Hindi	General	Cogeco Cable
Aapka Colors	India	Hindi	General	Rogers Cable
Aapka Colors	India	Hindi	General	Shaw Cable
Aapka Colors	India	Hindi	General	Telus TV
Aastha	India	Hindi	Religious	Bell Fibe TV
Aastha	India	Hindi	Religious	Cogeco Cable
Aastha	India	Hindi	Religious	Rogers Cable
Aastha	India	Hindi	Religious	Telus TV
ABP News	India	Hindi	News	Bell Fibe TV
ABP News	India	Hindi	News	Cogeco Cable
ABP News	India	Hindi	News	Rogers Cable
ABP News	India	Hindi	News	Telus TV
ARY Digital	Pakistan	Urdu	General	Bell Fibe TV
ARY Digital	Pakistan	Urdu	General	Bell Satellite TV
ARY Digital	Pakistan	Urdu	General	Rogers Cable
ARY Musik	Pakistan	Urdu	Music	Bell Fibe TV
ARY Musik	Pakistan	Urdu	Music	Rogers Cable
ARY News	Pakistan	Urdu	News	Bell Fibe TV
ARY News	Pakistan	Urdu	News	Rogers Cable
ARY QTV	Pakistan	Urdu	Religious	Bell Fibe TV
ARY QTV	Pakistan	Urdu	Religious	Rogers Cable
ARY Zauq	Pakistan	Urdu	Lifestyle	Bell Fibe TV
ARY Zauq	Pakistan	Urdu	Lifestyle	Rogers Cable
ATN Bangla	Canada	Bengali	General	Bell Fibe TV
ATN Bangla	Canada	Bengali	General	Cogeco Cable
ATN Bangla	Canada	Bengali	General	Rogers Cable
ATN Channel	Canada	Hindi	General	Bell Fibe TV
ATN Channel	Canada	Hindi	General	Bell Satellite TV
ATN Channel	Canada	Hindi	General	Cogeco Cable
ATN Channel	Canada	Hindi	General	Rogers Cable
ATN Channel	Canada	Hindi	General	Shaw Cable
ATN Channel	Canada	Hindi	General	Telus TV
ATN Cricket Plus	Canada	English	Cricket	Bell Fibe TV
ATN Cricket Plus	Canada	English	Cricket	Rogers Cable
ATN Cricket Plus	Canada	English	Cricket	Shaw Cable
ATN Cricket Plus	Canada	English	Cricket	Telus TV
ATN Gujarati	Canada	Gujarati	General	Bell Fibe TV
ATN Gujarati	Canada	Gujarati	General	Cogeco Cable
ATN Gujarati	Canada	Gujarati	General	Rogers Cable
ATN Movies	India	Hindi	Movies	Bell Fibe TV
ATN Movies	India	Hindi	Movies	Cogeco Cable
ATN Movies	India	Hindi	Movies	Rogers Cable
ATN Movies	India	Hindi	Movies	Telus TV
ATN News	India	English	News	Bell Fibe TV
ATN News	India	English	News	Bell Satellite TV
ATN News	India	English	News	Cogeco Cable
ATN News	India	English	News	Rogers Cable
ATN News	India	English	News	Shaw Cable
ATN News	India	English	News	Telus TV
ATN PM One	India	Punjabi	Music	Bell Fibe TV
ATN PM One	India	Punjabi	Music	Cogeco Cable
ATN PM One	India	Punjabi	Music	Rogers Cable
ATN PM One	India	Punjabi	Music	Shaw Cable
ATN PM One	India	Punjabi	Music	Telus TV
ATN Punjabi	India	Punjabi	General	Bell Fibe TV
ATN Punjabi	India	Punjabi	General	Bell Satellite TV
ATN Punjabi	India	Punjabi	General	Cogeco Cable
ATN Punjabi	India	Punjabi	General	Rogers Cable
ATN Punjabi	India	Punjabi	General	Shaw Cable
ATN Punjabi	India	Punjabi	General	Telus TV
ATN Punjabi 5	Canada	Punjabi	General	Bell Fibe TV
ATN Punjabi 5	Canada	Punjabi	General	Cogeco Cable
ATN Punjabi 5	Canada	Punjabi	General	Rogers Cable
ATN Punjabi Plus	Canada	Punjabi	General	Bell Fibe TV
ATN Punjabi Plus	Canada	Punjabi	General	Cogeco Cable
ATN Punjabi Plus	Canada	Punjabi	General	Rogers Cable
ATN Punjabi Plus	Canada	Punjabi	General	Telus TV
ATN Sports	Canada	Hindi	Cricket	Bell Fibe TV
ATN Sports	Canada	Hindi	Cricket	Rogers Cable
ATN Tamil Plus	India	Tamil	General	Bell Fibe TV
ATN Tamil Plus	India	Tamil	General	Cogeco Cable
ATN Tamil Plus	India	Tamil	General	Rogers Cable
ATN Urdu	Canada	Urdu	General	Bell Fibe TV
ATN Urdu	Canada	Urdu	General	Bell Satellite TV
ATN Urdu	Canada	Urdu	General	Cogeco Cable
ATN Urdu	Canada	Urdu	General	Rogers Cable
ATN Urdu	Canada	Urdu	General	Shaw Cable
ATN Urdu	Canada	Urdu	General	Telus TV
B4U Movies	India	Hindi	Movies	Bell Fibe TV
B4U Movies	India	Hindi	Movies	Bell Satellite TV
B4U Movies	India	Hindi	Movies	Cogeco Cable
B4U Movies	India	Hindi	Movies	Rogers Cable
B4U Movies	India	Hindi	Movies	Shaw Cable
B4U Movies	India	Hindi	Movies	Telus TV
B4U Music	India	Hindi	Music	Bell Fibe TV
B4U Music	India	Hindi	Music	Cogeco Cable
B4U Music	India	Hindi	Music	Rogers Cable
B4U Music	India	Hindi	Music	Telus TV
Big Magic International	India	Hindi	General	Bell Fibe TV
Big Magic International	India	Hindi	General	Bell Satellite TV
Big Magic International	India	Hindi	General	Cogeco Cable
Big Magic International	India	Hindi	General	Rogers Cable
Big Magic International	India	Hindi	General	Telus TV
BritAsia TV	Canada	English	General	Bell Fibe TV
Channel i	Bangladesh	Bengali	General	Bell Fibe TV
Channel i	Bangladesh	Bengali	General	Cogeco Cable
Channel i	Bangladesh	Bengali	General	Rogers Cable
Channel Punjabi	Canada	Punjabi	General	Bell Fibe TV
Channel Punjabi	Canada	Punjabi	General	Rogers Cable
Channel Punjabi	Canada	Punjabi	General	Shaw Cable
Channel Y	Canada	Urdu	General	Bell Fibe TV
Channel Y	Canada	Urdu	General	Rogers Cable
Cine Bangla	Canada	Bengali	Movies	Bell Fibe TV
Filmy	India	Hindi	Movies	Bell Fibe TV
Filmy	India	Hindi	Movies	Bell Satellite TV
Filmy	India	Hindi	Movies	Rogers Cable
Food Food	India	Hindi	Lifestyle	Bell Fibe TV
Food Food	India	Hindi	Lifestyle	Cogeco Cable
Food Food	India	Hindi	Lifestyle	Rogers Cable
Geo TV	Pakistan	Urdu	General	Bell Fibe TV
Geo TV	Pakistan	Urdu	General	Bell Satellite TV
Geo TV	Pakistan	Urdu	General	Cogeco Cable
Geo TV	Pakistan	Urdu	General	Rogers Cable
Hum TV	Pakistan	Urdu	General	Bell Fibe TV
Hum TV	Pakistan	Urdu	General	Cogeco Cable
Hum TV	Pakistan	Urdu	General	Rogers Cable
India Today	India	Hindi	News	Bell Fibe TV
India Today	India	Hindi	News	Rogers Cable
Jaya TV	India	Tamil	General	Bell Fibe TV
Jaya TV	India	Tamil	General	Bell Satellite TV
Jaya TV	India	Tamil	General	Cogeco Cable
Jaya TV	India	Tamil	General	Rogers Cable
Jaya TV	India	Tamil	General	Shaw Cable
Jaya TV	India	Tamil	General	Telus TV
KTV	India	Tamil	Movies	Rogers Cable Bell Fibe TV
Masala TV	Pakistan	Urdu	Lifestyle	Bell Fibe TV
NDTV 24x7	India	English	News	Bell Fibe TV
NDTV 24x7	India	English	News	Bell Satellite TV
NDTV 24x7	India	English	News	Cogeco Cable
NDTV 24x7	India	English	News	Rogers Cable
NDTV 24x7	India	English	News	Shaw Cable
NDTV 24x7	India	English	News	Telus TV
NDTV Good Times	India	English	Lifestyle	Bell Fibe TV
NDTV Good Times	India	English	Lifestyle	Cogeco Cable
NDTV Good Times	India	English	Lifestyle	Rogers Cable
NTV Bangla	Bangladesh	Bengali	General	Bell Fibe TV
NTV Bangla	Bangladesh	Bengali	General	Cogeco Cable
NTV Bangla	Bangladesh	Bengali	General	Rogers Cable
PTC Punjabi	India	Punjabi	General	Bell Fibe TV
PTC Punjabi	India	Punjabi	General	Bell Satellite TV
PTC Punjabi	India	Punjabi	General	Rogers Cable
PTC Punjabi	India	Punjabi	General	Shaw Cable
PTV Global	Pakistan	Urdu	General	Bell Fibe TV
Rishtey	Canada	Hindi	General	Bell Fibe TV
Rishtey	Canada	Hindi	General	Rogers Cable
SAB	India	Hindi	General	Bell Fibe TV
SAB	India	Hindi	General	Cogeco Cable
SAB	India	Hindi	General	Rogers Cable
SAB	India	Hindi	General	Shaw Cable
SAB	India	Hindi	General	Telus TV
Sahara One	India	Hindi	General	Bell Fibe TV
Sahara One	India	Hindi	General	Rogers Cable
SET Max	India	Hindi	Movies	Bell Fibe TV
SET Max	India	Hindi	Movies	Cogeco Cable
SET Max	India	Hindi	Movies	Rogers Cable
SET Max	India	Hindi	Movies	Telus TV
Sikh Channel	Canada	Punjabi	Religious	Bell Fibe TV
Sony Aath	India	Bengali	Movies	Bell Fibe TV
Sony Aath	India	Bengali	Movies	Cogeco Cable
Sony Aath	India	Bengali	Movies	Rogers Cable
SET Asia	India	Hindi	General	Bell Fibe TV
SET Asia	India	Hindi	General	Bell Satellite TV
SET Asia	India	Hindi	General	Cogeco Cable
SET Asia	India	Hindi	General	Rogers Cable
SET Asia	India	Hindi	General	Shaw Cable
SET Asia	India	Hindi	General	Telus TV
Sony Mix	India	Hindi	Music	Bell Fibe TV
SSTV	Canada	Punjabi	General	Bell Fibe TV
SSTV	Canada	Punjabi	General	Cogeco Cable
SSTV	Canada	Punjabi	General	Rogers Cable
Sun TV	India	Tamil	General	Bell Fibe TV
Sun TV	India	Tamil	General	Rogers Cable
Tamil One	Canada	Tamil	General	Bell Fibe TV
Tamil One	Canada	Tamil	General	Rogers Cable
Tamil Vision	Canada	Tamil	General	Bell Fibe TV
Tamil Vision	Canada	Tamil	General	Bell Satellite TV
Tamil Vision	Canada	Tamil	General	Rogers Cable
TET HD	Canada	Tamil	General	Bell Fibe TV
TET HD	Canada	Tamil	General	Rogers Cable
Times Now	India	English	News	Bell Fibe TV
Times Now	India	English	News	Cogeco Cable
Times Now	India	English	News	Rogers Cable
Times Now	India	English	News	Telus TV
Zee Bangla	India	Bengali	General	Bell Fibe TV
Zee Bollywood HD	India	Hindi	General	Bell Fibe TV
Zee Cinema	India	Hindi	Movies	Bell Fibe TV
Zee Cinema	India	Hindi	Movies	Cogeco Cable
Zee Cinema	India	Hindi	Movies	Rogers Cable
Zee Cinema	India	Hindi	Movies	Telus TV
Zee Punjabi	India	Punjabi	General	Bell Fibe TV
Zee Salaam	India	Urdu	General	Bell Fibe TV
Zee Salaam	India	Urdu	General	Cogeco Cable
Zee Tamil	India	Tamil	General	Bell Fibe TV
Zee Tamil	India	Tamil	General	Cogeco Cable
Zee Tamil	India	Tamil	General	Rogers Cable
Zee TV	India	Hindi	General	Bell Fibe TV
Zee TV	India	Hindi	General	Bell Satellite TV
Zee TV	India	Hindi	General	Cogeco Cable
Zee TV	India	Hindi	General	Rogers Cable
Zee TV	India	Hindi	General	Shaw Cable
Zee TV	India	Hindi	General	Telus TV
Zing	India	Hindi	Music	Bell Fibe TV
Zing	India	Hindi	Music	Rogers Cable
Zoom	India	Hindi	General	Bell Fibe TV
Zoom	India	Hindi	General	Cogeco Cable
Zoom	India	Hindi	General	Rogers Cable
Zoom	India	Hindi	General	Telus TV

=== Hong Kong ===
Network	Origin of programming	Language	Genre	Service
&TV	India	Hindi	General	Now TV
Colors	India	Hindi	General	Now TV
MTV India	India	Hindi	Music	Now TV
SET	India	Hindi	General	Now TV
SET Max	India	Hindi	Movies/Cricket	Now TV
Sony SAB	India	Hindi	Comedy	Now TV
Sony MIX	India	Hindi	Music	Now TV
Vijay	India	Tamil	General	Now TV
Star Plus	India	Hindi	General	Now TV
Star Gold	India	Hindi	Movies/Cricket	Now TV
Star Bharat	India	Hindi	Drama	Now TV
Zee TV	India	Hindi	General	Now TV
Zee TV	India	Hindi	General	Cable TV Hong Kong
Zee Cinema	India	Hindi	Movies/Cricket	Now TV
Zee Cinema	India	Hindi	Movies/Cricket	Cable TV Hong Kong
Zee News	India	Hindi	News	Now TV
Zee News	India	Hindi	News	Cable TV Hong Kong
Zee Telugu	India	Telugu	General	Now TV
Zee Tamil	India	Tamil	General	Now TV
Zing	India	Hindi	Music	Cable TV Hong Kong

=== Malaysia ===
Network	Origin of programming	Language	Genre	Service
Adithya	India	Tamil	Comedy	Astro
Astro Vaanavil	Malaysia	Tamil Telugu	General	Astro
Astro Vellithirai	Malaysia	Tamil Telugu	Movies	Astro
Gemini TV	India	Telugu	General	Astro
Chutti TV	India	Tamil	Kids	Astro
Jaya Max	India	Tamil	Music	Hypp.TV
Jaya TV	India	Tamil	General	Astro
Kalaignar	India	Tamil	General	Astro
Makkal TV	India	Tamil	General	Astro
Polimer TV	India	Tamil	General	Hypp.TV
SET	India	Hindi	General	Hypp.TV
SET Max	India	Hindi	Movies/Cricket	Hypp.TV
Sony SAB	India	Hindi	Comedy	Hypp.TV
Sun Music	India	Tamil	Music	Astro
Sun TV	India	Tamil	General	Astro
UTV Movies	India	Hindi	Movies	Hypp.TV
Vijay	India	Tamil	General	Astro
Star Plus	India	Hindi	General	Astro
Star Gold	India	Hindi	Movies/Cricket	Astro
Star Bharat	India	Hindi	Drama	Astro
Tara HD	India	Hindi	General	Astro
Zee TV	India	Hindi	General	Hypp.TV
Zee Cinema	India	Hindi	Movies/Cricket	Hypp.TV
Zee Telugu	India	Telugu	General	Hypp.TV
Zee Tamil	India	Tamil	General	Hypp.TV

=== Middle East ===
Network	Origin of programming	Language	Genre	Service
ABP News	India	Hindi	News	OSN
ARY Digital	Pakistan	Urdu	General	OSN
ARY News	Pakistan	Urdu	News	OSN
Asianet	India	Malayalam	General	OSN
Asianet News	India	Malayalam	News	OSN
Colors	India	Hindi	General	OSN
Dunya News	Pakistan	Urdu	General	OSN
Gemini TV	India	Telugu	General	OSN
Geo	Pakistan	Urdu	General	OSN
Geo News	Pakistan	Urdu	News	OSN
Express Entertainment	Pakistan	Urdu	News	OSN
Express News (Pakistan)	Pakistan	Urdu	News	OSN
Hum News	Pakistan	Urdu	News	OSN
Hum TV	Pakistan	Urdu	General	OSN
Samaa TV	Pakistan	Urdu	News	OSN
Jaya TV	India	Tamil	General	OSN
Kairali	India	Malayalam	General	OSN
Star Bharat	India	Hindi	General	OSN
MTV India	India	Hindi	Music	OSN
NDTV 24x7	India	English	News	OSN
SET Max	India	Hindi	Movies	OSN
Sony Entertainment Television Asia	India	Hindi	General	OSN
STAR Gold	India	Hindi	Movies	OSN
STAR Jalsha	India	Bengali	General	OSN
STAR Plus	India	Hindi	General	OSN
Sun TV	India	Tamil	General	OSN
Surya	India	Malayalam	General	OSN
TEN Cricket	India	English	Cricket	OSN
Udaya	India	Kannada	General	OSN
Vijay	India	Tamil	General	OSN
Times Now	India	English	News	OSN
UTV Bindass	India	Hindi	General	OSN
UTV Movies	India	Hindi	Movies	OSN
UTV Stars	India	Hindi	Movies	OSN
Zee Cinema	India	Hindi	Movies	OSN
Zee News	India	Hindi	News	OSN
Zee Telugu	India	Telugu	General	OSN
Zee TV	India	Hindi	General	OSN

=== Singapore ===
Network	Origin of programming	Language	Genre	Service
Asianet	India	Malayalam	General	StarHub
Asianet Movies	India	Malayalam	Movies	StarHub
MTV India	India	Hindi	Music	Singtel
STAR Bharat	India	Hindi	General	StarHub
STAR Bharat	India	Hindi	General	Singtel
Colors	India	Hindi	General	StarHub
Colors	India	Hindi	General	Singtel
SET Max	India	Hindi	Movies	StarHub
SET Max	India	Hindi	Movies	Singtel
Sony Entertainment Television Asia	India	Hindi	General	StarHub
Sony Entertainment Television Asia	India	Hindi	General	Singtel
STAR Cricket	India	English	Cricket	StarHub
STAR Cricket	India	English	Cricket	Singtel
STAR Cricket HD	India	English	Cricket	StarHub
STAR Cricket HD	India	English	Cricket	Singtel
STAR Gold	India	Hindi	Movies	StarHub
STAR Gold	India	Hindi	Movies	Singtel
STAR Plus	India	Hindi	General	StarHub
STAR Plus	India	Hindi	General	Singtel
STAR Maa	India	Telugu	General	StarHub
STAR Maa	India	Telugu	General	Singtel
Sun Music	India	Tamil	Music	StarHub
Sun TV	India	Tamil	General	StarHub
Sun TV	India	Tamil	General	Singtel
SAB TV	India	Hindi	General	StarHub
SAB TV	India	Hindi	General	Singtel
TEN Cricket	India	English	Cricket	StarHub
Vannathirai	Singapore	Tamil	Movies	StarHub
V Thamizh HD	Singapore	Tamil	General	StarHub
Verna	Singapore	Telugu/Kannada	General	StarHub
Vasantham	Singapore	Tamil	General	StarHub
Vijay	India	Tamil	General	StarHub
Vijay	India	Tamil	General	Singtel
Zee Cinema	India	Hindi	Movies	StarHub
Zee News	India	Hindi	News	StarHub
Zee TV	India	Hindi	General	StarHub
Zee TV	India	Hindi	General	Singtel
Zee Telugu	India	Telugu	General	StarHub
Zee Telugu	India	Telugu	General	Singtel
Zee Tamil	India	Tamil	General	StarHub
Zee Tamil	India	Tamil	General	Singtel
&TV	India	Hindi	General	StarHub

=== Trinidad and Tobago ===
Network	Origin of programming	Language	Genre
&TV	India	Hindi	General
B4U Movies	India	Hindi	Movies
B4U Music	India	Hindi	Music
Bhakti TV	Trinidad and Tobago	Trinidadian and Tobagonian English, Trinidadian Hindustani, Modern Standard Hindi, Sanskrit	Religious
Colors Rishtey	India	Hindi	General
Colors TV	India	Hindi	General
The Islamic Network (T.I.N.)	Trinidad and Tobago	Trinidadian and Tobagonian English, Urdu, Arabic	Religious
ieTV	Trinidad and Tobago	Trinidadian and Tobagonian English, Trinidadian Hindustani, Modern Standard Hindi, Sanskrit	General and Religious
Islamic Broadcast Network	Trinidad and Tobago	Trinidadian and Tobagonian English, Urdu, Arabic	Religious
Sankhya TV	Trinidad and Tobago	Trinidadian and Tobagonian English, Trinidadian Hindustani, Modern Standard Hindi, Sanskrit	Religious
Sony Entertainment Television Asia	India	Hindi	General
Sony MAX	India	Hindi	Movies
Star Bharat	India	Hindi	General
Star Gold	India	Hindi	General
Star Plus	India	Hindi	General
TV Jaagriti	Trinidad and Tobago	Trinidadian and Tobagonian English, Trinidadian Hindustani, Modern Standard Hindi, Sanskrit	Religious
Z Living	United States	English	Entertainment and Lifestyle
Zee Cinema	India	Hindi	Movies
Zee TV	India	Hindi	General
Zee World	South Africa	English	General

=== United States ===
Network	Origin of programming	Language	Genre	Service
9X Tashan	India	Punjabi	Music	Dish
9X Tashan	India	Punjabi	Music	Sling TV
AAG	Pakistan	Urdu	Music	Dish
Aaj Tak	India	Hindi	News	Dish
Aaj Tak	India	Hindi	News	Sling TV
Aapka Colors	India	Hindi	General	AT&T U-verse
Aapka Colors	India	Hindi	General	Dish
Aapka Colors	India	Hindi	General	RCN
Aapka Colors	India	Hindi	General	Verizon Fios
Aapka Colors	India	Hindi	General	Sling TV
Aastha	India	Hindi	Religious	Dish
Aastha	India	Hindi	Religious	Sling TV
Aastha Bhajan	India	Hindi	Religious	Dish
ABP News	India	Hindi	News	Xfinity
Adithya	India	Tamil	General	Dish
Adithya	India	Tamil	General	Sling TV
Alpha ETC Punjabi	India	Punjabi	General	Dish
Alpha ETC Punjabi	India	Punjabi	General	Sling TV
ARY Digital	Pakistan	Urdu	General	Dish
ARY Digital	Pakistan	Urdu	General	Sling TV
ARY Musik	Pakistan	Urdu	Music	Dish
ARY News	Pakistan	Urdu	News	Dish
ARY News	Pakistan	Urdu	News	Sling TV
ARY QTV	Pakistan	Urdu	Religious	Dish
ARY QTV	Pakistan	Urdu	Religious	Sling TV
ARY Zauq	Pakistan	Urdu	Food	Dish
ARY Zauq	Pakistan	Urdu	Food	Sling TV
Asianet	India	Malayalam	General	Dish
Asianet	India	Malayalam	General	Sling TV
Asianet Movies	India	Malayalam	Movies	Dish
Asianet Movies	India	Malayalam	Movies	Sling TV
Asianet News	India	Malayalam	News	Dish
Asianet News	India	Malayalam	News	Sling TV
Asianet Plus	India	Malayalam	General	Dish
Asianet Plus	India	Malayalam	General	Sling TV
ATN Bangla	Bangladesh	Bengali	General	Sling TV
B4U Movies	India	Hindi	Movies	Dish
B4U Movies	India	Hindi	Movies	Sling TV
B4U Music	India	Hindi	Music	Dish
B4U Music	India	Hindi	Music	Sling TV
Banglavision	Bangladesh	Bengali	General	Dish
Bhakti TV	India	Telugu	Religious	Sling TV
Bhakti TV	Trinidad and Tobago	Trinidadian and Tobagonian English, Trinidadian Hindustani, Modern Standard Hindi, Sanskrit	Religious	Tego TV
Big Magic International	India	Hindi	General	Dish
Big Magic International	India	Hindi	General	Sling TV
Channel i	Bangladesh	Bengali	General	Dish
Channel i	Bangladesh	Bengali	General	Sling TV
Cine Bangla	Bangladesh	Bengali	Movies	Dish
Colors Bangla	India	Bengali	General	Dish
Colors Bangla	India	Bengali	General	Sling TV
Colors Kannada	India	Kannada	General	Dish
Colors Kannada	India	Kannada	General	Sling TV
Colors Marathi	India	Marathi	General	Dish
Colors Marathi	India	Marathi	General	Sling TV
Diya TV	United States	English, Hindi	General	Over-the-air
Dunya	Pakistan	Urdu	News	Dish
Dunya	Pakistan	Urdu	News	Sling TV
ETV Telugu	India	Telugu	General	Dish
ETV Telugu	India	Telugu	General	Sling TV
Express Entertainment	Pakistan	Urdu	General	Dish
Express Entertainment	Pakistan	Urdu	General	Sling TV
Express News	Pakistan	Urdu	News	Dish
Express News	Pakistan	Urdu	News	Sling TV
Filmy	India	Hindi	Movies	Time Warner Cable
Food Food	India	Hindi	Food	Dish
Food Food	India	Hindi	Food	Sling TV
Gemini	India	Telugu	General	Dish
Gemini	India	Telugu	General	Sling TV
Gemini Comedy	India	Telugu	General	Dish
Gemini Comedy	India	Telugu	General	Sling TV
Gemini Movies	India	Telugu	Movies	Dish
Gemini Movies	India	Telugu	Movies	Sling TV
Geo	Pakistan	Urdu	General	Dish
Geo	Pakistan	Urdu	General	Sling TV
Geo News	Pakistan	Urdu	News	Dish
Geo News	Pakistan	Urdu	News	Sling TV
Global Punjab	United States	Punjabi	News	Dish
Global Punjab	United States	Punjabi	News	Sling TV
Halla Bol	India	Hindi	Children's	Dish
Halla Bol	India	Hindi	Children's	Sling TV
Ikk Onkar	United States	Punjabi	Religious	Sling TV
India Today	India	English	News	Dish
ieTVTT	Trinidad and Tobago	Trinidadian and Tobagonian English, Trinidadian Hindustani, Modern Standard Hindi, Sanskrit	General and Religious	Tego TV
Islamic Broadcast Network	Trinidad and Tobago	Trinidadian and Tobagonian English, Urdu, Arabic	Religious	Tego TV
ITV Gold	United States	English, Hindi	General	Optimum
ITV Gold	United States	English, Hindi	General	RCN
ITV Gold	United States	English, Hindi	General	Time Warner Cable
ITV Gold	United States	English, Hindi	General	Sling TV
Jaya Max	India	Tamil	Music	Dish
Jaya Max	India	Tamil	Music	Sling TV
Jaya Movies	India	Tamil	Movies	Dish
Jaya Movies	India	Tamil	Movies	Sling TV
Jaya Plus	India	Tamil	News	Dish
Jaya Plus	India	Tamil	News	Sling TV
Jaya TV	India	Tamil	General	Dish
Jaya TV	India	Tamil	General	Sling TV
Jus 24x7 Comedy	United States	Punjabi	General	Dish
Jus 24x7 Comedy	United States	Punjabi	General	Sling TV
Jus Hindi	United States	Hindi	General, News	Sling TV
Jus Now	United States	Hindi, Punjabi	Music	Sling TV
Jus One	United States	Punjabi	Religious	Dish
Jus Punjabi	United States	Punjabi	General	Dish
Jus Punjabi	United States	Punjabi	General	Optimum
Jus Punjabi	United States	Punjabi	General	Sling TV
Jus Punjabi	United States	Punjabi	General	Time Warner Cable
Jus Punjabi	United States	Punjabi	General	Verizon Fios
Kairali	India	Malayalam	General	Dish
Kairali	India	Malayalam	General	Sling TV
Kairali People	India	Malayalam	News	Sling TV
Kairali We	India	Malayalam	General	Sling TV
Kalaignar	India	Tamil	General	Dish
Kalaignar	India	Tamil	General	Sling TV
Kiran	India	Malayalam	Music	Dish
Kiran	India	Malayalam	Music	Sling TV
KTV	India	Tamil	Movies	Dish
KTV	India	Tamil	Movies	Sling TV
STAR Bharat	India	Hindi	General	Dish
STAR Bharat	India	Hindi	General	Optimum
STAR Bharat	India	Hindi	General	RCN
STAR Bharat	India	Hindi	General	Sling TV
STAR Bharat	India	Hindi	General	Time Warner Cable
STAR Bharat	India	Hindi	General	Xfinity
Star Maa	India	Telugu	General	Dish
Star Maa	India	Telugu	General	Sling TV
Star Maa Gold	India	Telugu	Movies	Dish
Star Maa Gold	India	Telugu	Movies	Sling TV
Star Maa Movies	India	Telugu	Movies	Dish
Star Maa Movies	India	Telugu	Movies	Sling TV
Star Maa Music	India	Telugu	Music	Dish
Star Maa Music	India	Telugu	Music	Sling TV
Maasranga Television	Bangladesh	Bengali	General	Dish
Mazhavil Manorama	India	Malayalam	General	Dish
Mazhavil Manorama	India	Malayalam	General	Sling TV
MH1	India	Punjabi	Music	Dish
MH1	India	Punjabi	Music	Sling TV
Movies OK	India	Hindi	Movies	Dish
Movies OK	India	Hindi	Movies	Sling TV
MTV India	India	Hindi	Music	AT&T U-verse
MTV India	India	Hindi	Music	Dish
MTV India	India	Hindi	Music	Sling TV
NDTV 24x7	India	English	News	Dish
NDTV 24x7	India	English	News	Sling TV
NDTV 24x7	India	English	News	Time Warner Cable
NDTV Good Times	India	English	Lifestyle	Dish
NDTV Good Times	India	English	Lifestyle	Sling TV
News18 India	India	English	News	Dish
News18 India	India	English	News	Sling TV
NTV Telugu	India	Telugu	News	Sling TV
NTV Bangla	Bangladesh	Bengali	General	Dish
NTV Bangla	Bangladesh	Bengali	General	Sling TV
PTC Chak De	India	Punjabi	Music	Dish
PTC News	India	Punjabi	News	Dish
PTC Punjabi	India	Punjabi	General	Dish
PTC Punjabi	India	Punjabi	General	Sling TV
PTV Global	Pakistan	Urdu	General	Dish
PTV Global	Pakistan	Urdu	General	Sling TV
Raj Digital Plus	India	Tamil	Movies	Sling TV
Raj Musix	India	Tamil	Music	Sling TV
Raj News	India	Tamil	News	Sling TV
Raj TV	India	Tamil	General	Sling TV
Rishtey	India	Hindi	General	Dish
Rishtey	India	Hindi	General	Sling TV
SAB	India	Hindi	General	Dish
SAB	India	Hindi	General	Sling TV
Sahara One	India	Hindi	General	Dish
Sahara One	India	Hindi	General	Sling TV
Sahara Samay	India	Hindi	News	Dish
Sahara Samay	India	Hindi	News	Sling TV
Sankhya TV	Trinidad and Tobago	Trinidadian and Tobagonian English, Trinidadian Hindustani, Modern Standard Hindi, Sanskrit	Religious	Tego TV
Sanskar	India	Hindi	Religious	Dish
SET Max	India	Hindi	Movies	Dish
SET Max	India	Hindi	Movies	Sling TV
Sirippoli	India	Tamil	General	Dish
Sirippoli	India	Tamil	General	Sling TV
Sony Aath	India	Bengali	Movies	Dish
Sony Aath	India	Bengali	Movies	Sling TV
Sony Entertainment Television Asia	India	Hindi	General	AT&T U-verse
Sony Entertainment Television Asia	India	Hindi	General	Cox
Sony Entertainment Television Asia	India	Hindi	General	Dish
Sony Entertainment Television Asia	India	Hindi	General	Optimum
Sony Entertainment Television Asia	India	Hindi	General	RCN
Sony Entertainment Television Asia	India	Hindi	General	Time Warner Cable
Sony Entertainment Television Asia	India	Hindi	General	Verizon Fios
Sony Entertainment Television Asia	India	Hindi	General	Xfinity
Sony Entertainment Television Asia HD	India	Hindi	General	Dish
Sony Entertainment Television Asia HD	India	Hindi	General	Sling TV
Sony Mix	India	Hindi	Music	Dish
Sony Mix	India	Hindi	Music	Sling TV
STAR India Gold	India	Hindi	Movies	Cox
STAR India Gold	India	Hindi	Movies	Optimum
STAR India Gold	India	Hindi	Movies	RCN
STAR India Gold	India	Hindi	Movies	Time Warner Cable
STAR India Gold	India	Hindi	Movies	Xfinity
STAR India Plus	India	Hindi	General	AT&T U-verse
STAR India Plus	India	Hindi	General	Cox
STAR India Plus	India	Hindi	General	Dish
STAR India Plus	India	Hindi	General	Optimum
STAR India Plus	India	Hindi	General	RCN
STAR India Plus	India	Hindi	General	Time Warner Cable
STAR India Plus	India	Hindi	General	Verizon Fios
STAR India Plus	India	Hindi	General	Xfinity
STAR India Plus HD	India	Hindi	General	Dish
STAR India Plus HD	India	Hindi	General	Sling TV
Sun Music	India	Tamil	Music	Dish
Sun Music	India	Tamil	Music	Sling TV
Sun TV	India	Tamil	General	Dish
Sun TV	India	Tamil	General	Sling TV
Surya	India	Malayalam	General	Dish
Surya	India	Malayalam	General	Sling TV
SVBC	India	Telugu	Religious	Sling TV
Tara Muzik	India	Bengali	Music	Dish
Tara Muzik	India	Bengali	Music	Sling TV
Times Now	India	English	News	Dish
Times Now	India	English	News	Sling TV
TV Asia Hindi	United States	Hindi, English	General	AT&T U-verse
TV Asia Hindi	United States	Hindi, English	General	Cox
TV Asia Hindi	United States	Hindi, English	General	Dish
TV Asia Hindi	United States	Hindi, English	General	Optimum
TV Asia Hindi	United States	Hindi, English	General	RCN
TV Asia Hindi	United States	Hindi, English	General	Time Warner Cable
TV Asia Hindi	United States	Hindi, English	General	Verizon Fios
TV Asia Hindi	United States	Hindi, English	General	Xfinity
TV Asia Hindi HD	United States	Hindi, English	General	Dish
TV Asia Hindi HD	United States	Hindi, English	General	Sling TV
TV Asia Telugu HD	United States	Telugu	General	Dish
TV Asia Telugu HD	United States	Telugu	General	Sling TV
TV Asia Telugu HD	United States	Telugu	General	Optimum
TV Jaagriti	Trinidad and Tobago	Trinidadian and Tobagonian English, Trinidadian Hindustani, Modern Standard Hindi, Sanskrit	Religious	Tego TV
TV5 News	India	Telugu	News	Dish
TV5 News	India	Telugu	News	Sling TV
TV9 Gujarat	India	Gujarati	News	Dish
TV9 Gujarat	India	Gujarati	News	Sling TV
TV9 Kannada	India	Kannada	News	Dish
TV9 Telugu	India	Telugu	News	Dish
TV9 Telugu	India	Telugu	News	Sling TV
TVOne Global	Pakistan	Urdu	General	Dish
Udaya	India	Kannada	General	Dish
Udaya	India	Kannada	General	Sling TV
UTV Movies	India	Hindi	Movies	Time Warner Cable
Vanitha TV	India	Telugu	General	Sling TV
Vijay	India	Tamil	General	Dish
Vijay	India	Tamil	General	Sling TV
Vijay	India	Tamil	General	Xfinity
Willow Cricket	United States	English	Cricket	Dish
Willow Cricket	United States	English	Cricket	DirecTV
Willow Cricket	United States	English	Cricket	Optimum
Willow Cricket	United States	English	Cricket	Time Warner Cable
Willow Cricket	United States	English	Cricket	Xfinity
Willow Cricket HD	United States	English	Cricket	Dish
Willow Cricket HD	United States	English	Cricket	Sling TV
Willow Cricket HD	United States	English	Cricket	Verizon Fios
Zee Business	India	Hindi	Business	Dish
Zee Cinema	India	Hindi	Movies	Dish
Zee Cinema	India	Hindi	Movies	Sling TV
Zee Kannada	India	Kannada	General	Dish
Zee Kannada	India	Kannada	General	Sling TV
Zee Marathi	India	Marathi	General	Dish
Zee Marathi	India	Marathi	General	Sling TV
Zee Smile	India	Hindi	General	Dish
Zee Telugu	India	Telugu	General	Dish
Zee Telugu	India	Telugu	General	Sling TV
Zee Telugu	India	Telugu	General	Optimum
Zee TV	India	Hindi	General	AT&T U-verse
Zee TV	India	Hindi	General	Cox
Zee TV	India	Hindi	General	Dish
Zee TV	India	Hindi	General	Optimum
Zee TV	India	Hindi	General	RCN
Zee TV	India	Hindi	General	Time Warner Cable
Zee TV	India	Hindi	General	Verizon Fios
Zee TV	India	Hindi	General	Xfinity
Zee TV HD	India	Hindi	General	Dish
Zee TV HD	India	Hindi	General	Sling TV
Zing	India	Hindi	Music	Dish
Zoom	India	Hindi	General	Dish
Zoom	India	Hindi	General	Sling TV
