= List of broadcasting licences held by Asian Television Network International Limited =

The following is a list of television broadcasting licences held by Asian Television Network:

== Launched (On the air) ==
- ATN Aastha TV (Operates as exempt Cat. 2 Ethnic service)
- ATN ARY Digital (Operates as exempt Cat. 2 Ethnic service)
- ATN B4U Movies (ATN Hindi Movie Channel 3)
- ATN B4U Music (ATN- Music Network One (Hindi Music) - AMN1)
- ATN Bangla (Operates as exempt Cat. 2 Ethnic service)
- ATN Brit Asia TV (Operates as exempt Cat. 2 Ethnic service)
- ATN Channel (SATV)
- ATN Colors Bangla (Operates as exempt Cat. 2 Ethnic service)
- ATN Colors Marathi (Operates as exempt Cat. 2 Ethnic service)
- ATN Colors Rishtey (Operates as exempt Cat. 2 Ethnic service)
- ATN Cricket Plus (ATN - Asian Sports Network)
- ATN DD Bharati (Operates as exempt Cat. 2 Ethnic service)
- ATN DD India (Operates as exempt Cat. 2 Ethnic service)
- ATN DD News (Operates as exempt Cat. 2 Ethnic service)
- ATN DD Sports (ATN - Cricket Channel I)
- ATN DD Urdu (Operates as exempt Cat. 2 Ethnic service)
- ATN Food Food (ATN South Asian Cooking Channel 1)
- ATN Gujarati (Operates as exempt Cat. 2 Ethnic service)
- ATN IBC Tamil (Operates as exempt Cat. 2 Ethnic service)
- ATN Jaya TV (Operates as exempt Cat. 2 Ethnic service)
- ATN Life (Operates as exempt Cat. 2 Ethnic service)
- ATN Max 2 (Operates as exempt Cat. 2 Ethnic service)
- ATN Movies (ATN Hindi Movie Channel 4)
- ATN MTV India (Operates as exempt Cat. 2 Ethnic service)
- ATN News (ATN South Asian English News Channel 2)
- ATN News18 India (Operates as exempt Cat. 2 Ethnic service)
- ATN PM One (Operates as exempt Cat. 2 Ethnic service)
- ATN Punjabi (Operates as exempt Cat. 2 Ethnic service)
- ATN Punjabi 5 (Operates as exempt Cat. 2 Ethnic service)
- ATN Punjabi Plus (Operates as exempt Cat. 2 Ethnic service)
- ATN SAB TV (ATN Comedy Channel One)
- ATN Sikh Channel (Operates as exempt Cat. 2 Ethnic service)
- ATN Sony Aath (Operates as exempt Cat. 2 Ethnic service)
- ATN Sony Mix (Operates as exempt Cat. 2 Ethnic service)
- ATN Sony TV (Operates as exempt Cat. 2 Ethnic service)
- ATN SVBC (Operates as exempt Cat. 2 Ethnic service)
- ATN Tamil Plus (Operates as exempt Cat. 2 Ethnic service)
- ATN Times Now (ATN – South Asian News – English)
- ATN Urdu (Operates as exempt Cat. 2 Ethnic service)
- ATN Zoom (ATN – Music Network Two (Hindi Music))
- CBN (ATN Cricket Channel One)

== Yet to launch ==
- ATN Caribbean Channel Two
- ATN Hindi Movie Channel 5
- ATN Urdu News Channel 1

== Did not launch (License has expired) ==
- ATN- Arabic News Channel
- ATN- Bangla Channel Two
- ATN- Cricket Channel I
- ATN- Cricket Channel II
- ATN Cricket Channel Two
- ATN – Hindi Movie Channel Two
- ATN- Malayalam Channel One
- ATN- Malayalam Channel Two
- ATN- Music Network Three (Tamil Music) - AMN3
- ATN- Music Network Two (Hindi Music) - AMN2
- ATN- South Asian News- Hindi (Pay service)
- ATN- South Asian News- Hindi/English (Pay service)
- ATN – South Asian News – Hindi
- ATN – South Asian News – Hindi/English
- ATN- South Asian News - Tamil
- ATN- Urdu Channel Two
- ATN- Urdu Channel Three
- Hindi Movie Channel
- Telugu Channel
