= Stronger Together, Tous Ensemble =

- Country of origin: Canada
- Original languages: English; French

Production
- Running time: 90 minutes

Original release
- Network: Syndication
- Release: April 26, 2020

Stronger Together, Tous Ensemble was a 90-minute Canadian benefit concert which aired on April 26, 2020, during the COVID-19 pandemic and a week after the 2020 Nova Scotia attacks. The program drew an audience of over 11,500,000 viewers and listeners, and was simulcast by every major Canadian television broadcast company, including Bell Media (CTV), Canadian Broadcasting Corporation (CBC Television), Rogers Media (Citytv), Corus Entertainment (Global), V, and numerous other television, radio, and Internet-based broadcast platforms. This made it both the largest multi-platform broadcast and highest viewed non-sporting broadcast in Canadian television history. Numerous singers, actors, athletes, charities, and those impacted by coronavirus were featured including remarks by Prime Minister Justin Trudeau. Over CA$9,000,000 in donations during the event were raised for Food Banks Canada.

== Production ==
Stronger Together, Tous Ensemble is primarily composed of homemade video from various celebrities' households, singing or giving words of encouragement. The program was created in collaboration to unite viewers during the COVID-19 pandemic and after the 2020 Nova Scotia attacks.

=== Broadcasters ===
The benefit concert aired on 120 different radio, television, and online platforms.

On television, the concert was broadcast on English-language stations CTV, CBC Television, Citytv, and Global. It was also broadcast on French-language station V. The special was also simulcast on networks owned by Bell Media (CP24, CTV 2, MTV, Much, TSN, and Vrak), the Canadian Broadcasting Corporation (Ici ARTV and Unis), Rogers Media (FX and Omni Television), Corus Entertainment (ABC Spark, National Geographic, SériesPlus, and Slice), Asian Television Network (ATN HD, ATN Bangla, ATN Cricket Plus, ATN Food Food, ATN Gujarati, ATN Jaya TV, ATN Life, ATN PM One, ATN Punjabi Plus, and CBN), Blue Ant Media (A.Side TV, BBC Earth, Cottage Life, HIFI, Love Nature, Makeful, and Smithsonian Channel), and Stingray Group (Stingray Hits! and Stingray Retro), as well as networks such as APTN, Family Channel, Hollywood Suite, NTV, OutTV, and Super Channel Fuse.

On radio, the concert was simulcast on CBC Music, CBC Radio One, EZ Rock, SiriusXM channel 169, and Virgin Radio, and select stations owned by Arctic Radio, Bell Media Radio, Blackburn Radio, First Peoples Radio, Harvard Broadcasting, Jim Pattison Group, Rawlco Communications, Stingray Radio, and Vista Radio.

The concert was also streamed on numerous websites, streaming services, and on-demand services, including CBC Gem, CBC Listen, Crave, Ici TOU.TV, Stingray Qello, Super Channel On Demand, and the websites and apps of the CBC, CTV, Citytv, Entertainment Tonight Canada, Global, Global News, and iHeartRadio Canada.

== Featuring ==
Stronger Together, Tous Ensemble began with Sam Roberts cover of "We're All In This Together" with his family and subsequently featured numerous singers, actors, athletes, charities, victims of the COVID-19 pandemic, politicians, and Canadian personalities. It concluded with a twenty-seven artist collaboration of "Lean on Me", and closing remarks by Justin Trudeau and Drake.

=== Musical performances ===
Artist	Song	Language
Sam Roberts	"We're All in This Together"	English
Michael Bublé	"Gotta Be Patient"	English; Spanish
Barenaked Ladies	"Gotta Be Patient"	English; Spanish
Sofia Reyes	"Gotta Be Patient"	English; Spanish
Bryan Adams	"Shine a Light"	English
Tom Cochrane	"Life Is a Highway"	English
Sarah McLachlan	"Blackbird" (The Beatles)	English
Voices Rock Medicine (A choir consisting of Canadian women physicians)	"Rise Again" (The Rankin Family)	English
Shania Twain	"Up!"	English
City and Colour	"We Found Each Other in the Dark"	English
Charlotte Cardin	"Faufile"	French
Randy Bachman	"Takin' Care of Business"	English
William Prince	"The Spark"	English
Jann Arden	"Sleepless"	English
Alessia Cara	"You've Got a Friend in Me" (Randy Newman)	English
Measha Brueggergosman	"You'll Never Walk Alone" (Rodgers and Hammerstein)	English
David Foster and Katharine McPhee	"St. Elmo's Fire"	English
Marie-Mai	"Ton Histoire"	French
Burton Cummings	"Share the Land"	English
Max Kerman and Nick Dika	"Years in the Making"	English

==== Lean on Me ====
Near the end of the broadcast, twenty-seven artists collaborated on a bilingual rendition of "Lean on Me" as a tribute to Bill Withers following his death a month earlier. The rendition is a product of an initiative by Tyler Shaw and Fefe Dobson called ArtistsCAN, and was released separately to raise funds for the Canadian Red Cross.

- Tyler Shaw
- Fefe Dobson
- Johnny Orlando
- Michael Bublé
- Justin Bieber
- Sarah McLachlan
- The Tenors
- Avril Lavigne
- Bryan Adams
- Command Sisters
- Serena Ryder
- Geddy Lee
- Buffy Sainte-Marie
- Jann Arden
- Marie-Mai
- Walk off the Earth
- Dan Kanter
- Desiire
- Donovan Woods
- Josh Ramsay
- Olivia Lunny
- Jules Halpern
- Scott Helman
- Ryland James
- Shawn Hook
- TIKA
- Bad Child

=== Other appearances ===
Person	Occupation
Rick Mercer	Comedian
Hayley Wickenheiser	Retired hockey player, five-time Olympian
Lilly Singh	Comedian
Eugene Levy; Dan Levy; Catherine O'Hara; Annie Murphy; Cast of Schitt's Creek	Actors
Russell Peters	Comedian
Jason Priestley	Actor, film director
Serge Ibaka	Basketball player, member of the Toronto Raptors
Celine Dion	Singer
Kiefer Sutherland	Actor
Eric McCormack	Actor
Perry Bellegarde	National Chief of the Assembly of First Nations
Anne Murray	Singer
Ryan Reynolds	Actor
Penny Oleksiak	Olympic swimmer
Tessa Virtue	Retired Ice dancer and three-time Olympian
Bianca Andreescu	Tennis player
Chris Hadfield	Astronaut
Hamza Haq	Actor
Will Arnett and Amy Poehler	Actors
Mike Myers	Actor
Julie Payette	Governor General of Canada, Former astronaut
Geddy Lee	Singer, member of Rush
Christine Sinclair	Soccer player
Pascal Siakam	Basketball player, member of the Toronto Raptors
Connor McDavid	Hockey player, member of the Edmonton Oilers
The Atherton Family (Cirque du Soleil)	
David Suzuki	Environmentalist
Margaret Atwood	Author
Robbie Robertson	Musician, member of The Band
Rick Hansen	Paralympian
George P. Allen; Margaret Rivers; Jemima Westcott; Burdett Sisler	Centenarians
Howie Mandel	Comedian
Justin Bieber; Hailey Baldwin	Singer; Model
Buffy Sainte-Marie	Singer
Abdulwahab Jalab	Syrian entrepreneur, Food delivery volunteer
Andre de Grasse	Sprinter
Georges St-Pierre	Retired mixed martial artist
Morgan Rielly	Hockey player, member of the Toronto Maple Leafs
Scott McGillivray	Host of Income Property
Drew Scott and Linda Phan	Co-host of the Property Brothers
Bubbles and Ricky (Trailer Park Boys)	Fictional characters
Justin Trudeau	Prime Minister of Canada
Drake	Rapper

== Impacts ==
Justin Trudeau
(@JustinTrudeau)
tweeted:

Our front line workers are going above and beyond to keep us safe, our shelves stocked, and our country moving. And tonight's #StrongerTogether event is all about saluting them and supporting @FoodBanksCanada. Click here to get all the details: http://StrongerTogetherCanada.ca

April 26, 2020

Stronger Together, Tous Ensemble drew in over 11,500,000 viewers and raised over CA$9,000,000 for Food Banks Canada. The program became the most watched non-sporting event in Canadian television history.

The special won the Canadian Screen Award for Best Entertainment News Program or Series at the 9th Canadian Screen Awards in 2021.

== See also ==
- 2020 in Canadian television § April
- Together at Home
