= Satkirin Kaur Khalsa =

American sikh preacher

- Punjabi: ਸਤਕਿਰਨ ਕੌਰ ਖਾਲਸਾ
- Born: Los Angeles, United States
- Occupations: Sikh preacher, Devotional singer, T.V. presenter
- Spouse: Siri Vishnu Singh
- Website: satkirin.com

Satkirin Kaur Khalsa (Punjabi: ਸਤਕਿਰਨ ਕੌਰ ਖਾਲਸਾ, Hindi: सत्किरन कौर) is a Sikh preacher and prolific Sikh Kirtan singer. She hosts a Kundalini Yoga show on the JUS Punjabi television channel.

== Life ==
She was married to Govinda Singh, after she converted to Sikhism. She was nominated as the Granthi in the Los Angeles Gurudwara in 1974 and currently serves at the Manhattan Gurudwara. She has had the opportunity of singing the opening prayer for the Opening Ceremony of the 2009 United Nations General Assembly on Climate Change. She has performed in Colombia, Ecuador, Peru, Paraguay, Bolivia, Argentina, Chile, India, Malaysia, and United States of America. She hosts a show named JUS Yoga every Saturday & Sunday morning (10am-10:15 am EST) on JUS Punjabi TV.

== Discography ==
She is well known for her expertise in Sikh devotional music. She got the knowledge of Ragas from many leading music scholars like Bibi Amarjit Kaur, Bhai Jaspal Singh, Bhai Pargat Singh, and Ustaad Narinder Singh and Bhai Hari Singh of Patiala Gharana. Her recorded works include:

- Ignite Your Light: Musical Meditation for Beginners
- Ajai Alai
- Jaap Sahib – Gobinday Mukunday & Ajai Alai
- Mangala Charan of Jaap Sahib
- Guru Guru Wahe Guru
- Chatara Chakara Vartee
- Lightness of Being
- Universal Prayer
- Ra Ma Da Sa Sa Se So Hung
- Melody and Majesty
- Shabd I
- Shabd II

== See also ==
- Sikhism
- Guru Granth Sahib
- Sikh Gurus
