= SSTV =

SSTV may refer to:

- SS-TV (SS-Totenkopfverbände), the SS department responsible for administering the death camps
- Sistema Sandinista de Televisión, Nicaragua
- South Sudan Television
- Sur Sagar TV, Canada
- Slow-scan television, a picture transmission method
