= UTV Movies (Canadian TV channel) =

- Country: Canada
- Broadcast area: National
- Headquarters: Mississauga, Ontario

Programming
- Picture format: 480i (SDTV)

Ownership
- Owner: Asian Television Network; SoundView Entertainment
- Sister channels: Filmy

History
- Launched: December 2, 2011
- Closed: December 2012

UTV Movies was a short-lived Canadian Hindi language specialty television channel that was owned by Asian Television Network and SoundView Entertainment. It broadcast Hindi-language programming from UTV Movies and Canadian content.

UTV Movies broadcast Bollywood films from various genres from the UTV library and other studios. It also aired other film related content such as interviews with actors and documentaries.

== History ==
In February 2010, SoundView Entertainment Inc. was granted approval by the Canadian Radio-television and Telecommunications Commission (CRTC) to launch UTV Movies, described at the time as "a national niche third-language ethnic Category 2 specialty programming service devoted to feature films, made-for-TV movies, actor interviews, documentaries and similar movie-related programming."

The channel launched on December 2, 2011, initially on Rogers Cable. The channel abruptly ceased broadcasting in December 2012.
