= Real Estate Channel =

- Real Estate Channel logo
- Country: Canada
- Broadcast area: National
- Headquarters: Vancouver, British Columbia

Ownership
- Owner: Pacific Real Estate Media Ltd.

History
- Launched: 2006

Links
- Website: Real Estate Channel

Real Estate Channel is a Canadian English language cable television channel. It is owned by Pacific Real Estate Media Ltd.

== Programming ==
Real Estate Channel broadcasts residential and commercial real estate listings in various markets across the country where it is available via a television provider. The listings feature pictures of the properties along with background music and voice-overs. Each listing range in length, although, are less than 1 minute. In addition to broadcasting on television, Real Estate Channel broadcasts and syndicates listings on the Internet.

== History ==
Original logo (used from 2006 – 2012)

Real Estate Channel was first launched on Novus Cable Ch 68 on December 1, 2006, to showcase properties for sale in British Columbia to the Downtown television audience.

On May 15, 2008 – Real Estate Channel was launched on MTS TV Ch 31 in Manitoba. On April 30, 2009 – The channel was launched on SaskTel 995 in Saskatchewan.

Real Estate Channel acquired its fourth and largest carrier signing with Rogers Cable Communications Inc. to broadcast its channel to Ontario. Rogers Cable Ch 260. The channel was launched on May 19, 2011.

== Licensing ==
Real Estate Channel is classified as a teleshopping service by the Canadian Radio-television and Telecommunications Commission (CRTC) and, thus, is exempted from requiring a CRTC-issued licence to operate and most other CRTC requirements that pay TV and specialty channels are subject to.
