= Punjabi TV Canada =

- Country: Canada
- Broadcast area: National
- Headquarters: Surrey, British Columbia

Programming
- Picture format: 720p (SDTV)

History
- Launched: April 2017

Links
- Website: Punjabi TV Canada

Punjabi TV is a Canadian Punjabi language specialty channel with select programming in the Punjabi language. It is owned by Studio 7 Production and Navalpreet Rangi. It features a mix of programs, including Punjabi documentaries, news, and music. Punjabi TV is also available on YouTube.
