= TXT-TV =

- TxT-TV
- Country: Canada
- Broadcast area: National
- Headquarters: Montreal, Quebec

Ownership
- Owner: Airborne Technology Ventures

History
- Launched: March 17, 2010 (Channel)
- Closed: December 2011

TXT-TV was a short-lived Canadian English language television programming block turned-specialty television channel owned by Airborne Technology Ventures that broadcast programs based on interactivity with viewers via their mobile phones.

== History ==
=== Programming ===
The channel was based on a concept of viewer-created content. The service provided content directed to all adults aged 18 and older and provided a platform for moderated interactive conversation on various topics and interactive games. All programming focused on user contributions via their mobile phones in the form of text messages and data transmissions (used for such features as polls) and the content focus covered a wide range of topics, games, and subject matter.

=== Lifespan ===
The channel was developed by Airborne's founders, Garner Bornstein and Andy Nulman. The concept for the channel was created when Bornstein and Nulman viewed a British TV program whereby viewers voted on upcoming music videos to be played, when on a business trip in London, England.

Logo used as the TXT-TV programming block

On September 13, 2007, TXT-TV launched as a programming block on Persona Communications system in Sudbury, Ontario for 5 weeks as a test run on Thursday, Friday, and Saturday nights from midnight to 4:00am EST on channel 13.

After a successful run on Persona, the idea was pitched to Rogers Cable as a programming block on an existing channel, however, Rogers' executives preferred the brand be expanded into a 24-hour channel instead. The channel was subsequently launched on March 17, 2010, exclusively on Rogers Cable.

Due to the nature of the channel consisting solely of text, audio, and graphic-based content without the broadcasting of live action video, the channel was exempt from requiring a Canadian Radio-television and Telecommunications Commission (CRTC) issued broadcasting licence to operate. However, with greater plans to expand the channel, adding more interactive features and live video that would require a broadcasting licence, Airborne applied for and was granted approval from the CRTC in February 2011 to launch the service as a category 2 specialty service.

The broadcast licence was never implemented, however, and the channel folded in early December 2011 for unknown reasons.

== Noted programs ==
- Bid4Cash
- Cutie or Beauty
- Cutest Pet
- My Life Sux
- Sxt it Up
- Back in this Day
- Vocab Challenge
- One Star
- Match Maker
- Dumped
- Locker Room
- Shout at the Headlines
- Txtual Therapy
- Confessional
- Stud or Dud
