= TVOne Canada =

- TVOne Canada logo
- Country: Canada
- Broadcast area: National
- Headquarters: Mississauga, Ontario

Programming
- Picture format: 480i (SDTV)

Ownership
- Owner: Tariq Bari Sheikh

History
- Launched: September 14, 2010
- Closed: November 2015
- Former names: TVOne Global Canada

TVOne Canada was a Canadian exempt Category B Urdu language specialty channel that was owned by TVOne Canada Broadcasting Inc. It broadcast programming from TVOne Global, a popular television channel from Pakistan and Canadian content. It featured primarily entertainment programming including comedies, dramas, soap operas but also airs news & lifestyle shows as well.

TVOne Canada officially launched on September 14, 2010 on Rogers Cable. In March 2013, TVOne launched on Bell Fibe TV. In 2014, it was sold to Tariq Bari Sheikh and was subsequently renamed TVOne Canada.

In November 2015, the channel ceased operations. No announcement was made about the pending shut down and as such the official day it ceased operations is currently unknown.

TVOne Global logo
