= HPItv =

Canadian television channel

- HPItv logo
- Country: Canada
- Broadcast area: National
- Headquarters: Toronto, Ontario

Programming
- Picture format: 480i (SDTV)

Ownership
- Owner: Woodbine Entertainment Group

History
- Launched: September 2001
- Former names: The Racing Network Canada (2001-2005)

Links
- Website: HPItv

HPItv (Horseplayer Interactive Television) is a Canadian English language Category B specialty network owned by Woodbine Entertainment Group. HPItv broadcasts thoroughbred, standardbred, and harness racing events and related programming.

== Channels and content ==
HPItv consists of 4 multiplex channels:

- HPItv is the network's flagship feed. It features thoroughbred and harness racing from up to four tracks at a time in a quad-split screen format.
- HPItv Canada provides daily live coverage of primarily Canadian racetracks.
- HPItv International provides daily live coverage from primarily U.S. racetracks. International also features Great Britain & Ireland in the mornings and Australia & Hong Kong in the evening and some overnight.
- HPItv West provides daily live coverage from primarily Western racetracks in Canada and the United States.

== History ==
Only logo as TRN

In November 2000, a joint venture between The Ontario Jockey Club (90%) and BCE Media (10%) called the Ontario Jockey Club (Partnership), was granted approval by the Canadian Radio-television and Telecommunications Commission (CRTC) to launch a television channel called The Racing Network Canada, described as "a national English-language Category 2 specialty television service dedicated to Canadian and international horse racing and horse racing related programming, including live races, related commentary, odds, replays, and results."

Logo used from 2005 to 2008

Prior to the channel's launch, in September 2001, the Ontario Jockey Club changed its name to Woodbine Entertainment Group and purchased BCE Media's shares in the service.

Later that same month, the channel was launched as The Racing Network Canada (TRN) with four multiplex channels— three devoted to live matches (Live Horse Racing Channel, Full Card Favourites - 1, and Full Card Favourites - 2) and one displaying pool odds, probables and results (Live Canadian Odds Channel). In 2004, TRN launched a fifth channel, TRN West.

In March 2005, TRN was rebranded HPItv to align it with Woodbine's online and telephone wagering service, HorsePlayer Interactive (HPI).

Logo from 2008 to 2015

On January 11, 2017, Woodbine Entertainment Group announced that it would shutter the service on April 11, 2017, due to diminishing subscribers and rising production costs. The main channel was to continue to operate with a lighter track load until the scheduled closing date, and on minimal staff. Despite the intended closure of the channel, the HPItv Canada, HPItv International, and HPItv West feeds, which operate under a pay-per-view (PPV) licence agreement, would continue to be offered to television service providers. On February 27, 2017, Woodbine Entertainment Group announced that it was reversing its decision to discontinue the service, citing feedback from horseplayers and racing fans. Despite not shuttering the service entirely, only the HPItv Odds channel would be shuttered on May 1, 2017, while the flagship channel, HPItv, would remain on the air in a revised format which launched on March 1, 2017, whereby the live feed of up to four tracks will be displayed simultaneously on a new quad-split screen format throughout the racing day and evening. This eliminated the need for the staff running the original channel that switched between tracks throughout the day. The 3 remaining PPV channels would remain on air displaying one track at a time, as was always the format.
