= Niagara News TV =

Defunct Canadian television news channel

- Niagara News TV logo
- Country: Canada
- Broadcast area: Niagara Region
- Headquarters: St. Catharines, Ontario

Ownership
- Owner: Peninsula Broadcasting Corporation

History
- Launched: February 7, 2011
- Closed: April 18, 2011

Niagara News TV (NNTV) was a short-lived Canadian English language regional category 2 digital cable specialty channel. Niagara News TV was a news and information television service for the Niagara Region. In addition to operating on cable, the service also planned on streaming on the Internet, although those plans never materialized.

While it was originally set to launch on November 10, 2010 under the name Niagara Now TV, the launch date had been pushed back to sometime in the winter of 2010/2011; later confirmed as February 7, 2011 and a name change to Niagara News TV.

The channel suspended operations on April 18, 2011 due to "technical difficulties" cited by company president Frank Thibault. Although there were plans to bring operations back by fall 2011, the channel did not begin operations as planned. Upon suspending operations, viewers were initially prompted with a screen with weather graphics and a news ticker when they turned to the channel number on Cogeco cable, the only television provider who carried the channel, although this has since ended.
