= Legislative Television =

Canadian television network

Legislative Television (officially The Legislative Television Broadcast and Recording Services) is a cable television network exclusively in the Canadian province of Nova Scotia. Legislative Television was established in 1991 to broadcast the parliamentary proceedings of the Legislative Assembly of Nova Scotia. It is available on EastLink TV digital cable channels 95 and 636, and also Bell Aliant TV channel 230. The channel is also available on analog cable 10 (or 5 in the Annapolis Valley) during portions of the day from Tuesday to Thursday. The channel does not carry advertising during programming.

Legislative Television offers audio transcripts of the sessions of government. Live television webcasts are co-produced with Communications Nova Scotia.
