= The Cult Movie Network =

- Country: Canada
- Broadcast area: National
- Headquarters: Edmonton, Alberta

Programming
- Picture format: 480i (SDTV)

Ownership
- Owner: The Cult Movie Channel Inc. (Dieter Kohler)

History
- Launched: 2008-2009

Links
- Website: The Cult Movie Network

The Cult Movie Network was a Canadian-based English language online video-on-demand service consisting of programming devoted to cult films from a variety of genres, primarily horror, but also including fantasy, comedy, and action, among others. The channel is owned by the Cult Movie Channel Inc., a company owned by Dieter Kohler.

The service previously operated additionally as a linear television service in Canada and international markets until the channel was dropped by the only provider who carried it in Canada in late 2018. It is unknown whether the channel still operates in international markets.

== History ==
In May 2003, Dieter Kohler was granted approval by the Canadian Radio-television and Telecommunications Commission (CRTC) to launch a television channel called The Cult Movie Channel, described as being "an English-language Category 2 specialty television service... devoted to exploring the world of cult film and television."

Original logo (2010-2012)

The service initially launched as an online subscription service in 2008-2009 as The Cult Movie Network focusing on low-budget B movies primarily from the horror film genres.

The service launched its linear television service in December 2010 on MTS TV in Manitoba. Since that time, the channel had reached carriage agreements with other TV providers around the world for carriage on their systems, including Slovakia, the United Kingdom, and Ireland.

According to the service's website in early 2011, the service was scheduled to undergo a rebrand in the summer of 2011 by introducing a new logo, graphics, and programming initiative. The service was expected to focus on higher profile cult films from various genres including comedy, sci-fi, and fantasy. However, the rebrand did not take effect as planned. The rebranding took effect in January 2012; and although the channel began to broadcast programming from a wider variety of films, the majority remained focused on films from the horror genre and are low budget B movies.

On July 21, 2015, the CRTC approved The Cult Movie Channel Inc.'s request to convert The Cult Movie Network from a licensed category B specialty service to an exempted category B service.

On December 1, 2018, the only Canadian television service provider to carry the channel, Bell MTS, dropped the channel from their service.

== See also ==
- TCM Underground
- The Incredibly Strange Film Show
- Mystery Science Theater 3000
