= The Life Channel =

Canadian TV channel (1985–1986)

The Life Channel was a Canadian premium television service featuring programming on lifestyle and health subjects, existing for almost 14 months in the late 1980s. The programming represented some of the earlier efforts of Canada's premium television industry, considering pay-TV movie channels had commenced in 1983. It should not be confused with later Canadian cable channels Life Network (now known as Slice) and CTV Life Channel.

== History ==
The Life Channel was approved for broadcast by the CRTC on 14 March 1985 following licensing hearings on 5 February 1985.

The company was a partnership between Winnipeg, Manitoba doctor John Tyson, who became president of the company, Toronto, Ontario lawyer Michael G. Rinaldo, who became director and secretary, and broadcast company CUC Limited.

On 18 October 1985, The Life Channel began satellite broadcasts to cable companies on a pay-TV basis. The initial broadcasts were available free to cable subscribers as a preview until 1 November 1985. Subscription cost was $5.95 per month, but included free with the other Canadian pay-TV channels at the time, at a cost of $19.95.

Notable programming included Ruth Westheimer's Good Sex! programme which was imported from the American Lifetime network. Domestic programming included a talk show hosted by Shirley Solomon and a medical information show, Doctor On Call, hosted by John Tyson.

As of September 1986, the service attracted relatively small subscriber base of 380,000 compared to 892,000 for TSN, 848,000 for MuchMusic. The Life Channel had increased the wholesale price it charges cable companies from 15 of 55 cents per subscriber, a move which resulted in some cable systems cancelling the service. Faced with financial problems which included a $4 million debt, The Life Channel ceased broadcasts after 30 November 1986. Its licence was revoked by the CRTC on 1 February 1988.
