= Vertical TV =

- Country: Canada
- Broadcast area: National
- Headquarters: Brampton, Ontario

Programming
- Picture format: 480i (SDTV)

Ownership
- Owner: Vertical Entertainment

History
- Launched: July 2015

Links
- Website: https://www.facebook.com/watchverticaltv/

Vertical TV is a Canadian English language exempted Category B specialty channel that broadcasts religious programming dedicated to the Christian faith with a focus on urban communities. It is owned by Vertical Entertainment.

The channel broadcasts both ministry programming and entertainment programming with a focus on Christian values such as music specials, children's series, music videos, and more.

== History ==
The channel launched in July 2015 in Canada.
