= Mehndi TV =

- Mehndi TV logo
- Country: Canada
- Broadcast area: National
- Headquarters: Toronto, Ontario

Programming
- Picture format: 480i (SDTV); 1080i (HDTV)

Ownership
- Owner: Channel Zero

History
- Launched: November 28, 2011
- Closed: January 2018

Mehndi TV was a Canadian Hindi language specialty channel owned by Channel Zero.

Mehndi TV broadcast programming aimed at women, including such programs as cooking shows, health and wellness programs, reality series, exercise shows, and Bollywood films. Programs were primarily sourced from India, in addition to Canadian content.

== History ==
In May 2010, FDR Media Group Inc. was granted approval by the Canadian Radio-television and Telecommunications Commission (CRTC) to launch a television channel called Mehndi HD TV, described as "a national, niche third-language ethnic Category 2 specialty programming service that will feature topics of interest to Canadian women of South Asian heritage."

The channel launched on November 28, 2011 on Bell Fibe TV and Rogers Cable as Mehndi TV in both standard definition and high definition.

At an undisclosed point, FDR's broadcast licenses were acquired by Channel Zero. In January 2018, the channel (along with sister network Bollywood Times) was dropped by all providers who carried it and subsequently shut down.
