= DealsTV =

- DealsTV logo
- Country: Canada
- Broadcast area: National
- Headquarters: Markham, Ontario, Canada

Ownership
- Owner: Capital Networks

History
- Launched: September 2014
- Closed: 2016/2017

DealsTV was a Canadian-English language specialty television channel owned by Capital Networks.

DealsTV was a direct response shopping channel that broadcast infomercials. The channel's programming featured products from a variety of categories including fitness, cooking, clothing, wellness, beauty, electronics, and more.

DealsTV was classified as a teleshopping service by the Canadian Radio-television and Telecommunications Commission (CRTC) and, thus, was exempted from requiring a CRTC-issued licence to operate and most other CRTC requirements to which pay TV and specialty channels are subject to.

== History ==
On September 15, 2014, Capital Networks announced that it had launched DealsTV that month on Rogers Cable in both standard and high definition television in Ontario, New Brunswick, and Newfoundland and Labrador.

Without any announcement or press coverage, the channel was discontinued in either late 2016 or early 2017, and DealsTV website was shuttered along with its social media accounts.
