= Canal de l'Assemblée nationale =

Legislative broadcaster of Quebec

Logo of l'Assemblée Nationale du Quebec / National Assembly of Quebec.

The Canal de l'Assemblée nationale (French pronunciation: [kanal də lasɑ̃ble nɑsjɔnal]) is a Quebec television network, which broadcasts the proceedings of the National Assembly of Quebec on cable television. The channel launched October 3, 1978.
