= Bollywood Times =

- Bollywood Times logo
- Country: Canada
- Broadcast area: Canada
- Headquarters: Toronto, Ontario

Programming
- Picture format: 480i (SDTV); 1080i (HDTV)

Ownership
- Owner: Channel Zero

History
- Launched: November 28, 2011; 14 years ago
- Closed: January 2018; 7 years ago

Links
- Website: https://bollywoodtimes11.com

Bollywood Times was a Canadian Hindi language specialty channel owned by Channel Zero.

Bollywood Times broadcast Bollywood films encompassing a variety of genres including action, comedy, horror, and crime. It also aired television series including comedies, dramas, and thrillers. Programs were primarily sourced from India, in addition to Canadian content.

== History ==
In May 2010, FDR Media Group Inc. was granted approval by the Canadian Radio-television and Telecommunications Commission (CRTC) to launch a television channel called Bollywood Times HD TV, described as "a national, niche third-language ethnic Category 2 specialty programming service devoted to mainstream as well as art films in the Hindi-language not broadcast on other feature film channels."

The channel launched on November 28, 2011, on Bell Fibe TV as Bollywood Times exclusively in high definition (HD). The channel launched on Rogers Cable only days later in December 2011 in both HD and standard definition.

At an undisclosed point, FDR's broadcast licenses were acquired by Channel Zero. In January 2018, the channel was dropped by all providers who carried it (along with sister network Mehndi TV) and subsequently shut down.
