= The Rural Channel =

- Country: Canada
- Broadcast area: National
- Headquarters: Emerald Park, Saskatchewan

Ownership
- Owner: Ag-Com Productions

History
- Launched: May 29, 2013, 11 years ago

Links
- Website: The Rural Channel

The Rural Channel (often abbreviated as TRC) is a Canadian English language specialty television channel and subscription streaming service broadcasting rural lifestyle programming with a particular emphasis on agriculture and equine programming.

The channel is owned by Ag-Com Productions and launched on May 29, 2013.

== History ==
On August 13, 2008, Ag-Com Productions Ltd. was granted approval from the Canadian Radio-television and Telecommunications Commission (CRTC) to launch The Rural Channel, described at the time of license as a "national, English-language Category 2 specialty programming service devoted to serving the interests and needs of individuals and families living outside of major cities in smaller and rural communities across Canada, with a focus on the agriculture industry."

Originally intending to launch the channel in 2011, Ag-Com Productions delayed the launch until 2013 for Shaw Direct to launch its new satellite. The channel officially launched on May 29, 2013 exclusively on Shaw Direct in standard definition. A few weeks later in June, the channel launched a high definition channel simulcasting the standard-definition feed on EastLink. The channel has since launched on several other television service providers, including Telus and Access Communications.

In late 2020, Ag-Com launched TRC Go, an online subscription service streaming The Rural Channel live.

=== Programming ===
Programming on The Rural Channel has remained consistent from its initial launch to current day, focusing on a mix of agriculture news and information, general rural lifestyle, and equine programming. A sample list of programs that aired during its first few months of operation included The Prairie Farm Report, Market Journal, Downunder Horsemanship TV, Monty Roberts Backstage Pass, The Parelli Program, John Lyons, Motorz, James Cluer’s Wine Route, and programming from FEI.

A sample of current day programming on the channel, as of June 2022, includes Sunup TV, World Of Horse Breeds TV, Great Western Guest Ranches, Jonathan Field, Agweek TV, The Jet Set, Mad Dog & Merrill Midwest Grill’n, Cook Like A. Champion, Cris Cox Horsemanship, Today’s Homeowner Television, and programming from Global Champions Tour. The Prairie Farm Report, an Ag-Com Productions' series remains on the air since the channel's launch.
