= Saskatchewan Legislative Network =

Legislative broadcaster of Saskatchewan, Canada

The Saskatchewan Legislative Network is the province-wide cable television network that broadcasts sessions of the Legislative Assembly of Saskatchewan, similar to the Ontario Parliament Network. The network is available on cable television, much like the educational Saskatchewan Communications Network.
