= Persian Vision =

Canadian Persian-language specialty TV channel

- Persian Vision logo
- Country: Canada
- Broadcast area: National
- Headquarters: Toronto, Ontario

Ownership
- Owner: PersianVision Media and Broadcast Corp.

History
- Closed: January 2011

Persian Vision was a Canadian category 2 Persian language digital cable specialty channel. The channel was owned by PersianVision Media and Broadcast Corp. It presented local Canadian content and programs from around the world. Programming on Persian Vision included news, sports, entertainment and more. Foreign programming was primarily derived from Jaam e Jam International as well as other networks from Iran and abroad.

In addition to the television channel, Persian Vision also operated a 24-hour radio channel broadcasting on television and the Internet. However, Internet broadcasting ceased in early 2010 when its website was no longer available. Both the television and radio channels were available exclusively on Rogers Cable until January 2011 when it ceased operations. The television channel had been struggling to maintain its program logs with the Canadian Radio-television and Telecommunications Commission (CRTC) and was hence closed down due to lack of adherence with CRTC regulations. The channel was directed and run almost entirely by Ms Sheena Mojgan Amiri. Ms Amir is a known fraudster and has been written up in the newspapers about how she scams landlords and destroys their property. (http://www.torontosun.com/news/columnists/michele_mandel/2010/08/20/15092061.html)

Persian Vision had been previously dissolved due to non-compliance earlier in 2005 (https://www.ic.gc.ca/app/scr/cc/CorporationsCanada/fdrlCrpDtls.html?corpId=4013344). This issue was regarding a failure to file annual tax return (http://www.ic.gc.ca/eic/site/cd-dgc.nsf/eng/cs02544.html)
