= Nuevo Mundo Television =

Nuevo Mundo Televisión
- Nuevo Mundo Televisión logo
- Country: Canada
- Broadcast area: National
- Headquarters: Montreal, Quebec

Programming
- Picture format: 480i (SDTV)

Ownership
- Owner: NMTV Inc.

History
- Launched: March 13, 2007
- Closed: December 1, 2015

Nuevo Mundo Televisión (NMTV) was a Canadian Category B Spanish language specialty channel owned by NMTV Inc. Nuevo Mundo Televisión broadcast general entertainment and lifestyle programming including news, television dramas, talk shows, and music.

== History ==
In April 2005, Claire Bourgeois, a co-founder of NMTV, was granted approval from the Canadian Radio-television and Telecommunications Commission (CRTC) to launch a television channel called NuevoMundo Television (NMTV), described as being "wholly devoted to reflecting the lifestyles and the needs of the Hispanic community of Canada, including programming dedicated to youth."

Nuevo Mundo logo 2007-2012

The channel launched on March 13, 2007 as Nuevo Mundo Televisión initially on Vidéotron, later expanding to other television service providers. It was billed as Canada's first all-Spanish language television channel. It is available on Bell Fibe TV and was previously available on Rogers Cable.

In October 2012, the channel re-launched with a new look and new programming. In addition, a partnership was announced with US-based Spanish channel SOiTV, the agreement includes the acquisition of programming from SOiTV.

On February 21, 2013, Nuevo Mundo TV re-launched on Bell Fibe TV, available to subscribers in Quebec & Ontario, as part of the 'better' package.

On May 15 a new group of investors came in, and named Peter Jaimes as the President of the company.

It ceased its activities on December 1 of 2015, without any formal announcement.
