= Xite 4K =

XITE 4K
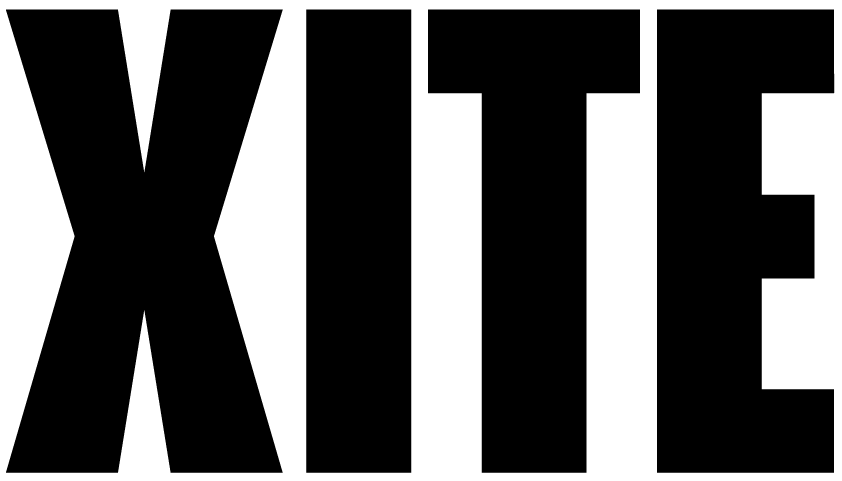
- XITE 4K 4K logo
- Country: Canada
- Broadcast area: National
- Headquarters: Toronto, Ontario

Ownership
- Owner: XCAN Networks Inc.

History
- Launched: June 2017

XITE 4K is a Canadian English language Category B television channel owned by XCAN Networks Inc. The channel broadcasts music videos in 4K resolution (ultra-high-definition television) from current popular music artists from various genres including pop, dance, hip-hop, and more.

== History ==
In June 2017, it was announced that Dutch-based music broadcaster, XITE, was launching a television channel in Canada that month, called XITE 4K, exclusively, initially, on Rogers Cable. Although parties involved in launching the service and media reports did not specifically refer to the channel as a Canadian version of XITE, as opposed to a foreign service, through Canadian Radio-television and Telecommunications Commission documents, it was confirmed to be a Canadian version, launched as an exempt service, not requiring a broadcast licence to launch.
