= Inuit TV =

Canadian television channel

- Inuit TV logo
- Country: Canada
- Broadcast area: National

Ownership
- Owner: Inuit TV Network

History
- Launched: May 2, 2022

Links
- Website: inuit.tv

Inuit TV is a Canadian specialty television channel owned by Inuit TV Network.

The channel broadcasts programming primarily in Inuktitut, with supplementary programming in English and Inuinnaqtun, with the stated purpose to inform, educate, entertain, and promote and preserve the Inuit languages, identity, and culture. The channel is recognized as a regional educational broadcaster by the government of Nunavut.

The channel launched as a licence-exempt service on May 2, 2022, on Shaw Direct.

On October 22, 2024, the Canadian Radio-television and Telecommunications Commission announced it would issue a full licence to Inuit TV, but declined its request to be included on the basic service of all traditional Canadian TV providers under a 9.1 (1)(h) order in favour of Uvagut TV, a similar Inuktitut language service that launched in 2021, citing the latter's existing full broadcast day service. A dissenting opinion by Claire Anderson, the CRTC's only Indigenous commissioner, indicated she would have approved Inuit TV's mandatory carriage instead, and expected the channel to close without further support.
