= HSTN =

Defunct Canadian television channel

- HSTN logo
- Country: Canada
- Broadcast area: National
- Headquarters: Toronto, Ontario

Programming
- Picture format: 480i (SDTV)

Ownership
- Owner: High School Television Network Inc.

History
- Launched: August 2002
- Closed: October 15, 2002

HSTN (an acronym for High School Television Network) was a short-lived Canadian English language category 2 digital cable specialty channel aimed at high school students.

== History ==
On June 4, 2001, Frank Rogers, on behalf of a company to be incorporated, was granted approval from the Canadian Radio-television and Telecommunications Commission (CRTC) to launch a national English-language Category 2 specialty television service called The High School Television Network, described as "devoted to the lifestyles of high school students across Canada. Programming will focus on high school sports (non-professional), drama, music, concerts within the school system, talk and panel shows and news coverage of events pertaining to or affecting the student population. High School Television Network will also provide a medium to broadcast student films or videos completed as a class project or ventures on their own."

The channel launched in August 2002 as HSTN on Rogers Cable.

It planned to show high school sports, concerts, dance programs, plays, high school news and information, among others. During its early existence, however, it showed very little besides endless repeats of Sponsé, an amateur film made by high school students in Toronto. The channel signed off on October 15, 2002.

On February 28, 2003, HSTN Inc. was placed in receivership and was to be temporarily managed by SF Partners Inc. On September 30, 2005, SF Partners purchased the channel and planned to renamed it YES-TV. The channel was intended to relaunch at a later date. However, the service did not launch as intended.

== See also ==
- Varsity TV (similarly-formatted channel in the US, also defunct)
