= ATN Sony TV =

- ATN Sony TV logo
- Country: Canada
- Broadcast area: National
- Headquarters: Markham, Ontario

Programming
- Picture format: 480i (SDTV); 1080i (HDTV)

Ownership
- Owner: Asian Television Network (name licensed by Sony Pictures Networks India)

History
- Launched: January 21, 2013; 13 years ago

Links
- Website: ATN Sony TV

ATN Sony TV is a Canadian exempt Category B Hindi language specialty channel owned by Asian Television Network (ATN). It broadcasts programming from SET Asia as well as Canadian content.

ATN Sony TV is a general interest family entertainment channel. Programming consists of comedies, dramas, reality series, talk shows, lifestyle programs, Bollywood films and more.

== Programming ==
A list of Notable shows airing on ATN Sony TV:

- Beyhadh
- C.I.D.
- Crime Patrol Dial 100
- Crime Patrol Satark
- Kaun Banega Crorepati Season 9
- The Drama Company
- Vighnaharta Ganesha
- Yeh Un Dinon Ki Baat Hai

== History ==
ATN Sony TV was licensed by the CRTC on November 14, 2012 as South Asian Television Canada Channel 2. It officially launched on January 21, 2013 as ATN Sony TV.

On March 18, 2019, the CRTC approved Asian Television Network's request to convert ATN Sony from a licensed Category B specialty service to an exempted Discretionary third language service.
