= Tamil One =

- Country: Canada
- Broadcast area: National
- Headquarters: Toronto, Ontario

Programming
- Picture format: 1080i (HDTV)

Ownership
- Owner: Tamil One Inc.

History
- Launched: September 6, 2001
- Former names: TamilTV

Links
- Website: www.tamilonetv.ca

Tamil One is a Canadian exempt Category B Tamil language specialty channel.

== History ==
Tamil One was originally owned by Network Television International, who were awarded a license by the Canadian Radio-television and Telecommunications Commission (CRTC) to launch a specialty channel called NTI Tamil Service, described as "a national ethnic Category 2 pay television service targeting the Tamil/Tamil-speaking community."

The channel subsequently launched on September 6, 2001, on Rogers Cable as TamilTV.

On February 9, 2001, Peethambaran Koneswaran sold Network Television International to Medianet Canada Ltd. which was operated by Phillip Koneswaran, who subsequently converted NTI into a subsidiary of Medianet Canada. On December 5, 2002, NTI was granted approval for a specialty channel license allowing them to convert TamilTV from a Pay TV service to a regular specialty service.

In September 2006, the channel was re-branded Tamil One.

On February 1, 2008, Medianet Canada sold the channel to Tamil One Inc. (controlled by Subanasiri Vaithilingam).

On August 30, 2013, the CRTC approved Tamil One Inc.'s request to convert Tamil One from a licensed Category B specialty service to an exempted Cat. B third language service.

In June 2016, Tamil One switched to High Definition service on both Rogers and Bell channels respectively.
