= Asian Television Network =

Canadian broadcasting company

- Type: Public (TSX-V: SAT)
- Industry: Media
- Founded: 1971; 55 years ago
- Headquarters: Markham, Ontario, Canada
- Key people: Shan Chandrasekar, Chairman & CEO
- Products: Broadcasting
- Website: asiantelevision.com

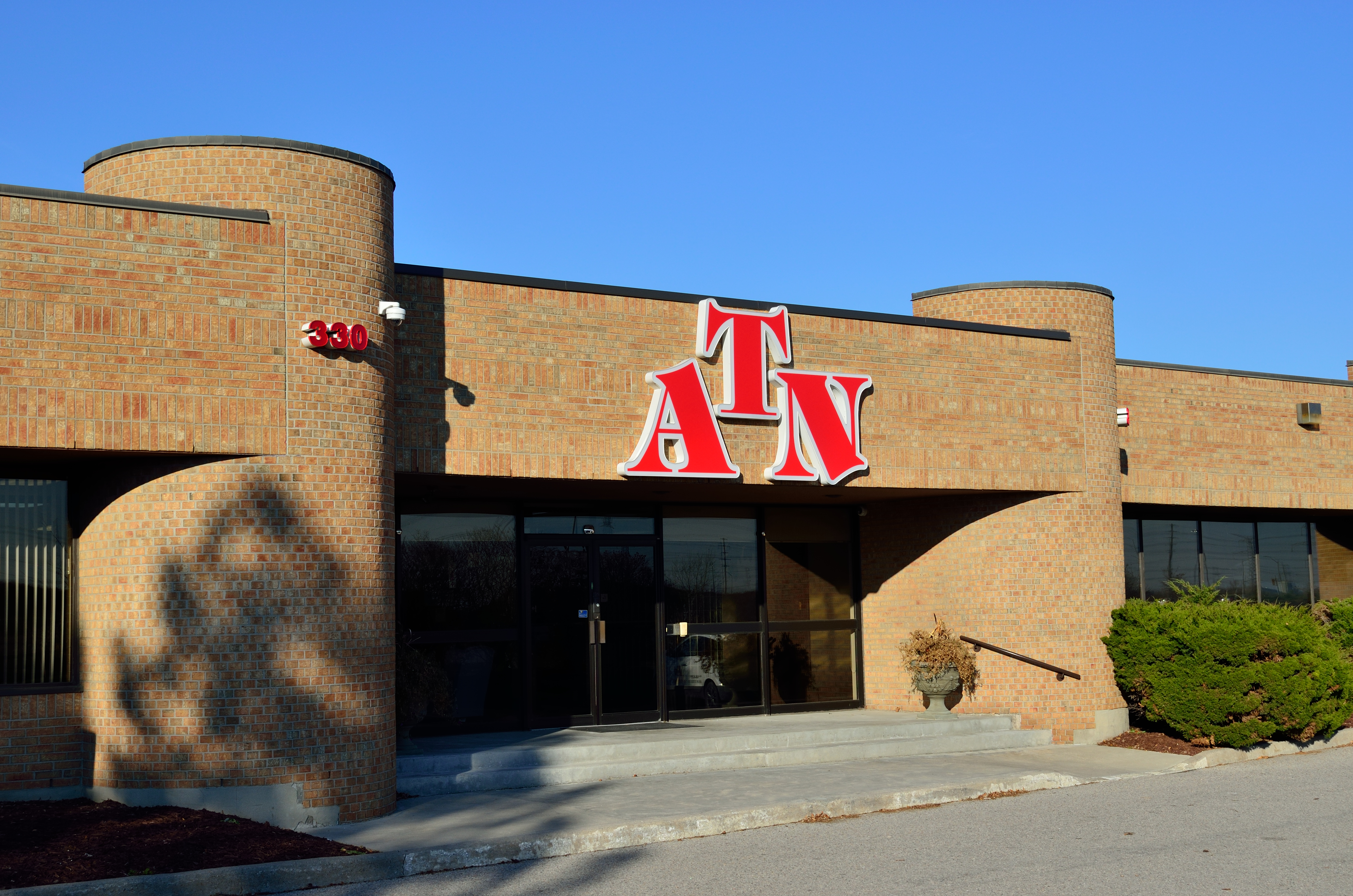
Asian Television Network headquarters in Markham

Asian Television Network (ATN) is a publicly traded Canadian broadcasting company (listed SAT on the TSX Venture Exchange), with 54 television channels in 9 languages, serving the South Asian cultural communities in Canada. ATN operates a South Asian Radio service on XM, available in Canada and the United States. Headquartered in Markham, Ontario, the company has been in operation since 1997, and is headed by Indo-Canadian broadcaster Shan Chandrasekar.

== Awards and recognition ==
- In 2011, ATN was ranked 9th in "Diversified Industries" on the TSX Venture 50.
- In 2008, the executive vice president and vice president of programming, Jaya Chandrasekar was inducted into the Canadian Broadcast Hall of Fame.
- In 2004, Shan Chandrasekar spoke at the CAB Convention.

== Television and Radio ==
ATN currently owns and operates 54 Canadian television channels and has licences for several others.

- ATN &TV (Hindi)
- ATN Aastha TV (Hindi/Gujarati)
- ATN ABP Sanjha (Punjabi)
- ATN Alpha ETC Punjabi (Punjabi)
- ATN ARY Digital (Urdu)
- ATN B4U Movies (Hindi)
- ATN B4U Music (Hindi)
- ATN B4U Plus (Hindi)
- ATN Bangla (Bengali)
- ATN Colors (Hindi)
- ATN Colors Bangla (Bengali)
- ATN Colors Marathi (Marathi)
- ATN Colors Rishtey (Hindi)
- ATN Cricket Plus (English)
- ATN DD Bharati (Hindi)
- ATN DD India (Hindi)
- ATN DD News (Hindi)
- ATN DD Sports (English)
- ATN Food Food (Hindi)
- ATN Gujarati (Gujarati)
- ATN Jaya TV (Tamil)
- ATN Life (Hindi)
- ATN Movies (Hindi)
- ATN MTV India (Hindi)
- ATN News (English)
- ATN News18 India (English)
- ATN PM One (Punjabi)
- ATN Punjabi (Punjabi)
- ATN Punjabi 5 (Punjabi)
- ATN Punjabi News (Punjabi)
- ATN Punjabi Plus (Punjabi)
- ATN Sony Sab (Hindi)
- ATN Sony Aath (Bengali)
- ATN Sony Max (Hindi)
- ATN Sony Max 2 (Hindi)
- ATN Sony Pal (Hindi)
- ATN Sony TV (Hindi)
- ATN Sony Yay! (Hindi)
- ATN Star Plus (Hindi)
- ATN SVBC (Telugu)
- ATN Times Now (English)
- ATN Urdu (Urdu)
- ATN Zoom (Hindi)
- CBN (English)
- ATN Vijay TV (Tamil)
- ATN Vijay Super (Tamil)
- ATN Zee Punjabi (Punjabi)

=== Foreign Services ===
In addition to the 50 O&O channels that it has launched itself, Asian Television Network also distributes a number of foreign services in Canada. ATN is the official Canadian distributor for the following channels:

- ABP News (India)
- ARY Qtv (Pakistan)
- Channel i (Bangladesh)
- NDTV Good Times (India)

=== Radio ===
ATN-Asian Radio
- Canada
- Broadcast area: Canada, United States
- Frequency: Sirius 760
- Branding: ATN Radio

Programming
- Format: South Asian programming

Ownership
- Owner: Asian Television Network

History
- First air date: September 24, 2007

Links
- Website: ATN-Asian Radio

ATN-Asian Radio was a SiriusXM Satellite Radio channel featuring programming dedicated South Asian community in North America. The channel's content was produced by the Asian Television Network. The channel features: talk and phone-in shows, music and poetry, news and current affairs, and live cricket commentary.

The channel was in preview mode from 2007-09-24 until 2007-10-29 at 6 p.m. ET, at which point it was formally launched on XM Canada. The majority of the talk shows were in English with substantial coverage in Punjabi, Hindi, and other South Asian languages. On April 18, 2008, ATN-Asian Radio started broadcasting live Indian Premier League matches on the channel as a part of Asian Television Network International Limited broadcasting rights.

By 2011, it was still on XM only as the Canadian channels were among the last to be consolidated across the two services. In 2012, the Canadian Radio-television and Telecommunications Commission found that the channel failed to play any Canadian musical selections, causing XM to be out of compliance with Canadian content rules. By 2014, ATN-Asian Radio had been moved to SiriusXM channel 165. It aired every evening from 6 p.m. to 3 a.m. Eastern as part of the Multicultural Radio channel.

ATN was removed from the SiriusXM lineup in January 2025. In March 2025, SiriusXM Canada launched Dhamaka, a South Asian music channel produced in-house.

== See also ==
- List of broadcasting licences held by Asian Television Network
