= ATN SVBC =

- ATN SVBC logo
- Country: Canada
- Broadcast area: National
- Headquarters: Markham, Ontario

Programming
- Picture format: 480i (SDTV)

Ownership
- Owner: Asian Television Network

History
- Launched: September 13, 2010
- Former names: ATN Malayalam (2010-2013); ATN Asianet (2013-2017)

Links
- Website: ATN SVBC

ATN SVBC is a Canadian exempt Category B Telugu specialty channel owned by Asian Television Network (ATN). It is the first Telugu channel in Canada and is currently available via Bell Fibe TV and Rogers Cable.

ATN SVBC is a devotional Bhakti channel dedicated to broadcasting Hindu devotional programmes and live telecasts of poojas performed in Tirumala Tirupati Devasthanams from Tirupati in Andhra Pradesh, India.

The channel originally launched as 'ATN Malayalam' on September 13, 2010, on the newly launched Bell Fibe TV platform.

ATN Malayalam logo

In February 2013, ATN Malayalam was renamed 'ATN Asianet'.

In October 2017, ATN Asianet was renamed ATN SVBC due to loss of programming from Asianet.
