= Tamil Vision International =

Canadian Tamil-language specialty TV channel

- TVI logo
- Country: Canada
- Broadcast area: International
- Headquarters: Toronto, Ontario

Programming
- Language: Tamil
- Picture format: 1080p (HDTV)

Ownership
- Owner: Tamil Vision International

Links
- Website: Tamil Vision

Tamil Vision International (officially abbreviated as tvi or simply called Tamil Vision) is a Canadian exempt Category B Tamil language specialty channel, based in Toronto, Ontario. It is the largest Tamil media outlet in North America.

== Description ==
=== History ===
Tamil Vision International (officially abbreviated as tvi or simply called Tamil Vision) is a Canadian exempt Category B Tamil language specialty channel, based in Toronto, Ontario. It is the largest Tamil media outlet in North America. tvi is the first 24 hours Tamil tv channel in North America. It is owned and operated by CMR Diversity FM 101.3. tvi started to broadcast the program in HD format from January 2017 and now it is tvi HD.

On September 17, 2012, the CRTC approved Tamil Vision's request to convert from a licensed Category B specialty service to an exempted Cat. B third language service.

tvi HD shows include a mix of family dramas, comedies, reality shows, shows on politics, health and movies, interviewing celebrities, news updates.

tvi HD was available in Canada via major television providers such as Rogers under Channel No 867 and Bell under Channel Nos 707 / 845. tvi HD was available throughout the world by online streaming using their website www.tamilvision.tv, tvi HD have developed their applications both in Android and ios, where streaming of their Channel is available at free of cost.

== Programming ==
tvi HD has programming which appeals to all audiences irrespective of their age groups or demography. The channel is well accepted as the complete family entertainer with game shows, reality show, comedy, spiritual shows, talk shows, musical shows, drama, films and events. Its shows like Neengalum Nanagalum, Veechu-The Reach, Thirumana Bandham, Nalanthaana, Ivayyal Ippadithaan, Mathavadi Mannargal are seen as trend setters in North American Tamil television industry.

== Availability ==
The channel available across North America through cable providers such as Rogers(Channel #867) and Bell (channel #s 707/845 ) . It also available through web entertainment platform (tamilvision.tv), internet protocol television service, applications both in Android and ios.

== Starfest ==
tvi HD & CMR host the Starfest (formerly known as Kondattam in Tamil), which is an annual event show. Star Fest, an exciting all-day musical extravaganza jam-packed with entertainment for every community, was held every year. The event was a huge success as it brought in tens of thousands of visitors! Guests gave rave reviews about the experience of attending this festival, and the remarkable musical performances by local and international talent!

Canadian Multicultural Radio and tvi HD set out with the plan of hosting an event to provide multicultural communities with the ability to experience diverse music. Programming commenced at noon and carried on until 11pm. Various established international artists graced the stage with their presence and the finest local talent had the opportunity of sharing the same stage.

Furthermore, CMR & tvi HD proudly championed the cause of Autism in support of the South Asian Autism Awareness Centre (SAAAC) at this event. CMR & tvi HD is glad to have a difference in the growth of SAAAC through this event.

== Shows ==
TVi offers a variety of programming from in-house Canadian productions to Tamil programming from around the world. Programming consists of news, films, reality shows, game shows, local community events, kid shows, comedy, political talks and much more.

Programme Name	Broadcast Schedule	Timings(EST)
Kalaikann	Monday	8:30 PM
Nalanthaana	Tuesday	8:30PM
Veechu(Live)	Wednesday	9:00PM
Starfest	Thursday	8:30Pm
Natchathira Saaral	Friday	8:30PM
Thirumana Bandham	Saturday	12:00PM
Athisiya Uzhagam	Saturday	12:30PM
Ivayyal Ippadithaan	Saturday	1:00PM
Endrum Inniyavai	Sunday	10:30AM
Thirai Neram	Sunday	12:00PM
Ithu Eppadi	Sunday	12:30PM
Mathavadi Mannargal	Sunday	1:00PM
Devotional Songs	Daily	6:00AM
Aalayam	Daily	6:30AM
Bhakthi Maalai	Daily	7:00AM
Neengalum Naangalum(Live)	Mon-Fri	7:00PM
Neengalum Naangalum(Live)	Sat-Sun	11:00AM
tvi News	Daily	8:00PM

=== Reality / non-scripted ===
- Kalaikann
- Nalanthaana
- Natchathira Saaral
- Thirumana Bandham

=== Reality / scripted ===
- Athisiya Uzhagam
- Endrum Inniyavai
- Ivayyal Ippadithaan
- Ithu Eppadi
- Mathavadi Mannargal
- Thirai Neram

=== Live shows ===
- Neengalum Naangalum( Entertainment Game Show)
- Veechu(Political Show)

== See also ==
- CMR Diversity FM 101.3
