= ATN Star Plus =

Canadian Asian television network

- Country: Canada
- Broadcast area: National
- Headquarters: Markham, Ontario

Programming
- Picture format: 1080i (HDTV) (2013-present); 480i (SDTV) (1998-present)

Ownership
- Owner: Asian Television Network

History
- Launched: May 1998; 26 years ago
- Former names: SATV (South Asian Television) (1998-2001); ATN Zee TV (2001-2013); ATN Star Plus (2013-2017); ATN Channel (2017-2023)

Links
- Website: ATN Star Plus

ATN Star Plus is a Canadian Category A specialty channel, owned by Asian Television Network (ATN). It is the flagship channel of the Asian Television Network and features programming from StarPlus as well as Canadian content in several South Asian languages.

== History ==
On September 4, 1996, South Asian Television Canada Limited was granted approval from the CRTC to launch an ethnic specialty television channel called SATV, a regional service catering to the South Asian community in Ontario.

On August 7, 1997, South Asian Television Canada Limited received approval to convert SATV into a national service, available across Canada.

The channel officially launched in May 1998 as ATN via cable and satellite.

ATN signed an agreement with Zee Network, securing the exclusive rights to programming from Zee TV, India's top rated channel at the time. This milestone agreement marked the first major content acquisition for ATN and resulted in Zee TV becoming the main source of programming for ATN channel which was subsequently renamed ATN Zee TV.

On September 7, 2006, ATN signed an agreement with STAR Plus, India's top rated entertainment channel. Programming from STAR Plus was subsequently added to the lineup of ATN Zee TV in October 2006 and resulted in the channel being renamed ATN channel.

On January 23, 2013, it was announced that ATN would no longer be airing any programming from Zee TV as of February 1, 2013, due to the expiration of its licensing agreement with Zee. It was also announced that ATN plans on launching an HD feed of ATN channel in March 2013. Zee subsequently reached a licensing agreement with Ethnic Channels Group that resulted in the launch of Zee TV Canada.

On October 6, 2017, ATN Star Plus lost the rights to programming from Star Plus. It subsequently began airing foreign programming from &TV.

In September 2023, ATN signed a new content agreement with Disney Star which included the re-launch of their flagship ATN Channel as ATN Star Plus.

== ATN HD ==
On June 1, 2013, ATN launched ATN HD, a high definition simulcast of the standard definition feed. It is currently available on Bell Fibe TV, Optik TV and Rogers Cable.

== See also ==
- List of South Asian television channels in Canada
