= ATN Urdu =

- Country: Canada
- Broadcast area: National
- Headquarters: Markham, Ontario

Programming
- Picture format: 480i (SDTV)

Ownership
- Owner: Asian Television Network

History
- Launched: May 8, 2004
- Former names: ATN ARY Digital (2004-2012)

Links
- Website: ATN Urdu

ATN Urdu is a Canadian pay television channel owned by Asian Television Network (ATN). It is an Urdu-language general entertainment network, airing programming that appeals to the entire family including comedies, serials, talk shows, music, religious programs, and more.

== History ==
In November 2000, ATN was approved by the Canadian Radio-television and Telecommunications Commission (CRTC) to launch a television channel called Urdu Channel, described as "a national ethnic Category 2 specialty television service targeting the Urdu-speaking community."

The channel launched on May 8, 2004 as ATN ARY Digital under a licensing agreement with ARY Digital, a television network from Pakistan.

ARY Digital logo

In December 2012, the channel was re-branded ATN Urdu due to the expiration of the programming agreement with ARY. As of January 3, 2013, ATN Urdu no longer airs any programming from ARY Digital as the rights are now held by a different broadcaster.

On August 30, 2013, the CRTC approved Asian Television Network's request to convert ATN Urdu from a licensed Category B specialty service to an exempted Cat. B third language service.
