= Sur Sagar TV =

- Sur Sagar TV logo
- Country: Canada
- Broadcast area: National
- Headquarters: Toronto, Ontario

Programming
- Picture format: 480i (SDTV)

Ownership
- Owner: Ravinder Singh Pannu

History
- Launched

Links
- Website: SSTV

Sur Sagar TV, also known as SSTV, is a Canadian Category B Punjabi language specialty channel with select programming in English. It is owned by Ravinder Singh Pannu and features a mix of programming, including movies, news, dramas and music.

The channel was authorized by the Canadian Radio-television and Telecommunications Commission in 2000.

Pannu also operates Sur Saagar Radio, a radio station available on cable and SCMO. It is currently available through Shaw Direct and EastLink Cable.

From September 2013 to mid-2015, Sur Sagar TV had been available over the air via KVOS-TV's digital subchannel 12.3.
