= ATN Sony Aath =

Canadian television channel

- ATN Sony Aath logo
- Country: Canada
- Broadcast area: Nationwide
- Headquarters: Markham, Ontario

Programming
- Picture format: 480i (SDTV)

Ownership
- Owner: Asian Television Network (name licensed by Sony Pictures Networks India)

History
- Launched: September 15, 2010

Links
- Website: ATN Sony Aath

ATN Sony Aath is a Canadian exempt Category B Bengali language specialty channel owned by Asian Television Network (ATN). It broadcasts programming from Sony Aath and Canadian content.

Sony Aath is a premium Bengali language movie channel from India. It has the largest Bengali film library in India, with over 1000 titles in its lineup. It airs both contemporary films as well as beloved classics and features a new movie premiere every week.
