= ATN B4U Music =

- ATN B4U Music logo
- Country: Canada
- Broadcast area: National
- Headquarters: Markham, Ontario

Programming
- Picture format: 480i (SDTV)

Ownership
- Owner: Asian Television Network (name licensed by B4U)
- Sister channels: ATN B4U Movies

History
- Launched: April 6, 2006; 18 years ago

Links
- Website: ATN B4U Music

ATN B4U Music is a Canadian Category B Hindi language specialty channel owned by Asian Television Network (ATN). ATN B4U Music broadcasts music-related programming primarily in the form of a variety of music video-based programs and interview series. Programs are primarily sourced from B4U Music, an Indian-based television channel, in addition to locally produced Canadian content.

== History ==
In April 2005, ATN was granted approval from the Canadian Radio-television and Telecommunications Commission (CRTC) to launch a television channel called ATN - Music Network One (Hindi Music) - AMN1, described as "a national ethnic Category 2 pay television programming undertaking devoted to music programming, interviews with the artists, scenes from the production of their music videos and songs, all in the Hindi language."

Original B4U Music logo

The channel launched on April 4, 2006 as ATN B4U Music initially on Rogers Cable.

On September 25, 2012, B4U Music's broadcasting license to operate as a pay service was revoked at ATN's request. The channel subsequently re-launched as a regular specialty service on June 17, 2012, under the following license: ATN- Music Network One (Hindi Music) - AMN1.
