= ATN Times Now =

Canadian television channel

- ATN Times Now logo
- Country: Canada
- Broadcast area: National
- Headquarters: Markham, Ontario

Programming
- Picture format: 480i (SDTV)

Ownership
- Owner: Asian Television Network (name licensed by The Times Group)

History
- Launched: February 17, 2011

Links
- Website: ATN Times Now

ATN Times Now is a Canadian Category B English language specialty channel owned by Asian Television Network (ATN). It broadcasts programming from Times Now and Canadian content. It features live coverage of news stories with a focus on international news and breaking news.

== See also ==
- ATN NDTV 24x7
