= ATN Movies =

- ATN Movies logo
- Country: Canada
- Broadcast area: National
- Headquarters: Markham, Ontario

Programming
- Picture format: 480i (SDTV)

Ownership
- Owner: Asian Television Network

History
- Launched: October 19, 2005; 19 years ago
- Former names: ATN Zee Cinema (2005–2012); ATN Movies OK (2012–2017)

Links
- Website: ATN Movies

ATN Movies is a Canadian Category B Hindi language specialty channel owned by Asian Television Network (ATN).

ATN Movies is a Bollywood film channel with a focus on family-oriented films. It airs blockbusters, modern classics and contemporary cinema all sourced from various movie studios as well as locally produced Canadian content. As of April 2024, it airs programming from popular Hindi film channel Star Gold.

== History ==
In April 2005, ATN was granted approval from the Canadian Radio-television and Telecommunications Commission (CRTC) to launch a television channel called ATN – Hindi Movie Channel Two, described as "a national ethnic Category 2 pay television programming undertaking devoted entirely to movies presented in the Hindi language."

The channel launched on October 19, 2005 as ATN Zee Cinema.

In 2011, ATN Zee Cinema unveiled a new logo and on-screen graphics to fall in line with its counterpart in India.

On July 25, 2012, ATN Zee Cinema was re-branded ATN Movies OK due to the loss of programming rights for Zee Cinema.

On September 25, 2012, ATN Movies OK's broadcasting license to operate as a pay service was revoked at ATN's request.

In October 2017, ATN Movies OK was renamed ATN Movies due to the loss of programming rights from Movies OK.

In April 2024, ATN Movies now airs programming from Star Gold.
