= Filmy (Canadian TV channel) =

- Filmy Canada logo
- Country: Canada
- Broadcast area: National
- Headquarters: Mississauga, Ontario

Programming
- Picture format: 480i (SDTV)

Ownership
- Owner: SoundView Entertainment

History
- Launched: April 29, 2009

Filmy is a Canadian Category B Hindi language specialty channel owned by SoundView Entertainment Inc.

Filmy broadcasts Bollywood films, music programs, and other Bollywood film based programming.

== History ==
In October 2007, SoundView Entertainment Inc. was granted approval by the Canadian Radio-television and Telecommunications Commission (CRTC) to launch a television channel called Sahara Filmy, described as "a national, third-language ethnic Category 2 specialty service devoted to the Hindi-speaking community. The programming schedule shall only consist of feature films, made-for-TV movies, actor interviews, documentaries and similar movie-related programming."

The channel launched as Filmy on April 29, 2009 initially on Rogers Cable.

== See also ==
- Filmy
