= ATN Aastha TV =

ATN Aastha
- Country: Canada
- Broadcast area: National
- Headquarters: Markham, Ontario

Programming
- Picture format: 480i (SDTV)

Ownership
- Owner: Asian Television Network (name licensed by Vedic Broadcasting)

History
- Launched: October 2, 2005; 20 years ago

Links
- Website: ATN Aastha

ATN Aastha is a Canadian exempt Category B Hindi language specialty channel owned by Asian Television Network (ATN).

ATN Aastha broadcasts religious and spiritual programming in Hindi, Gujarati, and English, focusing mainly on the teachings and principles of Hinduism. Programming includes discourses, devotional music, meditation and yoga techniques, coverage of religious festivals, and ancient Indian scientific practices such as ayurveda. Programming is primarily sourced from Aastha International, an Indian-based television channel, in addition to Canadian content.

== History ==
In April 2005, ATN was granted approval from the Canadian Radio-television and Telecommunications Commission (CRTC) to launch a television channel called ATN - South Asian Devotional Music & Discourse Channel, described as "a national ethnic Category 2 pay television programming undertaking devoted to religious programming presented in South Asian languages."

The channel launched on October 19, 2005, as ATN Aastha.

On September 13, 2012, the CRTC approved Asian Television Network's request to convert ATN Aastha from a licensed Category B specialty service to an exempted Cat. B third language service.
