= ATN Punjabi =

Canadian TV channel

- Country: Canada
- Broadcast area: National
- Headquarters: Markham, Ontario

Programming
- Picture format: 480i (SDTV)

Ownership
- Owner: Asian Television Network

History
- Launched: 2001; 24 years ago
- Former names: Alpha ETC Punjabi

Links
- Website: ATN Punjabi

ATN Alpha ETC Punjabi (or simply ATN Punjabi) is a Canadian Punjabi-language specialty channel owned by Asian Television Network. It broadcasts programming from India and Canadian content in the form of movies, news, dramas, comedies, and talk shows.

As of August 2009, ATN Alpha ETC Punjabi no longer broadcasts Shabad Gurbani from the Harimandir Sahib in Amritsar, Punjab in Canada as ATN no longer has the rights for the Gurbani. Gurbani from the Harimandir Sahib now airs on PTC Punjabi Canada.

== History ==
On November 24, 2000, ATN was granted approval from the Canadian Radio-television and Telecommunications Commission (CRTC) to launch a television channel called Punjabi Channel, described as "The licensee shall provide a national ethnic Category 2 specialty television service targeting the Punjabi-speaking community."

Alpha ETC Punjabi logo

On August 30, 2013, the CRTC approved Asian Television Network's request to convert ATN Alpha ETC Punjabi from a licensed Category B specialty service to an exempted Cat. B third language service.

On April 1, 2019, ATN Alpha ETC Punjabi was renamed 'ATN Punjabi' due to loss of programming from Alpha ETC Punjabi.
