= Commonwealth Broadcasting Network =

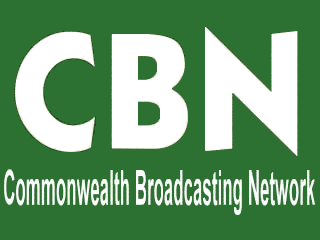
- CBN logo
- Country: Canada
- Broadcast area: National
- Headquarters: Markham, Ontario

Programming
- Picture format: 480i (SDTV)

Ownership
- Owner: Asian Television Network

History
- Launched: April 19, 2005 (pay service); June 17, 2012 (specialty service)
- Former names: ATN Caribbean (2005–late 2000s)

Links
- Website: CBN

Commonwealth Broadcasting Network (CBN) is a Canadian English language discretionary specialty channel owned by Asian Television Network (ATN).

CBN primarily focuses on cricket programming such as live and tape-delayed matches featuring Commonwealth nations. CBN also broadcasts a select number of lifestyle, entertainment, and informational series aimed primarily at the Caribbean and African communities.

== History ==
In November 2000, ATN, through one of its subsidiaries, was granted approval by the Canadian Radio-television and Telecommunications Commission (CRTC) to launch a television channel called Caribbean & African Network, described as "a national ethnic Category 2 pay television service targeting Caribbean and African communities."

The channel was launched on April 19, 2005, as ATN Caribbean on Rogers Cable, airing a variety of programming aimed at the Caribbean and African communities in Canada with such programming as sports, music, dramas, and more.

The channel later rebranded in the later 2000s as the Commonwealth Broadcasting Network (CBN) and began focusing more on cricket and other programming that would appeal to those outside the Caribbean and African communities, such as other Commonwealth nations.

On September 25, 2012, CBN's broadcasting licence to operate as a pay service was revoked at ATN's request. The channel subsequently re-launched as a regular specialty service on June 17, 2012, under the following license: ATN Cricket Channel One

== External links & Connection link ==
- Official website
- Weekly schedule

cba.org.ukhttps://www.cba.org.uk Commonwealth Broadcasting Association
