= ATN Zoom =

- ATN Zoom logo
- Country: Canada
- Broadcast area: National
- Headquarters: Markham, Ontario

Programming
- Picture format: 480i (SDTV)

Ownership
- Owner: Asian Television Network (name licensed by The Times Group)

History
- Launched: February 17, 2011; 14 years ago

Links
- Website: ATN Zoom

ATN Zoom is a Canadian Category B Hindi language specialty channel owned by Asian Television Network (ATN). It broadcasts programming from Zoom as well as Canadian content.

ATN Zoom is an Indian entertainment channel whose sole focus is Bollywood and the Indian entertainment industry. It features entertainment news, interviews with the top stars, movie reviews, music and more.
