= ATN SAB TV =

- ATN SAB TV logo
- Country: Canada
- Broadcast area: National
- Headquarters: Markham, Ontario

Programming
- Picture format: 480i (SDTV)

Ownership
- Owner: Asian Television Network (name licensed by Sony Pictures Networks India)

History
- Launched: February 17, 2011; 14 years ago

Links
- Website: ATN SAB TV

ATN SAB TV is a Canadian Category B Hindi language specialty channel owned by Asian Television Network (ATN). It broadcasts programming from SAB TV as well as Canadian content.

ATN SAB TV is a family entertainment channel with a focus on comedy-themed programming. It airs various comedy programs including light hearted family shows, silent comedies and dramedies.

== History ==
ATN SAB TV was licensed by the CRTC on February 28, 2011 as ATN Comedy Channel One. It officially launched on February 17, 2011 as ATN SAB TV.
