= ATN Gujarati =

- ATN Gujarati logo
- Country: Canada
- Broadcast area: National
- Headquarters: Markham, Ontario

Programming
- Picture format: 480i (SDTV)

Ownership
- Owner: Asian Television Network

History
- Launched: October 19, 2005
- Former names: ATN Zee Gujarati (2005 - 2009)

Links
- Website: ATN Gujarati

ATN Gujarati is a Canadian exempt Category B Gujarati language specialty channel owned by Asian Television Network (ATN).

ATN Gujarati broadcasts programming focused on family entertainment and culture. Programming includes talk shows, current affairs, news, films, and festival-based programs. Programming is primarily sourced from TV9, an Indian-based television channel, as well as Canadian content.

== History ==
In November 2000, ATN was granted approval from the Canadian Radio-television and Telecommunications Commission (CRTC) to launch a television channel called Gujarati Channel, described as "a national ethnic Category 2 specialty television service targeting the Gujarati-speaking community".

The channel launched on October 19, 2005, as ATN Zee Gujarati under a licensing agreement with Zee Entertainment Enterprises, the owners of Zee Gujarati, an Indian-based channel.

ATN Zee Gujarati logo

In May 2009, Zee Gujarati ceased operations in India due to losses at the network. As a result, in June 2009, ATN rebranded the network ATN Gujarati and began supplying much of its programming from TV9.

On August 30, 2013, the CRTC approved Asian Television Network's request to convert ATN Gujarati from a licensed Category B specialty service to an exempted Cat. B third language service.
