= ATN Punjabi 5 =

Canadian TV channel

- Country: Canada
- Broadcast area: National
- Headquarters: Markham, Ontario

Programming
- Picture format: 480i (SDTV)

Ownership
- Owner: Asian Television Network

History
- Launched: September 15, 2010
- Former names: ATN JUS Punjabi (2010-2014)

Links
- Website: ATN Punjabi 5

ATN Punjabi 5 is a Canadian pay television channel owned by Asian Television Network. It broadcasts Punjabi-language programming from India as well as local content produced by ATN.

ATN Punjabi 5 is a cultural and spiritual channel that caters to the Punjabi/Sikh communities in Canada. Programming includes live Sikh events from around the globe, spiritual programming, and local cultural and religious events from various Sikh communities in Canada.

== History ==
JUS Punjabi logo

ATN Punjabi 5 originally launched on September 15, 2010 as ATN JUS Punjabi, in partnership with American-Punjabi broadcaster JUS Punjabi. Via a programming supply agreement, ATN launched a Canadian version of the American service.

In October 2014, the channel was renamed 'ATN Punjabi 5' due to a loss of programming from JUS Punjabi.
