= ATN Bangla (Canada) =

Canadian Bengali-language television channel

- ATN Bangla logo
- Country: Canada
- Broadcast area: National
- Headquarters: Markham, Ontario

Programming
- Picture format: 480i (SDTV)

Ownership
- Owner: Asian Television Network

History
- Launched: October 19, 2005

Links
- Website: ATN Bangla

ATN Bangla is a Canadian exempt Category B Bengali language pay television channel owned by Asian Television Network (ATN).

ATN Bangla broadcasts a variety of programming in the Bengali language including news, films, television dramas and talk shows. It airs programming from foreign sources in India and Bangladesh as well as locally produced Canadian content.

== History ==
In April 2005, ATN was granted approval from the Canadian Radio-television and Telecommunications Commission (CRTC) to launch a television channel called ATN - Bangla Channel One, described as "a national ethnic Category 2 pay television programming undertaking devoted to programming of interest to persons who speak Bengali."

Original ATN Bangla logo

The channel launched on October 19, 2005 as ATN Bangla.

On September 13, 2012, the CRTC approved Asian Television Network's request to convert ATN Bangla from a licensed Category B specialty service to an exempted Cat. B third language service.

In September 2014, ATN lost the rights to programming from ATN Bangla in Bangladesh. The channel was subsequently re-branded with a generic logo but retains the same name and now airs foreign programming from India as well as Bangladesh.
