= ATN Food Food =

- ATN Food Food logo
- Country: Canada
- Broadcast area: National
- Headquarters: Markham, Ontario

Programming
- Picture format: 480i (SDTV)

Ownership
- Owner: Asian Television Network (name licensed by Sanjeev Kapoor and Astro and Mogae Consultants)

History
- Launched: November 29, 2012

Links
- Website: ATN Food Food

ATN Food Food is a Canadian exempt Category B Hindi language specialty channel owned by Asian Television Network (ATN). It broadcasts programming from Food Food as well as Canadian content.

ATN Food Food is a lifestyle channel with a focus on Indian cuisine and food culture. Programming includes cooking shows, reality series, instructional shows, and food-related travel shows.

== Programming ==
These shows have aired on ATN Food Food:

- Budget Kitchen
- Mummy Magic
- Roti Raasta Aur India
- Sanjeev Kapoor's Kitchen
- Style Chef
- Tea Time
- Turban Tadka
- Cook Smart

== History ==
ATN Food Food was licensed by the CRTC on September 7, 2012, as ATN South Asian Cooking Channel 1. It officially launched on November 29, 2012, as ATN Food Food.

On September 28, 2018, the CRTC approved Asian Television Network's request to convert ATN Food Food from a licensed Category B specialty service to an exempted Cat. B third language service.
