= ATN Jaya TV =

- Logo used since 1999
- Country: Canada
- Broadcast area: National
- Headquarters: Markham, Ontario

Programming
- Picture format: 480i SDTV

Ownership
- Owner: Asian Television Network (name licensed by All India Anna Dravida Munnetra Kazhagam)

History
- Former names: ATN Tamil Channel

Links
- Website: ATN Jaya TV

ATN Jaya TV (still unofficially known as ATN Tamil) is a Canadian exempt Category B Tamil language specialty channel owned by Asian Television Network (ATN). It broadcasts programming from Jaya TV, a popular television channel from India, and Canadian content.

Programming includes dramas, sitcoms, talk shows, movies and more. ATN Jaya TV was previously known on air as ATN Tamil Channel before a deal with Jaya TV was made and the name change occurred.

== History ==
On November 24, 2000, ATN was granted approval from the Canadian Radio-television and Telecommunications Commission (CRTC) to launch a television channel called Tamil Channel, described as "The licensee shall provide a national ethnic Category 2 specialty television service targeting the Tamil-speaking community."

On August 30, 2013, the CRTC approved Asian Television Network's request to convert ATN Jaya TV from a licensed Category B specialty service to an exempted Cat. B third language service.
