= ATN Punjabi Plus =

- Country: Canada
- Broadcast area: National
- Headquarters: Markham, Ontario

Programming
- Picture format: 480i (SDTV)

Ownership
- Owner: Asian Television Network

History
- Launched: September 15, 2010
- Former names: ATN Punjjabi TV (2010–2012); ATN GET Punjabi (2012–2014)

Links
- Website: ATN Punjabi Plus

ATN Punjabi Plus is a Canadian pay television channel owned by Asian Television Network. It broadcasts programming from India as well as Canadian content. Programming includes dramas, movies, music, news, spiritual programming and much more.

== History ==
ATN Punjjabi TV logo

ATN GET Punjabi logo

ATN Punjabi Plus originally launched on September 15, 2010, as ATN Punjjabi TV, as an exempt ethnic channel under the CRTC's Exempt Ethnic service policy.

On September 5, 2012, the channel was re-branded ATN GET Punjabi to reflect the change undertaken by GET Punjabi in India from which this Canadian service derives its programming.

In August 2014, the channel was renamed ATN Punjabi Plus, to reflect the loss of programming from GET Punjabi.
