= ATN Cricket Plus =

- ATN Cricket Plus logo
- Country: Canada
- Broadcast area: National
- Headquarters: Markham, Ontario

Programming
- Picture format: 480i (SDTV)

Ownership
- Owner: Asian Television Network

History
- Launched: February 2007; 19 years ago (pay service); June 17, 2012; 14 years ago (specialty service)
- Closed: October 25, 2012; 13 years ago (pay service)

Links
- Website: ATN Cricket Plus

ATN Cricket Plus is a Canadian English language discretionary specialty channel owned by Asian Television Network (ATN). ATN Cricket Plus broadcasts programming related to the sport of cricket including live and tape-delayed matches and news and highlight series.

== History ==
In April 2006, ATN was granted approval from the Canadian Radio-television and Telecommunications Commission (CRTC) to launch a television channel called ATN - Asian Sports Network (ASN), described as "a national, English-language Category 2 pay television programming service devoted to the game of cricket. The service shall broadcast live cricket games from various venues around the world and shall showcase local cricket games. The service shall also broadcast discussions about the game of cricket."

ATN announced on January 31, 2007 plans to launch the channel as ATN Cricket Plus, in a licensing partnership with DirecTV, who launched their own Cricket Plus channel in the United States in 2006 with Taj TV. The channel launched in February 2007 on Rogers Cable.

On September 25, 2012, ATN Cricket Plus' broadcasting license to operate as a pay service was revoked at ATN's request. The channel subsequently re-launched as a regular specialty service on June 17, 2012, under the following license: ATN - Asian Sports Network.
