= Patanjali (disambiguation) =

Patanjali was an ancient Indian author, mystic and philosopher.

Patanjali or Pathanjali may also refer to:

- Patanjali Ayurved, an Indian FMCG company producing Ayurvedic products
- Patanjali Foods, Indian food products company
- Patanjali Yoga, Indian TV show
- Patanjali Yogpeeth, a Yoga institute in Haridwar, Uttarakhand, India
- K. N. Y. Patanjali, an Indian journalist and writer
- M. Patanjali Sastri, 2nd Chief Justice of India

== See also ==
- Yoga Sutras of Patanjali, early Yoga text in Sanskrit from ancient India by Patanjali
