= Aastha TV =

Indian Sanatan spiritual television channel

Aastha
- Type: Television Channel
- Country: India
- Broadcast area: Worldwide
- Network: Vedic Broadcasting Ltd.
- Headquarters: Noida, Uttar Pradesh, India

Programming
- Language: Hindi
- Picture format: DVB, SD

Ownership
- Owner: Aacharya Balkrishna
- Sister channels: Aastha Bhajan; Vedic TV; Dharma Sandesh; Aastha Tamil; Aastha Kannada; Aastha Telugu; Aastha Gujarati; Aastha USA/Canada; Aastha UK/Europe; Aastha Prime 1

History
- Launched: 2000; 26 years ago
- Replaced: Vedic Broadcasting Limited
- Former names: Aastha Broadcasting

Links
- Website: aasthatv.com

Availability

Streaming media
- YouTube: Official Channel

Aastha TV is an Indian spiritual Television channel, founded by the, Mr. Kirit C. Mehta and now owned by Acharya Balkrishna in India. Established in 2000, by Mr. Kirit C. Mehta, it is owned by Aastha Broadcasting Network Ltd. The network's directors are Santosh Kumar Jain and Prabhat Kumar Jain. In 2005, the channel started the broadcast of Aastha International through UK affiliate as it had done previously in the United States as a 24x7 service on the DTH platform of BSkyB in UK. By 2006 it was reaching 160 countries around the world.

Its programs feature spiritual discourses, socio-cultural ceremonies and religious events, accompanied by meditation techniques and devotional music. They include information about places of pilgrimage, festivals, and vedic science, such as Yoga, Ayurveda, astrology.

== Notable persons ==
- Swami Ramdev
- Acharya Balkrishna
- Morari Bapu
- Rakesh Jhaveri
- Deepakbhai Desai
- Sukhabodhananda
- Sister Shivani
- Rajiv Dixit
- Avdhoot Shivanand
