= Bharatiya Shiksha Board =

Indian school education board

Bhartiya Shiksha Board
- भारतीय शिक्षा बोर्ड
- Abbreviation: BSB
- Formation: 9 March 2019; 7 years ago
- Type: School education board
- Legal status: Active
- Headquarters: Haridwar, Uttarakhand, India
- Location: Noida, Uttar Pradesh, India
- Key people: Ramdev (Adhyaksha); Balkrishna (Sachiv)
- Affiliations: Ministry of Education (India)
- Website: bsb.org.in

Bhartiya Shiksha Board (BSB), also spelt Bharatiya Shiksha Board is an Indian school education board. The board has received equivalence from the Association of Indian Universities for its Grade 10 and Grade 12 board examination qualifications. In September 2023, the All India Council for Technical Education issued a circular asking technical universities and AICTE-approved institutions to consider Bhartiya Shiksha Board as a pan-India school education board. According to the board's official website, it was notified as a National School Education Board by the Department of School Education and Literacy, Ministry of Education, Government of India, through notification no. F.11-3/2016-Sch.3 dated 3 February 2023.

== History ==
The idea of establishing a national school board focused on Indian knowledge traditions was associated with yoga teacher Ramdev. In 2015, Ramdev, through the Haridwar-based Vedic Education Research Institute, submitted a proposal to the Union government for a school board combining traditional Indian education with modern curriculum.

The board was later established under the framework of Maharshi Sandipani Rashtriya Ved Vidya Pratishthan and was associated with Patanjali Yogpeeth Trust. According to a report in The New Indian Express, AICTE stated in its circular that BSB was established on 9 March 2019 and was approved by the Education Ministry on 25 January 2023.

== Recognition and equivalence ==
Bhartiya Shiksha Board has been granted equivalence by the Association of Indian Universities for Grade 10 and Grade 12 qualifications, according to the board's official website and media reports. AICTE's 2023 circular described BSB as a pan-India school education board for the purposes of technical universities and AICTE-approved institutions.

== Educational approach ==
The board describes its educational approach as combining modern subjects such as mathematics, science and technology with Sanskrit, yoga and Indian knowledge traditions. Its stated mission includes developing students with scientific temper, ethical values and an understanding of Indian philosophical thought.

In February 2026, the Bhartiya Shiksha Board directed its affiliated and associated schools to implement the National Curriculum Framework for Foundational Stage 2022 and the National Curriculum Framework for School Education 2023 from the 2026–27 academic session, beginning 1 April 2026.

The board's academic framework follows the 5+3+3+4 curricular structure and includes competency-based learning, multilingual education, arts, physical education and vocational education.

== National Games ==
The board organises national-level sports competitions for students of its affiliated schools. The second Bhartiya Shiksha Board National Games were held in phases during the 2026–27 academic session. The first phase was held at Acharyakulam, Haridwar, in September 2026, with competitions including kabaddi, badminton, basketball, football and wrestling.

== Governance ==
The official website lists the governing body of the board as the Bhartiya Shiksha Board Society. It lists Ramdev as Adhyaksha and Acharya Balkrishna as Sachiv among its office bearers and members.

== Criticism and controversy ==
In June 2021, The Indian Express reported that the process of setting up the board involved objections from Maharshi Sandipani Rashtriya Ved Vidya Pratishthan and that the Union government proceeded with the proposal despite concerns raised during the process. The same report stated that the proposal marked a shift from an earlier plan for a government-run Vedic education board under MSRVVP.

== See also ==
- Central Board of Secondary Education
- Council for the Indian School Certificate Examinations
- National Education Policy 2020
- Maharshi Sandipani Rashtriya Ved Vidya Pratishthan
- Patanjali Yogpeeth
