= Swami Avdheshanand Giri =

Indian saint and guru (born 1962)

Swami Avdheshanand Giri Acharya Mahamandaleshwar
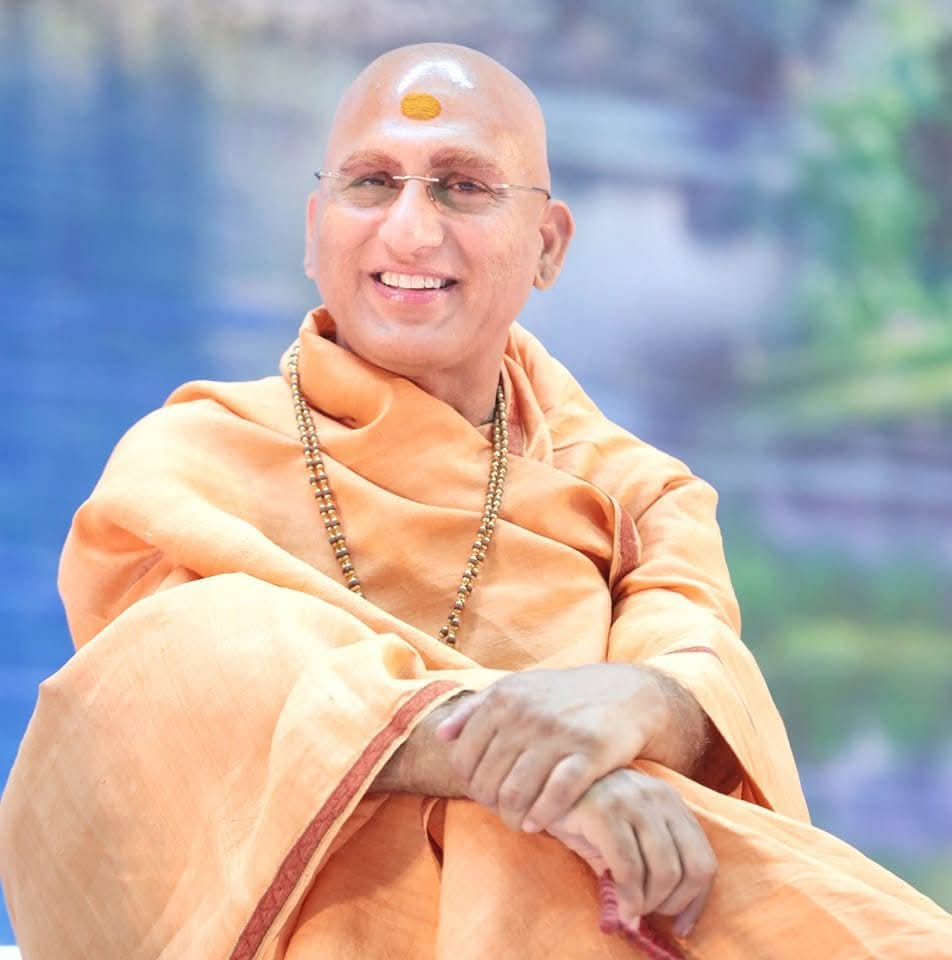

Personal life
- Born: Khurja, Uttar Pradesh, India
- Notable work(s): Eternal Wisdom, Vision of Self, Towards Divinity "You live only once"
- Website: www.prabhupremisangh.org

Religious life
- Religion: Hinduism
- Order: Juna Akhara
- Creed: Dasanami Sampradaya

Religious career
- Present post: Acharya Mahamandaleshwar and Pithadhishwar of Juna Akhara
- Post: Pithadhishwar and Acharya Mahamandaleshwar of Juna Akhara ; President of Hindu Dharm Acharya Sabha

Swami Avdheshanand Giri (born 1962) is an Indian Hindu spiritual guru, writer and philosopher. He is the current Acharya Mahamandaleshwar of Sri Panch Dashnam Juna Akhara. Juna Akhara is the largest Akhara for Naga Sadhus in India. Giri has initiated about one million Naga sadhus. His Ashram is situated at Kankhal, Haridwar. He is the president of Hindu Dharm Acharya Sabha and also a board member of the World Council of Religious Leaders.

== Early life ==
Swami ji was born in Khurja, Bulandshahr district, Uttar Pradesh, India in a Brahmin family. He said that during his childhood, he often talked about his previous birth. He left home for Sannyasa at the age of 17.

After leaving his house for Sannyasa, He met Swami Avdhoot Prakash ji who was an expert and had a great knowledge of the Vedas and scriptures. Swami ji learned Vedant philosophy and Yoga from him.

He went to Himalayas for meditation and penance. After deep meditation and penance, Swami Avdheshanand Giri ji came out of the Himalayan caves in the year 1985 and met his Guru- The former Shankaracharya Swami Satyamitranand Giri. He took diksha from Swami Satyamitranand Giri ji and entered Juna Akhara under the name of Avdheshanand Giri.

In the Kumbh of Haridwar, in 1998, all the saints of Juna Akhara together appointed Swami ji as Acharya Mahamandaleshwar.

He is also the member of Sri Amarnath Shrine Board.

Currently, he is the President of the prestigious Samanavya Seva Trust, Haridwar, which has many branches in India and abroad. This trust includes the world famous Bharat Mata Mandir, Haridwar.

He is referred as "Junapeethadhiswar Acharya Mahamandaleshwar Swami Avdheshanand Giri" in the Akhara by his disciples. Prime Minister of India Narendra Modi also used the same for him in his Twitter account and in the telephonic conversation.

== International ==
Giri has presided over several international conferences on climate change, brotherhood across different sects and has been invited to several international forums. He is a board member of the World Council of Religious Leaders. He was the chief speaker at UNO for the “Responsible Leadership Summit” held in May 2019, which was attended by around 200 representatives from various sections of the society from across the world. In 2011, he also participated in the ‘2010 Interfaith G8 Summit’ which was held in Winnipeg, Canada. He was the keynote speaker at the “Parliament of the World’s Religious (Vishwa Dharma Mahasabha)” held in Melbourne in 2009. In the same year, he participated in the ‘Hindu Jewish Summit (Hindu Yahudi Shikhar Sammelan)’ in Jerusalem. In 2008, he also participated in the Israel’s Presidential Conference - “Facing Tomorrow”.

In August 2017, Giri participated in the “Samvad II: Global Initiative on Conflict avoidance and Environmental Consciousness” which took place Yangon, Myanmar. The conference was inaugurated by Uttar Pradesh Governor Ram Naik and concluded by Uttar Pradesh Chief Minister Yogi Adityanath. The conference was organized by Vivekanand International Foundation (India), Sitagu International Bodh Academy and University, Myanmar and Japan Foundation in collaboration with Hindu Dharm Acharya Sabha.

In September 2019, Giri participated in “Samvad III: Global Hindu-Buddhist Initiative on Conflict Avoidance” which was held in Ulaanbaatar, Mongolia. From India, Sushil Modi (Rajya Sabha MP), S. Gurumurthy (Chairman of VIF) and Ravi Shankar along with the High Ambassadors of Japan, Korea, Sri Lanka, Myanmar and Thailand also participated in the event.

In May 2022, he was invited to the Muslim World League convention held In Riyadh.

== Social initiative ==
In Haridwar, an old age home and a physiotherapy center are running under the Samanavya Seva Trust. Shiv Ganga Project is an educational and water conservation project going on Bhopal in Madhya Pradesh.

In order to early and prematurely end the Haridwar Kumbh in April 2021 during the second wave of Corona (COVID-19), Prime Minister Narendra Modi spoke to Giri on a phone call and appealed to keep the Kumbh symbolic, after which, Giri, on behalf of Juna Akhara announced the formal completion of Kumbh.

== Philosophy and preaching ==
Giri has deep knowledge of Vedant and ancient Indian philosophy subjects. He was awarded degree of Vidya Vachaspati by the Jagadguru Ramanandacharya Rajasthan Sanskrit University, on 17 April 2025, in the presence of Shri Haribhau Bagde, Governor of Rajasthan and Shri Om Birla, Lok sabha speaker. He is a graduate in Sanskrit and was awarded the honorary degree of D. Litt from Vikram University, Ujjain in March 2008.

== Spirituality ==
Giri is a regular speaker on various major TV channels like Sanskar TV and Aastha TV and at many major events such as Kumbh Mela, and programs such as the Encyclopedia of Hinduism and the Vivekanand International Foundation.

Giri also writes articles as a columnist in several newspapers.

Giri has many high profile people. Several Bollywood actors and politicians have been visiting his Harihar Ashram in Haridwar. In October 2019, the President of India, Sri Ram Nath Kovind visited Harihar Ashram when he had gone to attend the convocation ceremony of IIT Roorkee. In 2018, Home Minister Amit Shah and Rashtriya Swayamsevak Sangh chief Mohan Bhagwat also visited Harihar Ashram.

He was again invited to the Rashtrapati Bhavan by President of India Ram Nath Kovind in 2019.

== Selected bibliography ==
- Giri, Acharya Swami Avdheshanand (14 August 2013). Vision of Self. India: Partridge Publishing. pp. 1–272. ISBN 978-1-4828-1046-2.
- Giri, Acharya Swami Avdheshanand (19 May 2014). Eternal Wisdom. Singapore: Partridge Publishing. pp. 1–154. ISBN 978-1-4828-2324-0.
- Giri, Acharya Swami Avdheshanand (2019). You Only Live Once:108 Nuggets of Wisdom. Westland. pp. 1–172. ISBN 9789388754699.
- Giri, Acharya Swami Avdheshanand (14 August 2023). The Path to Ananda. Westland. pp. 1–130. ISBN 9789388754699.

== Awards and honors ==
• He was awarded for his efforts in the field of harmony and spiritual awakening. The award was presented by former President of India Bharat Ratna Shri Pranab Mukherjee at Vigyan Bhawan, New Delhi.

• SIES National Eminence Award, 2019

• Hindu Renaissance Award, 2008 in California, USA (This award is given by Hindustan magazine to those personalities who are a source of inspiration for Hindu religion and strengthen it)
