= Avdhoot Shivanand =

Indian spiritual leader

Personal life
- Spouse: Sadhna Shivanand
- Website: www.shivyog.com

Religious life
- Religion: Sanatan
- Founder of: Shiv Yog

Senior posting
- Teacher: 108 Swami Jagannath ji. Dattatreya Legacy.

Avdhoot Shivanand Ji is an Indian spiritual leader and founder of ShivYog, an organization that offers meditation programs. He also conducts public discourses which are broadcast on multiple television channels such as Aastha TV, Adhyatm TV and Sanskar TV. He is also involved in various social development activities, which has bestowed him with various honors from communities.

== Biography ==
Avdhoot Shivanand was born on 26 March 1955 in Delhi and grew up in Rajasthan. At the age of 8, he came in contact with Himalayan yogi 108 Swami Jagganath ji who inspired him to pursue a spiritual path. Thereafter, he visited many sacred places in India for meditation. During his travels he practiced and meditated on the teachings of Swami Jagannath. He decided to dedicate his life to spread spirituality and meditation around the world. From 1990, he started conducting talks & workshops on Shivyog and Advait Shri Vidya Sadhana around India. In 1995 he created the Shivyog Foundation with the aim to share the wisdom of meditation and inner healing to everyone. The first ShivYog ashram was built in Delhi where he taught meditation. Today there are 3 ShivYog ashrams in Delhi, Lucknow and Karjat respectively and ShivYog courses are held at more than 100 locations in India. Shivyog programs are also conducted worldwide in close to 30 countries from the year 2000. In September 2016, P D Patil, the Chancellor of DY Patil University conferred the Honorary Degree of Doctorate in Cosmic-Science, their contribution in SiddhaHealing Methods and philanthropy work on Human Health.Doctor Emeritus to Avdhoot Shivanand for contribution in modern spiritual science, and H. H Avdhoot Shivanand became Indian Himalayan Yogi to pursue Phd.

Since 2020 his public appearances have drastically reduced.
