= Workplace spirituality =

Grassroots movement since early 1920s

Workplace spirituality or spirituality in the workplace describes a movement and academic discourse exploring how and why individuals seek to live their faith and/or spiritual values in the workplace. Spiritual, or spirit-centered, leadership is frequently associated with the workplace spirituality movement.

== History ==
The 1990s saw a proliferation of publications dedicated to exploring the role of spirituality and spiritual learning in workplaces and organizational life. In the 1990 first edition of The Fifth Discipline: The Art and Practice of the Learning Organization, Peter Senge declared that leaders should reframe the way they understand their roles to "realize the almost sacredness of their responsibility for the lives of so many people." Matthew Fox's The Reinvention of Work: A New Vision of Livelihood for Our Time (1994) related workers' individual "inner work" to the cultural "outer work" of revisioning society by building a new cosmology through the invention of new rituals, including in workplaces. Other notable books on spirituality in the workplace published during this time include Jay Conger's Spirit at Work: Discovering the Spirituality in Leadership, published in 1994, and Gilbert W. Fairholm's Capturing the Heart of Leadership: Spirituality and Community in the New American Workplace, published in 1997.

In the late 1990s, the Academy of Management formed a special interest group called the Management, Spirituality and Religion interest group. This is a professional association of management professors from all over the world who are teaching and doing research on spirituality and religion in the workplace. A partner organization to AOM's Management, Spirituality and Religion interest group, the International Association of Management, Spirituality, and Religion publishes the Journal of Management, Spirituality, and Religion as well as a book series.

Human resource development scholar-practitioners have noted a trend toward using words like "contemplative" and "mindfulness" instead of "spiritual" and "spirituality" in academic articles and publications discussing spiritual knowing in workplace learning. While workplace spirituality initiatives can be a way of caring for workers, many employers also implement them to increase productivity and profit.

=== Contributing Social Factors ===
1. Mergers and acquisitions destroyed the psychological contract that workers had a job for life. This led some people to search for more of a sense of inner security rather than looking for external security from a corporation.
2. Baby Boomers hitting middle age resulting in a large demographic part of the population asking meaningful questions about life and purpose.
3. The millennium created an opportunity for people all over the world to reflect on where the human race has come from, where it is headed in the future, and what role business plays in the future of the human race.

=== Key Organizations ===
- International Center for Spirit at Work (ICSW)
- European Baha'i Business Forum (EBBF)
- World Business Academy (WBA)
- Spiritual Business Network (SBN)
- Foundation for Workplace Spirituality

== Framings of Spirituality in the Workplace ==
Organizational psychology literature describes a "vertical" spirituality, related to personal connection to a god or spirit or the wider universe, and a "horizontal" spirituality, emphasizing service to and compassion for others as well as work informed by a strong ethical sense and aligned with one's values. Vertical spirituality in the workplace might include meditation rooms, accommodation of personal prayer schedules, moments of silence before meetings, retreats or time off for spiritual development, and group prayer or reflection. Horizontal spirituality might encompass more intangible cultural aspects of everyday organizational life, such as the qualitative sense of belonging to a work team or commitment to an organization as a whole or to an institution's mission.

== Theories ==
Different theories over the years have influenced the development of workplace spirituality.

- Spiritual Leadership Theory (2003) developed within an intrinsic motivation model that incorporates vision, hope/faith, and altruistic love
- Social Exchange Theory (1964) attempts to explain the social factors which affect the interaction of the person in a reciprocal relationship
- Identity Theory (1991) claims a connection between workplace spirituality and organizational engagement

== See also ==
- Benefit corporation – Type of for-profit entity
- Dominic Steele – Australian Anglican minister, ministry includes workplace Bible groups
- Swami Sukhabodhananda – Indian motivational speaker
- John Sentamu – Archbishop of York from 2005 to 2020, advocate for faith in the workplace
- Workplace Religious Freedom Act – 2005 law in the United States
- A Practical Reference to Religious Diversity for Operational Police and Emergency Services – Policing publication
