= Indira Gandhi Super Thermal Power Project =

Power station in India

Indira Gandhi Thermal Power Project
- Country: India
- Location: Jharli, Jhajjar Haryana
- Coordinates: 28°28′43″N 76°22′31″E
- Status: Operational
- Owner: Aravali Power Company India Limited
- Operator: Aravali Power Company India Limited

Thermal power station
- Primary fuel: Coal

Power generation
- Units operational: 3 x 500 MW
- Nameplate capacity: 1,500 MW

Indira Gandhi Super Thermal Power Project is located between Khanpur Khurd (to the south of the plant) and Jharli village (to the north of the plant) in Jhajjar district of Haryana, India.

== History ==
Aravali Power Company Private Limited (APCPL) is a joint venture company with 50% share of NTPC Ltd, 25% of Haryana Power Generation Company Ltd (HPGCL, Haryana State company), and 25% of Indraprastha Power Generation Company Ltd (IPGCL, Delhi State company). The company was registered on 21 December 2006 as a private limited company of Central Government of India, Government of Delhi and Haryana. APCPL has constructed a coal based power plant near Village Jharli, District Jhajjar (Haryana) named Indira Gandhi Super Thermal Power Project (IGSTPP). Presently under Stage-I, a power plant of 3× 500 MW capacity is constructed, whose all 3 units are commissioned. It is the largest thermal power plant located in Haryana.

== Capacity ==
Stage	Unit number	Installed capacity (MW)	Date of commissioning	Status
Stage I	1	500	2010 October	Running
Stage I	2	500	2011 November	Running
Stage I	3	500	2012 March	Running
