= Patanjali Ayurved =

Indian multinational conglomerate company

- Type: Private
- Industry: Conglomerate
- Founded: 2006; 20 years ago
- Founder: Acharya Balkrishna; Baba Ramdev
- Headquarters: Haridwar, Uttarakhand, India
- Area served: Worldwide; Indian subcontinent; Middle East
- Key people: Balkrishna (chairperson, managing director & CEO)
- Products: Ayurvedic medicine; Consumer goods; Healthcare; Personal care; Cosmetics; Cleaning agents; Beverages; Fashion; Foods
- Revenue: ▲₹9,872 crore (US$1.1 billion) (2021)
- Net income: ▲₹485 crore (US$52 million) (2021)
- Owner: Balkrishna (94%)
- Number of employees: 6,395 (November 2023)
- Subsidiaries: Patanjali Foods; Patanjali Paridhan; Patanjali Renewable; Herboved; Advance Navigation and Solar Technologies; Patanjali University
- Website: patanjaliayurved.net

Patanjali Ayurved is an Indian multinational conglomerate holding company, based in Haridwar. It was founded by Ramdev and Balkrishna in 2006. Its office is in Delhi, with manufacturing units and headquarters in the industrial area of Haridwar. The company manufactures cosmetics, ayurvedic medicine, personal care and food products. The CEO of the company, with a 94-percent share hold, is Balkrishna. Ramdev represents the company and makes strategic decisions. The company has faced various controversies over its misleading promotions and false claims for COVID-19 treatment.

== History ==
Ramdev and Balkrishna established Patanjali Ayurved in 2006. Balkrishna owns 94 percent of the company, and the remainder is dispersed among other individuals. In May 2021, Balkrishna had a net worth of US$2.3 billion.

According to CLSA and HSBC, Patanjali was one of the fastest-growing FMCG companies in India in 2016. It was valued at ₹3,000 crore (equivalent to ₹47 billion or US$500 million in 2026). Patanjali estimated its annual turnover for the 2016–17 fiscal year at ₹10,216 crore (US$1.1 billion). In fiscal year 2022, Patanjali Ayurved posted revenues of Rs 10,664.46 crore. According to a report by India Infoline (IIFL), at least 13 listed companies would be affected by Patanjali's success; they included Hindustan Unilever, Colgate, Dabur, ITC, and Godrej Consumer Products.

In 2025, Patanjali Ayurved along with DS Group acquired Magma General Insurance for ₹4,500 crore.

In December 2025, The Government of Tripura partnered with Patanjali Ayurved for a project in Tripura State worth Rs 300-400 crores.

Patanjali Ayurved opened a hospital "Patanjali Emergency & Critical Care Hospital" on 22nd January 2026 which was inaugurated by home minister of India Amit Shah.

In June 2025, Patanjali announced a mega food park project on 172.84 acres in Vizianagaram district. Andhra Pradesh Industrial Infrastructure Corporation (APIIC) had acquired ‘D' patta lands from farmers for the project.

In December 2025, Patanjali partnerred with Russian Government to promote health & wellness and tourism.

== Products ==
Patanjali Ayurved produces cosmetics and personal-care, ayurvedic and food products. The company opened Patanjali Paridhan, a clothing store in Delhi, in November 2018.

In May 2018, Patanjali launched Swadeshi Samriddhi SIM cards in partnership with BSNL.

== Revenue ==
Year	Revenue in crores
2010–11	₹1000
2011–12	₹300
2012–13	₹841
2013–14	₹1,184
2014–15	₹2,006
2015–16	₹8,000
2016–17	₹10,526
2017–18	₹9,500
2018–19	₹8,330

Future Group, which has joined with Patanjali, sells about ₹30 crore (US$3.2 million) worth of Patanjali products every month.

== Production ==
Patanjali Food and Herbal Park in Haridwar is the company's main production facility. With a production capacity of ₹35,000 crore (equivalent to ₹510 billion or US$5.5 billion in 2026), it is expanding to a capacity of ₹60,000 crore (equivalent to ₹940 billion or US$10 billion in 2026) through new production units in Noida, Nagpur, and Indore.

In 2016, the Patanjali Food and Herbal Park received 35 full-time, armed Central Industrial Security Force (CISF) commandos. The park will be the eighth private institute in India to be guarded by paramilitary CISF forces.

== Controversies ==
Patanjali Ayurved has had many cases filed against by the Government of Uttarakhand for various offences

In June 2025, The Nainital High Court has quashed the criminal case against Patanjali Ayurveda Limited and its founders Baba Ramdev and Acharya Balkrishna for publishing misleading advertisements.

Patanjali has been cited for its working conditions; Ramdev and Balkrishna are treated as gurus whose feet must be touched each time they enter an area. The average factory worker is paid ₹6,000 (US$64) per month for working 12-hour shifts, six days a week. They are also discouraged from asking for a raise, with the rationale that working at the factory is considered "seva" (voluntary service) to the cause and is a payment in itself.

On 22 May 2021, the Indian Medical Association (IMA) in Uttarakhand sent a defamation notice of ₹1,000 crore (equivalent to ₹12 billion or US$130 million in 2026) after remarks by Ramdev about doctors who practise evidence-based medicine. On 14 August 2025, Supreme Court, dismissed IMA's plea against Patanjali, upholds repeal of rule on AYUSH ads.

=== Infertility cure ===
One of the products manufactured by Ramdev's Divya pharmacy and sold by the Patanjali Pharmacy chain was Divya Putrajeevak Seed, described in its catalog as a natural herb which (according to the company) could treat infertility. However, doctors pointed out the misleading name of the drug: the word "putrajeevak" (lit. transl. "son's life" ). Some Patanjali Pharmacy stores allegedly sold the drug with the claim that it would ensure the birth of a boy.

The issue was raised in the Indian Parliament in July 2015 by opposition members who accused Ramdev of "peddling a product which promised delivery of male children." The Ministry of AYUSH (which oversees the sale of alternative medicines) defended the product's name, saying that it was named after a herb.

In 2016, the Uttarakhand health department said that the drug violated the Pre-Conception and Pre-Natal Diagnostic Techniques Act, 1994. The Maharashtra government ordered a probe of whether the drug had violated laws in 2018, and Congress leaders in the state demanded a ban on the drug.

=== Ganges pollution ===
In January 2018, villages in Haridwar district complained that Patanjali's Padarth factory was polluting a Ganges channel and other local rain-fed bodies of water with surface runoff; chemicals released by the factory reportedly killed several animals in the area. The local government took no action on the factory due to Ramdev's influence, and residents of 40 villages threatened agitation. The Uttarakhand Environment Conservation and Pollution Control Board ordered a clean-up of the waste flowing through the area. In the past, the board had notified Padarth about its release of untreated industrial effluent into local bodies of water. Patanjali's general manager denied the allegations, saying that the company followed established protocols.

=== Amla juice ===
The Ministry of Defence canteen stores department (CSD) suspended Patanjali Ayurved's amla juice after receiving an adverse state laboratory test report on the product; the central food laboratory found the juice unfit for consumption. The CSD asked its depots to make debit notes for their existing stock, so the product could be returned.

=== FSSAI notices ===
Patanjali introduced its instant noodles on 15 November 2015. The Food Safety and Standards Authority of India notified the company that neither Patanjali nor Aayush, the brand names for which Patanjali obtained licenses, received approval for the manufacture of instant noodles. In Rajasthan, mustard oil sold by Patanjali was found substandard by the FSSAI's Alwar laboratory.

=== Ayush Ministry against false advertisements ===
Ministry of AYUSH has advised certain states to take necessary action against Baba Ramdev's Patanjali Ayurved for illegally promoting products that claimed to cure diabetes, heart and liver diseases. The Ministry has specifically sought action against the advertisements of three Patanjali products — Lipidom, Livogrit and Livamrit.

=== Fake COVID-19 treatment ===
Patanjali Ayurved announced a drug named Coronil for COVID-19 treatment in June 2020, with Ramdev claiming that it cured the disease. There was no clinical data to prove that the new drug was effective or even safe; this prompted a social-media backlash which questioned the role of the Ministry of AYUSH. Within hours of Coronil's introduction, the ministry issued a statement denying authorisation for the new drug and asking the company to stop selling (and advertising) it until the trial results were examined by medical authorities. An official from the ayurved department of the government of Uttarakhand said that the approval application for Coronil had not mentioned COVID-19.

Laboratory tests showed that the drug did not contain any ingredients which could treat or prevent coronavirus infections. The Indian government allowed Patanjali Ayurved to market Coronil as an immunity booster (not a cure), but the Government of Maharashtra banned the sale of Coronil in the state. First information reports were filed in Bihar and Rajasthan against Ramdev, Balkrishna and others, accusing them of dishonesty and selling fake medicines. Patanjali responded to the accusations, saying that they did not violate any procedures before the drug was launched. A Madras High Court judge fined the company ₹1,000,000 (US$11,000) for making false claims about the drug, and Patanjali withdrew its claim that Coronil could cure COVID-19. The UK drug regulator threatened action if unauthorized products were sold in the UK.

The government of Maharashtra banned Coronil in the state in June 2020, with home minister Anil Deshmukh threatening the company with legal action if they did not observe the ban. The Madras High Court also barred Patanjali Ayurved from using the name "Coronil". The court's order came while it heard a suit filed by a Chennai-based firm which said that it had owned the trademark "Coronil" since 1993. Making an earlier interim injunction against Patanjali absolute, Madras High Court Justice C. V. Karthikeyan also imposed the fine on the company. In his ruling, the judge observed that Patanjali had been "chasing further profits by exploiting the fear and panic among the general public by projecting a cure for the coronavirus when their 'Coronil Tablet' is not a cure". Nepal and Bhutan halted the distribution of donated Coronil after orders from their governments to disclose that it was not a medicine to cure COVID-19.

==== False claims of government and WHO approvals ====
In February 2021, The Indian Express, The Times of India, The Hindu and Livemint reported Patanjali Ayurved's claim that Coronil had been approved by the Ministry of AYUSH and certified by the World Health Organization. The reports indicated that Ramdev had released studies showing that Coronil was effective against COVID-19 at a press conference attended by Union Health Minister Harsh Vardhan and transport minister Nitin Gadkari. In a News Nation interview, Ramdev accused doctors of "allopathic terrorism" for doubting Coronil's effectiveness. The claim was endorsed by Bharatiya Janata Party spokesperson Sanju Verma, who called it "... a huge endorsement for Ayurveda India's homegrown StartUp ecosystem that has flourished under @narendramodi govt." Verma described the approvals granted to Coronil as a "slap in the face" to the BJP's opposition.

On 22 February, the WHO said that it had not "... reviewed or certified the effectiveness of any traditional medicine for the treatment #Covid19." Several news and fact-checking outlets, including The Wire, Alt News, BBC News and The Economic Times, ran fact-checking articles debunking Ramdev and Patanjali's claims; Coronil had received an export license, and had not received any approval regarding its effectiveness as a treatment against COVID-19. Patanjali Ayurveda CEO Balkrishna admitted on Twitter that the approval for Coronil had not come from the WHO or the Ministry of AYUSH (as they had claimed), but had been granted by the Drugs Controller General of India for export – not as a certification of effectiveness.

In August 2022, Patanjali purchased of Dalits' lands for cow shelter and herb farms in Teliwala village, Uttarkhand.

=== Accusations of using fish bones in veg product ===
In May 2023, a Delhi-based law firm issued a legal notice to Patanjali Ayurved accusing the company of using 'cuttlefish bones' in dental care product, branding non-veg product as vegetarian in violation of the law.

=== Misleading advertising case ===
The company has been accused of misleading advertising about its products and flimsy testing before being marketed. Between April 2015 and July 2016, 33 complaints were received against 21 misleading advertisements; seventeen violated ASCI standards. In September 2017, the Delhi High Court ordered the company to stop airing an advertisement for its brand of chyavanprash which disparaged a competitor's. Company products, such as amla juice and ayurvedic medicines have been banned for poor quality.

Patanjali was sued by the Indian Medical Association in August 2022 for attacking allopathy to promote its medicines, violating DOMA and the Consumer Protection Act, 2019. The Supreme Court accused Patanjali of misleading marketing in November 2023 and threatened a Rs 1 crore per product fine for bogus promises.

In February 2024, the Supreme Court banned Patanjali's commercials and found Balkrishna in contempt. Patanjali was forced to apologize in newspapers by the Supreme Court. Patanjali apologized, but the court considered them insufficient. Patanjali issued more newspaper apologies per court ruling. The Uttarakhand Licensing Authority revoked 14 Patanjali product licenses after Supreme Court investigation of regulatory inaction.

In August 2024, the Supreme Court closed contempt proceedings against Patanjali Ayurved co-founders Baba Ramdev and Acharya Balkrishna, and their company in the misleading advertisements case, accepting the apology tendered by the parties after they took steps to rectify their mistake. The top court, however, warned that both Ramdev and Balkrishna should comply with all future orders and not repeat their past conduct.

== Sales and distribution ==
In May 2016, the company had nearly 4,700 retail outlets. Patanjali also sells its products online, and is planning to open outlets at railway stations and airports. The company joined Pittie Group and Kishore Biyani's Future Group on 9 October 2015, making its products available in Future Group outlets. Patanjali Ayurveda products are also available at Reliance Retail, Hyper City and Star Bazaar. The company had a target revenue of ₹10,000 crore (US$1.1 billion) revenue in 2016–17, after sales increased by 150 percent in the previous financial year to ₹5,000 crore (US$530 million).

Patanjali Ayurved's advertisement and sales promotion expenses in FY24 rose by 145.46% compared to FY23, increasing from Rs 173.13 crore to Rs 424.7 crore

== Acquisition ==
In December 2019, Patanjali reportedly acquired bankrupt Ruchi Soya Industries for ₹4,350 crore (US$460 million).

In March 2025, Patanjali Ayurved along with DS Group acquired Magma General Insurance for Rs 4,500 crore.

== See also ==
- FMCG in India
