= Aastha International =

Hindi-language television channel

- Country: United States, UK
- Broadcast area: Asia, Worldwide (World Direct, Zuku TV, MBC Digital Platform – TNT and Sky)
- Headquarters: Noida, India

Programming
- Language(s): Hindi
- Picture format: HDTV

Ownership
- Owner: Vaidanta Group Limited
- Sister channels: Aastha TV, Arihant TV, Aastha Bhajan

History
- Launched: 14 Jan 2009

Links
- Website: www.aasthatv.tv

Aastha International is a Hindi-language television channel, owned by Vaidanta Group. The channel is found across all major cable and DTH platforms of BSkyB in the United Kingdom. By 2006 it was reaching 160 countries around the world.
