= Rajiv Dixit =

Indian activist

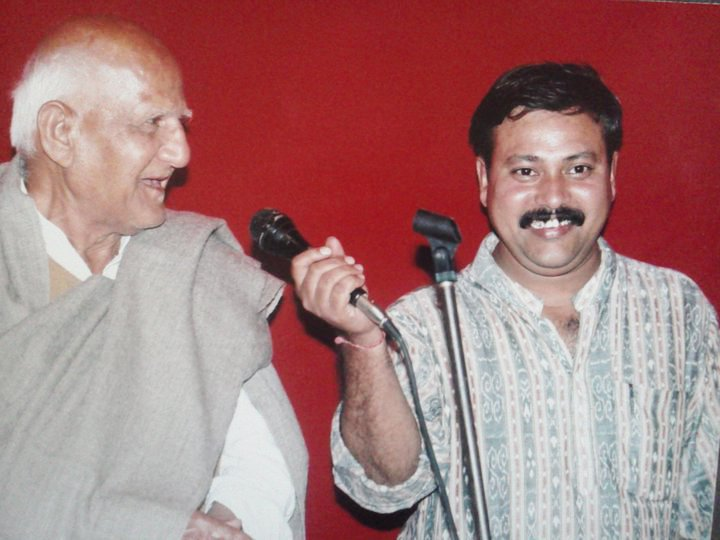
- Born: 30 November 1967; Aligarh district, Uttar Pradesh, India
- Died: 30 November 2010 (aged 43); Bhilai, Chhattisgarh, India
- Website: swdeshibharat.com

Rajiv Dixit (Note: Name sometimes spelled as Rajeev Dixit.) (30 November 1967 – 30 November 2010) was an Indian social activist who founded the Azadi Bachao Andolan. His organisation promoted a message of swadeshi-economics that opposed globalisation and neo-liberalism. In alliance with Ramdev, he formed the Bharat Swabhiman Andolan and its political offshoot, which combined the economic message with promotion of yoga and Ayurveda.

== Life and career ==
In 1984, the Bhopal disaster, in which a gas leak from a pesticide plant owned by a multinational corporation resulted in thousands of deaths, led Dixit to question the role of such corporations in the Indian economy. His thinking on the subject was subsequently shaped by Dharampal, a Gandhian historian and thinker. In 1992, Dixit founded the trust, Azadi Bachao Andolan (Save Independence Movement), with the stated mission to "counter the onslaught of foreign multinationals and the western culture on Indians, their values, and on the Indian economy in general". Dixit's message was spread through thousands of speeches delivered across the country and through recordings on CDs and tapes distributed by the organisation. In 2004, Dixit faced allegations that he had misappropriated funds from the Azadi Bachao Andolan to benefit his brother, and his relation with the organisation were estranged.

Also in 2004, Ramdev, who at that time was a traveling yoga teacher with a considerable following of his own, sought out Dixit and the two met in Nashik. Over the next few years Dixit became a mentor to Ramdev and their campaigns, against globalisation and for yoga respectively, merged. The two founded the Bharat Swabhiman Andolan (Indian Self-respect Movement), with Dixit serving as its national secretary. The new organisation had political ambitions. Prior to the 2009 Indian general election, it agitated alongside the Vishwa Hindu Parishad and allied Hindu organisations in a movement to clean the Ganga river, and in March 2010, the Bharat Swabhiman party was launched with an aim to contest the 2014 Indian general election. Dixit and Ramdev set out on a tour (Bharat Nirman yatra) across India to campaign for the party but Dixit died during a stop in Chhattisgarh, under murky circumstances.

Dixit's death, and the surrounding controversy, ended Bharat Swabhiman party's ambition to field electoral candidates.

== Ideology and activism ==
Dixit held that globalisation and economic liberalisation represented a new form of colonialism and blamed them for India's "dependency on the West, lack of domestic production, the rise of excessive consumerism, the weakening of the agrarian sector, and farmers’ suicides." He re-appropriated the term swadeshi for this message, thus linking it to the Swadeshi movement pioneered by Mahatma Gandhi during the Indian independence movement.

After the formation of the Bharat Swabhiman Andolan, the message of swadeshi economics was extended to include concerns about governmental corruption and economic inequalities, and interwoven with promotion of yoga and ayurveda.

In 2023, video emerged of a speech given several years earlier in which Dixit celebrated India's national anthem, Jana Gana Mana, repeating a controversial narrative of its creation as an homage to King-Emperor George V, and that the King-Emperor later awarded the Nobel Prize in Literature to its author, the poet and polymath Rabindranath Tagore. The claims were originally published in contemporary Anglo-Indian media when the song was first performed in 1911, and have been shown to be mistaken. Tagore himself denied that the song was a tribute to the British monarch, and George V was not chairman of the Swedish Academy in 1913 when Tagore was awarded the prize.

== Death ==
Dixit died on his 43rd birthday, on 30 November 2010, at a hospital in Bhilai, Chhattisgarh; the attending doctor declared the cause to be cardiac arrest. Dixit had been brought to the hospital after collapsing in a bathroom at an ashram in the nearby town of Bemetara. (Note: Some sources report, instead, that Dixit collapsed at the residence of a Bharat Swabhiman Andolan officer in Durg.) In later interviews, Ramdev said that Dixit refused to accept treatment despite the advice Ramdev gave him in an hour-long phone conversation that day; Dixit's family dispute that this happened. Dixit's body was flown to Haridwar and lay in a hall at Patanjali Yogpeeth as a large number of mourners gathered. The body was cremated the next morning on Ramdev's insistence, who overruled demands for a post-mortem by Dixit's family and colleagues. Suspicions regarding the cause of Dixit's death and Ramdev's involvement have persisted. In 2019, the Prime Ministers Office ordered a new inquiry into Dixit's death.

== See also ==
- Social reformers of India

== Sources ==
- Kanungo, Pralay (2019). "Gurus and the Hindu Nationalist Politics: The Baba Ramdev–BJP Partnership in the 2014 Elections". In Ahmad, Irfan; Kanungo, Pralay (eds.). The algebra of warfare-welfare: a long view of India's 2014 election. New Delhi, India: Oxford University Press. pp. 119–142. ISBN 978-0-19-948962-6.
- Pathak-Narain, Priyanka (2017). Godman to Tycoon: The Untold Story of Baba Ramdev. Juggernaut. ISBN 978-93-86228-38-3.
