= University of Patanjali =

Private University located in Haridwar, Uttarakhand

- Seal
- Type: Private
- Established: 2006; 20 years ago
- Affiliations: UGC, AICTE
- President: Swami Ramdev
- Vice-Chancellor: Acharya Balkrishna
- Visitor: Governor of Uttarakhand
- Location: Haridwar, Uttarakhand, India; 29.9085°N 77.9997°E
- Campus: 35 acres (14 ha); Urban
- Colours: Red and Yellow
- Website: www.universityofpatanjali.com

University of Patanjali is an Indian private research university, with its main campus in Haridwar, Uttarakhand. It was established in 2006 after the Legislative Assembly of Uttarakhand passed the University of Patanjali Act, 2006. It was founded by Baba Ramdev and Acharya Balkrishna.
