= Ramdev =

Indian yoga teacher and businessman

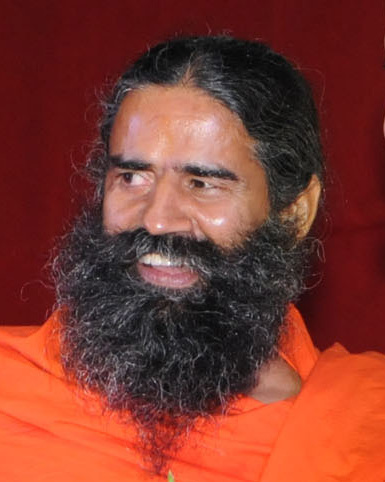
- Swami Ramdev c. 2016

Personal life
- Born: Ram Kisan Yadav (Note: The first name has been spelled Ram Kisan, Ramkishen, or Ramkrishna by various outlets.); 25 December 1965 (age 60) Mahendragarh, Haryana, India
- Other name: Baba Ramdev
- Occupation: Yoga teacher; businessman
- Website: www.swdeshibharat.com

Religious life
- Religion: Hinduism
- Founder of: Patanjali Ayurved; Patanjali Yogpeeth; Bharat Swabhiman Trust; Patanjali Foods

Ramdev (born Ram Kisan Yadav (Note: The first name has been spelled Ram Kisan, Ramkishen, or Ramkrishna by various outlets.) between 1965 and 1975), also known with the prefix Baba, is an Indian yoga guru and businessman. He is primarily known for being a proponent of yoga and ayurveda in India. Ramdev has been organizing and conducting large yoga camps since 2002 and broadcasting his yoga sessions on various Indian TV channels. He co-founded Patanjali Ayurved and Patanjali Yogpeeth with his colleague Balkrishna in 2006.

Ramdev is aligned with the Bharatiya Janata Party (BJP) on some issues. In 2011–2012, he led protests against corruption in India and advocated for the repatriation of black money held in foreign banks. Ramdev has received criticism over his comments related to modern medicine, yoga, and ayurveda.

In April 2022, The Indian Express listed Ramdev as the 78th most powerful Indian.

== Early life and education ==
Ramdev, originally named Ram Kisan Yadav, was born between 1965 and 1975 in a Haryanvi family in Alipur village of Mahendragarh district of Haryana. He was born to Ram Niwas and Gulabo Devi, who were illiterate farmers. He worked as a cowherd in his parents' fields. He has an older brother, a younger brother, and a younger sister. Since childhood, the left side of his face has been partly paralyzed, possibly due to a congenital disability. He has said to found relief from his paralytic condition through yoga.

Ramdev attended a government school at Shahbazpur, Haryana until the eight standard. After reading Dayananda Saraswati's Satyarth Prakash, Ramdev quit the government school where the curriculum according to the education policy introduced by British politician Babinton Macaulay. At around the age of nine, he studied at a gurukula system in Khanpur. Ramdev attended Arsh Gurukul Mahavidyalaya from 1984 to 1989.

At the age of fourteen, he moved to Kalwa to attend a gurukula and studied under one of his principal gurus, Acharya Baldevji. This is where he met Balkrishna as a fellow student. In Kalwa, he studied the Sanskrit language and literature, Hindu philosophical and religious texts, and traditions of yoga and asceticism. While living in Kalwa, he offered free yoga training to villagers.

After completing his studies in 1992, Ramdev traveled to Haridwar to stay at the Kripalu Bagh Ashram under the guidance of Shankardevi Maharaj. At Kripalu Bagh Ashram, he learned yoga from Acharya Karamveer, also an Arya Samaj. Ramdev took vows of renunciation, adopted sannyasa, and took the name Ramdev. Ramdev and Karamveer held yoga camps throughout India and sold chyavanprash in Haridwar together. During this time, Ramdev also spent time as a meditator in Gangotri.

On 5 January 1995, Balkrishna, Ramdev, and Acharya Karamveer founded Divya Yoga Mandir Trust, which was set up at the Kripalu Bagh Ashram in Haridwar. Under the Divya Yoga Mandir Trust, they offered yoga camps and established an Ayurvedic pharmacy.

== Yoga Camps ==
Baba Ramdev is widely recognised for his association with the promotion of yoga and Ayurveda in India and abroad. He organized and taught Large-scale yoga camps held across different parts of India became a key part of Baba Ramdev’s outreach, where he conducted sessions on yoga techniques and breathing exercises aimed at promoting physical and mental well-being. These camps drew significant public participation and contributed to the wider visibility of yoga among the general public.

His yoga sessions were aired on several Indian television channels, extending their reach beyond in-person gatherings. This broadcast presence enabled wider access to yoga practices for audiences across the country.

== Patanjali ==
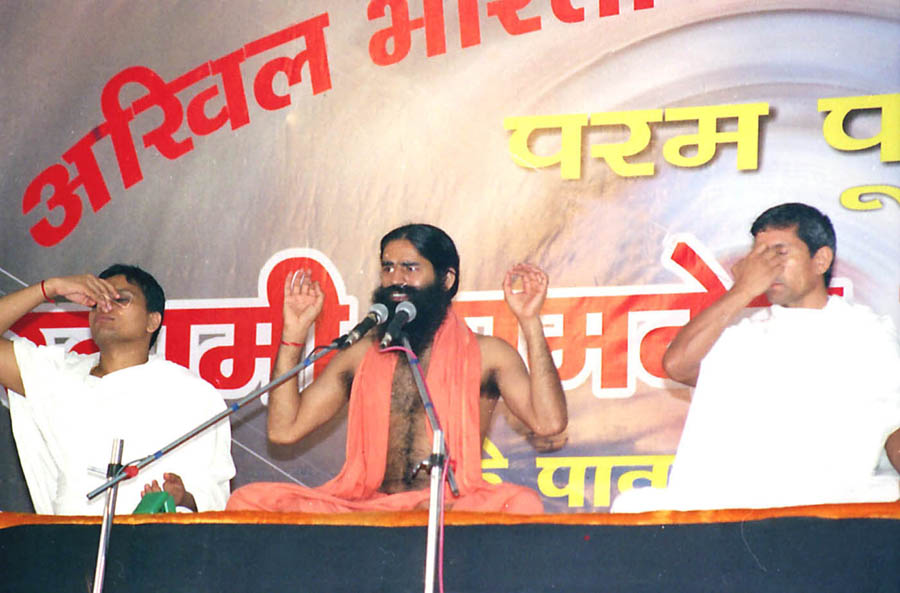
Ramdev giving yoga instructions in 2004

=== Patanjali ===
Ramdev started Patanjali Ayurved, a consumer packaged goods company, based in Haridwar, with Balkrishna in 2006. The company is one of the highest grossing FMCG firms in India. As a renunciate, Ramdev does not own shares. Balkrishna, the CEO of Patanjali Ayurved, has 96% ownership and supervises its day-to-day activities, while Ramdev serves as the face of the company and makes most of the business decisions. Ramdev and Balkrishna are treated like gurus and workers touch their feet as a sign of respect.

Members of Ramdev's family relocated to Haridwar and several have participated in his business ventures. His father has overseen some activities at Patanjali Ayurved. His younger brother Ram Bharat has been described as the company's de facto CEO.

Ramdev has advocated for Indian nationalism in the tradition of the swadeshi movement through the production and sale of Patanjali Ayurved products, and he has encouraged Indian citizens to reject multinational brands.

Ramdev declared net worth of his personal assets at around "₹1,100 crore" in 2013.

The company has been accused of creating misleading advertisements about its products and conducting insufficient testing before launching products in the marketplace.

In June 2020, Patanjali Ayurved announced a drug named Coronil for COVID-19 treatment, marketing it as a cure for COVID-19 patients. The day after the launch, a criminal complaint was filed against Ramdev and his partner, Balkrishna, in Muzaffarpur court by a social worker for misleading and putting the lives of a large number of people at risk. The Indian government allowed Patanjali Ayurved to market Coronil as an immunity booster but not a cure, banning it from selling as a COVID-19 cure. The Government of Maharashtra banned the sale of Coronil in the state, citing that the World Health Organisation had not certified the medicine. Lawsuits were filed in Bihar and Rajasthan against Ramdev, Balkrishna, and others, accusing them of cheating and selling fake medicines. The Madras High Court fined the company ₹10 lakh (equivalent to ₹13 lakh or US$14,000 in 2026) for "exploiting fear and panic among the general public by projecting a cure for the coronavirus." Patanjali withdrew the claim of Coronil being a cure for COVID-19. The UK drug regulator threatened action if the unauthorized products were sold in the UK market.

In November 2025, Baba Ramdev along with Patanjali Ayurved signed a MoU with Federal Government of Russia to promote health & wellness.

In June 2025, Baba Ramdev announced a mega food park project on 172.84 acres in Vizianagaram district. Andhra Pradesh Industrial Infrastructure Corporation (APIIC) had acquired ‘D' patta lands from farmers for the project.

=== Divya Pharmacy ===
In 1995, Ramdev along with his close associate Balkrishna started creating ayurvedic medicines under Ramdev's guru Swami Shanker Dev's Ashram. For the initial three years until 1998, they distributed medicines for free. Later in 2003 Ramdev made Balkrishna the head of Divya Pharmacy.

==== Labour law violations and animal contents ====
In March 2005, 115 employees of Divya Yoga Mandir Trust began a protest for minimum wages and employees' rights, such as coverage under the Provident Fund and Employees' State Insurance Corporation. Management agreed to pay minimum wage and not initiate disciplinary actions against the employees protesting and, in turn, the employees agreed that they would restore normalcy in the workplace. However, the Trust refused to take back some of the employees, accusing them of committing sabotage. Their case was taken up by the Centre of Indian Trade Unions CITU, affiliated with the Communist Party of India Marxist CPI(M).

Brinda Karat, a senior figure in the CPI(M), based on dismissed workers, alleged that some medicines sold by Divya Pharmacy included animal and human matter. The dismissed employees provided samples that were tested at government laboratories, where the presence of animal materials in the sample was confirmed. Karat produced what were claimed to be the prescription and cash receipts for the samples, which were obtained from the Trust's hospital medicine counter. Ramdev denied the results and said the samples could have been doctored. Further testing conflicted with the previous tests. He received support from politicians, such as Sharad Pawar. Karat received a legal notice on behalf of a BJP leader in Faridabad, ordering her to apologize publicly or face legal action.

=== Patanjali Yogpeeth ===
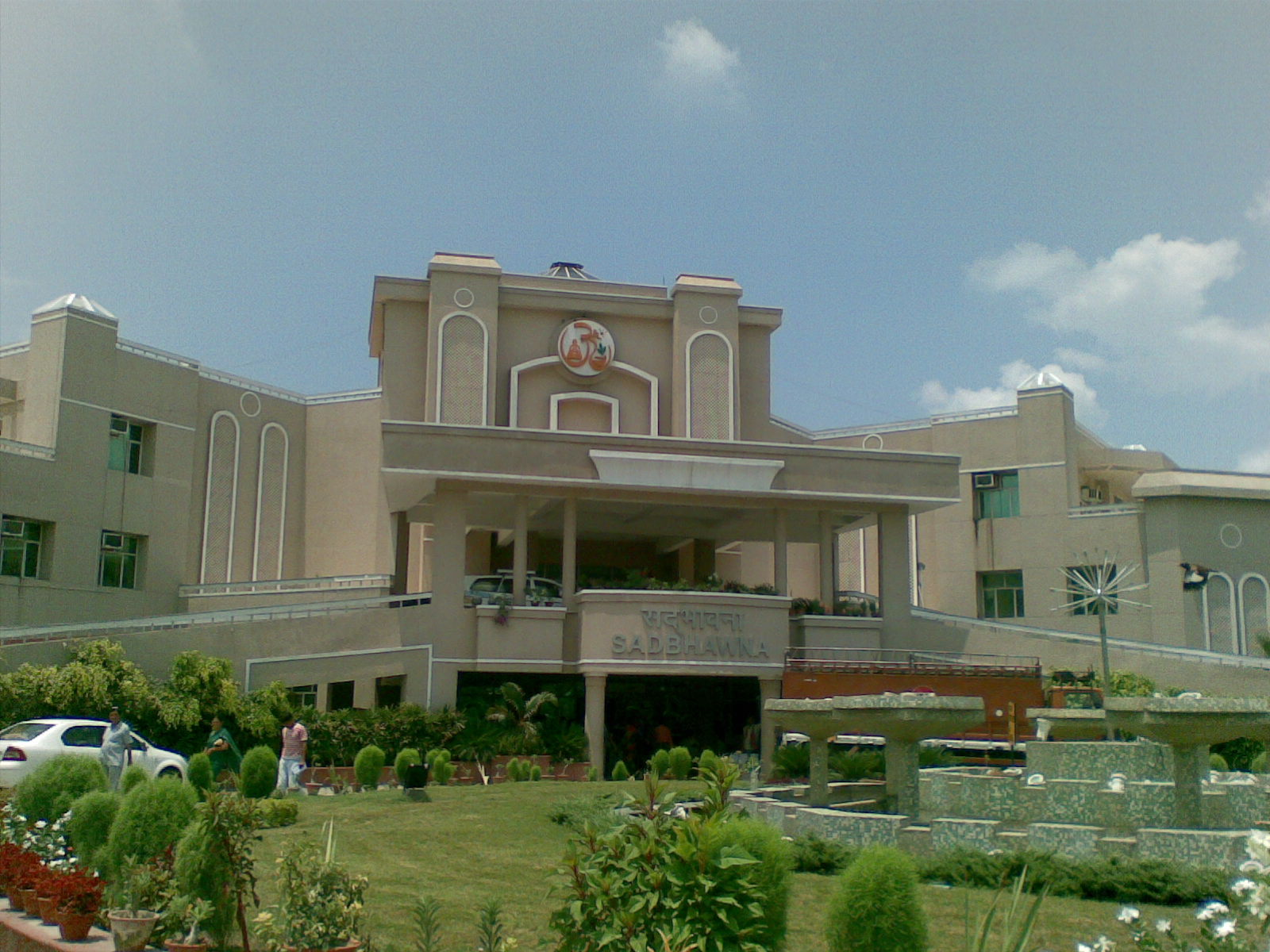
A view of Patanjali Yogpeeth in Haridwar

Patanjali Yogpeeth is an institute founded for the promotion and practice of Yoga and Ayurveda. It has two Indian campuses, Patanjali Yogpeeth I and Patanjali Yogpeeth II in Haridwar, Uttarakhand. Other locations include UK, US, Nepal, Canada and Mauritius. Ramdev is the Vice-Chancellor of the Patanjali Yogpeeth. In 2006, Ramdev established a registered charity in the UK known as the Patanjali Yog Peeth (UK) Trust, which had the stated objective of supporting Patanjali Yogpeeth (India) through the promotion of Ayurveda and pranayama yoga in the UK. To extend Patanjali Yogpeeth, he also acquired the Scottish island of Little Cumbrae. In 2012, Ramdev established the Divya Yog Pharmacy in Haridwar.

In 2017, the Income Tax Appellate Tribunal (ITAT) through its Delhi bench gave tax exempt status to Patanjali Yogpeeth.

In March 2018, 92 scholars of various different castes and backgrounds were initiated by Ramdev as sanyasis, or renunciants, at the Patanjali Yogpeeth in Haridwar. In 2022, Ramdev announced that sanyasis will serve as trustees of the Patanjali Yogpeeth and Divya Yoga Mandir. The sanyasis initiated by Ramdev studied Hindu scriptures for at least seven years at Patanjali Yogpeeth and a number of them have advanced degrees from universities.

In January 2026, Baba Ramdev announced to setup 2nd largest Yoga and wellness Center in Goa.

In January 2026, Ramdev through one of his company Patanjali Yogpeeth opened a hospital by the name of "Patanjali Emergency & Critical Care Hospital".

==== Patanjali Wellness ====
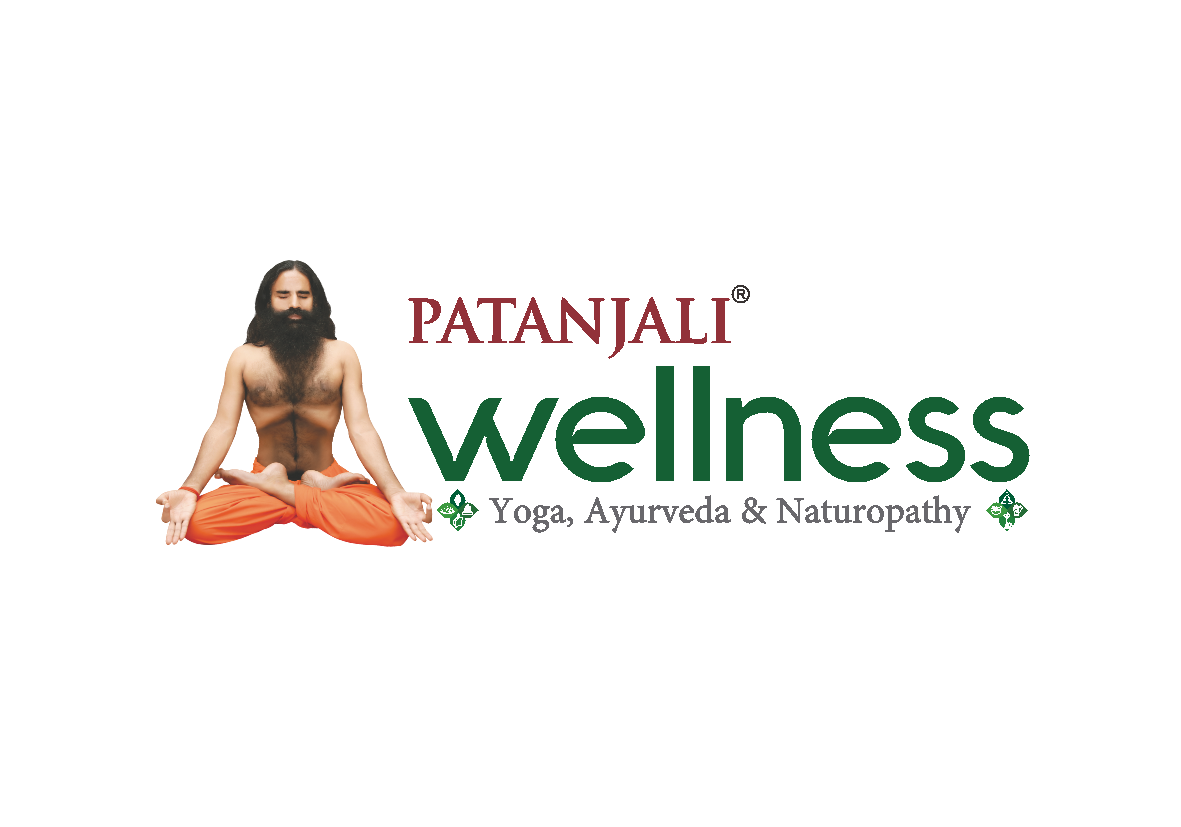
The Patanjali Wellness

The Patanjali Wellness is a chain of Ayurvedic Wellness Centres, established under Patanjali Yogpeeth, which was founded in 2006 in Haridwar, India.

In 2021, Swami Ramdev and Achrya Balkrishna started Patanjali Yogpeeth as part of the larger vision of Patanjali Group. Later in 2022, its name changed to "The Patanjali Wellness". In September 2022, it is announced that Patanjali Wellness IPO will be launched along with three other group companies.

In October 2024, Patanjali Wellness Centre opened integrated holistic healthcare services in Guwahati, Assam. Hubballi's Patanjali Wellness Center built by the MWB Group. In October 2024, Assam's first Patanjali Wellness Centre launched by Riniki Bhuyan Sarma. The Patanjali Wellness Centers were established in the Indian states of Uttarakhand, Delhi, Goa, Karnataka, Uttar Pradesh, Chhattisgarh and Assam.

The Patanjali Wellness operates under the guidance of Swami Ramdev, Acharya Balkrishna and Dr. G. Srinivas Gupta Garu. The mission of Patanjali Wellness is to advance holistic treatment by integrating Yoga, Naturopathy, Panchakarma treatments, Acupressure, and benign herbs or medicinal plants.

== Social and political activities ==
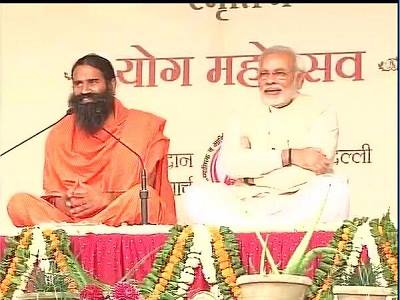
Ramdev at the Yog Mahotsav with Narendra Modi in Ramlila Maidan, New Delhi, 2014

=== Social engagement ===
In 2006, Ramdev was invited by Kofi Annan to deliver a lecture on poverty alleviation at a United Nations conference. In October 2014, he was one of the nine personalities invited by the Prime Minister Modi to participate and promote the message of cleanliness when Swachh Bharat Mission was launched.

In October 2025, Ramdev donated Rs. 1 crore for 2025 Punjab, India floods relief.

In January 2026, Union Home Minister Amit Shah along with Swami Ramdev inaugurated the Patanjali Emergency and Critical Care Hospital in Haridwar.

=== Bharat Swabhiman ===
In 2010, Ramdev announced plans to form a political party. In 2011, he stated that he did not have political ambitions, and instead of forming a political party, he would focus on fighting against nationwide corruption. In 2014, Ramdev announced that Bharat Swabhiman would contest some constituencies in the general election of that year and form alliances with some other parties. It was at this time that he voiced his support for Narendra Modi to become the next Prime Minister of India, and he signed nine pledges with BJP leaders on institutional and cultural reforms. The Gujarat High Court allowed the Trust to hold yoga camps in 2014 as long as the camps were not political in nature.

=== Campaigns against corruption ===
In April 2011, Ramdev called on the government to add punitive powers to the Jan Lokpal Bill, a bill to appoint an independent body to investigate alleged government corruption. Relatedly, Ramdev announced he would go on an anshan hunger strike at Ramlila Ground in Delhi, on 4 June 2011, to pressure the government to root out corruption and repatriate black money. A week before the scheduled fast, the government set up a committee, headed by the chairman of the Central Board of Direct Taxes, to suggest steps to curb black money and its transfer abroad. Talks continued between the two sides and, on 3 June, both sides claimed that a consensus had been reached on most issues. However, in the evening, Ramdev announced that he would still carry on with his hunger strike.

During the first day of the strike, government minister Kapil Sibal publicized a letter from Ramdev's camp stating that the hunger strike would end if the government honoured its commitments. Ramdev took it as a betrayal by the government and hardened his position.

Shortly before midnight on the first day, a Delhi police spokesman announced that permission for the gathering had been revoked because permission was only granted for a 5,000 person yoga camp, and not for a protest of 50,000 people. At midnight, over 5,000 police officers disrupted the protest and used Tear gas shells and a lathicharge to drive away protesters. Ramdev tried to escape capture by disguising himself in women's clothes but was eventually arrested and flown back to his ashram in Haridwar and banned from entering Delhi for 15 days. On reaching Haridwar, Ramdev told reporters that his fast was not over yet and he would continue with his satyagraha civil resistance.

Police reported that 53 citizens and ten police members were injured and treated in hospitals. There were accusations that women protesters had been badly treated by the police, who alleged that they had objects thrown at them by protesters. One female protester suffered a spinal injury and later died in a hospital from cardiac arrest. In a statement, Ramdev highlighted her sacrifice and noted that they would honor her by fighting against corruption in India.

==== Aftermath of the Delhi protest ====
Ramdev accused the government of cheating him, and alleged that there was a conspiracy to kill him. Leaders of the BJP said that the police action had been a shameful chapter in the democracy of this country. BJP leader LK. Advani called it naked fascism. India's Supreme Court asked the government for an explanation.

Ramdev was supported by civil society activists as well. Activist Anna Hazare called the crackdown a "strangulation of democracy". Hazare indicated that the action could have been compared to the Jallianwala Bagh massacre if the policed had fired ammunition. Thousands of supporters in other cities continued their fast in protest.

Ramdev ended his fast on the ninth day, after being hospitalised two days earlier. His decision to end the protest was welcomed by politicians from the BJP, Janata Party and Congress Party.

==== Ambedkar stadium fast movement ====
As a part of the "India against corruption" movement, Ramdev launched another indefinite protest on 10 August 2012 against the government's failure to act against corruption and repatriate money. He announced that his future strategy depended upon the government's response to his protest. Ramdev ended the fast at Delhi's Ambedkar Stadium on 14 August 2012, and announced he was returning to Haridwar. At Ambedkar, Ramdev said, "we are leaving because we won."

=== Television ===
Ramdev began appearing on TV as a yoga guru in 2002, first with Sanskar TV. The following year, in 2003, Aastha TV began featuring him in its morning yoga slot. He proved to be telegenic and gained a large following. A large number of people, including some celebrities from India and abroad, attended his Yoga camps. He taught students in foreign countries including the United Kingdom, the United States, and Japan. He also addressed Muslim clerics at their seminary in Deoband, Uttar Pradesh in 2009. At Yog Gram, his main yoga centre, Ramdev practices and teaches yoga in an auditorium, for TV broadcast. In 2017, he was also a judge of a reality show entitled, "Om Shanti Om", where contestants sang devotional songs.

== Public statements ==
=== Rajiv Dixit ===
Rajiv Dixit, Ramdev's advisor, died of a cardiac arrest on 30 November 2010 in Bhilai, Chhattisgarh. A few of Ramdev's friends believe that he may have been involved in Dixit's death, however, he has denied any involvement.

=== Homosexuality ===
In 2013, the Supreme Court of India upheld the constitutionality of Section 377, which in part criminalized homosexuality. Ramdev approved, saying homosexuality is a disease which needs to be cured.

=== Medicine ===
==== COVID-19 ====
Ramdev sparked several controversies related to diagnosing and curing COVID-19 at the beginning of the pandemic. He claimed that holding one's breath could help one diagnose the virus, and further claimed that mustard oil could treat the virus, both of which lacked scientific basis. In May 2021, he questioned the need for oxygen amongst COVID-19 patients, but later withdrew his remarks after facing criticism from doctors. But the back-handed apology did not last long as he again took a swipe at allopathy in an open letter, asking "If allopathy is so efficient, why do allopathic doctors fall ill and does allopathy have any medicine to ensure transition of a violent man into a decent one". Dr Jaswant of the Resident Doctors Association at AIIMS told that the "language of (Ramdev's) letter is not an apology". Indian Medical Association's (IMA) national vice-president, Dr. Navjot Singh Dahiya, filed a police complaint against Ramdev for allegedly creating the wrong perception about treatments and for allegedly using defamatory and insulting language towards doctors.

On 18 August 2022, Delhi High Court told Baba Ramdev not to mislead people against modern medicine after questioning the efficacy of COVID-19 vaccines and to avoid making any claims other than what is deemed official about Patanjali's Coronil.

In December 2025, Baba Ramdev withdrew his plea in the Supreme Court to club FIRs over anti-allopathy remarks during the COVID-19 pandemic.

==== Comments against modern medicine ====
In late May 2021, Ramdev sparked a controversy when he claimed that modern medical science is a "stupid science" and that patients have died due to it. As a result, the IMA claimed that he was creating fear and frustration among the public to sell his drugs. The IMA also demanded the Union Health Minister Harsh Vardhan take action against Ramdev and prosecute him under the Epidemic Diseases Act, 1897 to save lives. The Delhi Medical Association demanded an FIR against him. Later, Patanjali's Balkrishna clarified that Ramdev has "no ill-will against modern science and good practitioners of modern medicine". After facing pressure from the Health Minister, Ramdev eventually withdrew his comments and issued an apology.

Following the withdrawal, he posted 25 questions to IMA in an 'open letter' regarding treatments for several diseases. He courted sharp criticism from the medical community when he claimed that, "[d]octors should not fall ill at all if allopathy is all powerful and 'sarvagun sampanna' (having all good qualities)". IMA's Uttarakhand division sent a defamation notice to Ramdev and expressed that they would demand ₹1,000 crore (equivalent to ₹12 billion or US$130 million in 2026) if he didn't issue an apology. In a new video, he was seen reacting to the demand by saying, "even their father cannot arrest him".

On 3 June 2021, the Delhi High Court refused to issue an injunction against Ramdev, noting that his comments fall under the right to freedom of speech and expression. In February 2024, the Supreme Court issued a contempt notice against him after he continued advertising misleading claims for Patanjali products despite assurances to the contrary in the court.

=== Religion ===
In March 2017, Ramdev said at an event in Rohtak that he would have beheaded people who refused to chant Bharat Mata Ki Jai if there was no law, but backtracked his statement a month later.

In February 2023, Ramdev said Muslims think offering prayers legitimize terrorism and abducting Hindu girls.

Ramdev was criticised by the Delhi High Court for his "sharbat jihad" remarks targeting Hamdard's 'Rooh Afza'." In May 2025, Delhi High Court closed the case against Rooh Afza after Ramdev pledged to delete the advertisements.

== Awards and recognitions ==
- January 2007 – Honorary Doctorate, by Kalinga Institute of Industrial Technology, Bhubaneswar, in recognition of his efforts to popularise the Vedic system/science of Yoga.
- July 2007 – Legislature of the U.S. State of New Jersey honored Ramdev for his commitment to improving health in mind, body and spirit and to enhancing the well-being of people from all social backgrounds.
- July 2007 – Some members of the British House of Commons hosted a reception for him.
- September 2007 – Felicitated by KL. Chugh, Chairman of ASSOCHAM at the 5th Global Knowledge Millennium Summit.
- January 2009 – Conferred with the title Mahamahopadhyaya by Rashtriya Sanskrit Vidyapeetha, Tirupati, Andhra Pradesh.
- January 2011 – Honoured with Sri Chandrashekharendra Saraswati National Eminence Award by Maharashtra Governor K. Shankaranarayanan.
- July 2012 – Honoured with Tarun Kranti Award at Ahmedabad in National Icon category by Narendra Modi, the current Prime Minister of India. The award is constituted by eminent Digambara Jain monk Tarunsagar.
- January 2015 – Considered for Padma Vibushan, second highest civilian award but day before 66th Republic day, refrained from taking noting he is an ascetic.
- April 2015 – Government of Haryana appointed Ramdev as brand ambassador of Yoga and Ayurveda. He was given the status of Cabinet minister for Haryana but he declined.
- May 2016 American business magazine Fast Company ranked Ramdev 27th in its Most Creative Business People of 2016 list.
- April 2017 – Magazine India Today ranked Ramdev #5th in India's 50 Most powerful people of 2017 list.
- April 2022 – The Indian Express ranked Ramdev 78th in the list of 100 Most Powerful Indians in 2022 (IE 100).
- Baba Ramdev felicitated with ZEE Samvad Real Heroes 2026 award. The award was presented by Ashish Kumar Chauhan, MD & CEO, National Stock Exchange.

== Publications ==
1. Ramdev, Swami (2009). Prāṇāyāma Rahasya: Secrets of Prāṇāyāma, with Scientific Factual Evidence. Diamond Pocket Books (P) Ltd. ISBN 978-81-89235-01-7.
2. Ramdev, Swami (1 March 2006). Yog Its Philosophy & Practice. Diamond Pocket Books (P) Ltd. ISBN 978-81-89235-15-4.
3. Ramdev, Swami (2005). Aushadh Darshan. Diamond Pocket Books (P) Ltd. ISBN 978-81-89235-24-6.
4. Ramdev, Swami (2004). Vitality Strengthening Astavarga Plants (Jeevaniya & Vayasthapan Paudhe). Divya Yog Mandir Trust. ISBN 978-81-89235-03-1.

== In popular culture ==
Patanajali Ayurveda Limited remains one of the top ten advertisers in India, and Ramdev's face has become ubiquitous. He is one of the most visible celebrities in India, appearing on his own television channel and other talk shows, interviews, and news reports. His show is called "Om Yog Sadhana," estimated to have eighty-five million followers.

=== AI-Generated Deepfakes ===
On 26 February 2026, Delhi High Court has ordered to stop the unauthorised use Baba Ramdev's name, image, and voice across all formats and platforms, including content created using artificial intelligence and deepfake technology.

== Notes ==
Ramdev spoke at TV9 Network's WITT 2026 summit in March, advocating Ayurveda and digital detox."Baba Ramdev at WITT 2026". News9live. 24 March 2026.
