= Workplace Religious Freedom Act =

2005 law in the United States

The Workplace Religious Freedom Act (WRFA) is a proposed amendment to title VII of the Civil Rights Act of 1964, which would limit employers' discretion to decline to accommodate the religious practices of their employees or prospective employees in the United States. WRFA would amend that part of title VII which is codified at 42 U.S.C. 2000e(j).

== Context ==
In its current form (as of 2013), 42 U.S.C. 2000e(j) forbids discrimination on the basis of religion, including "all aspects of religious observance and practice, as well as belief, unless an employer demonstrates that he is unable to reasonably accommodate to an employee's or prospective employee's religious observance or practice without undue hardship on the conduct of the employer's business." The 2013 version of WRFA would delete the phrase "he is unable", and substitute for it: "the employer is unable, after initiating and engaging in an affirmative and bona fide effort."

== Content of the proposal ==
Under WRFA, an employer would be required to make a "bona fide effort" to accommodate each religious practice or observance, and would be relieved of this duty only if the employer could prove that the effort resulted in "undue hardship". WRFA would also add an additional provision, to be codified at 42 U.S.C. 2000e(j)(2), further limiting employers' ability to deny accommodations with respect to "the practice of wearing religious clothing or a religious hairstyle, or of taking time off for a religious reason." In such cases, the employer's proposed choice of accommodation would not be considered reasonable (or lawful) "unless the accommodation removes the conflict between employment requirements and the religious practice of the employee." In order to refuse accommodation to these categories of religious practices, an employer would be required to meet a stringent definition of undue hardship by showing that "the accommodation imposes a significant difficulty or expense on the conduct of the employer's business." With these provisions, WRFA expressly attempts to supersede the Supreme Court's decision in Trans World Airlines, Inc. v. Hardison, 432 U.S. 63 (1977) (see Section 2, "Findings," para. 3). In that case, the Supreme Court held that an employer could deny an employee’s request for religious accommodation based on any burden greater than a de minimis burden on the employer.

== Introductions ==
WRFA was first introduced in the House of Representatives in 1994 by Jerrold Nadler (D-NY). As originally introduced, the proposed 42 U.S.C. 2000e(j)(2) would not have been limited to religious clothing, hairstyle and holiday observances. The bill was introduced in the Senate in 1999, by Senator John Kerry (D-MA), and again in 2002. Senator Rick Santorum (R-PA) introduced the bill again in 2003. In 2005, WFRA was once again introduced in the Senate by Senators Santorum and Kerry, and in the House of Representatives by Representatives Mark Souder (R-IN), Carolyn McCarthy (D-NY), Bobby Jindal (R-LA), and Anthony Weiner (D-NY). Other supporters of the bill included Senator Hillary Clinton (D-NY) and Senator Ted Kennedy (D-MA). The bill did not pass either house. In 2010, the Act was reintroduced in the Senate as the Workplace Religious Freedom Act of 2010 (S. 4046). In 2012, the Act was again reintroduced in the Senate as the Workplace Religious Freedom Act of 2013 (S. 3686). In each case, the Act's sponsor was Senator John Kerry (D-MA). In its various incarnations, the scope of WRFA was narrowed to encompass religious dress, grooming, and holidays. Although WRFA has consistently had supporters in both parties, it has yet to pass.

== Reception ==
=== Support ===
This legislation has garnered the diverse support of various religious groups including, the Union of Orthodox Jewish Congregations, the Southern Baptist Convention, the National Council of Churches, the North American Council for Muslim Women, the Sikh American Legal Defense and Education Fund, the Seventh-day Adventist Church, the Jewish Council for Public Affairs, the Council on American Islamic Relations, B'nai B'rith International, the American Jewish Committee, Agudath Israel of America, the U.S. Conference of Catholic Bishops and other groups.

=== Opposition ===
When first introduced, WRFA was opposed by the ACLU. The ACLU considered the bill "poorly-written" and argued that it could legalize certain acts of discrimination in the name of religion. The ACLU was also concerned that other employees might be forced to carry additional workloads to accommodate the religious practices of co-workers, and that the secular nature of the workplace would be eroded. They and the U.S. Chamber of Commerce and several other business organizations opposed it as placing undue legal burdens on employers. When the scope of the provision which would create 42 U.S.C. 2000e(j)(2) was narrowed, supporters of the bill claimed that the ACLU dropped its opposition, although the ACLU itself declined comment. Michael J. Eastman, executive director of labor law policy for the U.S. Chamber of Commerce, said of the revised bill, "We are not in the habit of supporting bills that make it easier to sue our members."

== See also ==
- Workplace spirituality
