= Sanskar TV =

Indian spiritual television channel

Sanskar TV संस्कार
- Logo of Sanskar TV

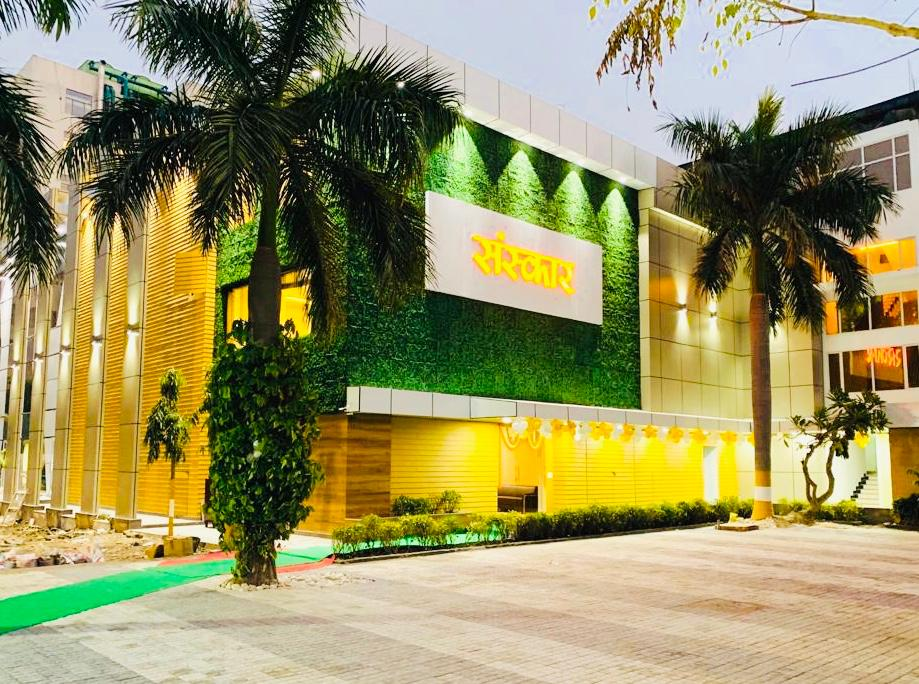
- Sanskar TV, FC 16, Sector 16 A. Film City, Noida 201301. Uttar Pradesh. India
- Type: Television Channel
- Country: India
- Broadcast area: India; United Kingdom; Europe; United States; Nepal
- Network: Sanskar Info TV Private Ltd
- Headquarters: Noida, Uttar Pradesh, India

Programming
- Picture format: DVB

Ownership
- Owner: Sanskar Info TV Private Ltd
- Key people: Manoj Tyagi (CEO)
- Sister channels: Satsang TV; Shubh TV; Sanskar USA; Sanskar UK; Sanskar Nepal

History
- Launched: June 2000; 26 years ago

Links
- Website: Sanskargroup.in

Availability

Streaming media
- YouTube: Official Channel

Sanskar TV is an Indian spiritual Television channel, based in Noida, India. Its programs feature to broadcasting on the Indian philosophy, religion, spiritual solidarity, and culture and focuses more on devotion than spiritualism. The channel started broadcasting in June 2000 and in 2004 The Tribune reported it to have been gaining popularity over the then dominated entertainment and news channels on Indian television.

Through various spiritual discourse programmes the channel also focuses on younger generation. Discourses are given by various notable spiritual gurus like Sri Sri Ravi Shankar, Swami Ramdev, Jagadguru Kripalu Maharaj, Ramesh Oza, Swami Avdheshanand Giri and Morari Bapu. The shows include bhajans, kirtans and broadcasts from various pilgrimage places.

== History ==
Sanskar TV was launched in India in June 2000 and in the year 2010 the channel started broadcasting in the USA on DISH USA platform #721. In March 2018 Sanskar TV was made available to the viewers in the United Kingdom and Europe through the SKY platform #725.

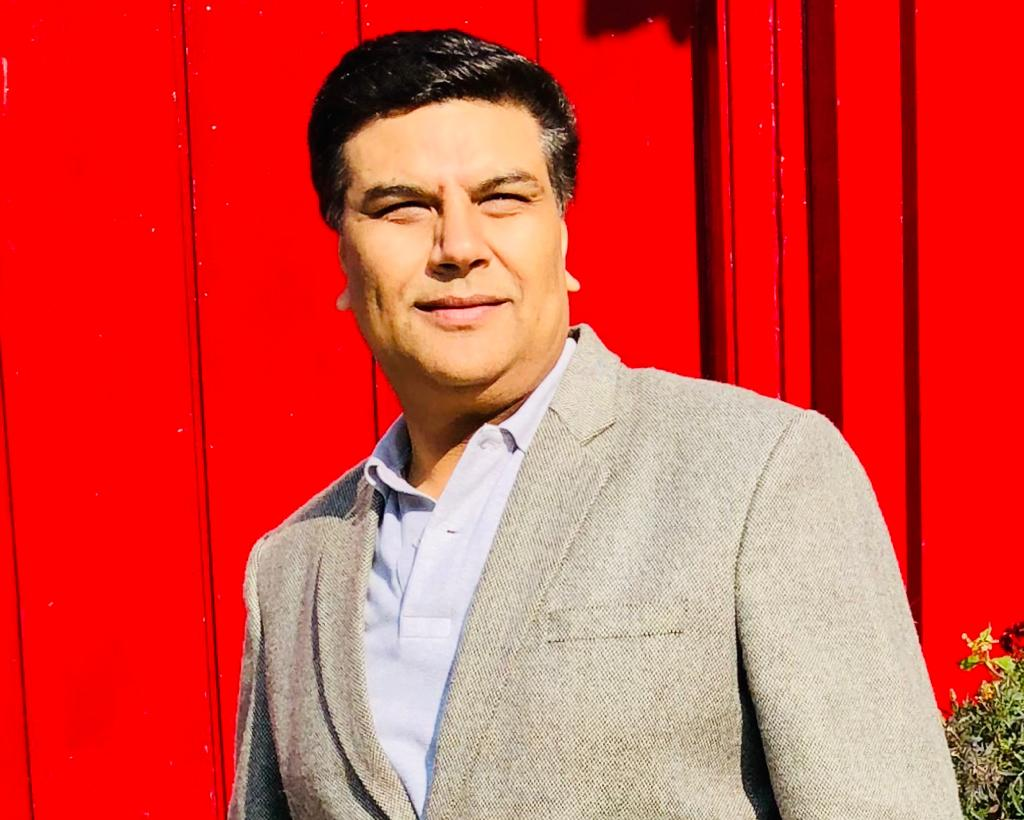
Manoj Tyagi, CEO, Sanskar TV Group

In 2016, Swami Ramdev and Acharya Balkrishna appointed Manoj Tyagi to head the Sales and marketing team of Sanskar TV and Satsang TV but soon in early 2017 he was elevated to the post of the CEO of Sanskar TV group. On 19 March 2018, Sanskar TV UK was launched on Sky platform for the viewers of Indian devotional content based in the United kingdom and Europe under the leadership of Manoj Tyagi.

== Awards and recognition ==
- The United Kingdom-based World Book of Records (WBR) felicitated Sankar TV channel for doing pioneering work in the field of spreading the ideas of sanatan dharm globally. The award was handed over by WBR CEO to Sanskar TV CEO Manoj Tyagi on April 29, 2022
- 'Antarrashtriya Yoga Diwas Media Samman' (2019) for "Best Media Coverage of Yoga in Television" conferred to Sanskar TV on January 7, 2020, by the then Information and Broadcasting Minister Prakash Javadekar.
