= Khanpur Khurd =

- Village
- Location in Haryana, India Khanpur Khurd (India)
- Coordinates: 28.46°N 76.3323°E
- Country: India
- State: Haryana
- District: Jhajjar
- Established: 15 July 1997

Government
  - Type: Panchayat raj
  - Body: Panchyat
- Elevation: 220 m (720 ft)

Population (2011)
  - Total: 7,644

Languages
  - Official: Hindi, Haryanvi language
- Time zone: UTC+5:30 (IST)
- 124103: 124142
- Telephon code: 91-1251
- ISO 3166 code: IN-HR
- Vehicle registration: HR-14 (private vehicle) HR- 63 (Commercial veh.)
- Website: haryana.gov.in

Khanpur Khurd, is a village, which is the location of Indira Gandhi Super Thermal Power Project, in Matanhail tehsil of Jhajjar District in the state of Haryana in India.

== Geography ==
It belongs to Rohtak Division. It is located 33 km west of Jhajjar, 18 km from Matanhail and 298 km from State capital Chandigarh. The village is rather closer to Charkhi Dadri than Jhajjar city to on the border of the Jhajjar District and Bhiwani District.

It lies south of Indira Gandhi Super Thermal Power Project, Khanpur Kalan lies to west of Khanpur Khurd. Other nearby villages are Khorra to north-west, Bahu to south-west, Jholri to south, Goria to south-east.

== Demography ==
Total population of Khanpur Khurd as per 2011 census is approximately 7644 with 726 families, with 81.06% literacy, 86.91% and 65.66% male and female literacy respectively.

== Language ==
The language spoken is haryanvi.

== Administration ==
The village has its own panchayat under panchayat raj.

== Economy ==
Village economy is agriculture based and it is also the location of Indira Gandhi Super Thermal Power Project which lies between Khanur Khurd, Khanpur Kalan and Jharli.

== See also ==
- Dhillon
- Indira Gandhi Super Thermal Power Project
