= Balkrishna =

Indian businessman, Scholar of Ayurveda

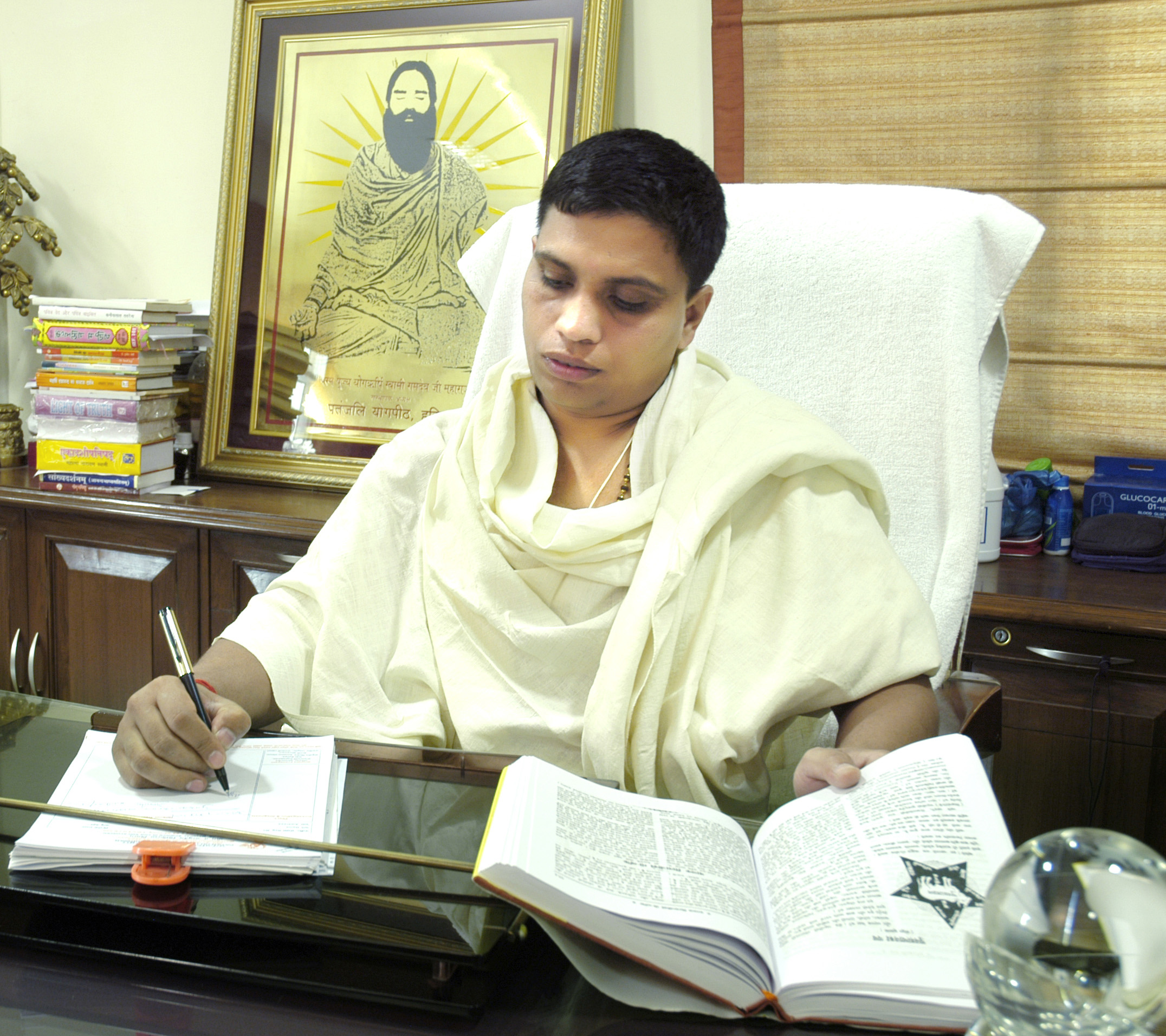
- Born: 4 August 1972 (age 54); Haridwar, Uttarakhand, India
- Occupations: Ayurvedacharya, businessman
- Known for: Patanjali Ayurved
- Title: MD/CEO, Patanjali Ayurved
- Website: acharyabalkrishna.com

Balkrishna (born 4 August 1972) is a Sanskrit scholar, Ayurveda researcher, author, co-founder & managing director of the Patanjali Ayurved, Patanjali Foods and Patanjali Yogpeeth. He was reported by Forbes to have a net worth of US$2.3 billion as of May 2021. It was then updated to US$3.6 billion in 2025.

== Early life ==
Balkrishna was born on 4 August 1972 in Haridwar, Uttarakhand (then Uttar Pradesh), to Nepalese immigrants, Sumitra Devi and Jay Vallabh Subedi originating from Nepal. He spent his childhood in Nepal. He returned to India and studied at Khanpur Gurukul in Haryana, where he met Ramdev.

== Career ==
On 5 January 1995, Balkrishna, Ramdev, and Acharya Karamveer founded Divya Yoga Mandir Trust which was set up at the Kripalu Bagh Ashram in Haridwar. This was followed in 2005 by the establishment of the Patanjali Yogpeeth Trust, which was given responsibility in 2022 for the establishment and management of the Bharatiya Shiksha Board. In 2006, they founded Patanjali Ayurved, a fast-moving consumer goods (FMCG) company involved in the manufacturing and trading of FMCG, herbal, and ayurvedic products. Followers of Ramdev, NRIs Sunita and Sarwan Poddar, helped kick-start the business with a loan. According to Balkrishna, he had taken out a ₹50–600 million loan at a time when he had never held a personal bank account in his name. In 2012, the company posted a turnover of ₹4.5 billion (US$47 million) which by 2015–2016 had risen to ₹50 billion (US$520 million). Patanjali Ayurved's revenue from operations increased marginally to ₹9,022.71 crore in the year up to 31 March 2020. Revenue stood at about ₹8,522.68 crore in FY19.

While Ramdev does not hold a stake in Patanjali Ayurved, he is the face of the firm and endorses its products to his followers across his yoga camps and television programmes. Balkrishna owns 94% of the company and serves as its managing director. He is a close aide of Ramdev. Acharya Balkrishna listed in India's 50 most influential personalities 2020. He was reported India's third-youngest billionaire by Forbes India Rich List 2020. He is also second billionaire of Nepalese origin.

In 2025, Acharya Balkrishna founded Patanjali Organic Research Institute in order to promote organic farming India.

Acharya Balkrishna, on August 4, 2025, launched Saumitreya Padpaniruktam at Patanjali Wellness. This book has taken references from more than 150 ayurvedic manuscripts. During the launch of Saumitreya Padpaniruktam, 11 other books were also launched.

In September 2025, Acharya Balkrishna named in Stanford’s top 2% scientists worldwide.

In January 2026, Balkrishna along with his partner Ramdev started a hospital which will be overseen by Patanjali Yogpeeth by the name of "Patanjali Emergency & Critical Care hospital". Home minister of India, Amit Shah inaugurated the hospital.

In June 2026, Acharya Balkrishna on behalf of Patanjali Yogpeeth signed a MoU with Indonesia's only Hindu University "Universitas Hindu Negeri" for building academic and research bridges between the two countries.

== Public Image ==
For the past several days, people had been using deepfake content to tarnish Balakrishna's image. Balakrishna filed a plea regarding this in the Delhi High Court, and in March 2026, the Delhi High Court issued strict orders to immediately remove the deepfake content from the internet.

== Book Release ==
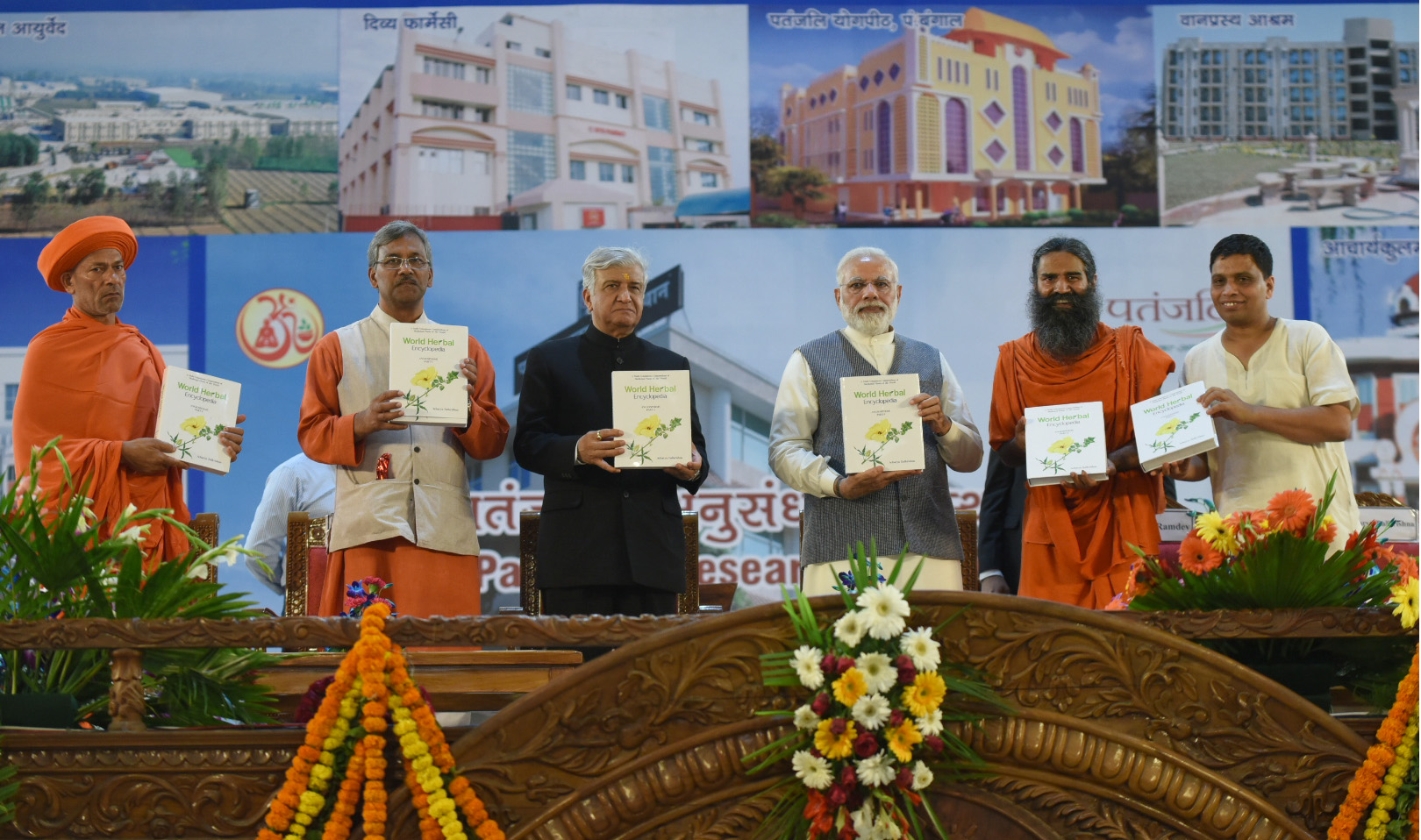
The Prime Minister of India, Shri Narendra Modi released the World Herbal Encyclopedia, Vol. 01, in Haridwar, Uttarakhand in 2017

In 2017, the Prime Minister of India, Shri Narendra Modi released Balkrishna's book the World Herbal Encyclopedia, Vol. 01, in Haridwar, Uttarakhand.

== Personal life ==
Balkrishna lives in Haridwar, Uttarakhand, and is unmarried.

== Positions ==
- Patanjali University, Haridwar – Vice Chancellor
- Divya Yog Mandir (Trust), Haridwar – General Secretary
- Patanjali Yogpeeth (Trust), Haridwar – General Secretary
- Patanjali Research Foundation – General Secretary
- Patanjali Gramodhyog Trust – General Secretary
- Patanjali Foods- Chairman
- Patanjali Ayurved Limited, Haridwar – Chairman & Managing Director
- Yog Sandesh - Chief editor
- Vedic Broadcasting Ltd.– Managing Director
- Patanjali Food and Herbal Park, Padartha, Haridwar – Managing Director
- Bhartiya Shiksha Board, General Secretary

== Awards ==
- Acharya Balkrishna honoured with Peacemaker health award 2026 at the Billionaires for Peace Conclave 2026 held in Mumbai on May 21, 2026
- In February 2026, Acharya Balkrishna was honoured with the SFE Outstanding National Ethno-Pharmacologist Award.
- Honorary Doctor of Literature degree by the Governor for the protection of Ayurveda and Indian knowledge tradition at the 10th convocation ceremony, Uttarakhand Sanskrit University.
- Champions of Change award in 2019, for his work in the field of Ayurveda.
- "UNSDG 10 Most Influential People in Healthcare Award", for his work in the healthcare sector.
- "Best Wellness Impact Global Award" from the CFI.co.
- "Bheeshma Puraskar" by Sant Shree Gyaneshwar Gurukul, Pune.
- AIMA Managing India Award 2018 for the "Transformational Business Leader of the Year" by Central Minister Rajyavardhan Singh Rathore.
- "Shalin Manav Ratna Award – 2018" By Anoopam Mission for his contribution towards social welfare and Ayurveda.
- "Degree of Doctor of letter (Yoga) (Honoris Causa)" by S-Vyasa Deemed University Swami Vivekananda Yoga Anusandhana Samsthana for outstanding work done in the field of Yoga and Ayurveda.
- "Indian of the Year Business Category – 2017" for his contribution to the country to strengthen the foundation of society and helping in building Brand India in the process; by CNN-News on 30 November 2017
- "Jashn-e-Youngistan Samman for Business Icon of the Year" by News 24.
- "Lokmanya Tilak Award 2017" by Tilak Smarak Trust on 1 August 2017 for his contribution towards the promotion of Yoga & Ayurveda
- "Bloomberg Special Recognition Award" by the India Brand Equity Foundation on 22 March 2016 for outstanding contribution in the field of Ayurveda.
- "Bharat Gaurav" award by Kaptan Singh Solanki, Governor of Haryana and Punjab in recognition of his amazing work in the field of Ayurveda at a programme organised by the Indian International Friendship Society at New Delhi in 2016.

== Literary career ==
Acharya Balkrishna has published more than 330 research articles in various national and international journals and has authored more than 200 books on yoga and Ayurveda and edited many unpublished ancient Ayurveda manuscripts.

=== Notable publications ===
- World Herbal Encyclopedia (111 Volumes)
- Flora of Rashtrapati Bhavan
- Medicinal Plants of Rashtrapati Bhavan
- Flora of Sijusa-Arunachal Pradesh
- Man Ke Manke Part-2
- World Botanical Part-6
- Ayurveda Siddhanta Rahasya
- Ayurveda Jadi-Buti Rahasya
- Bhojan Kutuhalam
- Ayurveda Mahodadhi
- Vichar Kranti
- Acharya, Balkrishna (2010). Vedic Nityakram Vidhi. Divya Prakashan. ISBN 978-81-89235-55-0.
- Acharya, Balkrishna (2009). Syllabus of Yoga/Yog Siksha ka Pathyakram. Divya Prakashan. ISBN 978-93-85721-60-1.
- Acharya, Balkrishna (2004). Divya Aushadiya Avam Saundriyakaran. Divya Prakashan. ISBN 978-81-89235-05-5.
- Effect of a yoga practice session and a yoga theory session on state anxiety; 2009; Shirley Telles, Vaishali Gaur, Acharya Balkrishna; Citations: 81

=== Notable books ===
- 'Secrets of Indian Herbs for Good Health', March 2008, Divya Prakashan, p;422, ISBN 8189235648
- 'Jadi Buti Rahasya', 2014, Divya Prakashan, ASIN:B0826SPYTD
- 'Ayurved Siddhanth Rahasya', Divya Prakashan, 1 January 2013, p:300, ISBN 8189235478
- 'Ayurved Jadi Buti Rahasya', p:420, ISBN 4049800357
- 'Upchar Paddhati', p:252, ASIN:B09Y6D6B43
- 'Hansraj-Nidanam', p:297, Divya Prakashan, ISBN 978-93-88508-57-5
- "Harmekhala", 1 January 2015, p:615, Divya Prakashan, ISBN 978-93-85721-01-4
- "Grow with Yoga", 28 May 2018, p:128, National Book Trust India, Divya Prakashan ISBN 978-81-237-9763-2
- "Hridaya Deepak Nighantu", 1 April 2016, Divya Prakashan, p:221, ISBN 93-85721-10-0
- "Grihastha Yog Sadhak Ke Gun", 1 April 2017, p:68, ISBN 93-85721-09-7
