= Yog Sandesh =

Indian monthly magazine

Yog Sandesh is a monthly magazine published in India.

== History and profile ==
The Yog Sandesh was first published in September 2003. The magazine is published by the Divya Yog Mandir Trust. It covers yoga, pranayama, ayurveda, culture, rituals and spirituality. The magazine published in only two languages, including Hindi and English, . It has a monthly readership of more than a million in India and abroad. This magazine is inspired by Baba Ramdev and the editor of this magazine is Acharya Balkrishna.
