= Patanjali Yogpeeth =

Indian yoga institute

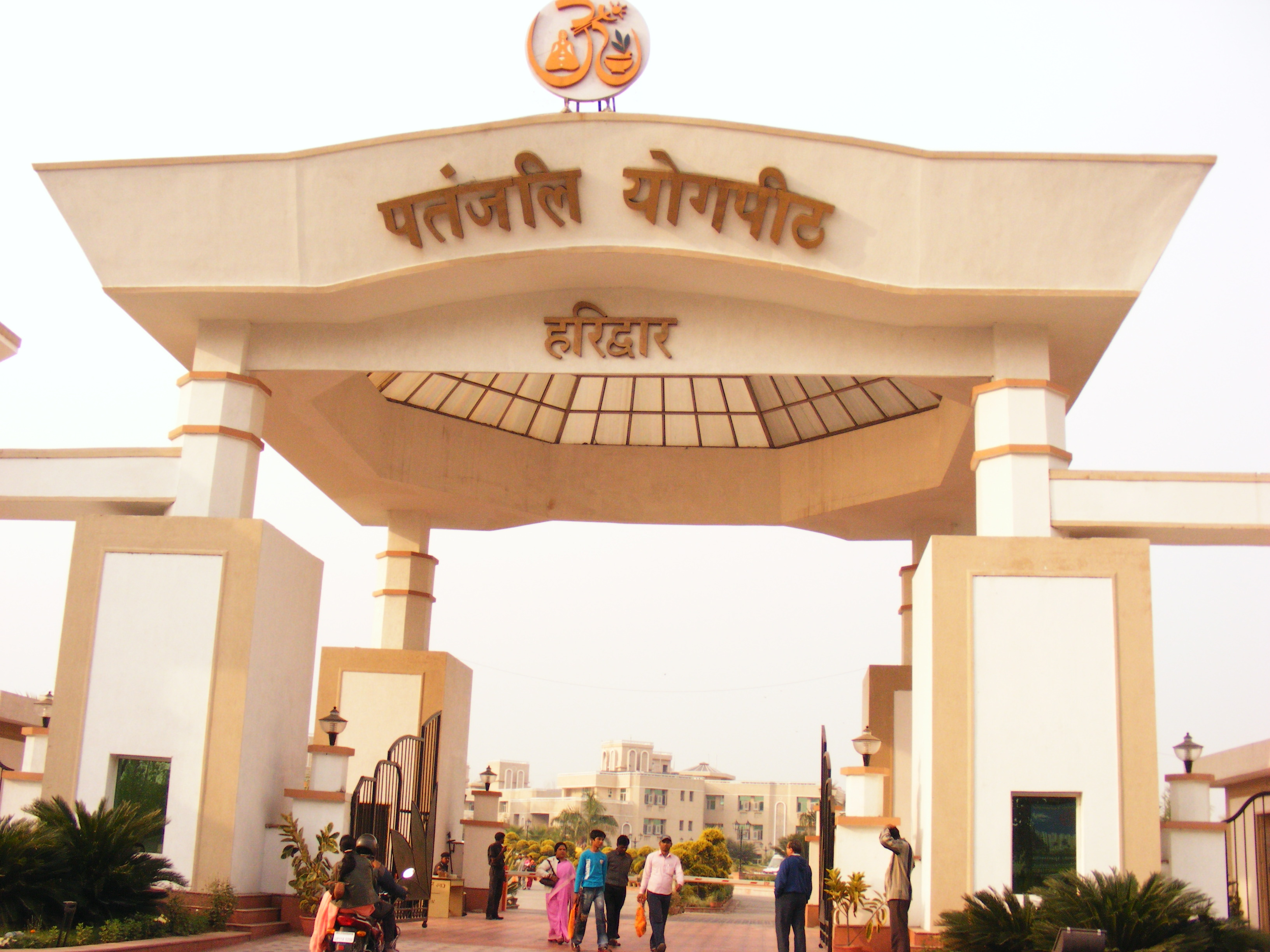
- Entrance to Patanjali Yogpeeth
- Founders: Ramdev, Balkrishna
- Established: 2006
- Focus: Yoga, Ayurveda
- Chair: Balkrishna
- Key people: Ramdev, Balkrishna
- Owner: Divya Yoga Mandir Trust (Balkrishna)
- Location: Haridwar, Uttarakhand, India
- Website: Divya Yog Mandir (Trust)

Patanjali Yogpeeth is a yoga institute located in Haridwar, Uttarakhand, India. Founded in 2006 and named after the Rishi Patanjali, the purpose of the institute is to practice, research, and develop yoga and ayurveda. The institute is the flagship project of the yoga teacher and entrepreneur Ramdev.

The Patanjali Yogpeeth houses a hospital, pharmacy and several Patanjali trusts. It is also the home of the University of Patanjali and the Yog Gram ashram. Balkrishna is the General Secretary of Patanjali Yogpeeth. Ramdev is the Vice-Chancellor of the Patanjali Yogapeeth.

In 2017, the Income Tax Appellate Tribunal (ITAT) gave tax exempt status to Patanjali Yogpeeth through its Delhi bench. Located on the Haridwar-Delhi highway, the institute offers treatments for all and has residential accommodations. It is about 20 km (12 mi) from Haridwar at Kankhal and about 15 km (9.3 mi) from Roorkee.

== Patanjali Yogpeeth Trust ==
Patanjali Yogpeeth Trust, a non-profit organisation started by Ramdev, aims to carry out welfare activities in the spheres of health care, education and other socio-economic activities. Patanjali drives its social responsibility initiatives through the Patanjali Yogpeeth Trust.

== University of Patanjali ==
University of Patanjali
- Type: Private
- Established: 2006
- Location: Haridwar, Uttarakhand, India
- Website: Official website

University of Patanjali is located in Haridwar, Uttarakhand. It was established in 2006. The university is also engaged in state-of-the-art Ayurvedic research. The research fields are a combination of Yoga, Ayurvedic medicine, and other ancient Indian medicinal resources. As in April 2024, the university has over 1,500 students.

Patanjali Yogpeeth comprises two campuses, named Patanjali Yogpeeth - I and Patanjali Yogpeeth - II respectively.

=== Patanjali Yogpeeth - I ===
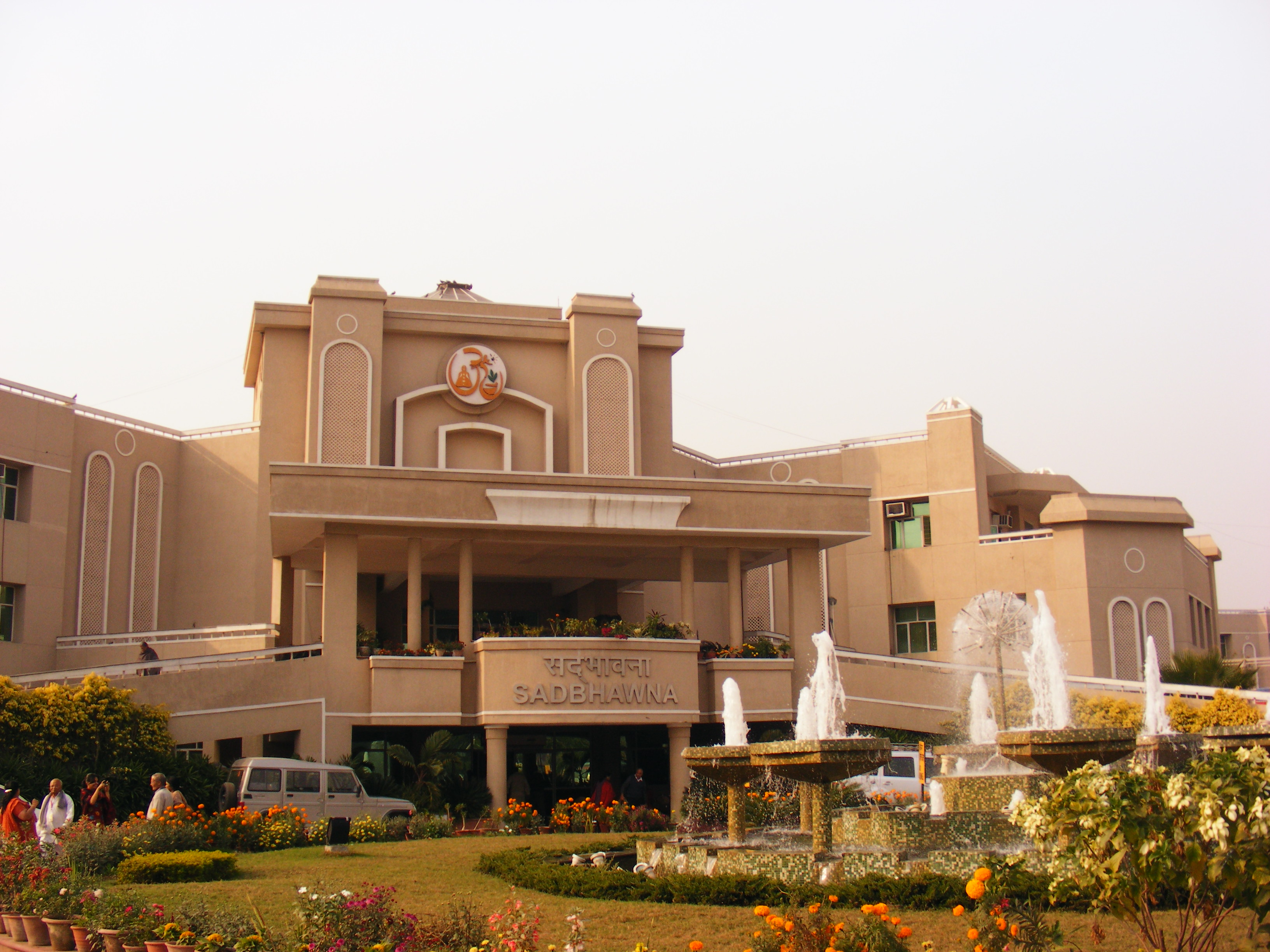
Patanjali Yogpeeth I, Main Building (Sadbhawana)

This first Yogpeeth campus was commissioned on 6 April 2006.

- In 2010, the Patanjali Ayurveda College study and research facility was commissioned as part of the university. The campus library has a special area dedicated to the research of yoga and ayurveda. Various ancient books are being restored and digitized.

=== Patanjali Yogpeeth - II ===
This second Yogpeeth campus was inaugurated in April 2009.

- Patanjali Yog Bhavan is a huge auditorium of 200,000 sq. ft. where thousands of participants practice yoga, pranayama and meditation together.
- Shraddhalayam is a 60,000 sq. ft. air conditioned auditorium.
- Patanjali Wellness is a 40,000 sq. ft. centre where up to about 1,000 people can perform and participate in natural wellness treatments based on Yoga, Ayurveda, and Naturopathy, including but not limited to diet therapy, physiotherapy, panchakarma, and shatkarma therapies.

== Acharyakulam ==
Acharyakulam
- Haridwar; Uttarakhand; India

Information
- Type: Private
- Motto: ||सा प्रथमा संस्कृतिर्विश्ववारा|| (Sa Prathama Sanskritirvishwawara) (The foremost culture of the world, enriched by only time!)
- Established: 2013
- School board: CBSE
- Chairperson: Acharya Balkrishna
- Principal: Aradhana Kaul
- Staff: 120
- Grades: V to XII
- Language: English
- Campus type: Residential
- Website: acharyakulam.org

Acharyakulam is a school based on Vedic-cum-modern education near Patanjali Yogpeeth, Haridwar. It is a residential educational institution for students from grades 5th to 12th. It was inaugurated on 26 April 2013 by Narendra Modi, the then Chief Minister of Gujarat. It is affiliated to Central Board of Secondary Education (CBSE).

Ramdev's main aim behind opening Acharyakulam was to promote Vedic education and Indian culture. He believed establishing Acharyaklam will help to protect the culture of India and promote Vedic knowledge to new generations of Indians. In 2014, Ramdev proposed to the central government to have a new educational board that would collate insights from ancient Gurukul system and modern sciences, and bring uniformity in education dispersed at other such schools including Vidya Bharti Schools and Gurukuls run by RSS and Arya Samaj.

=== Admission ===
The admissions examination happens in December. The examination happens for the fifth class. The selected students are tested again for a week in Acharyakulam. 80 boys and 40 girls are admitted to continue education until the 12th standard.

Ramdev plans to establish 600 schools in 600 districts across the country. Apart from Indian culture, Sanskrit and Yoga, it will also provide education in modern science. In 2018 Ayush Sharma and Yuvraj Aaditya Arya received overall 99% and 98% respectively in class 10 CBSE Board exams.

On 27 September 2018, Amit Shah, Trivendra Singh Rawat and Ramdev inaugurated new premises of Acharyakulam near Patanjali Yogpeeth Phase-1.

== Yog Gram ==
Yog Gram is an ashram run by Patanjali Yogpeeth. A natural health center that was built in 2009 at the ashram suffered a fire in 2020. It maintains a natural environment. It provides physical, mental and spiritual health treatments through the integrated therapy of Ayurveda.

The concept of Yog Gram is from Ramdev and his associate Balkrishna. It was inaugurated by former Chief Minister of Uttarakhand B. C. Khanduri on 8 June 2008. In 2015, expansion work began in Tirupati. In 2019, Yog Gram expanded to serve 600 patients from 300.

Yog Gram was described as Adarsh village, with the following facilities.

- Naturopathy
- Yoga
- Meditation
- Panchkarma
- Shatkarma
- Gaushala (Cowshed)

== Controversies ==
=== Ramdev's comments against modern medicine ===
In May 2021, Ramdev sparked controversy when he spoke against modern medical science in the context of COVID-19 pandemic in India. The Indian Medical Association (IMA) objected to his comments. On 22 May, the IMA's Uttarakhand division sent a defamation notice of ₹1,000 crore (equivalent to ₹11 billion or US$120 million in 2023). On 27 May, Patanjali Yogpeeth confirmed that it had received the defamation notice from IMA demanding an apology from Ramdev over his remarks. In a statement, the institute quoting Balkrishna said it would give a befitting reply legally to IMA. The institute claimed that all of its activities are carried out with scientific and truthful temperament. It said it "cannot allow anyone to disparage, neglect and demean the great knowledge and science of rishis and scriptures".

=== 2023-24 Supreme Court Case ===
Indian Medical Association (IMA) filed a lawsuit against Patanjali Yogapeeth claiming Patanjali was falsely advertising that their products and treatments cured diseases without proofs for the same. The Supreme Court of India took a strong stance against Patanjali Ayurved and its co-founders, Baba Ramdev and Acharya Balkrishna, for their ongoing issuance of misleading advertisements. These ads claimed that certain Patanjali products could cure diseases like diabetes and asthma. The court rejected their apologies, deeming them insufficient and mere "lip service", and noted a blatant disregard for prior judicial directives meant to curb such misleading practices.

The court has explicitly banned Patanjali from advertising any products as treatments for specific diseases, reinforcing the prohibition under the Drugs and Magic Remedies (Objectionable Advertisements) Act, 1954.

== Sources ==
- Telles et al. (2013): "Patanjali Yogpeeth, Haridwar: An Ayurveda center which includes treatment, research, and education", J Ayurveda Integr Med 2013 Apr-Jun; 4(2): 120–122.
