= Sukhabodhananda =

Indian motivational speaker

Swami Sukhabodhananda is a guru from the Bangalore area of India. He was the only spiritual leader representing Hinduism at the 2005 World Economic Forum in Davos, Switzerland.

== Biography ==
Sukhabodhananda was born in 1955 in Bengaluru. He followed the teachings of Chinmayananda Saraswati.

== Works ==
- Cukapōtān̲antā; Śaṅkarācārya (2011). Adi Shankaracharya's Bhaja Govindam (in Sanskrit and English). Ahmedabad: Jaico Pub. House. ISBN 978-81-8495-206-3.
- Cukapōtān̲antā (1997). Manase Relax Please – Part I. (in Tamil). Chennai: Vikatan Publications. ISBN 978-8189780609.
- Cukapōtān̲antā (2003). Manase Relax Please – Part II (in Tamil). Chennai: Vikatan Publications. ISBN 978-8189780456.
- Cukapōtān̲antā (2002). Oh, mind relax please: roots of yoga, wings of management. Bangalore, India: Prasanna Trust. OCLC 634652744.
- Cukapōtān̲antā (2005). Meditation: the ultimate flowering (in Sanskrit and English) (7th ed.). Bangalore, India: Prasanna Trust. OCLC 631660141.
- Cukapōtān̲antā (2003). Looking at life differently: minimising tensions, maximising effectiveness (2nd ed.). Bangalore, India: Prasanna Trust. ISBN 978-81-901496-8-6.
- WorldCat link to further books in Indian languages.
