= Patanjali Foods =

Indian multinational food and beverage company

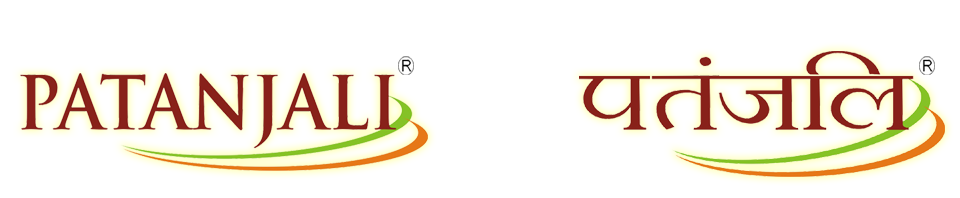
- Type: Public
- Traded as: BSE: 500368; NSE: PATANJALI
- ISIN: INE619A01035
- Industry: Food processing
- Founded: 1986; 40 years ago
- Headquarters: Indore, Madhya Pradesh, India
- Area served: Worldwide
- Products: Biscuits; Cookie; Wheat flour
- Revenue: ▲₹31,916 crore (US$3.4 billion) (FY24)
- Operating income: ▼₹1,482 crore (US$160 million) (FY24)
- Net income: ▲₹1,060 crore (US$110 million) (FY24)
- Parent: Patanjali Ayurved
- Website: www.patanjalifoods.com

Patanjali Foods, formerly known as Ruchi Soya Industries Ltd, is an Indian multinational fast-moving consumer goods company specialized in the food industry, part of the Patanjali Ayurved. It is headquartered in Indore, India.

Patanjali Foods is a listed company on Bombay Stock Exchange and National Stock Exchange with ticker symbol "PATANJALI".

== History ==
Ruchi Soya Industries Limited was founded in 1986 by Dinesh Sahara, to manufacture soybean edible oil.

In January 2010, the company acquired a 50 percent stake in Gemini Edibles and Fats India for ₹45 crore, until the whole company was purchased by the Widjaja family of Indonesia in 2014.

In December 2017, Ruchi Soya Industries entered into insolvency with a total debt of about ₹12,000 crore. In December 2019, Patanjali Ayurved acquired the bankrupt Ruchi Soya for ₹4,350 crore.

In June 2021, Ruchi Soya acquired the biscuits and noodles business of Patanjali Ayurved for ₹60 crore. It acquired the food business of Patanjali Ayurved for around ₹690 crore in May 2022. Ruchi Soya changed its name to Patanjali Foods in June 2022.

In 2023, SEBI froze promoters shares for failing to allow the minimum public shareholding in listed companies at 25%.

In 2025, a prohibition order on the sale of Patanjali Organic Wild Honey was revoked.

In September 2025, Patanjali Foods signed a MoU with Ministry of Food Processing Industries, Government of India and announced ₹1000 crore investment in food processing across Uttarakhand, Uttar Pradesh, Madhya Pradesh, Maharashtra, Karnataka and Odisha.

In November 2025, Patanjali Foods collaborated with Indian Council of Agricultural Research for scientific innovation, quality planting material, and enhanced support for citrus growers.
