= Italian language in Canada =

The Italian language in Canada has been widespread since the 19th century, particularly due to Italian emigration. According to the 2021 Census of Canada, 1,546,390 Canadians (4.3% of the total population) claimed full or partial Italian ancestry, and Italian is the ninth most widely spoken language in Canada with 547,655 speakers, including 319,505 mother tongue speakers. Italian is also being learned as a foreign language in Canada by 37,375 students as of 2019.

== History of Italian immigration to Canada ==
Immediately after the unification of Italy, it experienced the phenomenon of emigration on a massive scale. While until that time the migratory destinations had been mostly European, starting in the second half of the 19th century transatlantic emigration to the Americas emerged, in the direction of lands that became typical destinations for Italians. The first immigrants, most of whom came from Basilicata, Sicily, Apulia, Piedmont, Lazio, Abruzzo and Molise, settled in Canadian lands in isolation; they were mostly single men who had left their country of origin due to population growth, lack of work and high taxation, intending to return soon.

By the 1880s Canada was a booming country in need of major infrastructure works that could improve transportation and communication between the vast areas of its territory. Dating back to these years was the construction of major railroad and canal sections that generated a growing demand for labour. The number of Italians moved to Canada for the construction of the Canadian railway, the Canadian Pacific Railway, in the 1881 census amounted to 1,849 citizens. Around the turn of the century, there was a further growth in the number of Italians in Canada, with a change in the migratory flows, consisting not only of adult men between the ages of twenty and forty-five, but also of women and children. From 1900 to 1913, although in smaller numbers than in the United States, Brazil and Argentina, Canada welcomed about 60,000 Italians, mostly from the south (Calabria, Abruzzo, Molise and Campania) and the northeast (Veneto and Friuli-Venezia Giulia) who went to settle not only in the industrial hubs in Ontario, Toronto and Ottawa, but also in small towns. Among them, the following cities have a significant presence of the Italian community even today: Hamilton, Guelph, Windsor and Thunder Bay.

These years also saw the birth of the so-called Little Italies, neighbourhoods with a strong Italian presence. Within these cities there was a move away from the typical occupations required of Italians, namely those of labourer and factory worker: Italians had the opportunity to open small businesses and practice the trades that had been learned in their countries of origin. Many of them became barbers, shoe repairers, grocers, fruit vendors and bakers. These stores thus began to characterize the appearance of Italian neighbourhoods. There soon developed what is called a "migratory chain,"(MacDonald and MacDonald, 1964) that is, emigrants who arrived in the great oceanic country generally went to form homogeneous aggregates according to the geographical area of origin, creating a network of solidarity and economic, linguistic and social support. Thus migrants from the same region, and often even the same municipality, went to live in the same cities, the same neighbourhoods, even the same streets. Migrants learned about opportunities, methods of travel, obtained employment and housing through social relations with those in the land of destination.

The migration "boom" from Italy to Canada occurred from the end of World War II and involved to a greater extent those from Lazio, Abruzzo, Friuli, Veneto, Campania, Calabria and Sicily. There were also numerous Italians from Istria and Dalmatia who emigrated to Canada as a result of the Julian-Dalmatian exodus (also known as the Istrian exodus). Between the early 1950s and the mid-1960s, approximately 20,000 to 30,000 Italians immigrated to Canada each year, surpassing those who went to the United States during the same period. In the late 1960s, the Italian economy experienced a period of growth and recovery, removing one of the primary incentives for emigration. 90 percent of the Italians who immigrated to Canada after World War II remained in Canada, and decades after that period, the community still had fluency in the Italian language.

In 2019, Canada received the 11th highest number of Italian emigrants, and among non-European countries was the fourth highest after Brazil, the United States and Australia. Compared to the past, the skills of migrants have changed as today there are many researchers, skilled workers and entrepreneurs. In 2018, more than half of the Italian citizens who moved abroad (53 percent) had medium-high educational qualifications: 33,000 high school graduates and 29,000 college graduates. Highly qualified people are in demand in Canada in areas that are lacking in the territory, particularly in information and communication technologies.

Italian immigrant population in Canada
Year	Population	% of immigrants in Canada	% of Canadian population
1986	366,820	9.4%	1.5%
1991	351,615	8.1%	1.3%
1996	332,110	6.7%	1.2%
2001	315,455	5.8%	1.1%
2006	296,850	4.8%	0.9%
2011	260,250	3.6%	0.8%
2016	236,635	3.1%	0.7%
2021	204,070	2.4%	0.6%

Italian citizens residing abroad in Canada (AIRE)
Year	Population	% of total immigrants abroad in Canada
2012	137,045	3.1%
2016	141,203	2.8%
2017	140,633	2.7%
2022	142,996	2.4%

== Use of the language ==
In 1991, Italian was the unofficial language with the most mother tongue speakers at 449,660, ahead of German and Chinese. As of the 2021 Canadian census, of the 1,546,390 Italian Canadians, 319,505 claim Italian as their mother tongue. Italian is the ninth most widely spoken language in Canada with 547,655 speakers. There has been an overall decline in the use of the Italian language since 2001.

As of the 2021 census, the majority of Italian mother tongue speakers live in the Greater Toronto Area (125,895; 39.4%) or the Greater Montreal Area (87,565; 27.4%).

Data from 2011 on the use of Italian by young Italian-Montrealese in the family context report that "38% of them speak Italian, solely or in combination with other languages, in interactions with their mothers and 34 percent in interactions with their fathers, while if only Italian is considered, these percentages drop to three percent with their mothers and seven percent with their fathers." The percentages of Italian-only use go up in interaction with grandparents: 60 percent of young people speak only Italian with their grandmother and 58 percent speak only Italian with their grandfather.

According to Bruno Villata, Italian:

- is used mostly in the family sphere or in communication with friends;
- is spoken mostly by older people;
- is no longer employed to transmit knowledge;
- enjoys little prestige among young people because they perceive it as belonging to the past.

Italian mother tongue speakers in Canada
Year	Population	% of non-official language mother tongue speakers in Canada	% of all language mother tongue speakers in Canada	% of Italian Canadians	Total % change
1991	449,660	12.7%	1.7%	39.2%	N/A
1996	484,500	10.5%	1.7%	40.1%	+7.7%
2001	469,485	9.0%	1.6%	37.0%	−3.1%
2006	455,040	7.4%	1.5%	31.5%	−3.1%
2011	407,485	6.2%	1.2%	27.4%	−10.5%
2016	375,645	5.1%	1.1%	23.7%	−7.8%
2021	319,505	4.1%	0.9%	20.7%	−14.9%

Knowledge of the Italian language in Canada
Year	Population
1991	701,910
1996	694,125
2001	680,970
2006	660,945
2011	595,600
2016	N/A
2021	547,655

=== Italiese and Italianese ===
A distinction is made in the literature of the Italian-Canadian language into italiese and italianese. The combination of English, Italian dialects and standard Italian gives rise to Italiese, a term coined by Gianrenzo Clivio in 1975, referring to the language spoken by the descendants of Italian immigrants in Canada. Italiese has the morphosyntax of standard Italian, a largely English vocabulary and the typical pronunciation of the dialect of the area of origin.

The term was later employed to refer to English used in the United States, England, Australia and New Zealand, and recently it is also used in Italy to refer to borrowings from English.

Italiese differs from the language spoken in French-speaking areas, Italianese, in that the language borrowings come not only from Canadian English but also from Canadian French, another official language of Canada spoken particularly in Quebec, Ontario and New Brunswick.

Thus, Italiese and Italianese consist of a mixture of Italian dialect, standard Italian (although not spoken fluently by the majority of speakers), borrowings from Canadian English or Canadian French, and represent a common Italian code for communication between speakers of different dialects. Pronunciation varies depending on the dialect of origin of the speaker.

=== Language erosion ===
==== Lexicon ====
According to Clivio and Danesi (2000) and Villata (2010), lexical borrowings constitute a psycholinguistic response to the new country and refer to objects and ideas from the immigrant's working and social world: home, work tools, everyday objects, feelings and clothing. In other words, they describe all those terms that are essential for everyday communication and for moving within the new environment.

Below is a list of some borrowings of common English words that have been transformed into the Italian-Canadian form:

- storo (store);
- sinco (sink);
- checca (cake);
- morgheggio (mortgage);
- fenza (fence);
- ticchetta (ticket);
- pusciare (to push);
- pintare (to paint);
- frisare (to freeze);
- smarto (smart);
- cippe (cheap).

Below is a list of some common French word borrowings that have been transformed into the Italian-Canadian form:

- asciuranza (assurance);
- cava (cave);
- majorità (majorité);
- fermare (fermer);
- sciomaggio (chomage).

In some cases the possibility of borrowing from both languages has led to having two equivalent terms, one French and one English, to designate the same concept. For example, the Italian-Canadian word "permesso" comes from French permis de conduire which has as its equivalent from English "licenza" from driving license or "magazine" which comes from French magasin which has as its equivalent from English "storo" from store. According to Villata (1990), French was the basis for the Italian-Canadian lexicon of the first generation, while the second generation mostly used terms from English.

There are also frequent occurrences of using Italian words that resemble English but have different meanings:

- "gioco" (joke);
- "messa" (mess);
- "principale" (principal);
- "sopportare" (to support);
- "tronco" (trunk).

From the lexical point of view in Italian-Canadian, the phenomena of calques are also frequent, that is, "a particular type of borrowing for which in the receiving language the word is not taken over, but its structure is reproduced," such as "aspetto per" (Eng. I'm waiting for), "fa senso" (Eng. it makes sense), "guardi bene" (Eng. you look well [good]).

The use of diminutives is very common, e.g., forms such as "È passato un trocchetto" (Standard Italian "camioncino", Eng. little truck), "bechiceddra" ("small bag", from bag, influenced by the Cosentino dialect) and "loncitieddru" ("little lunch", from lunch, influenced by the Cosentino dialect) are attested.

==== Morphosyntax ====
In a study carried out by Kristin Reinke based on 30 in-depth interviews with Italian-Canadians conducted from 1999 to 2004 and published in 2006, some interesting aspects emerge regarding the morphosyntax used by Italian-Canadians.

===== Nouns: gender and number =====
Regarding nouns and any errors determined by their use, there is a significant difference between the first generation and the second generation: 2.8% and 5.0% of the nouns used by the two groups of speakers, respectively, have deviations from the standard. While 65.5% of the errors are due to incorrect use of gender, 35.5% refer to number. These percentages confirm what has been shown by studies on learning Italian as a foreign language: gender is acquired later than number. The errors mainly concern nouns in the plural (85.1 percent) and the feminine gender and to a large extent may be related to language contact with the French language; this could explain forms such as "artrose" (instead of "artrosi") on influence from French arthrose, a "libre" (instead of a "libro") on influence from livre, "le tax" (instead of "tasse") from les tax and "le program televisive" (instead of "i programmi televisivi") from French les programs. In addition, 26.3 percent of the errors concern the application of the -i ending, of class I (e.g. libro/libri) and masculine class III (e.g. fiore/fiori), to nouns that belong to the inflectional class II (e.g. personi instead of persone). In this case there is no influence of French but one of the hypotheses to explain this phenomenon is the contact with some Italian-Romance dialects such as Sicilian, which uses a single plural gender marker (Rohlfs, 1968; Varvaro, 1988). The deviated forms cannot be due to an influence of English, since in this language there is no reference to gender except in special cases. On the contrary, knowledge of the gender rule would lead to its addition where not necessary in terms present in the standard vocabulary and would be the consequence of forms attested in the language used by Italian-Canadians such as barro (bar), sporto (sport), nordo (north), sudo (south) and clubi (club). Some nouns such as associazione, generazione, informazione, etc., frequently become invariable and are used in the singular, most likely in analogy to the inflectional class II ending in -e; it is therefore possible that speakers already perceive the ending -e as a plural marker. The same conclusion is reported by Chini (1995) in his study on the acquisition of Italian as L2 and by Bettoni (1991) on spoken Italian in Australia.

===== Personal pronouns: use of voi instead of lei =====
The first generation of Italian-Canadians, according to Reinke's studies, make errors in the use of personal pronouns in 1.1% of cases, the second generation in 3.0% of cases. On some occasions, by Sicilian descendants, the Sicilian form idu is used instead of lui. In general, the most frequent error is the use of the second person plural voi instead of the third person singular lei (66.6%). This can be traced in part from linguistic contact with French where the polite form is, in fact, the second person plural vous; in part the phenomenon is also present in the Italian language although in rare, archaic cases or those expressing deep respect. Voi is, moreover, currently considered the polite form in several Italian regions such as Calabria, Naples, northern Apulia, Rome, Ticino and Corsica (Rohlfs 1969), Campania (Radtke 1988) and Sicily (Varvaro 1988).

==== Morphology ====
===== Verbs: the subjunctive =====
89.9% of the verbs used during interviews conducted by Reinke with Italian-Canadians belong to standard Italian: the first generation used 4.3% wrong forms and the second generation 16.9%. In general, there was a tendency not to use the subjunctive (98.4% of cases), a tendency that is also manifested after all in Italy (Berruto, 1987). In thirty interviews only two forms of the subjunctive were recorded as being used correctly ("sembra che sia una cosa buone", "a meno che non piova") along with two phenomena of overcorrections ("e allora ecco perché ci sia la differenza", "so(no) veramente, come si dice, non mi vengono"). The subjunctive is replaced by the expressions forse, probabilmente, può darsi ("credo che forse ha ragione") or the future tense, an orientation also observed in spoken Italian in Italy. Another frequent error observed in dialogues is the omission of the conjunction che ("non penso [che] sarà come adesso / penso piuttosto / sarà come a New York, mi sembra [che] sarà un po' difficile you know"), probably due to the influence of English since the word that, under certain conditions, can be implied. The tendency to avoid or misspell the subjunctive can be traced largely to the limited use of the subjunctive in the dialects of southern Italy, areas from where emigration to Canada has mostly been active. A further reason can be traced to the widespread idea of the difficulty in its use and its low functionality, so much so that in countries where Italian is learned as a second language it is the last verbal tense to be studied.

==== Syntax ====
===== Omission of determinative articles before the possessive =====
In Italian-Canadian there is a high number of deviations from the standard about the use of possessives (17.0%). First-generation Italian-Canadian speakers use 8.0% deviated forms from the standard and second-generation speakers 18.9%. The most frequent error (18.4% of cases) is the omission of the determinative article in front of a possessive ("mio paese," "mio libro"). One explanation for this phenomenon may be contact with English and French where the article+possessive form does not exist or, as Berruto (1993) believes, this can be traced back to working-class Italian. The lack of the article also characterizes the Italian of workers in Switzerland (Berruto 1990; Beretta 1990; Valentini 1990; Berruto 1991; Banfi 1993 and 1994; Chini 1995; Chini and Ferraris 2003) and Italian in other emigration contexts (Bettoni 1990; Gobbi 1994).

==== Orthography ====
From the orthographic point of view, numerous are the phenomena of approximations, that is, English or French words that are spelled as they would appear in Italian, such as donguori (don't worry) and tencsalotto (thanks a lot) (Clivio 1986; Danesi 1985).

=== Code-switching ===
Code-switching "is the switching from one language to another within the speech of the same speaker. [...] It is not to be confused with code alternation, which is instead the choice of one or other of the languages spoken by a bilingual speaker depending on the situation or communicative sphere (family, friends, school, university, offices, stores, etc.)."

Code-switching is now frequently used by second and third generations who, unlike their grandparents, rarely resort to the "Italianization" of English terms and, when they have difficulty with expressing themselves in Italian, use the corresponding English term ("Arrivederci and take care easy").

In addition, code-switching is found, both in writing and speaking, to differentiate those dialogues and situations that occur in the home environment from the language used at work or in the community. For example, in the case of three Italian-Canadian authors such as Nino Ricci (Leamington, 1959), Frank Paci (Pesaro, 1948), and Mary Melfi (Rome, 1957), Italian and its dialects are employed to identify those who belong to the Italian community, for dialogues and for terms used in family intimacy (Camarca, 2005). Code-switching in literature is also employed as a tool to increase the realism of certain scenes, to highlight the importance of the language and culture of belonging (Jonsson, 2005) and to represent the author's internal voice when it appears within the narrative text (Callahan, 2004).

== Italian culture in Canada ==
The dissemination of Italian language and culture was encouraged from the postwar period through the mass media and schools, which were important in keeping alive the sense of belonging to one's country of origin.

=== Italian language teaching in Canada ===
As of 2019, Italian is being learned as a foreign language in Canada by 37,375 students, the 12th most of any country.

Interest in the Italian language is mainly for personal reasons and the desire to relate to family members of Italian origin, as well as cultural and sometimes professional enrichment; several journalists, scholars, doctors and artists are Italian language learners.

==== The teaching of Italian in the school system ====
Within the Canadian school system Italian is one of the so-called International Languages and Italian language programs are called Extended Day. In 2023, there were 6,000 elementary-aged students enrolled in the Italian language extended day program in the York Catholic District School Board. Usually within schools, curricular subjects are taught only in French or English, and as a result the curricular teaching of a third language starting in secondary school is a limited experience. In general, in most classes, the teaching of Italian is optional and takes place on Saturday mornings; in others, where the majority of the district's residents are of Italian descent, the teaching of Italian is integrated with the other curricular subjects and involves all students, including those who are not of Italian descent. For elementary schools, no special qualifications are required of language teachers other than that they know the language. In middle and high schools, teaching staff are required to possess specific qualifications.

In many Canadian universities, such as those in the province of Quebec and the four main universities of Montreal, there are Italian sections in the Foreign Languages departments. However, it is necessary to have a minimum number of enrolled students to activate the course and universities often fail to meet these requirements.

==== The teaching of Italian outside of schools ====
Extracurricular Italian language courses are taught by Management Bodies, nonprofit organizations whose aim is to promote and disseminate the Italian language and culture.

Ten Management Bodies are active in Canada:

- Italian-Canadian Cultural Association (ICCA) of Nova Scotia;
- Patronato Italo-Canadese Assistenza agli Immigrati (PICAI);
- Centro Scuola Dante Alighieri (CESDA);
- The Italian Canadian Youth Formation Centre;
- Centro Scuola e Cultura Italiana;
- Società Dante Alighieri – Comitato di Winnipeg;
- Hamilton Dante Centre for Italian Language and Culture;
- Italian Cultural Centre;
- Società Dante Alighieri – Comitato di Edmonton;
- Centro Linguistico e Culturale italiano di Calgary (CLCIC).

Italian cultural institutes (IICs) also carry out activities for the dissemination of Italian language and culture in the world "[...] through the preparation of an annual cultural program as well as through the creation of a network of relationships with the institutions of the host countries, proposing themselves as propelling centres of cultural cooperation, activities and initiatives and contributing, in particular, to the creation of favourable conditions for the integration of Italian professionals in international cultural contexts." Two IICs are active in Canada: the one in Montréal and the one in Toronto. Also active in Canada is the Dante Alighieri Society with seven branches in Edmonton, Montreal, Ottawa, Québec, Vancouver, Windsor and Winnipeg. In addition to the Management Bodies and IICs, there are other associations involved in organizing Italian language courses, some internal to universities such as U.S. News Education and the Italian Association of Language Agents and Consultants for Study Abroad (IALCA). There is also Immigration Canada: Studying in Canada, which also deals with study-stay programs for foreign students.

In 2017, under the Renzi and Gentiloni governments, four-year funds were established for the management bodies worth €150 million, broken down as follows: €112,350,000 to the Toronto Centre School, €35,000 to PICAI, €15,000 to CESDA, €67,000 to the Vancouver ICC, €4,000 to the Edmonton management body, and €4,000 to the Dante Alighieri in Edmonton. These grants were made in order to promote Italian language and culture. In 2019, PICAI had to discontinue Italian language courses due to a lack of funding, mobilizing parents of students who signed a petition requesting that contributions be reinstated.

=== Radio and television ===
Son to Italian immigrants, Johnny Lombardi was born in The Ward in 1915, and went on to found one of the first multilingual radio stations in Canada, CHIN in 1966, in Palmerston–Little Italy.

Dan Iannuzzi founded the first multicultural television station in Canada (CFMT-TV), which began operations in Toronto in 1979. Now owned by Rogers Sports & Media, it is one of the flagship stations of the Canadian multilingual network Omni Television.

Montreal's CJNT dubbed some of E!'s programming, including documentary-based shows such as E! True Hollywood Story, in Spanish, Portuguese and Italian, to help partially fulfill CJNT's ethnic programming requirements. Montreal's CFMB multilingual radio station established in 1962 broadcasts Italian-language programs weekdays from 5:00 a.m. to 6:00 pm.

Telelatino (TLN) is a Canadian English-language specialty channel that primarily broadcasts lifestyle programming surrounding the Latin American and Italian cultures, including cooking and travel-related programs, as well as coverage of international soccer, and mainstream television series and films. Telebimbi is an Italian language specialty channel owned by TLN Media Group that broadcasts programming primarily aimed at children.

Rai Italia, Mediaset Italia and Mediaset TGCOM 24 are also popular Italian-made channels that can be purchased.

=== Newspapers and magazines ===
The first Italian-language newspaper in Canada was Il Lavoratore, an anti-Fascist publication which was founded in Toronto in 1936 and active for two years. Then came La Voce degli Italo Canadesi, founded in Toronto (1938–1940) and Il Cittadino Canadese, founded in Montreal in 1941, followed by La Vittoria of Toronto, in 1942–1943. After WWII came Il Corriere Italiano, founded by Alfredo Gagliardi in Montreal in the early 1950s. Corriere Canadese, founded by Dan Iannuzzi in 1954, is Canada's only Italian-language daily today and is published in Toronto; its weekend (English-language) edition is published as Tandem.

Other newspapers include Il Marco Polo (Vancouver), founded in 1974, Insieme (Montreal), Lo Specchio (Toronto), Panoram Italia (Toronto) founded in 2002 by Antonio Zara, L'Ora di Ottawa (Ottawa) and Il Postino (Ottawa). Il Postino was established in 2000, by a young group of local Ottawa Italian Canadians to convey the history of the Italian community in Ottawa. Insieme was founded by the Italian Catholic parishes of Montreal but has since been put under private ownership. It nevertheless retains an emphasis on religious articles.

Eyetalian magazine was launched in 1993 as a challenging, independent magazine of Italian-Canadian culture. It encountered commercial difficulty, and leaned towards a general lifestyle magazine format before concluding publication later in the 1990s. Italo of Montreal is published sporadically and is written in Italian, with some articles in French and English, dealing with current affairs and community news. La Comunità, while an older publication, was taken over by the youth wing of the National Congress of Italian Canadians (Québec chapter) in the late 1990s. It experimented with different formats but was later cancelled due to lack of funding. In the 1970s the trilingual arts magazine Vice Versa flourished in Montreal. In, 2003 Domenic Cusmano founded Accenti, the magazine which focused on culture and Italian-Canadian authors.

=== Literature ===
Italian Canadian literature emerged in the 1970s as young Italian immigrants began to complete university degrees across Canada. This creative writing exists in English, French, or Italian. Some writers like Antonio D'Alfonso, Marco Micone, Alexandre Amprimoz and Filippo Salvatore are bilingual and publish in two languages. The older generation of authors like Maria Ardizzi, Romano Perticarini, Giovanni Costa and Tonino Caticchio publish in Italian or in bilingual volumes. In English the most notable names are novelists Frank G. Paci, Nino Ricci, Caterina Edwards, Michael Mirolla and Darlene Madott. Poets who write in English include Mary di Michele, Pier Giorgio Di Cicco and Gianna Patriarca. In 1986 these authors established the Association of Italian-Canadian Writers, and by 2001 there were over 100 active writers publishing books of poetry, fiction, drama and anthologies. With the 1985 publication of Contrasts: Comparative Essays on Italian-Canadian Writing by Joseph Pivato, the academic study of this literature started, leading to the exploration of other ethnic minority writing in Canada and inspiring other scholars such as Licia Canton, Pasquale Verdicchio and George Elliott Clarke. The important collections of literary works are: The Anthology of Italian-Canadian Writing (1998) edited by Joseph Pivato and Pillars of Lace: The Anthology of Italian-Canadian Women Writers (1998) edited by Marisa De Franceschi. See also Writing Cultural Difference: Italian-Canadian Creative and Critical Works (2015) editors Giulia De Gasperi, Maria Cristina Seccia, Licia Canton and Michael Mirolla.

=== Slang ===
A very popular Italian-Canadian slang, primarily in Ontario, is “mangia cake” to describe English Canadians. Its origins trace back to 1975, and came into being because to those arriving from Italy, Wonder Bread, squishy and sweetened, was more akin to a type of cake than to real bread.

== See also ==
- Languages of Canada
- Italian Canadians

== Bibliography ==
- Audenino, P.; Tirabassi, M. (2008). Migrazioni italiane. Storia e storie dell'Ancien régime a oggi. Milan: Bruno Mondatori. pp. 43–48.
- Avveduto, S. (December 2004). La mobilità delle alte qualifiche in Europa, Canada e USA in Studi emigrazione, anno XLI. pp. 889–910.
- Babaee, Naghmeh (2012). Heritage Language Learning in Canadian Public Schools: Language Rights Challenges. University of Manitoba.
- Baldo, Michela (2019). Italian-Canadian Narratives of Return: Analysing Cultural Translation in Diasporic Writing. Palgrave Macmillan.
- Blake, Raymond (2009). From Rights To Needs. A History of Family Allowances in Canada 1929–1992. Vancouver-Toronto: UBC Press. pp. 13–22.
- Bumsted, Jack M. (2007). A history of the Canadian peoples. Oxford: Oxford University Press. pp. 394–405.
- Cachey, T. (2016). America amica-amara: sugli studi di letteratura italiana nell'America del Nord.
- Cameron, E. (2004). Multiculturalism and Immigration in Canada: An Introductory Reader. Toronto: Canadian Scholars' Press.
- Casini, S. (April 2017). Italianismi e pseudoitalianismi a Toronto: una ricerca tra gli studenti di italiano del St. George Campus della University of Toronto, in Italica. pp. 153–176.
- Cherchi, P.; Reed, C. Seno (2010). Gli italiani e l'italiano nell'America del Nord. Ravenna: Longo Editore. ISBN 978-88-8063-659-5.
- Costantini, Dino (2009). Politiche migratorie e discriminazione: il caso francese, in Bollettino telematico di filosofia politica.
- De Gasperi, G. La comunità italo-canadese di Dominion, Capo Bretone, Canada: Tradizione, continuità e cambiamento, in La Ricerca Folklorica. April 2011. pp. 135–143.
- Franzina, Emilio (April 1989). Emigrazione transoceanica e ricerca storica in Italia: gli ultimi dieci anni (1978–1988), in Altreitalie.
- Franzina, E. (2002). Storia dell'emigrazione italiana, Arrivi. Vol. II. Rome: Donzelli. pp. 717–738.
- Gabaccia, Donna R. (2009). L'Italia fuori d'Italia, in Storia d'Italia Annali 24. Migrazioni. Turin: Einaudi. pp. 226–230.
- Gatto, V. (2012). L'italiese in Canada: considerazioni sul lessico by Giovanni Scarola, in Italica. pp. 126–127.
- Gebbia, A. (2008). Gli italiani in Canada: storia e cultura, in Semestrale di studi e ricerche in geografia.
- MacDonald, John S.; MacDonald, Leatrice D. (1964). Chain Migration Ethnic Neighborhood Formation and Social Networks, in The Milbank Memorial Fund Quarterly. pp. 82–97.
- Marshall, D. (2006). The Social Origins of the Welfare State. Québec Families, Compulsory Education and Family Allowances. Waterloo (Ontario): Wilfrid Laurier University Press. pp. 184–188.
- Maugeri, G. (April 2016). L'insegnamento della lingua e della cultura italiana a Montréal: a colloquio con il direttore dell'Istituto italiano di cultura Martin Stiglio, in Bollettino Itals.
- Messina, N. (1976). Considerazioni sull'emigrazione italiana dopo l'unità (1876–1879). Naples. pp. 247–251.
- Milani, C. (2006). Aspetti dialettali nel lessico di emigrati italiani in ambiente anglofono, facente parte di Lessicografia dialettale. Padova: Antenore. pp. 683–705.
- Milani, C. (2009). Varia Linguistica. Milan: EDUCatt Università Cattolica. pp. 375–449.
- Poggi, I. (2008). La lingua italiana a Montréal, in Centro Altreitalie.
- Poggi, I. (2009). La comunità italiana a Montréal e la questione linguistica, in Centro Altreitalie.
- Ramirez, B. (1989). The Italians in Canada. Ottawa: Canadian Historical Association.
- Reinke, K. (2014). Language contact in a multilingual setting. The attractive force of Italo-romance dialects on Italian in Montréal, in Congruence in Contact-Induced Language Change: Language Families, Typological Resemblance, and Perceived Similarity di Juliane Besters-Dilge et al., Berlino, De Gruyter. pp. 149–167.
- Saidero, D. (2009). Le maschere dell'io: identità transculturale nella poesia italo-canadese, in Oltreoceano. Dialogare con la poesia: voci di donne dalle Americhe all'Australia.
- Scarfi, S. (2011). La costruzione di un'identità italo-canadese attraverso l'arte. Il ruolo dell'istituto italiano di cultura di Toronto., tesi di laurea presso Università Cà Foscari Venezia. pp. 42–49.
- Servizio studi Camera dei deputati (2019). Le attività nel campo della promozione culturale italiana all'estero nell'anno 2017.
- Tirabassi, Maddalena (2002). Bevilacqua, Piero; De Clementi, Andreina; Franzina, Emilio (eds.). "Gli italiani sul web". Storia dell'emigrazione Italiana. 2. Roma: Donzelli: 717–738.
- Troilo, M. (2011). Lavoro ed imprenditoria degli italiani in Canada, tra vecchie e nuove generazioni, in Diacronie.
- Vedovelli, M. (2001). L'italiano lingua seconda, in Italia e all'estero. Institut de linguistique de l'Université de Neuchâtel. pp. 11–48.
- Villata, B. Parlate regionali in Italia e italiano all'estero due lingue diverse con gli stessi problemi, in Fondazione Enrico Eandi.
- Villata, B. (2010). L'italianese- L'italiano comune parlato a Montréal. Montréal: Lòsna & Tron.
- Zanfino, A. (2013). Sui calabresi a Toronto Associazionismo, folklore e... "italiese", in Rivista calabrese di Storia del '900. pp. 109–122. ISSN 2281-5821.
