= CONCACAF Gold Cup =

Association football tournament

- Organizer(s): CONCACAF
- Founded: 1991; 35 years ago
- Region: North America; Central America; Caribbean
- Teams: 16; 41 (qualifiers)
- Related competitions: CONCACAF Championship
- Current champion: Mexico (10th title)
- Most championships: Mexico (10 titles)
- Website: concacaf.com/gold-cup
- 2027 CONCACAF Gold Cup

The CONCACAF Gold Cup (Spanish: Copa Oro CONCACAF) is an association football competition organized by CONCACAF as the primary continental tournament for men's senior national teams from North America, Central America and the Caribbean. The tournament is held every two years with its inaugural edition in 1991. It is the direct successor competition of the CONCACAF Championship (1963–1989).

So far, three national teams have won the tournament: Mexico (10 times), the United States (7), and Canada (1). All of them are member associations of the North American Football Union (NAFU).

== History ==
=== NAFC and CCCF Championships (precursor competitions) ===
Association football in the continent was divided into two regional confederations, which were the two predecessor confederations of CONCACAF before its founding in 1961. The two governing bodies consisted of the Confederación Centroamericana y del Caribe de Fútbol (CCCF) founded in 1938 as the former governing body of football in Central America and Caribbean, and the North American Football Confederation (NAFC) founded in 1946 as the former governing body of football in North America (United States, Mexico, Canada, and Cuba). Each confederation held its own premier regional competition for senior national teams. The CCCF Championship was held 10 times, from 1941 to 1961 with Costa Rica winning seven titles, and also El Salvador, Haiti and Panama winning one title each. The NAFC Championship was held twice (1947 and 1949) with Mexico winning both titles.

=== CONCACAF Championship (1963–1989) ===
CONCACAF was founded in 1961 through the merging of NAFC and CCCF which resulted in a single championship being held for the continent. The first CONCACAF tournament was held in 1963 in El Salvador with Costa Rica becoming the first champion. The CONCACAF Campeonato de Naciones, as it was called, was held every two years from 1963 to 1973. The second tournament was held in Guatemala in 1965 when Mexico defeated the host country in the final of a six-team tournament. The 1967 competition was held in Honduras and saw a third champion crowned, Guatemala. Costa Rica won their second title as hosts in 1969, knocking off Guatemala, while two years later, Mexico won their second championship as the tournament moved to Trinidad and Tobago, the first time in the Caribbean. In 1973, the tournament kept the same format of six teams playing a single round-robin, but there were bigger stakes attached: CONCACAF's berth in the FIFA World Cup tournament in 1974. In Port-au-Prince, Haiti, the host country pulled off an upset by winning the tournament and claiming a spot in the World Cup in West Germany.

With the Campeonato de Naciones doubling as the final World Cup qualifying tournament, the next two editions were held in Mexico City and Tegucigalpa, Honduras in 1977 and 1981, respectively. In each case the host country was crowned champion and earned a spot in the World Cup. In 1985 and 1989, the winner of the World Cup qualifying tournament was again crowned Confederation champion. Canada and Costa Rica were named champions in 1985 and 1989, receiving a trophy.

=== CONCACAF Gold Cup (1991–present) ===
In 1990, CONCACAF renamed and restructured the CONCACAF Championship as the CONCACAF Gold Cup, with the United States hosting the first competition in 1991, and hosting or co-hosting every subsequent iteration of the tournament (as of 2025). The host country was the inaugural champion of the eight-team tournament. Mexico dominated the remainder of the decade, winning three consecutive CONCACAF Gold Cup titles in 1993, 1996 and 1998.

In 1996, the Gold Cup field included its first guest team, the defending FIFA World Cup Champions Brazil. Guests were invited to participate in the six Gold Cup tournaments from 1996 to 2005. Starting with the 2000 Gold Cup, the tournament field was increased to twelve teams and for the 2007 tournament, the Gold Cup again was contested exclusively by nations within CONCACAF.

The 2007 Gold Cup hosts successfully defended their title beating Mexico in the final 2–1 in Chicago; Canada and Guadeloupe shared third place. Mexico won the 2009 Gold Cup by beating the United States 5–0. In the 2011 Gold Cup, Mexico defeated the USA 4–2 in the final while the USA won the 2013 Gold Cup by beating Panama 1–0.

Before 2015, when the Gold Cup did not fall in the same year as the FIFA Confederations Cup, the winner, or highest-placed team that is a member of both CONCACAF and FIFA, qualified for the next staging of that tournament. In 2015, the winners of the previous two Gold Cups (the 2013 and 2015 editions) faced each other in CONCACAF Cup – a playoff to determine the CONCACAF entrant to the 2017 Confederations Cup. In January 2017, Victor Montagliani announced the expansion of the Gold Cup from 12 to 16 teams, starting with the 2019 tournament.

The CONCACAF Nations League was introduced in 2018 as a secondary national team competition and as a qualifier for the Gold Cup. However, due to scheduling conflicts from other major international and club competitions, the 2021, 2023, and 2025 Gold Cups were downplayed, with the Nations League title instead being prioritized by major CONCACAF teams.

Since the formation of the Gold Cup in 1991, the CONCACAF Championship has been won ten times by Mexico, seven times by the United States, and once by Canada. Runners-up include Brazil, Colombia, Costa Rica, Honduras, Panama, and Jamaica. Also, every edition which had matches held outside the United States has been won by Mexico.

== Competition format ==
The number of teams in the final tournament has gradually increased over the years. Each tournament has consisted of a round-robin group stage followed by a single-elimination knockout stage.

In the 2025 Gold Cup edition the extra time rule was abandoned, except for the final. When there is a draw it will go straight to a penalty shoot out.

There has been interest from numerous sources to have the tournament held every four years to potentially increase the prestige, decrease player fatigue and better align with the European and South American calendars.

Year	Teams	Matches	Group stage	Final stages
1991–1993	8	16	2 groups of 4 teams	4-team knockout (group winners and runners-up)
1996	9	13	3 groups of 3 teams	4-team knockout (group winners plus best runner-up)
1998	10	16	3 groups of 3 or 4 teams	4-team knockout (group winners plus best runner-up)
2000	12	19	4 groups of 3 teams	8-team knockout (group winners and runners-up)
2002–2003	12	20	4 groups of 3 teams	8-team knockout (group winners and runners-up)
2005–2013	12	25	3 groups of 4 teams	8-team knockout (group winners and runners-up, plus 2 best 3rd-placed teams)
2015	12	26	3 groups of 4 teams	8-team knockout (group winners and runners-up, plus 2 best 3rd-placed teams)
2017	12	25	3 groups of 4 teams	8-team knockout (group winners and runners-up, plus 2 best 3rd-placed teams)
2019–2025	16	31	4 groups of 4 teams	8-team knockout (group winners and runners-up)
2027–present	16	39	2 groups of 8 teams	8-team knockout (Top 4 from each group)

== Results ==
Ed.	Year	Hosts	Final			Third place match or losing semi-finalists			Number of teams
Ed.	Year	Hosts	Champions	Score	Runners-up	Third place	Score	Fourth place	Number of teams
1	1991	United States	United States	0–0 (4–3 p)	Honduras	Mexico	2–0	Costa Rica	8
2	1993	Mexico; United States	Mexico	4–0	United States	Costa Rica Jamaica	1–1 (a.e.t.) (Note: Both teams shared the third position after extra time as a penalty shoot-out was not held.)	–	8
3	1996	United States	Mexico	2–0	Brazil	United States	3–0	Guatemala	9
4	1998	United States	Mexico	1–0	United States	Brazil	1–0	Jamaica	10
5	2000	United States	Canada	2–0	Colombia	Peru and Trinidad and Tobago			12
6	2002	United States	United States	2–0	Costa Rica	Canada	2–1	South Korea	12
7	2003	Mexico; United States	Mexico	1–0 (g.g.)	Brazil	United States	3–2	Costa Rica	12
8	2005	United States	United States	0–0 (3–1 p)	Panama	Colombia and Honduras			12
9	2007	United States	United States	2–1	Mexico	Canada and Guadeloupe			12
10	2009	United States	Mexico	5–0	United States	Costa Rica and Honduras			12
11	2011	United States	Mexico	4–2	United States	Honduras and Panama			12
12	2013	United States	United States	1–0	Panama	Honduras and Mexico			12
13	2015	Canada; United States	Mexico	3–1	Jamaica	Panama	1–1 (3–2 p)	United States	12
14	2017	United States	United States	2–1	Jamaica	Costa Rica and Mexico			12
15	2019	Costa Rica; Jamaica; United States	Mexico	1–0	United States	Haiti and Jamaica			16
16	2021	United States	United States	1–0 (a.e.t.)	Mexico	Canada and Qatar			16
17	2023	Canada; United States	Mexico	1–0	Panama	Jamaica and United States			16
18	2025	Canada; United States	Mexico	2–1	United States	Guatemala and Honduras			16

== Performances ==
Team	Champions	Runners-up	Third place	Fourth place	Semi-finalist	Total
Mexico	10 (1993, 1996, 1998, 2003, 2009, 2011, 2015, 2019, 2023, 2025)	2 (2007, 2021)	1 (1991)	—N/a	2 (2013, 2017)	15
United States	7 (1991, 2002, 2005, 2007, 2013, 2017, 2021)	6 (1993, 1998, 2009, 2011, 2019, 2025)	2 (1996, 2003)	1 (2015)	1 (2023)	17
Canada	1 (2000)	—N/a	1 (2002)	—N/a	2 (2007, 2021)	4
Panama	—N/a	3 (2005, 2013, 2023)	1 (2015)	—N/a	1 (2011)	5
Jamaica	—N/a	2 (2015, 2017)	1 (1993)	1 (1998)	2 (2019, 2023)	6
Brazil	—N/a	2 (1996 (Note: U-23 Represented), 2003 (Note: U-23 Represented))	1 (1998)	—N/a	—N/a	3
Costa Rica	—N/a	1 (2002)	1 (1993)	2 (1991, 2003)	2 (2009, 2017)	6
Honduras	—N/a	1 (1991)	—N/a	—N/a	5 (2005, 2009, 2011, 2013, 2025)	6
Colombia	—N/a	1 (2000)	—N/a	—N/a	1 (2005)	2
Guatemala	—N/a	—N/a	—N/a	1 (1996)	1 (2025)	2
South Korea	—N/a	—N/a	—N/a	1 (2002)	—N/a	1
Guadeloupe	—N/a	—N/a	—N/a	—N/a	1 (2007)	1
Haiti	—N/a	—N/a	—N/a	—N/a	1 (2019)	1
Peru	—N/a	—N/a	—N/a	—N/a	1 (2000)	1
Qatar	—N/a	—N/a	—N/a	—N/a	1 (2021)	1
Trinidad and Tobago	—N/a	—N/a	—N/a	—N/a	1 (2000)	1

Notes

Italic — Hosts

== Debut of teams ==
As of 2025, a total of 33 teams have participated in the CONCACAF Gold Cup. Italicized teams in the table below are not members of CONCACAF; eight such nations have participated.

Year	Debuting teams		
Year	Teams	No.	CT
1991	Canada, Costa Rica, Guatemala, Honduras, Jamaica, Mexico, Trinidad and Tobago, United States	8	8
1993	Martinique, Panama	2	10
1996	Brazil, El Salvador, Saint Vincent and the Grenadines	3	13
1998	Cuba	1	14
2000	Colombia, Haiti, Peru, South Korea	4	18
2002	Ecuador	1	19
2003	None	0	19
2005	South Africa	1	20
2007	Guadeloupe	1	21
2009	Grenada, Nicaragua	2	23
2011	None	0	23
2013	Belize	1	24
2015	None	0	24
2017	Curaçao, French Guiana	2	26
2019	Bermuda, Guyana	2	28
2021	Suriname, Qatar	2	30
2023	Saint Kitts and Nevis	1	31
2025	Dominican Republic, Saudi Arabia	2	33
2027	Saint Lucia	1	34

== Records and statistics ==
=== Champions' results in the Confederations Cup ===
Qualified via	Year	Team	Result
1991 Gold Cup	1992	United States	Third place
1993 Gold Cup	1995	Mexico	Third place
1996 Gold Cup	1997	Mexico	Group stage (3rd)
1998 Gold Cup (1st)	1999	Mexico	Champions
1998 Gold Cup (2nd)	1999	United States	Third place
2000 Gold Cup	2001	Canada	Group stage (4th)
2002 Gold Cup	2003	United States	Group stage (4th)
2003 Gold Cup	2005	Mexico	Fourth place
2007 Gold Cup	2009	United States	Runners up
2011 Gold Cup	2013	Mexico	Group stage (3rd)
2013 Gold Cup	2017	United States	DNQ (Note: Lost qualifying play-off (CONCACAF Cup) to Mexico.)
2015 Gold Cup	2017	Mexico	Fourth place

== Awards ==
There are currently five post-tournament awards:

- Best Player – for the best player throughout the tournament
- Top Scorer – for most prolific goal scorer
- Best Goalkeeper – for most outstanding goalkeeper
- Fair Play Award – for the team with the best record of fair play
- Young Player Award – for the best young player

== Invitees ==
The 1996 Gold Cup was the first iteration to have a guest from a different confederation, Brazil from CONMEBOL. In spite of bringing their under-23 team, Brazil finished as runners-up to Mexico and outplaced seven teams from CONCACAF. For the next decade, six countries from three confederations would make appearances in the Gold Cup; seven of these eleven appearances finished within the top four, including Colombia losing the 2000 final against Canada and Brazil again losing the final against Mexico in 2003. Starting in 2007, CONCACAF would no longer invite guests from other confederations. This was primarily due to giving more opportunities from teams in the region to compete, as there was a rise in performances from the region as evidenced by the FIFA World Ranking.

After a sixteen-year hiatus from guest nations, AFC nation Qatar were invited and participated in the 2021 Gold Cup, losing in the semi-finals to the United States. Qatar also participated in the 2023 tournament, where they lost 4–0 to Panama in the quarter-finals. Saudi Arabia were then invited for both the 2025 and 2027 editions of the tournament, losing in the quarter-finals against Mexico in the former.

=== Invitees nations record ===
Team	Confederation	1996	1998	2000	2002	2003	2005	2021	2023	2025	2027	Editions
Brazil	CONMEBOL	2nd (Note: U-23 Represented)	3rd	–	–	2nd	–	–	–	–	–	3
Colombia	CONMEBOL	–	–	2nd	–	QF	SF	–	–	–	–	3
Peru	CONMEBOL	–	–	SF	–	–	–	–	–	–	–	1
South Korea	AFC	–	–	GS	4th	–	–	–	–	–	–	2
Ecuador	CONMEBOL	–	–	–	GS	–	–	–	–	–	–	1
South Africa	CAF	–	–	–	–	–	QF	–	–	–	–	1
Qatar	AFC	–	–	–	–	–	–	SF	QF	–	–	2
Saudi Arabia	AFC	–	–	–	–	–	–	–	–	QF	TBD	2

== Broadcasting and trophy ==
In Canada, OneSoccer streams all Gold Cup matches, while select matches also air on TSN and RDS through a co-production partnership. Spanish-language rights are sublicensed to TLN and Univision. In Mexico it airs on Netflix. In the United States, the CONCACAF Gold Cup airs on Fox Sports and TUDN (since 2000). CONCACAF also streams Gold Cup matches on YouTube with some geo-restrictions.

The Gold Cup trophy is awarded to the champions of the tournament. The design of the trophy has changed multiple times since its inaugural version but the original concept of a tall, gold-plated cup with angular handles remains mostly the same. Changes have included scaling down of the size as well as replacing the original flat rectangular base with an elevated round pedestal. The base includes engravings of the champion nation with the year in which they won the tournament.

== See also ==
- Continental football championships
- CONCACAF Championship
- CONCACAF Nations League
- CCCF Championship
- NAFC Championship
