= Leonardo World (Canadian TV channel) =

- Leonardo World logo
- Country: Canada
- Broadcast area: National
- Headquarters: Toronto, Ontario

Ownership
- Owner: Telelatino Network Inc. Corus Entertainment (50.5%); Italo Rosati (16.5%); Romeo Di Battista (16.5%); Joseph Vitale (16.5%)

History
- Launched: June 15, 2005
- Closed: September 18, 2007

Leonardo World was a Canadian category 2 Italian language digital cable television channel wholly owned by Telelatino Network Inc. The channel broadcast programming related to Italian arts and culture including cuisine, fashion, travel, and more. It was a Canadian version of the Italian channel, Leonardo World.

== History ==
In December 2000, Telelatino Network was granted approval by the Canadian Radio-television and Telecommunications Commission (CRTC) to launch Sitcom Canada, described as "a national ethnic Category 2 specialty television service directed to Italians/Italian-speaking audiences. The programming will be primarily sourced from existing European thematic satellite services operated by the Sitcom Spa group including its news and information, travel, lifestyle, motoring and Italian design services."

The channel launched in June 2005 initially on Vidéotron as Leonardo World in a package marketed as Super Trio Italiano with 2 other newly launched Telelatino channels, SKY TG24 and Video Italia.

On September 11, 2007, Vidéotron discontinued carriage of Leonardo World and on September 18, 2007 the remaining carriers, Rogers Cable and Mountain Cablevision discontinued carriage of the service. In Telelatino's message posted on its website, they noted that they were "disappointed" with the decisions of the distributors to drop the channel, along with some of the others in the Super Trio Italiano package, suggesting it was not Telelatino's decision to discontinue the service, rather it was a lack of interest from distributors. The unease of the providers would prove correct, as the domestic Italian version of the channel ended a year later.
