= GlobeSailor =

Yacht charter and cruise booking website

- Company type: Private
- Industry: Yacht charter, Travel, Tourism
- Founded: 25 June 2010
- Founders: Olivier Albahary, Evgueni Kocheliaev
- Headquarters: 2 rue Dulong, 75017 Paris, France
- Area served: Worldwide
- Website: www.theglobesailor.com

GlobeSailor is a European yacht charter, cruise comparison and booking platform and online agency.

== History ==
GlobeSailor was founded in Paris, France, in 2010. On 3 June 2010, the company received its first seed investment of €200,000 from Paris Business Angels. On 7 March 2017, GlobeSailor launched its travel agency, becoming the first agency dedicated to yachting and sailing charters. This expansion enabled travelers to book additional sailing-related services alongside yacht rentals.

On 24 October 2017, the company raised €800,000 in a second round of funding, replacing Paris Business Angels with France Investissement Tourisme (BPI). On 5 August 2018, GlobeSailor was recognized as a lauréat by Réseau Entreprendre Paris, and was elected "Boat Rental Company of the Year 2018" by Voile et Moteur.

In December 2021, GlobeSailor acquired its competitor CoolSailing (part of the Skiset), a specialist in yacht and catamaran charters, with or without a skipper, across more than 80 destinations. CoolSailing has been active in the French market for 20 years.

From 2023, the company donates €2 per booking to Surfrider Foundation Europe, specifically for the Échappée Bleue project, which educates disadvantaged youth about environmental conservation through sailing experiences.

GlobeSailor provides access to more than 800 charter operators in 180 international destinations.

Corriere Italiano named GlobeSailor a world leader in its segment.

Yacht.de, a biweekly, German-language magazine, reported that in 2023, GlobeSailor analyzed the booking behavior of 6,200 customers, revealing notable trends in the charter market.

It is also a sponsor of La Ruta de la Sal regatta in the Mediterranean.
