= Video Italia (Canadian TV channel) =

Canadian television channel

- Video Italia logo
- Country: Canada
- Broadcast area: National
- Headquarters: Toronto, Ontario

Ownership
- Owner: Telelatino Network Inc. (80%); Gruppo Radio Italia (20%)

History
- Launched: June 15, 2005
- Closed: September 18, 2007

Video Italia was a Canadian category 2 Italian language digital cable television channel owned by Telelatino Network Inc. (80%) and Gruppo Radio Italia (20%). The channel broadcast primarily music programming such as concerts and music videos. It was a Canadian version of the Italian channel, Video Italia.

== History ==
In December 2000, Telelatino Network was granted approval by the Canadian Radio-television and Telecommunications Commission (CRTC) to launch Video Italia, described as "a national ethnic Category 2 specialty television service consisting of music and entertainment programming directed to Italian/Italian-speaking audiences."

The channel launched in June 2005 initially on Vidéotron in a package marketed as Super Trio Italiano with 2 other newly launched Telelatino channels, SKY TG24 and Leonardo World. All three channels were wholly owned by Telelatino Network with the exception of Video Italia, which was 80% owned by Telelatino Network Inc. and 20% owned by Radio Italia.

On September 11, 2007, Vidéotron discontinued carriage of Video Italia and on September 18, 2007 the remaining carriers, Rogers Cable and Mountain Cablevision discontinued carriage of Video Italia also. In Telelatino's message posted on its website, they noted that they were "disappointed" with the decisions of the distributors to drop the channel, along with some of the others in the Super Trio Italiano package, suggesting it was not Telelatino's decision to discontinue the service, rather it was a lack of interest from distributors.

Original logo of Video Italia
