= Radio Italia Solo Musica Italiana =

Radio Italia - Solo Musica Italiana

Italy
- Broadcast area: Italy; San Marino; Austria; Slovenia; Albania; France; Switzerland; United States; National FM, DTT and DAB (Italy and Ticino), Cable (only in Switzerland), Satellite (FTA), available also on SKY Italia, DISH Network and Internet
- Frequencies: FM several frequencies, change from geographical side to side HB 8 13°E: 12111 / 27500 / 3/4 V EchoStar IX 121°W: Channel 756; EchoStar II and III 148°W and 61.50 °W: Channel 909; SKY Italia Channel 700; DISH Network Channel 909

Programming
- Format: Italian music radio

Ownership
- Owner: Radio Italia S.p.A

History
- First air date: 26 February 1982

Links
- Webcast: Windows Media
- Website: https://www.radioitalia.it/

Radio Italia Solo Musica Italiana is an Italian music radio station based in Cologno Monzese, Italy, entirely devoted to Easy listening Italian music. It was the first to use this format in Italy. It was founded in 1982 by the Italian musician and composer Mario Volanti. In 1990 it was the most listened to commercial radio station in Italy.

In 1996 it expand its coverage using the satellite. In 1997 it launched its website, and from 12 November 2002 it started to do streaming with Windows Media. Besides FM in Italy, Albania, France, Switzerland, DTT and DAB (Italy and Ticino), cable radio (only in Switzerland) and Free to Air on Hotbird 8, it is also available on SKY Italia and Dish Network. In 2007 had 3.776.000 average listeners in Italy.

In the 90s a second station was born with the name of Radio Italia Anni 60, airing in syndication on Italian soil and broadcasting music from 60s, 70s and 80s. One of the shows of the radio was Rit Parade, hosted in the weekend by Stefano Cilio, presenting a selection of the most popular Italian songs.

== See also ==
- Video Italia
- Radio Italia TV
