= Radio Italia TV =

- Country: Italy
- Headquarters: Cologno Monzese, Italy

Programming
- Language(s): Italian
- Picture format: 576i (SDTV); 1080i (HDTV)

Ownership
- Owner: Gruppo Radio Italia

History
- Launched: April 2004
- Former names: Radio Italia TV (2004-2005, 2011-); Playlist Italia (2005-2009)

Links
- Website: radioitalia.it

Availability

Terrestrial
- Digital: Channel 70 (SD); Channel 570 (HD)

Radio Italia TV is an Italian music television channel, owned and operated by Gruppo Radio Italia (which own also Radio Italia Solo Musica Italiana), available on the digital terrestrial television network in Italy since 2011. On 31 December 2012 Video Italia ceased broadcasting and merged with the digital terrestrial channel Radio Italia TV.

Specialized in easy listening Italian music, Radio Italia TV was launched in April 2004, but has been closed in 2005 and survived as syndication network along with its satellite counterpart when was closed in July 2009. The channel was re-launched in 2011 by its owner, again on the digital terrestrial television network.
