= Stefano Cilio =

Italian musician (born 1980)

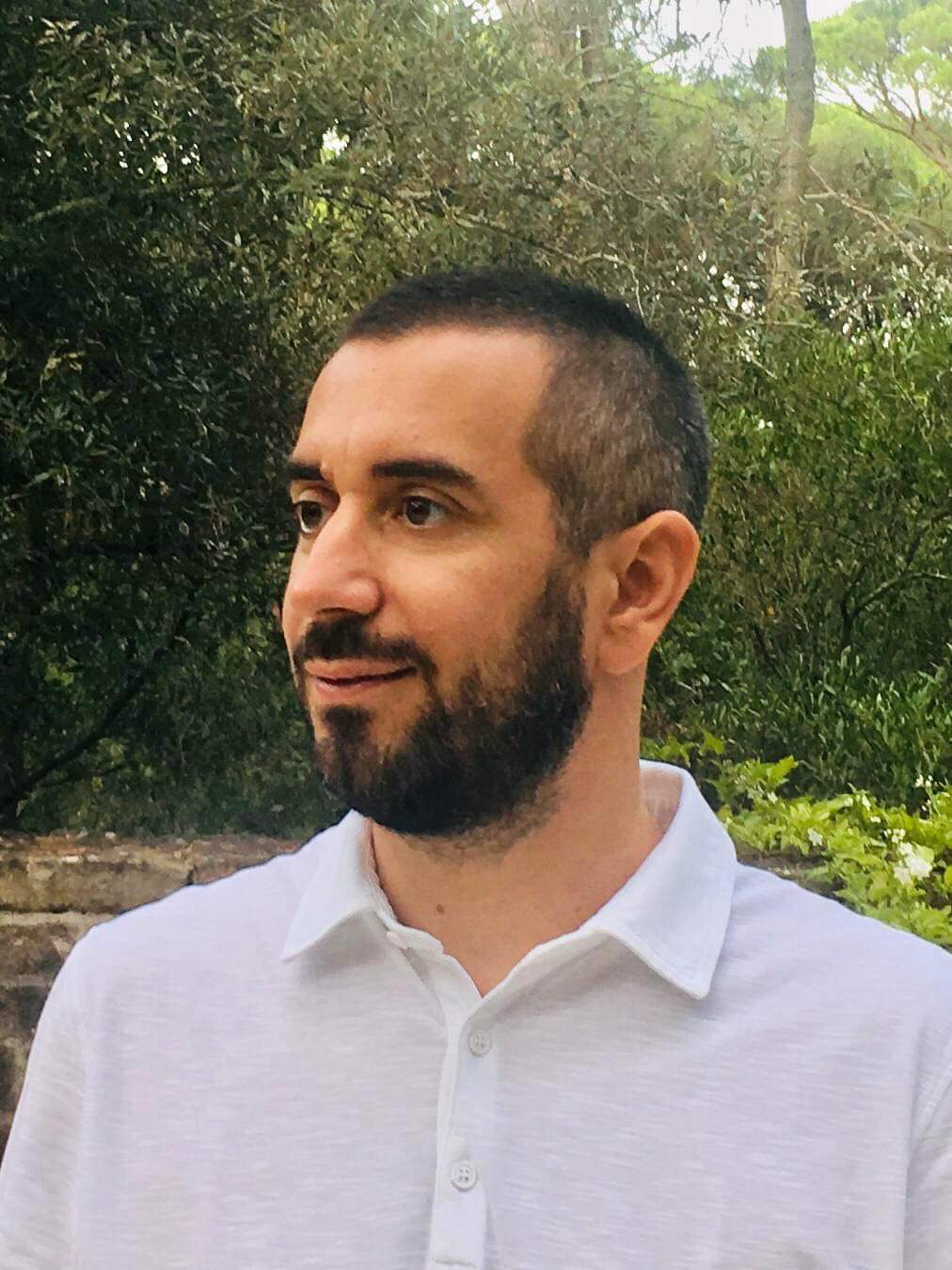
- Cilio in 2019
- Born: 23 November 1980; Milan, Italy
- Education: Università Bocconi di Milano
- Occupation(s): Musician, songwriter, producer, radio personality, writer
- Years active: 2015–present
- Notable work: Mezzo Secolo di Ritornelli, Rit Parade, Glance
- Awards: 3 platinum records and 7 gold records
- Website: stefanocilio.com

Stefano Cilio (born 23 November 1980) is an Italian musician, writer, radio personality and journalist.

== Biography ==
Cilio graduated in economics at Università Bocconi of Milan.

Mezzo Secolo, his first book, earned positive reviews from music publications Rockol and Sentireascoltare as well as from radio stations RTL 102.5, Radio Monte Carlo and m2o. A quiz based on the book with the same name is developed on the Mollybeach program, which is presented by disc jockey and record producer Molella.

In 2019, a new version of the book was published by music publisher Arcana Edizioni, with data as recent as 2018. This edition was critically acclaimed by national magazine Sette, by Radiocity and by Radio Capital, which hosted the author in one of its main programs.

Cilio created a popularity music chart named Rit Parade that allowed him to host a weekly radio chart aired by Radio Italia Anni 60 (909,000 daily listeners), and by some local radios like BluRadio (16,000 daily listeners) and Radio Shake Hit (66,000 daily listeners). From May 2021 to March 2022, the chart was aired by NBC Rete Regione. Since March 2022, the chart has been aired by Radio Cusano Campus, a national radio available all over Italy.

In 2020, he began his journalism career writing weekly articles for the magazine Tutto Settimanale in the music section of the magazine. He comments on the top ten positions of the Rit Parade, providing details and information about songs and artists inside the chart. He also started a collaboration with Italian website Rockol, the most-viewed Italian music news site and one of the top 100 most-viewed websites in Italy (the only music website in this particular chart).

In May 2021, he released his debut music single “Glance”. The song got more than 5 million streams worldwide and was granted with a platinum record by IFPI for selling more than 30.000 copies in Austria. Additionally, the song was awarded a gold record by Mahasz in Hungary after reaching more than 500,000 premium streams and another gold record by RISA in South Africa for selling over 10.000 copies.

His second single “Tonight” was released in October 2021, and went on to the number 1 spot on Spotify in Romania on two different occasions in November, making him the first Italian solo project to reach this milestone in Romania. In 2022, “Tonight” was awarded a platinum record in South Africa and a gold record in Hungary

Cilio's third single “Breathless” was released in January 2022, and it is his first pop song. The song won a platinum record in Hungary and a gold record in Austria and has been streamed over five million times.

In April 2022, Cilio released “Queen”, his fourth single. In the next month, the song entered the Italian Shazam Chart reaching number 16 and went on to number 23 of the global worldwide Shazam electronic chart. It was also the top song in the Italian Shazam Discovery Chart.

== See also ==
- Record chart
- List of record charts
- List of music recording certifications
