= Video Italia =

- Country: Italy
- Broadcast area: Italy, Europe and Worldwide
- Headquarters: Cologno Monzese, Italy

Programming
- Language(s): Italian

Ownership
- Owner: Gruppo Radio Italia

History
- Launched: December 10, 1998
- Closed: December 31, 2012

Links
- Website: www.videoitalia.it

Video Italia was an Italian television channel owned by Gruppo Radio Italia. With Radio Italia Solo Musica Italiana, it telecasted Italian music videos and concerts on SKY Italia channel 712. On 31 December 2012, it was closed and merged with Radio Italia TV.

Original logo of Video Italia

== See also ==
- Radio Italia TV
- Video Italia (Canada)
