= Goal TV (Canadian TV channel) =

Canadian specialty channel

- Country: Canada
- Broadcast area: National
- Headquarters: Toronto, Ontario

Programming
- Picture format: 480i (SDTV)

Ownership
- Owner: TLN Media Group; Joseph Vitale (28%); R. Di Battista Investments (24%); I.P. Rosati Holdings (24%); Aldo Di Felice (24%)

History
- Launched: July 2010

Links
- Website: goaltv.ca

Goal TV is a Canadian specialty channel owned by TLN Media Group. Goal TV primarily features programming related to association football (soccer).

== History ==
In April 2006, TLN Media Group. was granted permission by the Canadian Radio-television and Telecommunications Commission (CRTC) to launch RCS Television, a channel described as "a national, English-language Category 2 specialty programming service devoted to rugby, cricket and soccer."

The channel was launched in July 2010 as EuroWorld Sport featuring primarily programming related to association football including coverage of Ligue 1 from France, Serie A from Italy and coverage of top FIFA tournaments through 2014 including the Men's & Women's World Cup.

In 2025, EuroWorld Sport was re-branded as Goal TV.

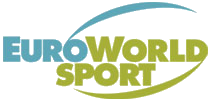
EuroWorld Sport logo

== Programming ==
Since 2015, Goal TV has carried live sports programming on a very occasional basis in the event of programming conflicts on parent channel TLN. For the vast majority of its schedule, Goal TV airs classic games, football documentaries, series & films and paid programming.

Previously the channel also held partial rights to live game broadcasts from France's Ligue 1, Italy's Serie A, the UEFA Europa League, and various FIFA events between 2010 and 2014 (as part of parent company TLN's sublicence from CBC Sports), including the FIFA Confederations Cup and FIFA Beach Soccer World Cup, and multilingual coverage of the 2014 FIFA World Cup. Since August 2012, North American broadcast rights to Ligue 1 and Serie A have been owned by beIN Sports, which did not launch a Canadian channel until 2014, while Europa League rights were acquired by Sportsnet. Bell Media acquired Canadian rights to FIFA events beginning in 2015.

== Rival channels ==
- GolTV Canada
- Sportsnet World

== See also ==
- Telelatino
