= 2003 CONCACAF Gold Cup final =

CONCACAF Gold Cup final, held in Mexico

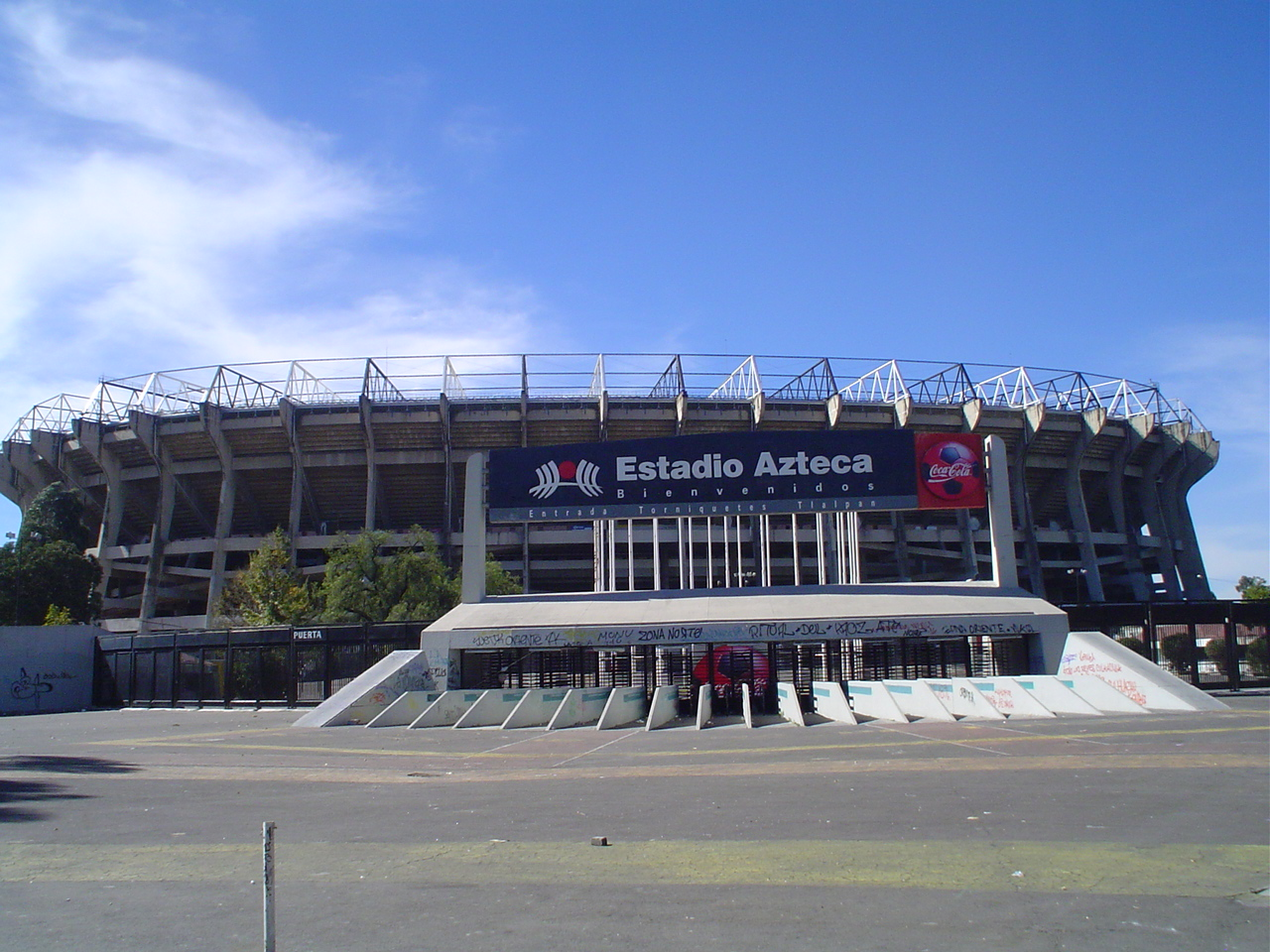
- The Estadio Azteca hosted the final
- Event: 2003 CONCACAF Gold Cup
Brazil	Mexico
0	1
- After golden goal extra time
- Date: 27 July 2003
- Venue: Estadio Azteca, Mexico City
- Referee: Mauricio Navarro (Canada)
- Attendance: 85,000

The 2003 CONCACAF Gold Cup final was the final match of the 2003 CONCACAF Gold Cup, the 7th edition of CONCACAF's competition for men's national football teams. The match was played at Estadio Azteca in Mexico City on 27 July 2003, and was contested by Brazil and Mexico. A rematch of the 1996 final, it was contested by the winners of the semi-finals, Mexico and Brazil. Both teams met in the group stage at the start of the competition, with Mexico beating Brazil 1–0. Both teams progressed to the knockout stage, reaching the final where Mexico would beat Brazil 1–0 again with a late golden goal from Daniel Osorno.

== Route to the final ==
Mexico
Round
Brazil
Opponents
Result
Group stage
Opponents
Result
Brazil
1–0
Match 1
Mexico
0–1
Honduras
0–0
Match 2
Honduras
2–1
Group A winners

Pos	Team	Pld	Pts
1	Mexico	2	4
2	Brazil	2	3
3	Honduras	2	1

Final standings
Group A runners-up

Pos	Team	Pld	Pts
1	Mexico	2	4
2	Brazil	2	3
3	Honduras	2	1

Opponents
Result
Knockout stage
Opponents
Result
Jamaica
5–0
Quarter-finals
Colombia
2–0
Costa Rica
2–0
Semi-finals
United States
2–1 (ASDET)

== Match details ==
27 July 2003

Mexico	1–0 (a.e.t./g.g.)	Brazil
Osorno 97'	Report

Estadio Azteca, Mexico City
Attendance: 65,428
Referee: Mauricio Navarro (Canada)

Mexico
Brazil

GK	1	Oswaldo Sánchez
RB	2	Fernando Salazar	(substituted off) 77'
CB	18	Salvador Carmona
CB	5	Ricardo Osorio
LB	20	Rafael García	(substituted off) 65'
DM	8	Pável Pardo (c)
RM	6	Octavio Valdez
CM	14	Luis Ernesto Pérez
LM	3	Omar Briceño
SS	21	Jesús Arellano	(substituted off) 66'
CF	9	Jared Borgetti
Substitutes:
FW	11	Daniel Osorno	(substituted on) 65'
MF	15	Juan Pablo Rodríguez	(substituted on) 66'
MF	16	Mario Méndez	(substituted on) 77'
Manager:
(Argentina) Ricardo La Volpe

GK	1	Heurelho Gomes
RB	2	Maicon
CB	4	Alex
CB	3	Luisão
LB	5	Adriano	(substituted off) 61'
DM	6	Paulo Almeida
RM	8	Kaká (c)
CM	10	Diego
LM	7	Júlio Baptista
SS	11	Robinho	(substituted off) 46'
CF	15	Nilmar	(substituted off) 90'
Substitutes:
MF	17	Carlos Alberto	(substituted on) 46'
DF	13	Dyego Coelho	(substituted on) 61'
FW	9	Ewerthon	(substituted on) 90'
Manager:
(Brazil) Ricardo Gomes
