= TeleNiños =

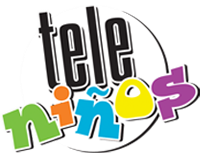
- TeleNiños logo
- Country: Canada
- Broadcast area: National
- Headquarters: Toronto, Ontario, Canada

Programming
- Picture format: 480i (SDTV)

Ownership
- Owner: TLN Media Group; Joseph Vitale (28%); R. Di Battista Investments (24%); I.P. Rosati Holdings (24%); Aldo Di Felice (24%); Investments Inc. (16.5%)
- Sister channels: TLN; Telebimbi

History
- Launched: November 1, 2011

Links
- Website: TeleNiños (in Spanish)

TeleNiños is a Canadian Category B-exempt Spanish language specialty channel owned by TLN Media Group. TeleNiños broadcasts programming primarily aimed at children in addition to select family-oriented programming.

== History ==
In October 2011, TLN Media Group, at the time a consortium majority owned by Corus Entertainment, was granted approval from the Canadian Radio-television and Telecommunications Commission (CRTC) to launch a television channel called All Spanish Children’s Television, described as "a national, niche third-language ethnic specialty Category B service devoted to providing programming to the Spanish-speaking community or to Canadians of Hispanic descent, and who are from preschool age to seventeen years of age."

The channel launched on November 1, 2011 as TeleNiños, exclusively on Vidéotron. On December 4, 2014, TeleNiños launched on Bell Fibe TV. On May 31, 2016, TeleNiños launched on Cogeco. On August 31, 2017, TeleNiños launched on Rogers.

As of February 11, 2019, it and sister channel Telebimbi have operated under exempt status. Shortly after, Corus sold its stake in Telelatino Network to the other co-owners.
