= TGcom24 (Canadian TV channel) =

- Country: Canada
- Broadcast area: National
- Headquarters: Toronto, Ontario

Programming
- Picture format: 1080i (HDTV)

Ownership
- Owner: TLN Media Group; Joseph Vitale (28%); R. Di Battista Investments (24%); I.P. Rosati Holdings (24%); Aldo Di Felice (24%) (24%) Mediaset; MFE - MediaForEurope (original channel)
- Sister channels: Mediaset Italia

History
- Launched: June 15, 2005
- Former names: Sky TG24 (2005 - 2016)

Links
- Website: www.tgcom24.ca

Mediaset TGcom 24 is a Canadian TV channel owned by TLN Media Group. It broadcasts news, information, and current affairs programs primarily from the Italian Mediaset TGCOM 24 channel.

== History ==
In December 2000, the Canadian Radio-television and Telecommunications Commission (CRTC) granted approval to launch a channel called Network Italia, described as "a national ethnic Category 2 specialty television service targeting the Italian community."

The channel launched June 15, 2005 as SKY TG24, broadcasting primarily as a simulcast of the Italian news channel Sky TG24, with Canadian advertising and added Canadian content due to CRTC licensing regulations.

It was primarily distributed through a package with two other channels called Super Trio Italiano; the other two channels being Leonardo World and Video Italia. However, on September 11, 2007, Vidéotron dropped all three channels and on September 18, 2007, all other providers that carried the package dropped the remaining channels except for Sky TG24.

On August 21, 2014, Bell dropped Sky TG24 from their satellite service, it is still available through their Fibe TV service.

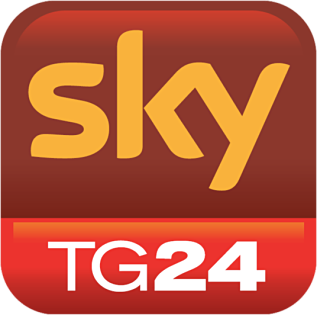
Logo used under the SKY TG24 brand from 2010 to 2016 (taken from the app)

On May 31, 2016, SkyTG 24 launched on Cogeco.

In December 2016, the channel was rebranded Mediaset TGcom 24 and began sourcing its foreign programming from its Italian counterpart, from which its brand is under licence.

Five months later, in May 2017, an HD simulcast of Mediaset TGCOM 24 was launched on Eastlink, as Mediaset TGCOM 24 HD.
