= CFMT-DT =

Television station in Toronto

- Toronto, Ontario; Canada
- Channels: Digital: 30 (UHF); Virtual: 47
- Branding: Omni Television

Programming
- Affiliations: 47.1: Omni Television

Ownership
- Owner: Rogers Sports & Media; (Rogers Media Inc.)
- Sister stations: TV: CITY-DT, CJMT-DT, Sportsnet Ontario; Radio: CFTR, CHFI-FM, CJCL, CKIS-FM

History
- First air date: September 3, 1979
- Former call signs: CFMT-TV (1979–2011)
- Former channel numbers: Analog: 47 (UHF, 1979–2011); Digital: 64 (UHF, 200?–2011), 47 (UHF, 2011–2020)
- Former affiliations: Multicultural independent (1979–2002)
- Call sign meaning: "Canada's First Multilingual Television"

Technical information
- Licensing authority: CRTC
- ERP: 16 kW
- HAAT: 506 m (1,660 ft)
- Transmitter coordinates: 43°38′33″N 79°23′14″W
- Translator(s): see § Transmitters

Links
- Website: Omni Television Ontario

CFMT-DT (channel 47, cable channel 4) is a television station in Toronto, Ontario, Canada. It is one of two flagship stations of the Canadian multilingual network Omni Television, a division of Rogers Sports & Media, and is operated alongside sister Omni outlet CJMT-DT (channel 40) and Citytv flagship CITY-DT (channel 57). The three stations share studios at the Rogers Building in downtown Toronto; CFMT-DT's transmitter is located atop the CN Tower.

The station was originally founded on September 3, 1979, by a consortium led by Dan Iannuzzi, Jerry Grafstein, Raymond Moriyama, Steve Stavro, Garth Drabinsky and Nat Taylor as CFMT-TV, branded "MTV" (Multilingual Television) as Canada's first multicultural independent station and in 1980, CFMT became Canada's first television station to air 24 hours a day, seven days a week. The station has been owned by Rogers Communications since 1986, but later used CFMT as the basis and flagship station to expand its multicultural stations under the Omni brand beginning with the launch of CJMT-TV (Omni.2) in 2002 along with the rebranding of CFMT as Omni.1 and the rest of Canada in subsequent years. The two stations are distinguished by their service of different cultural groups; CFMT caters primarily on European (particularly Western and Eastern) and Latin American cultures while CJMT focuses on Asian cultures (including programming in South Asian and Chinese languages).

== History ==
CFMT-TV's logo until September 15, 2002.

Omni.1 logo used from 2002 to 2011.

Omni Television logo used from 2011 to 2018.

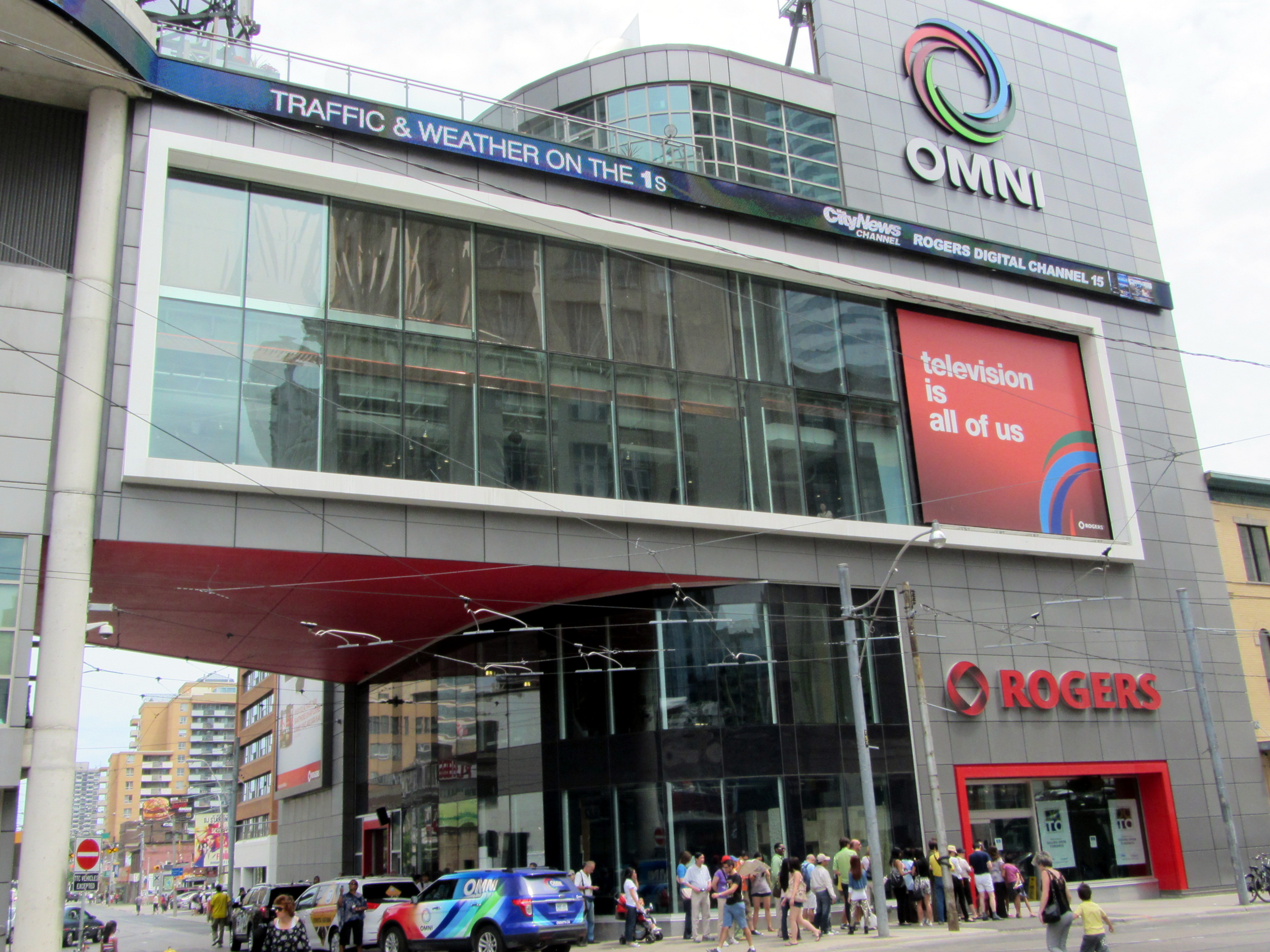
Omni Television's studios at the Rogers Media Complex on 33 Dundas Street East facing Sankofa Square in Toronto, used from 2009 to 2025

In December 1978, Dan Iannuzzi, founder of the Italian-language daily newspaper Corriere Canadese and future recipient of the Order of Canada, received a licence to operate a multilingual television station, defeating rival applicants Johnny Lombardi and Leon Kossar. His company, Multilingual Television (Toronto) Ltd., had been producing multilingual television programs since 1972. Iannuzzi initially owned 30% of the station, and other investors included Jerry Grafstein (who was also one of the major investors that helped launch CITY-TV in September 1972), Raymond Moriyama, Steve Stavro, Garth Drabinsky and Nat Taylor. The call letters CFMT were derived from "Canada's First Multilingual Television", as it was the first multicultural television station in Canada. English-language programming was limited to one-third of the station's broadcast hours, with French-language programming accounting for 7% and programming in about two dozen other languages providing the remaining 60%. The station was originally going to broadcast on UHF channel 45, but instead moved to channel 47 for technical reasons. The station first signed on the air on September 3, 1979, broadcasting 24 hours a day, seven days a week, as a multicultural independent station under the brand name "MTV" (for "Multilingual Television"); that branding was dropped in 1981 to avoid confusion with the upstart American MTV cable network. (The channel even broadcast a program called Video Singles, as of 1983.)

In August 1980, the channel became the first in Canada to adopt a 24-hour, seven-day a week schedule, introducing The All-Night Show three weeks later. On May 20, 1988, it acquired 100% of cable channel Telelatino.

In the past, CFMT-TV identified itself on air as "Channel 47/Cable 4" (reflecting both its over-the-air channel number and its cable channel in the Greater Toronto Area through Rogers Cable) and later as "CFMT International". On September 16, 2002, Rogers launched CJMT-TV (channel 40, which was branded as "OMNI.2") to provide additional multicultural programming, and rebranded CFMT as "OMNI.1". Programs airing on CFMT that were aimed at Asian and African communities were moved to CJMT, while CFMT kept programs aimed at European and Latin American groups.

On October 8, 2007, Rogers announced that the operations of the two Omni stations would relocate from 545 Lake Shore Boulevard West to 33 Dundas Street East. CFMT and CJMT integrated their operations into the building – sharing with Citytv flagship CITY-DT, which had moved into the facility the previous month – on October 19, 2009.

Omni Television and Citytv moved their operations to the Rogers Building at Bloor and Mount Pleasant in March 2025.

== Programming ==
The station broadcasts multicultural programming targeting European and Latin American communities throughout Southern Ontario. Historically, among English-speaking television viewers in the region, CFMT was best known as home to various English-language syndicated talk shows and sitcom repeats, including The Simpsons, Friends and Family Guy, airing nightly as counterprogramming to local newscasts and first-run prime time series on owned-and-operated stations of the major networks.

Until around 1990, CFMT was the original Toronto home of Wheel of Fortune and Jeopardy!. At that time, both game shows moved to CTV flagship station CFTO-TV (channel 9) and remained on that station until 2004, when Wheel of Fortune moved to CJMT, then moved back to CFMT the following year; Barrie station CKVR-TV carried the show in 2006. Jeopardy! remained on CFTO-TV for a few years until 2008, when CBC Television acquired the Canadian television rights to the game shows, moving once again to CBC flagship station CBLT (channel 5) until 2012, when both programs moved to independent station CHCH-DT (channel 11) in Hamilton.

=== Newscasts ===
CFMT-DT presently broadcasts five hours of locally produced newscasts each week (with one hour each weekday). The station currently carries a local newscast aimed at Southern Ontario's Italian demographic. CFMT previously produced a Cantonese newscast; that program was moved to CJMT after that station launched on September 16, 2002. The station previously carried newsbreaks produced by sister radio station CFTR in the early 1990s.

== Technical information ==
=== Subchannel ===
Subchannel of CFMT-DT
Subchannel	Res.	Short name	Programming
47.1	1080i	OMNI 1	Omni Television

=== Analog-to-digital conversion ===
CFMT shut down its analog signal, over UHF channel 47, on August 31, 2011, the official date on which full-power television stations in larger Canadian television markets transitioned from analog to digital broadcasts under federal mandate. The station's digital signal relocated from its pre-transition UHF channel 64, which was among the high band UHF channels (52–69) that were removed from broadcasting use as a result of the transition, to UHF channel 47 for post-transition operations. CFMT's digital repeaters in London and Ottawa also relocated to new channels for the same reason behind the relocation of the main signal; these repeaters would use their former UHF analog channel numbers (69 and 60) as their virtual channel numbers.

=== Transmitters ===
Station	City of licence	Channel (RF / VC)	ERP	HAAT	Transmitter coordinates
CFMT-DT-1	London	29 (UHF); 69	17.3 kW	201 m (659 ft)	42°57′16″N 81°21′17″W
CFMT-DT-2	Ottawa	27 (UHF); 60	15 kW	202.3 m (664 ft)	45°13′2″N 75°33′49″W
