= Univision Canada =

Canadian Spanish language TV channel

- Country: Canada
- Broadcast area: National
- Headquarters: Toronto, Ontario

Programming
- Language(s): Spanish
- Picture format: 1080i HDTV (downscaled to letterboxed 480i for the SDTV feed)

Ownership
- Owner: TLN Media Group; Joseph Vitale (28%); R. Di Battista Investments (24%); I.P. Rosati Holdings (24%); Aldo Di Felice (24%) (branding licensed from TelevisaUnivision)

History
- Launched: October 23, 2007; 17 years ago
- Former names: TLN en Español (2007-2014)

Links
- Website: univision.ca

Univision Canada is a Canadian Spanish language specialty channel owned by TLN Media Group, in partnership with TelevisaUnivision, the leading Spanish-language media company in the United States. Univision Canada broadcasts a variety of programming, including news, dramas, talk shows, sports, and more.

== History ==
In September 2006, Telelatino Network was granted approval from the Canadian Radio-television and Telecommunications Commission (CRTC) to launch a television channel called Spanish Entertainment TV 1, described as "a national, ethnic Category 2 specialty programming service devoted to the Spanish-speaking community with a particular emphasis on programming of interest to female and youth audiences."

The channel launched on October 23, 2007 as TLN en Español.

TLN en Español logo from October 23, 2007 until May 4, 2014

On January 28, 2014, Corus announced that they would rebrand the network Univision Canada after reaching a brand licensing agreement with their long-term partner, Univision Communications, which had no presence of their main American network in Canada aside from fringe receptions of then-Seattle Univision affiliate KUNS-TV into the Vancouver market and Cleveland, Ohio owned-and-operated station WQHS-DT into parts of the London, Ontario market (Seattle is now served by Bellingham-licensed KVOS-TV). The channel officially switched over to Univision Canada on May 5, 2014.

On May 31, 2016, Univision Canada launched on Cogeco.

== Programming ==
Univision Canada airs programming from Univision, the most popular Spanish-language television network in the United States. It also airs programming from UniMás and TUDN. Unlike Univision in the United States, Univision Canada does not air programming from TelevisaUnivision's Mexican network, Las Estrellas, as that network is available on selected cable systems in Canada.

The service also produces and airs select documentary films and live entertainment specials created specifically for the Spanish-language community in Canada, as well as the community newsmagazine series Nash.

=== Noted series ===
- Aqui y Ahora
- Despierta America
- El Gordo y la Flaca
- Latin Angels
- Noticiero Univision
- Primer Impacto
- Contacto Deportivo
- Cine en Familia

== See also ==
- Univision
- UniMás
- TUDN
