= Dan Iannuzzi =

Canadian newspaper publisher (1934–2004)

Daniel Andrèa Iannuzzi, CM OOnt (February 24, 1934 – November 20, 2004) was a Canadian entrepreneur, journalist, and broadcaster.

A third generation Italian Canadian, Iannuzzi was born in Montreal. At the age of 18 he enrolled with the Canadian Grenadier Guards, and two years later, in 1954, he moved to Toronto. Here, together with Arturo Scotti, he founded the Italian-Canadian newspaper Corriere Canadese, a daily publication serving the Italian-Canadian community, on 2 June 1954 (Republic Day). The publication is distributed exclusively in Ontario and Quebec. He produced multilingual TV programs for Toronto's Citytv from 1972 to 1979 and in 1979, he launched the world's first multilingual television station, CFMT-TV (today OMNI 1), initially broadcasting in 24 languages. For ten years, Dan Iannuzzi served as President and Executive Producer for the station.

In 1977 he was given the Canadian Family Man Award from the League of Human Rights. In 1979, he was awarded the City of Toronto Achievement Award and the Ontario Bicentennial Medal in 1984. He was nominated at the EXPO ’86 Award for Excellence and Contribution in pioneering multicultural communications. In 1987 he was named "Man of the Year" by the Canadian Italian Business and Professional Association. In 1989, he was admitted into the Order of Ontario. In 1990, he was made a Member of the Order of Canada for being "a pioneer in multicultural communications and a significant contributor to Toronto's Italian community". He was also a Knight Commander in the Order of Malta.

Through his ownership of Multimedia Nova Corporation he owned and published the following community newspapers throughout the Greater Toronto Area and in Quebec:

- Town Crier Community Newspapers
- Corriere Canadese (Italian language)
- Tandem magazine (English language newspaper for the children of Italian immigrants)
- Correo Canadiense (Spanish language)
- O Correio Canadiano Nove Ilhas (Portuguese language)
- Insieme (Italian language)

He died in Rome while on a business trip following a cardiac arrest.
