= Mediaset Italia (Canadian TV channel) =

- Country: Canada
- Broadcast area: National
- Headquarters: Toronto, Ontario

Programming
- Picture format: 480i SDTV

Ownership
- Owner: TLN Media Group; Joseph Vitale (28%); R. Di Battista Investments (24%); I.P. Rosati Holdings (24%); Aldo Di Felice (24%) Mediaset; MFE - MediaForEurope (original channel)
- Sister channels: TGCOM24

History
- Launched: June 2010

Links
- Website: mediasetitalia.ca

Mediaset Italia is a Canadian Italian language specialty channel owned by TLN Media Group. It broadcasts programming from Canale 5, a television channel from Italy and local Canadian content.

Mediaset Italia Canada was licensed by the CRTC on September 6, 2006 as Italian Entertainment TV.

Mediaset Italia is the international service of Mediaset, the largest private broadcaster in Italy, founded in the 1970s by former Italian prime minister Silvio Berlusconi and still controlled today with a 38.6% stake by his family holding company Fininvest (via MFE - MediaForEurope), it features programming from Mediaset's three channels: Canale 5, Italia 1 and Rete 4.

Mediaset Italia airs top rated entertainment programming including comedies, dramas, reality shows as well as news and current affairs programs.

On April 2, 2014, Mediaset Italia launched on Bell Satellite TV and Bell Fibe TV. On May 31, 2016, Mediaset Italia launched on Cogeco.

== See also ==
- TLN
- Mediaset Italia
