= 1996 CONCACAF Gold Cup final =

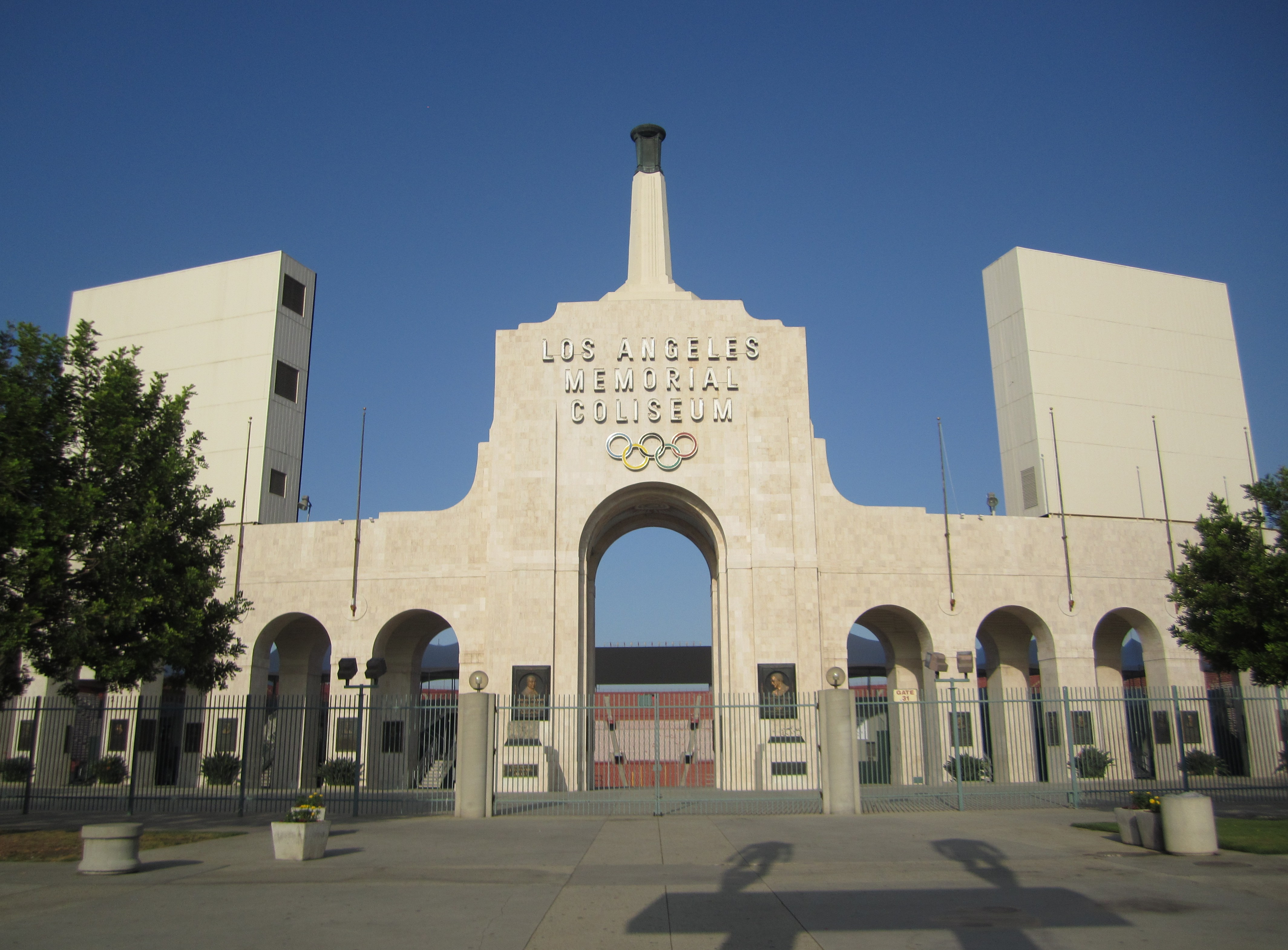
- The Los Angeles Memorial Coliseum hosted the final.
- Event: 1996 CONCACAF Gold Cup
Brazil	Mexico
(Brazil)	(Mexico)
0	2
- Date: January 21, 1996
- Venue: Los Angeles Memorial Coliseum, Los Angeles
- Referee: Ramesh Ramdhan (Trinidad and Tobago)
- Attendance: 88,155

The 1996 CONCACAF Gold Cup final was a soccer match to determine the winners of the 1996 CONCACAF Gold Cup. The match was held at the Los Angeles Memorial Coliseum in Los Angeles, United States, on January 21, 1996, and was contested by the winners of the semi-finals, Brazil and Mexico. Mexico, who had won 1993 CONCACAF Gold Cup, successfully defended their title with a 2–0 win over Brazil. As Gold Cup champions, Mexico earned a berth into the 1997 FIFA Confederations Cup in Saudi Arabia as the representative from CONCACAF.

The final was Mexico's second in Gold Cup history, while it was Brazil's first final, and the first for a non-CONCACAF team to be invited for the tournament and make it to the final.

== Route to the final ==
Brazil
Round
Mexico
Opponents
Result
Group stage
Opponents
Result
Canada
4–1
Match 1
Saint Vincent and the Grenadines
5–0
Honduras
5–0
Match 2
Guatemala
1–0
Group B winners

Pos	Team	Pld	Pts
1	Brazil	2	6
2	Canada	2	3
3	Honduras	2	0

Final standings
Group A winners

Pos	Team	Pld	Pts
1	Mexico	2	6
2	Guatemala	2	3
3	Saint Vincent and the Grenadines	2	0

Opponents
Result
Knockout stage
Opponents
Result
United States
1–0
Semi-finals
Guatemala
1–0

== Match ==
=== Details ===
21 January 1996

Brazil	0–2	Mexico
	Report	L. García 54'; Blanco 75'

Los Angeles Memorial Coliseum, Los Angeles
Attendance: 88,155
Referee: Ramesh Ramdhan (Trinidad and Tobago)

Brazil	Mexico

GK	1	Dida
DF	2	Zé Maria
DF	13	Carlinhos	(yellow card) 80'
DF	4	Narciso
DF	6	André Luiz	(red card) 80'
MF	10	Arílson	(yellow card) 20'	(substituted off) 68'
MF	8	Amaral	(yellow card) 37'
MF	5	Flavio Conceição
MF	11	Sávio
FW	7	Caio
FW	18	Paulo Jamelli		(substituted off) 64'
Substitutes:
FW	20	Leandro Machado		(substituted on) 64'
MF	16	Zé Elias		(substituted on) 68'
Manager:
(Brazil) Mario Zagallo

GK	19	Jorge Campos
RB	21	Raúl Gutiérrez	(yellow card) 35'
CB	2	Claudio Suárez
CB	5	Duilio Davino
LB	14	Joaquín del Olmo		(substituted off) 90'
RM	8	Alberto Garcia Aspe	(yellow card) 20'
CM	17	Germán Villa
CM	6	Raúl Lara	(yellow card) 73'
LM	7	Ramón Ramírez
RF	15	Cuauhtémoc Blanco	(yellow card) 22'	(substituted off) 82'
LF	10	Luis García
Substitutes:
LF	11	Luis Hernández		(substituted on) 82'
RF	9	Ricardo Peláez		(substituted on) 90'
Manager:
(Federal Republic of Yugoslavia) Bora Milutinović
