= Frank G. Paci =

- Born: Frank G. Paci; 1948 (age 77–78); Pesaro, Italy
- Occupations: Writer, Teacher
- Writing career
- Genre: Italian-Canadian literature
- Notable works: The Italians, Black Madonna

Frank G. Paci is an Italian-Canadian novelist and former teacher who lives in the Toronto area. He has published 13 books under the name F.G. Paci.

== Biography ==
He was born in Pesaro, Italy, 1948, and immigrated to Canada with his parents in 1952 where they settled down in Sault Ste. Marie, Ontario. His education includes a B.A. in English and B.Ed. from the University of Toronto. He also received an M.A in English from Carleton University in 1980.

== Works ==
Some of Paci's books are: The Italians, 1978; Black Madonna, 1982; The Father, 1984; Iceland (1999), and Losers (2002). His first novel, The Italians, which appeared in 1978 became a Canadian bestseller and was shortlisted for the Books in Canada First Novel Award in 1979. His books focus on Canadian-Italian characters, issues of identity and creativity. He helped create the phenomenon of Canadian-Italian literature.

In 1991 Paci began his multi-novel Bildungsroman focused on Mark Trecroci with Black Blood and Under the Bridge. The psychological study of the development of the young writer/artist continued with Sex and Character, The Rooming-House (1996). Mark returns to Italy in Italian Shoes. New York and Paris are the settings for Hard Edge, and Ottawa for Peace Tower (2009). The last novel in the series, so far, is The Son (2011). In addition to 13 novels Paci has also published two collections of short stories, Playing to Win (2012), and Talk About God and Other Stories (2016).

Black Blood is a novel in the guise of the fictional character's memoirs, Marco Trecroci (Italian for Mark Threecrosses), that he keeps as his confession and his way to pay for his juvenile sins. The novel tells the story of Marco from his childhood to his mature age. The protagonist is a kid born in Italy and raised in Canada who, led astray by the North American way of life, has intentionally abandoned his parents' world, losing his roots. The world of Black Blood and Under the Bridge is the same working class, ethnic enclave in Sault Ste. Marie's west end which we had encountered in Paci's previous novels. A world dominated by an oppressive Roman Catholic education, sexual repression, conflicts between emigrant parents and their Canadian educated children, rivalries among boys and girls, and child gangs fighting each other.

In 2003, critic Joseph Pivato edited the collection of studies, F.G. Paci: Essays on His Works. The collected of essays described each of his novels and gives brief details on his background and style of writing. In a book review called "Italian Identity" author Giovanni Bonanno describes, "Part of Paci's success in the novel lies in his ability to manoeuver the reader's sympathies for certain characters and for what they stand for". He also states Paci's way of describing Italy throughout The Father is very well done. Paci's work focuses on Italian immigrant families in Northern Ontario.

In the Oxford Companion to Canadian Literature, Pivato describes him as "the most important Italian-Canadian novelist writing in English, both because of the number of his publications and the consistent quality of his writing".

Frank Paci has demonstrated a sustained commitment to his art and a determination both to enunciate his own history and to provide a voice for those around him so often characterized by silence. In so doing, he has enriched the fabric of our national literature and mapped out and testified to a previously unexpressed dimension of the culture of Sault Ste. Marie.

The Canadian Press interviewed him on his honorary Doctor of Letters which he received in 2003, and he simply thinks of himself as a very invisible and "on the margin" writer. In 1984 he was invited to Rome for the first conference on Italian-Canadian writing and history.

In 1988–1989 he became the first writer to hold the Mariano A. Elia Chair in Italian-Canadian Studies at York University. Paci is currently married, has a son and lives in Mississauga, Ontario where he retired from teaching in 2008.
