= Telebimbi =

Canadian Italian-language television channel

- TeleBimbi logo
- Country: Canada
- Broadcast area: National
- Headquarters: Toronto, Ontario, Canada

Programming
- Picture format: 480i (SDTV)

Ownership
- Owner: TLN Media Group
- Sister channels: TLN; TeleNiños

History
- Launched: December 4, 2014

Links
- Website: Telebimbi

Telebimbi is a Canadian Category B-exempt Italian language specialty channel owned by TLN Media Group. Telebimbi broadcasts programming primarily aimed at children in addition to select family-oriented programming.

== History ==
In October 2011, TLN Media Group, at the time a consortium majority owned by Corus Entertainment, was granted approval from the Canadian Radio-television and Telecommunications Commission (CRTC) to launch a television channel called All Italian Children’s Television, described as "a national, niche third-language ethnic specialty Category B service devoted to providing programming to Canadians with origins in Italy or who are of Italian descent, and who are from preschool age to seventeen years of age.

The channel launched on December 4, 2014, as Telebimbi, exclusively on Bell Fibe TV. On May 31, 2016, Telebimbi launched on Cogeco. On August 31, 2017, Telebimbi launched on Rogers.

As of February 11, 2019, it and sister channel TeleNiños have operated under exempt status. Shortly after, Corus sold its stake in Telelatino Network to the other co-owners.
