= Corriere Canadese =

Italian-language Canadian newspaper

- Founder: Dan Iannuzzi
- Publisher: Joe Volpe
- Editor-in-chief: Francesco Veronesi
- Founded: 2 June 1954
- Ceased publication: May 2013
- Relaunched: November 2013
- Language: Italian
- Sister newspapers: Tandem
- ISSN: 0045-866X
- Website: www.corriere.ca

Corriere Canadese ("The Canadian Courier") is an Italian-language daily newspaper published in Toronto, Ontario, Canada. The publication is distributed exclusively in Ontario and Quebec, primarily throughout the Greater Toronto and the Greater Montreal areas.

Corriere Canadese was founded on 2 June 1954 (Republic Day) by Dan Iannuzzi, and since 2001 was owned by Multimedia Nova Corporation and published by Italmedia. In 1995, it launched Tandem, an English-language, weekend edition of Corriere Canadese targeting children of Italian immigrants.

The newspaper suspended publication in May 2013 blaming a 2010 cut in subsidies by the Italian government for its financial difficulty. In July, M.T.E.C. Consultants, a group of Italo-Canadian entrepreneurs, acquired the assets of Corriere Canadese and Tandem. The former federal minister Joe Volpe is the new publisher, Francesco Veronesi the new editor in chief.

Corriere published a series of 28 articles by Volpe between October 17, 2020, and January 8, 2021, attacking the Toronto Catholic District School Board and the LGBT YouthLine program, according to the Ontario Superior Court in Volpe v. Wong-Tam, 3106 (ONSC 2022). The program was removed from the TCDSB website, then reinstated shortly after. Volpe and M.T.E.C. brought a $30 million lawsuit against city councilors Kristyn Wong-Tam and Paul Ainslie, as well as four TCDSB trustees who supported YouthLine, and reporter Elizabeth di Filippo who noted his "well documented anti-LGBTQ+ views." The lawsuit was dismissed as a SLAPP. Volpe and M.T.E.C. were ordered to pay the defendants' legal costs.

== See also ==
- List of newspapers in Canada
- Media in Toronto
- Joe Volpe
