= Corriere Italiano =

Italian-language daily newspaper

- Founder: Alfredo Gagliardi
- Founded: 1952
- Language: Italian
- Website: www.corriereitaliano.com

Corriere Italiano (English: Italian Courier) is an Italian-language weekly (c.gagliardi ex-editorù) newspaper published in Montreal, Quebec.

The Corriere Italiano was founded by Alfredo Gagliardi, president of the Italian Order of Sons of Italy in Canada, in Montreal in the early 1950s, for the Italian community.

Through his newspaper, he defended the interests of the Italian Canadians and started the great battles for the recognition of the contribution that the Italian community gave to the development and progress of Canada in all fields. The Corriere Italiano has always remained outside the ideologies and colors of politics. One of the great battles sustained by the newspaper for years has been the linguistic one: for the maintenance of bilingualism in Quebec, and in Montreal in particular.

Corriere Italiano was bilingual (English-Italian) at the time of its foundation but is now only Italian.

Currently< the newspaper is published weekly, every Thursday, enabling the Italian in Montreal area to have weekly news in the Italian Language.

The newspaper is published by MetroMedia. The director is Patrick Marsan and the deputy director is Fabrizio Stoppino.

== See also ==
- List of newspapers in Canada
- Media in Montreal
