= TLN (TV channel) =

Canadian Hispanic and Italian culture TV channel

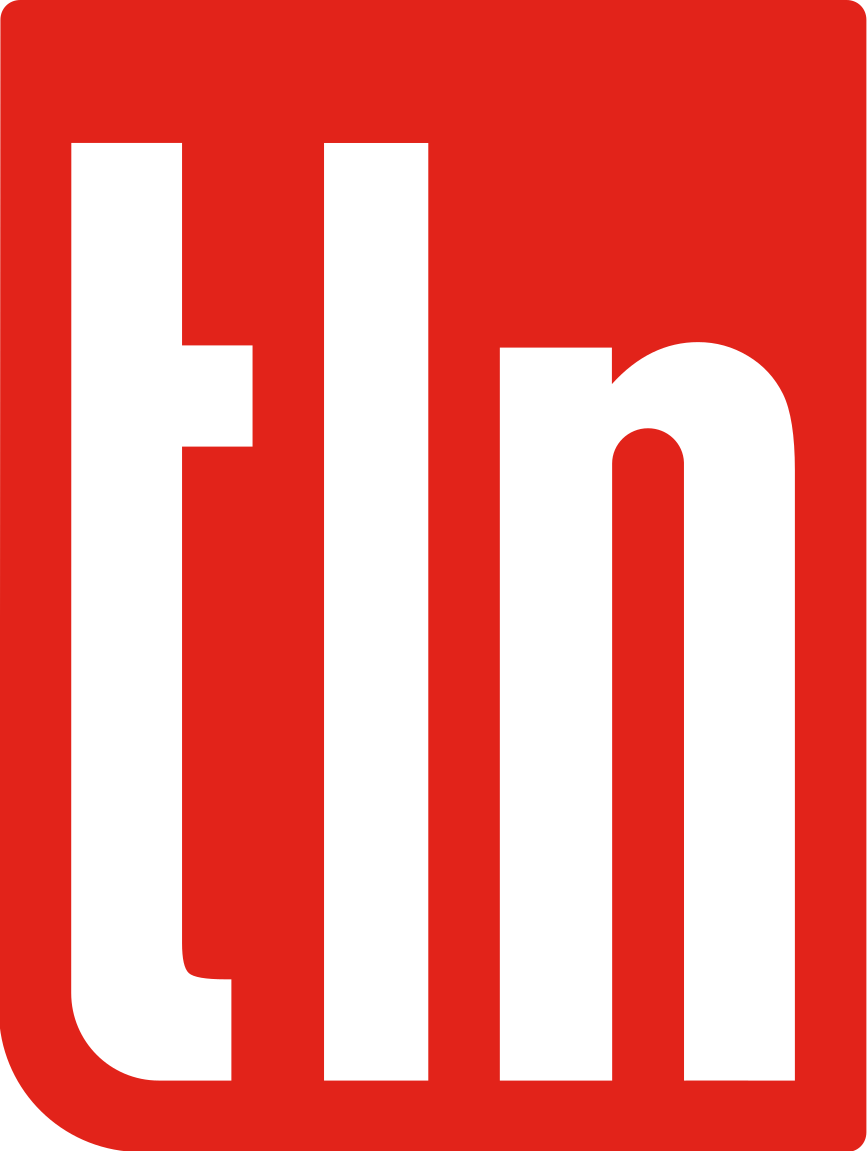
- Country: Canada
- Broadcast area: National
- Headquarters: Toronto, Ontario

Programming
- Language: English
- Picture format: 1080i HDTV (2012-present); 480i SDTV (1984-present)
- Timeshift service: East; West

Ownership
- Owner: TLN Media Group; Joseph Vitale (28%); R. Di Battista Investments (24%); I.P. Rosati Holdings (24%); Aldo Di Felice (24%)
- Sister channels: Goal TV, Mediaset Italia, TGCOM 24, Telebimbi, TeleNiños, Univision Canada

History
- Launched: October 2, 1984

Links
- Website: TLN

TLN (an abbreviation from its full name Telelatino) is a Canadian English-language discretionary specialty channel owned by TLN Media Group. The channel primarily broadcasts lifestyle programming surrounding the Spanish and Italian cultures, including cooking and travel-related programs, as well as coverage of international soccer, and mainstream television series and films.

Launched on October 2, 1984, TLN was originally a consortium of Joseph Vitale, Organización de Telecomunicaciones de Iberoamérica, Canwest, and CHUM Limited. In 1994, Shaw Communications acquired CHUM Limited's stake in the service, and in 1999, Aldo Di Felice acquired Canwest's shares in the service, while Shaw's media assets were spun off to form Corus Entertainment the same year. In 2009, I.P. Rosati Holdings acquired OTI's shares in the service; in 2019, Corus sold its stake in the service to its existing partners and Di Felice.

TLN previously broadcast in a trilingual format, carrying programming in the Italian, Spanish, and English languages (with the latter usually focusing on off-network reruns of entertainment programs starring actors of Italian or Spanish descent). This format was later phased out with the launch of sister digital cable channels dedicated solely to Italian- and Spanish-language programs; subsequently, TLN relaunched in 2018 with a larger focus on English-language lifestyle programming relating to Italian and Spanish cuisine, culture, and travel.

== History ==
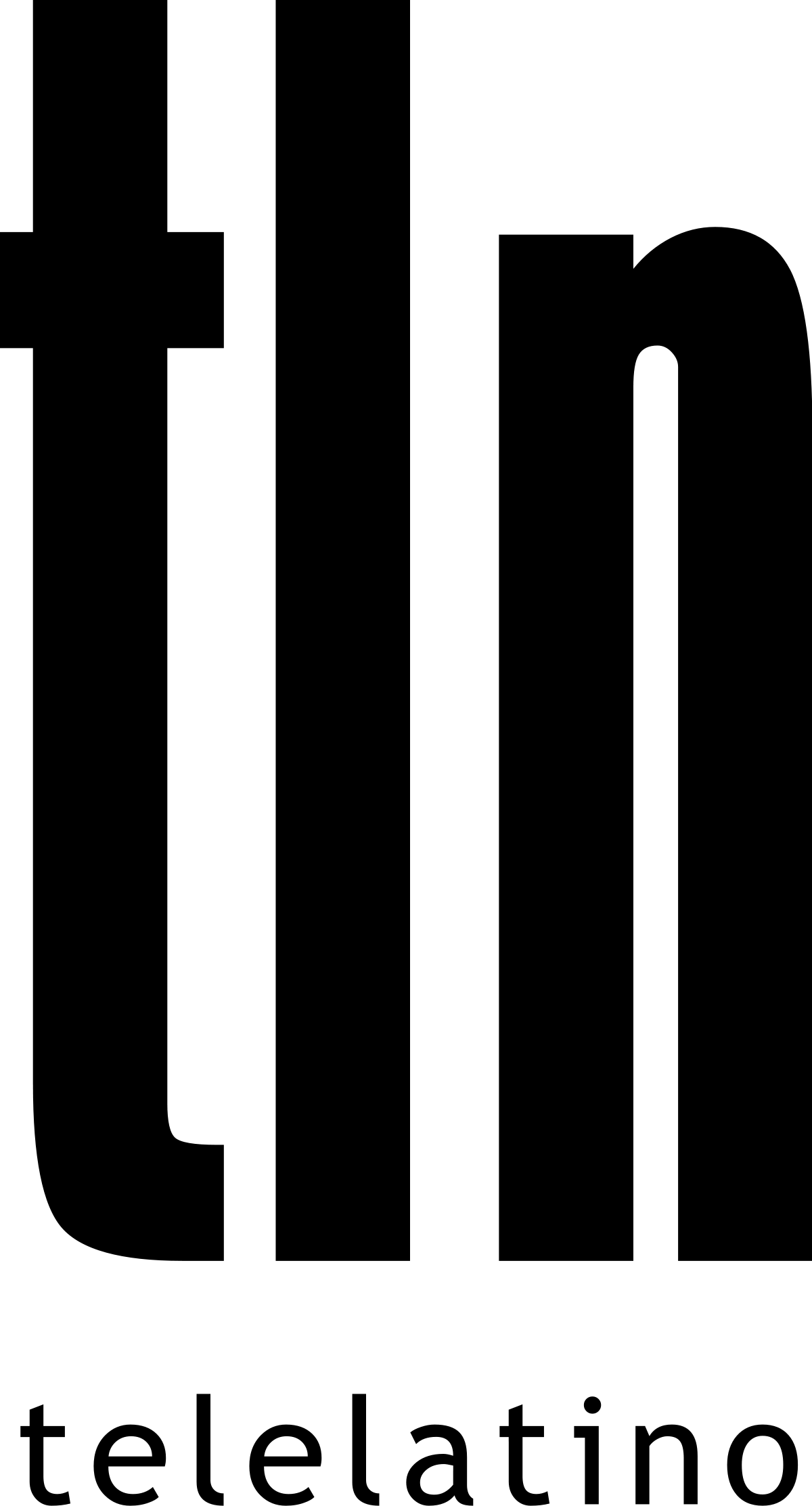
TLN's second logo, used from 2002 to 2015. Later on, an oblong shape was added to the logo.

TLN was licensed by the CRTC on April 2, 1984, to TLN Media Group, at the time owned by Joseph Vitale, Organización de Telecomunicaciones de Iberoamérica CHUM Limited and Canwest, along with that of MuchMusic (also owned by CHUM Limited); the channel was launched on October 2, 1984, as Telelatino, broadcasting a trilingual format, focusing on Italian, Spanish and English programming. Initially available only in Ontario, the channel had 16,725 as of November 1985. An early success included the telecast of Italian League matches coming in from RAI packages, which it stole from CFMT (both parties were accused of siphoning; by October 1986, it ascended to over 23,000 subscribers. On March 29, 1987, the channel unscrambled its signal to deliver a telethon to raise funds for an earthquake that damaged Ecuador earlier that month.

On May 20, 1988, it was announced that Multilingual Television, operator of CFMT, would acquire 100% of Telelatino. Consequently, the network's president and founder Emilio Mascia would become a part of MTV's board of directors, as well as producing Italian-language programming for the Toronto station. The network failed to penetrate into the Montreal area, which had the second largest Italian community in Canada, after Toronto. On September 1, Telelatino expanded its coverage to Montreal on CF Cable TV. Up until then, RAI programs were distributed by Telelatino to Tele Italia on said sable system; Italian communities in Montreal contested the decision, especially among the elderly who couldn't afford a TLN subscription. In December, it received a warning from the CRTC due to failing to meet its Canadian content commitments; the regulator renewed its licence for only five months and not five years on the grounds that it failed the 10% Canadian content targets; in 1986, this figure was of just 3,3%. Rogers bid for acquiring the network in March 1989 and announced it would axe all Spanish-language programs; keeping such programs would weaken the network according to Rogers, but the CRTC challenged them. The plan was rejected on July 28.

Six investors announced their plan to acquire 51% of the channel in July 1990, with Emilio Mascia keeping the remaining 49%. One of the investors, Daniel Ianuzzi, owner of Corriere Canadese, said that the line-up would be revised in the fall and was considering expanding into Portuguese and Greek programming, and received a permit from the CRTC to increase its advertising limit from three minutes to eight.

In 1994, Shaw Communications acquired CHUM Limited's stake in TLN. In November 1997, it launched as a charter channel on ExpressVu as a "pick and pay" option. In 1999, Aldo Di Felice acquired Canwest Global Communications' shares in TLN, and the assets of Shaw were spun off to form Corus Entertainment.

In 2000, TLN entered negotiations with RAI to apply for a digital network, Rai Canada.

Beginning in 2004, the channel started airing Everybody Loves Raymond, on the grounds that its main character, played by Ray Romano, was of Italian ancestry. The series had become Telelatino's most successful show; the CRTC, in order for the channel to feature more English-language programming, decided that it should include content in which the main actors or characters were of Spanish or Italian descent; part of this owed to the upcoming increase in foreign language channels.

On October 23, 2007, TLN launched TLN en Español, a Category B Spanish language general entertainment channel. The channel would later be relaunched as Univision Canada in 2014. In 2009, Organización de Telecomunicaciones de Iberoamérica traded its stake in TLN to I.P. Rosati Holdings for $57 million. In 2011, the channel started to refer itself to as TLN on-air.

In 2015, TLN was given a graphical overhaul, introducing an updated wordmark over a red background, and a new lineup with a greater focus on lifestyle Italian and Spanish programming.

In April 2018, the network introduced a new marketing campaign, Colour Your Life, to signal a shift in focus for the channel to include "all lovers of the mainstream cultural lifestyle" in addition to existing viewers, after having phased out its foreign-language programs in favour of more lifestyle programming relevant to Italian and Spanish culture.

Corus Entertainment previously owned a 50.5% majority share in the service; it later sold its interest to its existing partners and Di Felice for $19 million in 2019.

== Programming ==
The network primarily airs programming related to Italian and Spanish cultures, including travel and cuisine.

TLN broadcasts a substantial amount of soccer programming, airing Serie A matches since 1984. TLN later secured the rights to air all Serie A matches between 2018 and 2021. and UEFA Champions League matches involving Italian and Spanish teams from 2002 to 2009. In 2009, TLN secured the rights to the UEFA Europa League to become the exclusive Canadian broadcaster of this tournament through to 2012.

For the 1990 FIFA World Cup, the channel aired two matches a day without commercial breaks. In 2006, TLN partnered with CBC Sports to sub-license its rights to FIFA tournaments, including the 2010 and 2014 FIFA World Cup. In 2015, TLN also sub-licensed Spanish-language rights to the 2015 Pan American Games in Toronto from CBC, collaborating with the U.S. Spanish rightsholder ESPN Deportes.

=== Controversy with RAI ===
From its inception up until mid-2003, TLN's Italian programming was derived primarily from RAI, Italy's state owned broadcaster, which made a commitment in 1984 to supply programming to Canada through TLN for as long as TLN was licensed in Canada. A dispute arose in 2003 when the head of RAI's international channel, decided to repudiate RAI's supply obligations as well as its 2001 agreement to launch a 24-hour RAI Canada channel, in favour of challenging Canada's regulatory regime by indicating that it wanted to deliver RAI programming through its own international channel on its own terms without restriction and not through TLN or through any Canadian programming partner.

In 2003, RAI pulled its content from TLN and petitioned the Canadian Radio-television and Telecommunications Commission (CRTC) to allow it to broadcast RAI International in Canada. This effort was backed by Rogers Communications, who sponsored RAI's application to get on the CRTC's approved list. After initially being rejected by the CRTC in 2004 in strong terms, RAI International was eventually approved by the CRTC in the spring of 2005 and began broadcasting in June 2005. After RAI International was launched in Canada, TLN began airing programming from Mediaset.

== TLN Media Group ==
TLN is the flagship television network of the TLN Media Group, a consortium owned by three prominent Italian Canadian families and network president Aldo Di Felice, that is dedicated to multi-ethnic programming. In addition to TLN, the company also owns the following television assets:

- Goal TV – A sports network launched in July 2010 focusing mainly on association football and sports-related programming. It originally launched as EuroWorld Sport but was re-branded as Goal TV in 2025.
- Mediaset Italia – Launched in June 2010 and mainly broadcasts Italian programming from Mediaset Italia.
- TGCOM24 – A Canadian version of the Italian Mediaset TGCOM 24 news channel. It was originally launched on June 15, 2005, as a simulcast of Sky Italia's Sky TG24 channel. It rebranded under its current name in December 2016.
- Telebimbi – An offshoot of TeleNiños, a children's channel dedicated to Italian-language programming.
- TeleNiños – A children's channel launched in 2011, focusing mainly on Spanish-language programming.
- Univision Canada – A wholly owned Spanish-language entertainment channel, with the Univision name used under a brand licensing agreement with the U.S-based TelevisaUnivision.
