= List of broadcasting licences held by Ethnic Channels Group =

The following is a list of broadcasting licences for Category 2 Digital channels held by Ethnic Channels Group:

== Launched (On the air) ==
- 5 Kanal (Operates as exempt Cat. B Ethnic service)
- Aaj Tak (Hindi News)
- Abu Dhabi TV (Operates as exempt Cat. B Ethnic service)
- Al-Nahar TV (Operates as exempt Cat. B Ethnic service)
- Al-Nahar Drama (Operates as exempt Cat. B Ethnic service)
- Al-Resalah (Operates as exempt Cat. B Ethnic service)
- AMedia (Operates as exempt Cat. B Ethnic service)
- BBC Arabic (Operates as exempt Cat. B Ethnic service)
- beIN Sports (Operates as exempt Cat. B Ethnic service)
- Big Magic International (Hindi TV)
- CTC International (Operates as exempt Cat. B Ethnic service)
- Detskiy Kids (Operates as exempt Cat. B Ethnic service)
- Dream 2 (Operates as exempt Cat. B Ethnic service)
- FTV (Operates as exempt Cat. B Ethnic service)
- First National (Operates as exempt Cat. B Ethnic service)
- Greek Music Channel (Operates as exempt Cat. B Ethnic service)
- HRT Sat (Operates as exempt Cat. B Ethnic service)
- Hum TV (Operates as exempt Cat. B Ethnic service)
- Iran TV Network (Operates as exempt Cat. B Ethnic service)
- The Israeli Network (Operates as exempt Cat. B Ethnic service)
- KHL-TV HD (Operates as exempt Cat. B Ethnic service)
- Melody Aflam (Operates as exempt Cat. B Ethnic service)
- Melody Drama (Operates as exempt Cat. B Ethnic service)
- Melody Hits (Operates as exempt Cat. B Ethnic service)
- Momo Kids (Operates as exempt Cat. B Ethnic service)
- NGTV (Operates as exempt Cat. B Ethnic service)
- Nova World (Operates as exempt Cat. B Ethnic service)
- OSN Ya Hala International (Operates as exempt Cat. B Ethnic service)
- ProSiebenSat.1 Welt (Operates as exempt Cat. B Ethnic service)
- Rawal TV (Operates as exempt Cat. B Ethnic service)
- RBTi (Operates as exempt Cat. B Ethnic service)
- Rotana+ (Operates as exempt Cat. B Ethnic service)
- Rotana Aflam (Operates as exempt Cat. B Ethnic service)
- Rotana Cinema (Operates as exempt Cat. B Ethnic service)
- Rotana Classic (Operates as exempt Cat. B Ethnic service)
- Rotana Clip (Operates as exempt Cat. B Ethnic service)
- Rotana Khalijiah (Operates as exempt Cat. B Ethnic service)
- Rotana M+ (Operates as exempt Cat. B Ethnic service)
- Rotana Masriya (Operates as exempt Cat. B Ethnic service)
- Rotana Mousica (Operates as exempt Cat. B Ethnic service)
- RTL Living (Operates as exempt Cat. B Ethnic service)
- RTS Sat (Operates as exempt Cat. B Ethnic service)
- RTVi (Operates as exempt Cat. B Ethnic service)
- Russian Illuzion (Operates as exempt Cat. B Ethnic service)
- SBTN (Operates as exempt Cat. B Ethnic service)
- Schlager TV (Operates as exempt Cat. B Ethnic service)
- Sky News Arabia (Operates as exempt Cat. B Ethnic service)
- Ten Cricket (ECGL Cricket TV)
- Travelxp (Travel XP Canada)
- TVCentr International (Operates as exempt Cat. B Ethnic service)
- TVi International (Operates as exempt Cat. B Ethnic service)
- TVP Info (Operates as exempt Cat. B Ethnic service)
- Zee 24 Taas (Operates as exempt Cat. B Ethnic service)
- Zee Bangla (Operates as exempt Cat. B Ethnic service)
- ZEE Bollywood (Bollywood Movies TV)
- Zee Cinema (Bollywood SD - Hindi Movie Channel)
- Zee Marathi (Operates as exempt Cat. B Ethnic service)
- Zee Punjabi (Operates as exempt Cat. B Ethnic service)
- Zee Salaam (Operates as exempt Cat. B Ethnic service)
- Zee Talkies (Operates as exempt Cat. B Ethnic service)
- Zee Tamil (Operates as exempt Cat. B Ethnic service)
- Zee TV Canada (Hindi Women's TV)
- Zing (Hindi Music TV)

=== Former channels ===
- MEGA Cosmos (Greek TV 1)
- NTV Canada (Operates as exempt Cat. B Ethnic service)
- RTVi+ (Russian TV Two)
- Tonis (Ukrainian TV One)

== Yet to launch ==
- South Asian News and Information TV
- Mandarin Children's TV
- South Asian Food TV
- Italian TV
- Hindi Women's TV 2

== Did not launch (Licence has expired) ==
- Arabic TV 2
- Armenian TV
- Bangladeshi/Bengali TV
- Bulgarian TV
- Caribbean TV
- Chinese Movie Channel
- Chinese News Channel
- Chinese (Cantonese) Home TV Channel
- Chinese (Mandarin) Entertainment TV
- Chinese (Mandarin) Family TV Channel
- Chinese/Taiwanese TV
- Croatian TV
- Czech TV
- Dutch TV
- Greek TV
- Greek TV 2
- Hindi/Urdu/Punjabi Movie Channel
- Hungarian TV
- Irish TV
- Israeli TV 2
- Norwegian TV
- Pakistan TV
- Polish News Channel
- Polish TV
- Portuguese/Brazil TV
- Portuguese TV
- Punjabi TV
- Romanian TV
- Russian TV 3
- Russian TV 4
- Serbian TV
- Slovak TV
- South Asian News Channel
- Spanish Extreme Sport TV
- Spanish Kids TV
- Spanish Movie TV
- Spanish Music TV
- Sri Lanka TV
- Swedish TV
- Telugu TV
- Urdu TV
- Turkish TV
- Ukrainian TV Two
