= VGN =

VGN is an initialism that could refer to:

- VGN, reporting mark of the former Virginian Railway (1907–1959)
- Verkehrsverbund Großraum Nürnberg (Transport Association of the Greater Nürnberg Area), mass transit agency in the Nuremberg Metropolitan Region, Germany
- Virgin Australia Holdings, Australian Securities Exchange code
- VGN TV, a Canadian channel for Vietnamese language specialty and local Canadian content
