= Viva Piñata (TV series) =

Television series

- The lead characters (l–r): Franklin, Hudson, Paulie, Fergy
- Genre: Comedy
- Based on: Viva Piñata by Xbox Game Studios and Rare
- Developed by: Norman J. Grossfeld; Lloyd Goldfine
- Directed by: Paul Griffin; Eric Stuart (voice director)
- Voices of: Dan Green; Rah Rah; David Wills; Marc Thompson; Kathleen Delaney; Jamie McGonnigal; Rebecca Soler; Eric Stuart
- Theme music composer: John Siegler; Norman J. Grossfeld
- Composers: Louis Cortelezzi; Elik Alvarez; Peter Lurye; Matt McGuire; Ralph Schuckett; Freddy Sheinfeld; Dan Stein; Russell Velazquez; Grant Kirkhope
- Countries of origin: Canada; United States
- Original language: English
- No. of seasons: 2
- No. of episodes: 52 (104 segments) (list of episodes)

Production
- Executive producers: Deina Bhesania; Norman J. Grossfeld; Alfred R. Kahn; Barry Ward; Lloyd Goldfine
- Running time: 22 minutes (11 minutes per segment)
- Production companies: Bardel Entertainment; 4Kids Entertainment; Microsoft

Original release
- Network: YTV (Canada); Fox (4Kids TV) (U.S., 2006–07); The CW (CW4Kids) (U.S., 2008)
- Release: August 26, 2006 – January 18, 2009

Viva Piñata is an animated children's television series produced by 4Kids Productions and Bardel Entertainment in collaboration with Microsoft. It is based on the Xbox 360 video game of the same name by Xbox Game Studios and Rare, which was released alongside the TV series. Lloyd Goldfine and Paul Griffin served as executive producers, with Mike de Sève acting as story editor and Anne Bernstein and David Steven Cohen among the series' writers.

Viva Piñata debuted on August 26, 2006, as part of the 4Kids TV programming block, later moving to The CW4Kids before being removed from the schedule on October 25, 2008. In Canada, the series aired on YTV, where its final episode was broadcast on January 18, 2009, and would continue to air in reruns until June 24, 2011.

== Synopsis ==
On Piñata Island, piñatas of various species roam the gardens freely, eating candy and coexisting with one another in a peaceful society. When a piñata's candy inside reaches a high enough level, they are sent to a party via the Piñata Central Cannoñata, where they will be broken open by the partygoers before being repaired and returned to the island. The series follows a group of close piñata friends and their day-to-day lives on the island that involves them evading the evil Professor Pester.

== Characters ==
=== Main characters ===
- Hudson Horstachio (voiced by Dan Green): One of the most popular piñatas in the business. As a celebrity, he sometimes has to disguise himself when in public. Hudson's friends often have to keep his ego in check. He enjoys dancing and making extravagant statements about himself.
- Fergy Fudgehog (voiced by David Wills): A glutton who fears parties, and is frequently sought out by Langston to attend parties, but always manages to escape. Fergy's catchphrase is "Oh, fudge!". He tends to lack self-control, especially when it comes to candy.
- Paulie Pretztail (voiced by Rah Rah): A no-nonsense piñata who is "the clever-cloggs" of the main cast (besides Les). He is Fergy's best friend and shares his aversion towards being sent to parties (though it's more of an annoyance to him, rather than Fergy's idea of thinking of going to a party as frightening). Paulie seems to be good at cooking as shown in a few episodes.
- Franklin Fizzlybear (voiced by Marc Thompson): A kind piñata who enjoys surfing, & speaks with a surfer accent and related expressions. Franklin is fairly laid back and occasionally has moments of intellectualism. He is not good at lying. Franklin is also a skilled artist. In the video game, his surfboard is an item that the player can purchase.
- Tina & Teddington Twingersnap (voiced by Kathleen Delaney and Jamie McGonnigal): A two-headed snake who share a body, but argue a lot. They have both been shown to have sub-par gardening skills. Despite hating each other (after all, they are brother and sister), one episode where they are accidentally separated had them greatly missing their other half. Teddington is sophisticated & a terrible singer, while Tina is more hot-headed.
- Ella Elephanilla (voiced by Rebecca Soler): A airheaded piñata who has short-term memory loss, contradicting the saying "an elephant never forgets".
- Les Galagoogoo (voiced by Eric Stuart): A smart and dexterous piñata. However, when he speaks, it comes out as high-pitched gibberish. Les ranked second place in the 4Kids Viva Piñata character poll. The main cast often misunderstand him even when he uses obvious gestures. He was able to speak in one episode, but was misunderstood still.
- Langston Lickatoad (voiced by Mike Pollock): The Cannoñata's operator. He regularly tries to catch the stealthy duo Fergy and Paulie in order to send them to parties.
- Professor Pester (voiced by David Brimmer): A voodoo-like islander & the main villain of the series. In most of his episodes, he and his Ruffians try to capture and destroy piñatas (usually Hudson) to obtain their candy. His catchphrases are "victory is mine", "oh, poo" & "I have no regrets", the latter which he says when his plans backfire. Professor Pester and the Ruffians are the only non-piñatas from the games to appear the show.
  - Ruffians: Professor Pester's bumbling henchmen who usually ruin his plans, since they don't comprehend orders well. They speak gibberish, waddle from side to side in their walk, and they love to prank one another. According to Pester, three are boys and one is a girl. There were originally 5 of them, but the 5th fell in a cauldron which Pester used to conjure his Sours.

=== Recurring characters ===
- Beverly Badgesicle (voiced by Rachel Butera): Hudson's biggest and very obsessive fan.
- Cecil Cocoadile: The only piñata on the island who thinks Chortles' jokes are funny, causing him to burst into tears laughing. In the series, Cocoadile tears make excellent fertilizer, so while laughing to tears at his bad jokes, he is also helping Chortles with his garden.
- Chortles Chippopotamus (voiced by Sean Schemmel): Chortles has a horrible sense of humor, but fantastic gardening skills. Only Cecil Cocoadile thinks his jokes are funny, and Chortles uses Cecil's tears to help his garden grow.
- Corrina Chocstrich (voiced by Maddie Blaustein): Hudson's ex-girlfriend who holds grudges against him.
- Dr. Quincy Quackberry (voiced by Gary Littman): An incompetent doctor and psychiatrist (a play on the term "quack doctor") with a Groucho Marx-like personality. He wears glasses and a tie, and he customarily tells poor jokes.
- Florence Fizzlybear (voiced by Aubrey Adair): Franklin's love interest. She's a playable character in Viva Piñata: Party Animals along with Hailey, Francine & Petunia.
- Francine Fudgehog (voiced by Darren Dunstan): Fergy's overly doting mother, who still treats him like a child.
- The Great Bonboon: A con artist who pretends to be an all-knowing guru to steal candy from gullible piñatas, especially Fergy. When no one is present, he talks to his friend Sid on the phone in his normal voice. Paulie is one of the few piñatas who sees through his ruse.
- Hailey Horstachio (voiced by Lori Boone): A young celebrity who is at odds with Hudson. She appears to be Spanish or Latin American.
- Hoofy Horstachio: Hudson's obese uncle who constantly coughs.
- King Roario (voiced by Dan Green): The King of Piñata Island.
- Mabel Moozipan (voiced by Andi Whaley): She owns a well-kept vegetable garden and despises trespassers. Mabel is friends with Florence Fizzlybear.
- Pecky Pudgeon (voiced by Eric Stuart): A reporter & photographer who takes photos for the local newspaper of Piñata Island, the Piñata Yada Yada. He loves gossiping about everyone and will go to great lengths to bring in a juicy scoop for the paper. He has a New York accent.
- Petunia Pretztail (voiced by Seiko Shih): A martial artist who is friends with Florence Fizzlybear, Francine Fudgehog & Hailey Hostachio.
- Pierre Parrybo (voiced by Pete Zarustica): A Frenchman who emcees various activities on Piñata Island. He's also the DJ for a call-in radio show.
- Prewitt Profitamole (voiced by Mike MacRae): An absent-minded mechanic who is a wonder at inventing, & sometimes in charge of restoring the piñatas when they return from parties broken. He also has a love for soaps, and watches them avidly.
- Shirley Shellybean (voiced by Kayzie Rogers): A slow, pessimistic piñata.
- Simone Cinnamonkey (voiced by Rebecca Soler): Hudson's brisk and resourceful talent agent. She speaks very quickly, rapidly counting off Hudson's schedule. Sometimes, Simone seems to want her pay more than Hudson's fame, but she is occasionally shown to care for him in both stern and encouraging ways.
- The Big Boss: An unknown entity who's Langston's boss. He communicates with a speaker in a fruit bowl, & his actual whereabouts is never revealed.

== Home media ==
Two episodes, "Chewnicorn in the Garden" and "Horstachio of a Different Color", were released for free download on the Xbox Live Marketplace as sneak peeks prior to the show's release. "Horstachio of a Different Color" was also featured on a bonus disc included with the Special Edition version of the Viva Piñata game.

=== Region 1 (United States/Canada) ===
Shout! Factory released two DVD volumes for Viva Piñata. The first, The Piñatas Must Be Crazy And Other Stories, was released in February 2009 and contains episodes 1-5.

Title	Release date
Viva Piñata Vol. 1: The Piñatas Must Be Crazy and Other Stories	February 10, 2009
Episodes: 1: "Cocaodile Tears/Candiosity"; 2: "Queen for a Day/Chewnicorn in the Garden"; 3: "Legs/Horstachio of a Different Color"; 4: "Whirlm with a Dream/The Crush"; 5: "Trojan Horstachio/The Pinatas Must Be Crazy"
Viva Piñata Vol. 2: Lights, Camera, Action!	May 19, 2009
Episodes: 6: "Franklin Can't Dance/Les Saves the Day...Again!"; 7: "Sick Day/Lights, Camera, Action!"; 8: "Mad Mongo/Hudson's Biggest Fan"; 9: "Mission: Impiñatable/My Little Fergy"; 10: "The Great Gob Rush/Hero"

=== Region 4 (Australia/New Zealand) ===
DVDs in these regions were released by Magna Pacific.

Title	Release date
Volume 1: 1: "Cocaodile Tears/Candiosity"; 2: "Queen for a Day/A Chewnicorn in the Garden"; 3: "Legs/Horstachio of a Different Color"; 4: "Whirlm with a Dream/The Crush"; Volume 2: 1: "Trojan Horstachio/The Pinatas Must Be Crazy"; 2: "Franklin Can't Dance/Les Saves the Day...Again!"; 3: "Sick Day/Lights, Camera, Action!"; 4: "Mad Mongo/Hudson's Biggest Fan"; Volume 3: 1: "Mission: Impiñatable/My Little Fergy"; 2: "The Great Gob Rush/Hero"; 3: "On a Sour Note/Pig-Out Mountain"; 4: "Piñatapartyphobia/Royal Visit"

== International broadcast ==
In April 2007, the series was already airing on France 3 (France) and RTL2 (Germany), and had been pre-sold to Mediaset (Italy), TV2 (Denmark), MTV3 (Finland) and Momo Kids (Taiwan). In October, the series would see additional pre-sales to TV3 (New Zealand), Animax (South Korea), Kids Central (Singapore), Canal J (France), Nickelodeon (UK, Netherlands, Spain, Australia & New Zealand), NRK (Norway), SIC (Portugal), and Children's Channel (Israel).
