= Israel+ =

International television network

- Country: Israel
- Broadcast area: Israel; North America; Europe; Africa; India; Sri Lanka; Singapore; South Korea; Japan; Taiwan; Australia; Nepal

Ownership
- Owner: private

History
- Launched: September 2001
- Former names: The Israeli Network (2021-2024)

Links
- Website: Official website

Israel+, formerly known as The Israeli Network (Hebrew: הערוץ הישראלי), is an international private television network. It launched September 2001 and features programming from all the top networks in Israel including Kan 11, Keshet 12, Reshet 13, Channel 10, Channel 8, Israeli Educational Television, Arutz HaYeladim, Hop! and Sports Channel. The channel broadcasts from facilities in Kfar Sabaa and has offices in New York, Los Angeles and Miami.

Israel+ is available in North America; in the United States via Dish Network, Cablevision, Verizon FiOS & Comcast and in Canada via Rogers Cable & Bell Fibe TV through a partnership with Ethnic Channels Group. It is also available in Europe and Africa through select providers and now in Caribbean Latin America Middle East Asia and the Pacific.

The channel carried the Eurovision Song Contest in 2003 and 2004, in Hebrew. The channel started providing English subtitles in 2010.

Original logo (2001-2016)

Second logo (2016-2024)

In late August 2024, the channel was renamed Israel+.

== See also ==
- Israel+ Canada
