= RTVi+ (Canada) =

- RTVi+ logo
- Country: Canada
- Broadcast area: National
- Headquarters: Toronto, Ontario

Programming
- Picture format: 4:3 (480i, SDTV)

Ownership
- Owner: Ethnic Channels Group
- Sister channels: RTVi

History
- Launched: November 9, 2004; 20 years ago
- Closed: November 2009

RTVi+ was a Canadian category 2 Russian language digital cable specialty channel and is owned by Ethnic Channels Group. It broadcast Russian movies, TV series, cartoons as well as local Canadian content.

== History ==
=== TV Centre ===
On November 9, 2004, the Ethnic Channels Group (ECG) launched an ethnic Category 2 Specialty television service under the licence Russian TV Two issued by the Canadian Radio-television and Telecommunications Commission (CRTC). The channel was branded as TV Centre and initially broadcast programming of a Russian satellite TV service known as Moscow – Open World (Москва — Открытый мир). That time, Moscow - Open World held the exclusive rights to bring the programming of Russian terrestrial TV network TV Centre (ТВ Центр) outside Russia. However, due to a conflict between the partners, in summer 2005, TV Centre launched its own international version of the channel, TVCI (TV Centre International), intended for Russian Diasporas around the world. As a result, Moscow - Open World became defunct and ECG switched the channel programming to TVCI.

=== RTVi+ ===
In Fall 2005, ECG re-branded the channel to be known as RTVi+ and switched its programming to the 'world feed' of RTVI In November, 2009, all television providers who carried the channel had dropped it without comment.
