= List of Viva Piñata episodes =

The following is a list of episodes for the animated television series Viva Piñata.

== Overview ==
Viva Piñata premiered on August 26, 2006, on 4Kids TV. It is a co-production between 4Kids Entertainment and YTV Original Production, and is animated by Bardel Entertainment. It aired in more than 107 different countries and was translated into 27 languages.

The first 20 episodes of season 1, alongside the final segment of the season "Six Million Dollar Pinata" were aired from August 26, 2006, to April 28, 2007, while the last 5.5 episodes were held over until the fall season, beginning September 8, 2007. The first 8 episodes of Season 2 were then aired following them, until December 8, 2007. The remaining 18 episodes of Season 2 aired on the Canadian television network YTV beginning on July 2, 2008, and aired on The CW4Kids beginning September 13, 2008, but then was removed from the block on October 18, 2008, after airing six episodes. As of January 18, 2009, 40 episodes have aired on the United States and all 52 episodes have aired in Canada, where it has completed its television run.

Each season consists of 26 episodes, while each episode consists of two eleven-minute segments.

== Series overview ==
Season	Segments	Episodes	Originally released	
Season	Segments	Episodes	First released	Last released
1	52	26	August 26, 2006	October 13, 2007
2	52	26	October 20, 2007	January 18, 2009

== Episodes ==
=== Season 1 (2006–07) ===
Episodes are story edited by Mike de Sève and produced by Lloyd Golfine and Paul Griffin.

Unless otherwise noted, the original airdates refer to the episodes' premieres on 4Kids TV.

No. overall	No. in season	Title	Directed by	Written by	Original release date	Prod. code	K6–11 rating/share
1	1	"Cocoadile Tears"	Andrew Duncan	John Reynolds (credited); Michael Quinn (WGA Directory)	August 26, 2006	004	0.6/5
1	1	"Candiosity"	Daniel Deserranno	David Benjoya	August 26, 2006	003	0.6/5
Cocoadile Tears: Tina and Teddington try to gather Cocoadile tears to improve their garden. Absent: Hudson Horstachio, Ella Elephanilla (heard only) Candiosity: Fergy tries everything to decrease his candiosity so that he does not have to go to a party.
2	2	"Queen for a Day"	Steve Sacks	David Steven Cohen	August 26, 2006	005	0.9/5
2	2	"A Chewnicorn in the Garden"	Steve Sacks	David Steven Cohen	August 26, 2006	001	0.9/5
Queen For a Day: After Franklin attracts Buzzlegums to his house, they crown him their leader. Absent: Ella Elephanilla, Tina and Teddington Twingersnap A Chewnicorn in the Garden: Fergy and Franklin work to convince Paulie that Chewnicorns are real. Absent: Hudson Horstachio, Ella Elephanilla, Tina and Teddington Twingersnap
3	3	"Legs"	Daniel Deserranno	David Benjoya	September 9, 2006	007	N/A
3	3	"Horstachio of a Different Color"	Ian Freedman	Anne D. Bernstein	September 9, 2006	002	N/A
Legs: After losing his legs during practice for a dance competition, Fergy must use the legs of a Cluckles instead. Absent: Hudson Horstachio Horstachio of a Different Color: As the Spring Fair Horstachio Competition approaches, Hudson becomes disheartened by the appearance of a new rival named Hamilton. Absent: Les Galagoogoo, Ella Elephanilla, Tina and Teddington Twingersnap
4	4	"Whirlm with a Dream"	Andrew Duncan	Anne D. Bernstein	September 16, 2006	008	N/A
4	4	"The Crush"	Ian Freedman	David Steven Cohen	September 16, 2006	006	N/A
Whirlm with a Dream: Wilson Whirlm wants to go to a party, but cannot due his small stature. The Crush: Ella Elephanilla accepts invites from both Fergy and Paulie to go to the Dance of Romance, causing conflict between the two.
5	5	"Trojan Horstachio"	Ian Freedman	John Reynolds	September 23, 2006	011	1.6/6
5	5	"The Piñatas Must Be Crazy"	Paul Griffin	Robert David	September 23, 2006	009	1.6/6
Trojan Horstachio: Professor Pester and his henchmen disguise as a female Horstachio to capture Hudson. The Piñatas Must Be Crazy: The Great Bonboon convinces everyone that a balloon animal is a supreme being named Piñator.
6	6	"Franklin Can't Dance"	Daniel Deserranno	David Benjoya	September 30, 2006	012	1.1/5
6	6	"Les Saves the Day...Again!"	Ian Freedman	Robert David	October 14, 2006	016	1.6/7
Franklin Can't Dance: Franklin tries to impress a female Fizzlybear with his dancing after his friends say that he's a champion, but is unable to. Les Saves the Day...Again!: Les tries to save everyone from a volcanic eruption, but as usual, they cannot understand his warnings, resulting in his friends turning against him.
7	7	"Sick Day"	Paul Griffin	John Reynolds	October 7, 2006	014	1.0/4
7	7	"Lights, Camera, Action!"	Andrew Duncan	David Benjoya	October 7, 2006	013	1.0/4
Sick Day: When the other Piñatas fall ill and begin sneezing out their candy, Fergy takes care of them in hopes of catching their cold. Lights, Camera, Action!: Professor Pester disguises himself as Hollywood director Reg Upchuck, causing everyone but Paulie to want to be in his production.
8	8	"Mad Mongo"	Daniel Deserranno	John Reynolds	October 21, 2006	022	0.9/4
8	8	"Hudson's Biggest Fan"	Andrew Duncan	Anne D. Bernstein	October 28, 2006	018	1.3/5
Mad Mongo: The Piñatas discover a Sour Macaraccoon in their jungle, and Franklin tries to tame it. Hudson's Biggest Fan: Hudson tries to drive away his biggest and most crazed fan, Beverly Badgesicle.
9	9	"Mission: Impiñatable"	Zeke Norton; Paul Griffin	Craig Shemin	November 4, 2006	019	0.8/4
9	9	"My Little Fergy"	Steve Sacks	Anne D. Bernstein	November 4, 2006	020	0.8/4
Mission: Impiñatable: Hudson is unknowingly captured by Professor Pester, thinking it's an exotic club, while his friends try to rescue him. My Little Fergy: Fergy's mother comes to visit, causing Fergy great embarrassment for never having gone to a party, despite his letters to her claiming otherwise.
10	10	"The Great Gob Rush"	Daniel Deserranno	Anne D. Bernstein	November 11, 2006	017	0.5/2
10	10	"Hero"	Ian Freedman	David Steven Cohen	November 18, 2006	021	1.1/4
The Great Gob Rush: Fergy discovers a cave filled with golden caramel clusters, which sparks a rush in the other Piñatas attempting to find it as well. Hero: Franklin saves Hudson's life, making him a hero, but has difficulty coping with this new identity, and Hudson struggles to cope with his own fame being overshadowed by Franklin's.
11	11	"On a Sour Note"	Steve Sacks	David Benjoya; Craig Shemin	February 3, 2007	015	N/A
11	11	"Pig-Out Mountain"	Andrew Duncan	John Reynolds	February 3, 2007	023	N/A
On a Sour Note: The Piñatas start a rock band and become a success after a Sour Profitamole joins the band as lead singer. Pig-Out Mountain: Paulie and Fergy join Rory Rashberry and his gang on an expedition up Pig-Out Mountain, the supposed location of a great bounty of food with the intention of living there.
12	12	"Piñatapartyphobia"	Steve Sacks	Michael Quinn	February 10, 2007	010	1.3/5
12	12	"Royal Visit"	Steve Sacks	John Reynolds	February 10, 2007	025	1.3/5
Piñatapartyphobia: Dr. Quackberry attempts to cure Fergy of his fear of parties. Royal Visit: Fergy attempts to get knighted by King Roario so he will no longer have to go to parties, but is first tasked with slaying a Dragonache.
13	13	"The Wraisins of Wrath"	Ian Freedman	Michael Quinn; Craig Shemin	February 17, 2007	026	1.1/4
13	13	"Piñata Island Idol"	Daniel Deserranno	Michael Quinn	February 17, 2007	027	1.1/4
The Wraisins of Wrath: The raisins in Fergy and Paulie's pie cause the Piñatas to act in the opposite of their usual behavior. Piñata Island Idol: After the dance hall collapses from a wild night of dancing, Hudson hosts a talent show, and the residents of Piñata Island must gather ten thousand chocolate coins to rebuild it.
14	14	"To Catch a Piñata"	Andrew Duncan	Anne D. Bernstein	February 24, 2007	028	1.0/4
14	14	"Invasion of the Boogie Snatchers"	Zeke Norton	David Steven Cohen	February 24, 2007	029	1.0/4
15	15	"Candibalism"	Steve Sacks	Robert David	March 3, 2007	030	1.0/4
15	15	"Pecky Pudgeon, Private Eye"	Ian Freedman	Michael Quinn	March 3, 2007	031	1.0/4
Candibalism: Fergy tries to pass off a chocolate Bunnycomb as his cousin, but is then charged with cannibalism after eating it. Pecky Pudgeon, Private Eye: After Ella goes missing, Pecky Pudgeon begins a search for her.
16	16	"Rocket to Nowhere"	Daniel Deserranno	John Reynolds	March 10, 2007	037	1.3/5
16	16	"Twingersnapped!"	Michael Dowding	Michael Quinn	March 10, 2007	033	1.3/5
Rocket to Nowhere: The Great Bonboon offers to send Fergy on a rocket to another planet in exchange for all his candy. Twingersnapped!: After being lost in the jungle, Teddington and Tina become split in two.
17	17	"Franklingestion"	Steven Sacks	David Steven Cohen	March 17, 2007	035	N/A
17	17	"Confetti-itis" "Confetti-It Is"	Daniel Deserranno	Anne D. Bernstein	March 31, 2007	032	1.2/5
Franklingestion: After a party he can't remember, Franklin finds himself spewing out vegetables. Confetti-itis: Franklin comes down with a case of Confetti-itis, losing much of his coat, and must consult Dr. Quackberry for a cure.
18	18	"Soil and Green"	Zeke Norton	David Benjoya	March 24, 2007	034	1.0/5
18	18	"I, Pretztail"	Ian Freedman	Robert David	March 24, 2007	036	1.0/5
Soil and Green: Fergy and Paulie discover an abandoned farm where they meet Wendell, a Whirlm who can make plants grow wherever he digs. I, Pretztail: Paulie learns from the official files that he is supposedly not a Pretztail, but rather a Squazzil.
19	19	"Free the Piñatas"	Michael Dowding	Michael Quinn	April 7, 2007	038	1.2/5
19	19	"For My Next Trick"	Paul Griffin	Michael Quinn	April 14, 2007	040	1.2/5
Free the Piñatas: A disguised Professor Pester persuades the Piñatas to march on Piñata Central and destroy the Cannonata. For My Next Trick: Franklin takes up being a magician after watching a magic show, but Professor Pester seeks to take the wand for himself.
20	20	"Treasure of Piñata Madre"	Zeke Norton	David Steven Cohen	April 21, 2007	049	1.0/4
20	20	"Between a Flock and a Hard Place"	Ian Freedman	David Benjoya	April 21, 2007	041	1.0/4
Treasure of Piñata Madre: Franklin, Fergy, and Paulie discover a treasure chest from a saltwater taffy factory and go on a journey to return it. Between a Flock and a Hard Place: A disgruntled Goobaa leads his flock on a rampage through Piñatas' gardens, leaving the blame placed squarely on Teddington.
21	21	"High Plains Drafter"	Daniel Deserranno	Robert David	September 8, 2007	047	1.0/4
21	21	"Pester's Party"	Zeke Norton	Michael Quinn	September 8, 2007	044	1.0/4
High Plains Drafter: A caricature artist named El Sketcho arrives in town, and with his work causes great damage to the confidence of the other Piñatas, leading them to try and convince Franklin to come out of caricature retirement to take him down. Pester's Party: Professor Pester changes the coordinates of the Cannonata so that it launches Fergy and Paulie to a fake party of his own.
22	22	"Mouse Flap"	Paul Griffin	Anne D. Bernstein	September 15, 2007	045	1.1/5
22	22	"Snow Place Like Home"	Ian Freedman	Anne D. Bernstein	September 15, 2007	046	1.1/5
Mouse Flap: Monty Mousemallow, a paranoid Piñata, becomes furious when Franklin accidentally sits on him. Snow Place Like Home: Paulie and Fergy retire to Amazing Acres, which, to their surprise, turns out to be in the Arctic tundra.
23	23	"The Abominable Jeli"	Zeke Norton	David Benjoya	September 22, 2007	039	1.2/5
23	23	"Mirror Shmirror"	Michael Dowding	Robert David	September 22, 2007	043	1.2/5
The Abominable Jeli: Fergy, Franklin, Hudson, and Les find themselves caught in a great snowball war between an army of Pengums and Jerry Jeli. Mirror Shmirror: Franklin is launched into a different dimension where he encounters an evil version of himself, Spanklin, the dictator of Piñata Central.
24	24	"My Pal Langston"	Michael Dowding	John Reynolds	September 29, 2007	048	1.1/5
24	24	"Snail's Pace"	Paul Griffin	Michael Quinn	September 29, 2007	050	1.1/5
My Pal Langston: Fergy and Paulie aim to become Langston's best friends so that he will not force them to go to parties. Snail's Pace: In the Piñata Island soccer tournament, Fergy's team reaches the final despite having the very sluggish Shirley Shelleybean on board. However, everyone must work together, including Shirley, when a band of Sours replaces their opponents in the final game.
25	25	"Hudson on Hudson"	Daniel Deserranno	Matthew Drdek	October 6, 2007	052	0.9/4
25	25	"Wild Horstachios"	Zeke Norton	David Benjoya; John Reynolds	October 6, 2007	024	0.9/4
Hudson on Hudson: Hudson puts on a show with a puppet version of himself, but quickly finds himself in an ego crisis as a result. Wild Horstachios: Hudson winds up living with a group of wild Horstachios, having to live out in the rough for the first time in his life.
26	26	"My Sweet Sours"	Ian Freedman	David Steven Cohen	October 13, 2007	051	1.1/5
26	26	"Six Million Dollar Piñata"	Daniel Deserranno	John Reynolds	April 28, 2007	042	1.2/5
My Sweet Sours: Professor Pester recalls when he first created the Sours and began his scheming ways. Six Million Dollar Piñata: Fergy is rebuilt as a bionic Piñata, but quickly loses control of his new functions and goes on a rampage.

=== Season 2 (2007–09) ===
Episodes are now produced by Lloyd Goldfine and Steven R. Melchiorre.

No. overall	No. in season	Title	Directed by	Written by	4Kids airdate	YTV airdate	Prod. code	K6–11 rating/share
27	1	"A Terrible Tribute"	Daniel Deserranno	Anne D. Bernstein	October 20, 2007	July 29, 2008	056	1.4/7
27	1	"Pester the Piñata"	Zeke Norton	John Reynolds; Eric Scott	October 20, 2007	July 29, 2008	061	1.4/7
A Terrible Tribute: Hudson is placed on a show called "This Here's Your Life", where he is met by different Piñatas from his past. Pester the Piñata: Professor Pester's plan to gain candy goes awry, resulting in him getting amnesia and thinking that he is a baby Piñata, with Fergy as his mother.
28	2	"Fudge Match"	Daniel Deserranno	David Benjoya	October 27, 2007	July 29, 2008	063	N/A
28	2	"Hudson's Holiday"	Michael Dowding	John Reynolds; Eric Scott	October 27, 2007	July 29, 2008	057	N/A
Fudge Match: When an impressive Fudgehog named Flex comes to town, Fergy becomes jealous of him and challenges him to a race to prove himself to his friends. Hudson's Holiday: After Hudson gets twitches from stress due to being overworked, he is forced on vacation on a deserted island.
29	3	"Hudson Tells All"	Ian Freedman	Robert David	November 3, 2007	July 2, 2008	053	0.9/4
29	3	"Langston's Jameleon Cousins"	Francisco Avalon	John Reynolds & Eric Scott	November 3, 2007	July 2, 2008	059	0.9/4
Hudson Tells All: Hudson's angry rant against two Sweetooth workers gets recorded onto his talking doll by accident, offending the other Piñatas. Langston's Jameleon Cousins: Langston's three Jameleon cousins come to visit and pull pranks on Langston, befriending Fergy in the process.
30	4	"The Fudgetive"	Michael Dowding	Anne D. Bernstein	November 10, 2007	July 3, 2008	060	1.4/6
30	4	"She Stomps at Night"	Ian Freedman	David Benjoya	November 10, 2007	July 3, 2008	069	1.4/6
The Fudgetive: Fergy's plan to go into hiding goes awry when he tricks the Piñatas into believing he has been kidnapped by Professor Pester, who is currently on vacation. She Stomps at Night: Professor Pester hires Tony Taffly to lure a sleepwalking Ella to his lair, and Fergy and Paulie must do what they can to stop her.
31	5	"Les the Jet Setter"	Daniel Deserranno	Randolph Heard	November 17, 2007	July 4, 2008	066	N/A
31	5	"Slayin' Em at the Sands"	Francisco Avalos	David Benjoya	November 17, 2007	July 4, 2008	058	N/A
Les the Jet Setter: Fergy discovers Les' jetpack, and secretly uses it to avoid going to parties. Slayin' Em at the Sands: Pester captures Paulie's cousins, the Pieenas, and performs a comedy routine to make them laugh until they lose their candy.
32	6	"Crimes of Passion Fruit"	Zeke Norton	David Benjoya	November 24, 2007	July 7, 2008	067	N/A
32	6	"The Antlers Are Blowin' in the Wind"	Michael Dowding	Robert David	November 24, 2007	July 7, 2008	062	N/A
Crimes of Passion Fruit: Fergy confronts to the Big Boss of Piñata Central, and after finding out that he is seemingly a bowl of fruit, in a rage ends up smashing and eating him. The Antlers Are Blowin' in the Wind: Paulie and Fergy work with their new friend Machi Moojoo to escape from going to parties.
33	7	"Sumo Tsunami"	Francisco Avalos	Robert David	December 1, 2007	July 7, 2008	065	0.8/3
33	7	"Recipe for Disaster"	Ian Freedman	Anne D. Bernstein	December 1, 2007	July 7, 2008	064	0.8/3
Sumo Tsunami: Fergy becomes a sumo wrestler so he can gorge himself with food. Recipe for Disaster: Fergy and Paulie enter a cooking contest, facing Shirley Shellybean and Professor Pester for a lifetime supply of candy.
34	8	"Mr. Unbustable"	Daniel Deserranno	Robert David	December 8, 2007	July 8, 2008	072	0.9/4
34	8	"Too Many Fergys"	Zeke Norton	Michael Quinn	December 8, 2007	July 8, 2008	079	0.9/4
Mr. Unbustable: Fergy works out at the gym so that he may become unbreakable at parties; however, his plan backfires when this turns him into a spectacle. Too Many Fergys: Fergy travels through a time portal, resulting in meeting himself from the previous day.
35	9	"Party Parasite"	Ian Freedman	Randolph Heard	September 13, 2008	July 8, 2008	078	1.1/5
35	9	"Hibernation Nation"	Michael Dowding	David Benjoya	September 13, 2008	July 8, 2008	071	1.1/5
Party Parasite: Hudson learns from Dr. Quackberry that he has a parasite that is eating up all of his candy. Hibernation Nation: Franklin invites his friends to a hibernation party in the mountains.
36	10	"The Old Piñatas Home"	Daniel Deserranno	Michael Quinn	September 20, 2008	July 9, 2008	055	1.2/5
36	10	"Shirley Shells Out"	Rick Allen; Francisco Avalos	Michael Quinn	September 20, 2008	July 9, 2008	070	1.2/5
The Old Piñatas Home: Fergy and his friends visit Fergy's uncle at a retirement home and decide that they need to spruce it up. Shirley Shells Out: Shirley enters a race, during which she is given a potion by Professor Pester that turns her into a Sour.
37	11	"The Transparent Trap"	Michael Dowding	David Benjoya	September 27, 2008	July 9, 2008	075	N/A
37	11	"To Catch a Pester"	Zeke Norton	Robert David	September 27, 2008	July 9, 2008	054	N/A
The Transparent Trap: The Great Bonboon convinces Fergy that he has turned invisible after drinking his special tonic. To Catch a Pester: The Piñatas decide to lock up Professor Pester in their new jail, but wind up waiting on him hand and foot as a result.
38	12	"My Sweet Swanana"	Zeke Norton	Anne D. Bernstein	October 4, 2008	July 10, 2008	074	N/A
38	12	"Ella Forgets to Forget"	Ian Freedman	Michael Quinn	October 4, 2008	July 10, 2008	077	N/A
My Sweet Swanana: Fergy and Paulie set up Rory Rashberry on a date with Svetlana Swanana in hopes that Rory will move out of Paulie's house. Ella Forgets to Forget: Fergy sets up a service in which Piñatas can unload their secrets on Ella, since she always forgets what she is told; however, she begins to remember them.
39	13	"Motivational Beak"	Rick Allen	John Reynolds; Eric Scott	October 11, 2008	July 10, 2008	073	0.7/4
39	13	"Bringing Up Cluckle"	Daniel Deserranno	John Reynolds; Eric Scott	October 11, 2008	July 10, 2008	083	0.7/4
Motivational Beak: Langston enlists a drill sergeant, Eddie Eglair, to whip Fergy and Paulie into shape and force them to go to parties. Bringing Up Cluckle: Hudson begins a big brother program and finds himself taking care of a mother Cluckle's three children, one of them being a Dragonache.
40	14	"Beauty and the Beasts"	Michael Dowding	Randolph Heard	October 18, 2008	July 6, 2008	085	0.7/3
40	14	"The Talented Mr. Hack"	Zeke Norton	Robert David	October 18, 2008	July 6, 2008	084	0.7/3
Beauty and the Beasts: Hudson hosts the Miss Piñata beauty pageant, but after meeting all three contestants he hates, he asks Fergy, Franklin, and Paulie to enter disguised as females. The Talented Mr. Hack: Hudson hires a hillbilly Horstachio named Hack to be his look-alike, but after feeling used, Hack imprisons Hudson and takes his place among the Piñatas.
41	15	"De-Mock-Racy"	Ian Freedman	Michael Quinn	N/A	July 11, 2008	087	N/A
41	15	"Her Royal Forgetfulness"	Rick Allen	Robert David	N/A	July 11, 2008	081	N/A
De-Mock-Racy: The Big Boss decides to hold elections for Langston's position as "Commander Guy", and Hudson emerges as the frontrunner. Her Royal Forgetfulness: After learning that she is a Queen, Fergy convinces Ella that he is her husband, the King, and soon begins to abuse his newfound power.
42	16	"The Wrong Stuff"	Daniel Deserranno	Robert David	N/A	July 20, 2008	088	N/A
42	16	"Piñatametermania"	Michael Dowding	Michael Quinn	N/A	July 20, 2008	068	N/A
The Wrong Stuff: Langston announces that Hudson will be sent to the first ever party on the moon, but it turns out to be Professor Pester's space station, so the gang must go up to rescue him. Piñatametermania: After a mix up at a movie theater, the Piñatas wind up with the wrong Piñatameters, resulting in each of them having the wrong job.
43	17	"Heads and Tails" "Piñata Heads and Tails"	Craig Roberts	Randolph Heard	N/A	July 27, 2008	089	N/A
43	17	"Speechless"	Zeke Norton	Michael Quinn	N/A	July 27, 2008	086	N/A
Heads and Tails: A faulty Piñata repair robot known as the Assemblata causes Hudson's head to be placed on Fergy's body, and he is placed in a Freakata show by a circus ringmaster. Speechless: Tina loses her voice, allowing Teddington to pursue his terrible singing without her complaints.
44	18	"Good Clop, Bad Clop"	Daniel Deserranno	John Reynolds; Eric Scott	N/A	August 3, 2008	095	N/A
44	18	"Announce This"	Zeke Norton	Robert David; Michael de Sève	N/A	August 10, 2008	100	N/A
Good Clop, Bad Clop: When Hudson becomes a police officer, he arrests every Piñata on the island, including himself. Announce This: Hudson, Pierre and Pecky compete for the position of commentator for the Party Animals Championship Challenge.
45	19	"Ruffians on Strike"	Rick Allen	Anne D. Bernstein	N/A	August 3, 2008	080	N/A
45	19	"Zip It Good"	Craig Roberts	Yvette Kaplan	N/A	August 11, 2008	098	N/A
Ruffians on Strike: After leading the Ruffians in a strike against Professor Pester for his cruel behavior, Hudson finds himself wanting to send the Ruffians back to their master. Zip it Good: Hudson takes a vow of silence after a crisis of self-indulgence.
46	20	"Tabloid for Two"	Daniel Deserranno	Anne D. Bernstein	N/A	August 24, 2008	092	N/A
46	20	"All Spun Out"	Michael Dowding	Anne D. Bernstein	N/A	August 10, 2008	090	N/A
Tabloid for Two: When rumors of celebrity rivals Hudson and Hayley Horstachio being an item are spread by their agents which upsets Beverly Badgesicle, the two are forced into a wedding despite hating each other. All Spun Out: Professor Pester opens the spinning Red Hot nightclub in a scheme to draw in all of the Piñatas and make them barf out their candy.
47	21	"Arctic Invasion"	Craig Roberts	John Reynolds; Eric Scott	N/A	September 6, 2008	082	N/A
47	21	"Say Uncle Hoofy"	Michael Dowding	Anne D. Bernstein	N/A	August 24, 2008	096	N/A
Arctic Invasion: A popular band named "The Pengums" takes Piñata Central by storm, prompting Hudson and Langston to work together to get rid of them. Say Uncle Hoofy: Hudson and Fergy discover that Fergy's mother Francine and Hudson's uncle Hoofy are now married, and the two of them fight over who is the "favorite son".
48	22	"A Match Made in Court"	Zeke Norton	Robert David	N/A	September 6, 2008	093	N/A
48	22	"Hudson's Better Half"	Rick Allen	Michael Quinn	N/A	August 11, 2008	102	N/A
A Match Made in Court: Hudson has been sent to court by Beverly for avoiding her, and Langston rewards her with an attaining order, the opposite of a restraining order, where she must be in ten feet's range of Hudson. Hudson's Better Half: Hailey Horstachio and her all-female team face Hudson's all-male team in an obstacle course championship challenge, but a twist soon has them competing to lose rather than win.
49	23	"Hudsonly Ever After"	Daniel Deserranno	David Benjoya	N/A	September 13, 2008	099	N/A
49	23	"Hudson Who-Stachio?" "The Skids are Alright"	Michael Dowding	David Benjoya	N/A	September 13, 2008	091	N/A
Hudsonly Ever After: Finding himself unable to sleep, Hudson tells his dummy the story of Hansel and Gretel, but decides there isn't enough of himself in it. Hudson Who-Stachio?: Hudson falls into a personal crisis after being ignored by kids at a party.
50	24	"The Horstachio Who Never Was"	Craig Roberts	Michael Quinn	N/A	January 11, 2009	104	N/A
50	24	"Fergy Drops Out"	Michael Dowding	Anne D. Bernstein	N/A	January 18, 2009	076	N/A
The Horstachio Who Never Was: Fearing Pester will kidnap Hudson, Langston gives him a new identity, however, Hudson makes himself a third identity that the others prefer to himself. Fergy Drops Out: After Langston initiates a party re-education course for the entire island, Fergy and Paulie flee to the desert, where they find a group of free spirit Chocstriches who reject parties; since Fergy has never been to a party, they declare him their master.
51	25	"Super Hero Hudson"	Michael Dowding	Randolph Heard	N/A	January 18, 2009	097	N/A
51	25	"The Amazing Hudini"	Michael Dowding	John Reynolds; Eric Scott	N/A	September 14, 2008	094	N/A
Super Hero Hudson: Hudson gains superpowers after accidentally licking a meteorite that lands in his bathtub, becoming Super Hud. However, after Super Hud becomes overbearing, Hudson's friends conspire with Professor Pester to stop him. The Amazing Hudini: In order to revive his career, Hudson seeks to become a stunt performer, and goes to a retired impossiblist named Blaine Bunnycomb to learn the ropes.
52	26	"Variations on a Theme Park"	Daniel Deserranno	David Benjoya	N/A	September 14, 2008	103	N/A
52	26	"Masters of Klutz Fu"	Craig Roberts	Randolph Heard	N/A	January 11, 2009	101	N/A
Variations on a Theme Park: Rodney Raisant's attempts to build an amusement park named Rodney Land are repeatedly squashed by Hudson. Masters of Klutz Fu: Fergy and Paulie decide to learn martial arts to fend off kids at parties. However, since finding that Petunia Pretztail's style, Petunia Fu, is exclusive to her, they develop their own martial art, Klutz Fu.
