= Kathleen Delaney =

American voice actress (born 1965)

Kathleen R. Delaney
- Born: March 5, 1965 (age 61); Darien, Connecticut
- Occupation: Actress
- Years active: 2002–present
- Spouse: Matthew Scott Guthrie (1996–present)
- Children: 2

Kathleen Delaney (born March 5, 1965) is an American stage, voice actress, dancer and playwright who works on Broadway and on the properties of 4Kids Entertainment. She is best known as the voice of Hina in the 4Kids dub of One Piece, Mai Valentine in uncut versions of Yu-Gi-Oh! and Rouge in Sonic X and the succeeding games until 2010, when she was replaced by Karen Strassman.

== Voice roles ==
- Magical DoReMi – Petunia
- One Piece – Alvida, Hina (4Kids dub)
- Sonic the Hedgehog series – Rouge the Bat (US/EUR/NA)
- Ultimate Muscle – Jacqueline McMadd
- Viva Piñata – Tina Twingersnap
- Yu-Gi-Oh! – Mai Valentine (uncut DVDs)
- Yu-Gi-Oh! GX – Tania

== Theatrical roles ==
=== Acting credits ===
- Gypsy – Mazeppa
- Hamlet – Gertrude
- The Best Little Whorehouse in Texas – Ginger
- Alice in Wonderland – Queen of Hearts
- The Seagull – Arkadina
