= Channel Punjabi =

Canadian television channel

- Channel Punjabi logo
- Country: Canada
- Broadcast area: National
- Headquarters: Vancouver, British Columbia and Brampton, Ontario

Programming
- Picture format: 480i (SDTV)

Ownership
- Owner: Channel Punjabi Television

History
- Launched: September 24, 2009
- Former names: PTC Punjabi (2009-2011)

Links
- Website: channelpunjabi.ca

Channel Punjabi is a Canadian exempt Category B Punjabi-language specialty channel owned by Channel Punjabi Television Inc. It features a diverse range of programming, including news, music series, talk shows, religious programs, and sitcoms.

== History ==
In September 2006, Surjit S. Gill (owner of Channel Punjabi Television Inc.) was granted approval from the Canadian Radio-television and Telecommunications Commission (CRTC) to launch Channel Punjabi, described as "a national, general interest third-language ethnic Category 2 specialty programming service devoted primarily to the Punjabi-speaking community."

The channel launched in September 2009 as PTC Punjabi, a Canadian-branded affiliate of the Indian channel of the same name, on Rogers Cable. Programming on the channel was primarily sourced from PTC Punjabi in India and included news, variety shows, music series, and more.

Logo used as PTC Punjabi

The channel was rebranded as Channel Punjabi on January 26, Punjabi cinema Dish TV network on solar2011; while at that time, programming sourced from PTC Punjabi in India was removed from the channel. On a related note, the PTC Punjabi brand emerged in Canada once again in early 2011 when an unrelated company, Punjabi Maple Media Inc., launched their own PTC Punjabi-affiliated channel with the same name.

In March 2012, the channel made its first inroads in Western Canada by being launched on Shaw Cable, the country's largest cable television service provider in Western Canada; days later, the channel launched a second feed on a 3-hour time delay for viewers in Western Canada.

On July 24, 2012, the CRTC approved Channel Punjabi's request to convert from a licensed Category B specialty service to an exempted Cat. B third language service.

On October 2, 2012, Channel Punjabi started broadcasting live from Guru Nanak Gurdwara located in Surrey, BC, Canada. The daily live broadcast airs between 6pm - 7:30pm and is only available on the west coast feed for Shaw customers.

On January 26, 2013, Channel Punjabi Television signed a 3-year deal with Guru Nanak Sikh Gurdwara (Surrey, BC) which will give Channel Punjabi exclusive rights to broadcast the live daily feed from 6 pm to 7:30 pm daily and also broadcast events that will happen throughout the year at the Gurdwara.

On February 27, 2013, Channel Punjabi Television launched the "Ravinder Gill show" which is being filmed at Channel Punjabi's downtown studio. The host, Ravinder Gill, will be a hard hitting show that will feature news stories happening in Vancouver and across Canada affecting Punjabis, he will also have exclusive interviews. Channel Punjabi Television posted the first episode on their YouTube page.

On April 11, 2013, Channel Punjabi Television announced that they would be launching on Telus Optik TV on May 10 and will be on channel no. 557.
