= LS Times TV =

LS Times TV 龍祥頻道
- LS Times TV logo
- Country: Canada
- Broadcast area: National
- Headquarters: Richmond, British Columbia

Programming
- Picture format: 480i (SDTV); 1080i (HDTV)

Ownership
- Owner: Waylen Group (緯麟集團)

History
- Launched: October 2009

Links
- Website: LS Times TV (in Chinese)

LS Times TV is a Canadian exempt Category B specialty channel (Traditional Chinese: 龍祥頻道, Simplified Chinese: 龙祥频道) owned by Waylen Group (緯麟集團). LS Times TV is a national 24-hour TV station airing current feature films from Hong Kong, China, Taiwan and other Asian countries in their original language with Chinese subtitles, along with Canadian content, and daily news and popular TV programs from Asia.

== History ==
On October 25, 2007, Waylen Group, through its subsidiary L S Movie Channel Limited, was granted a licence by the Canadian Radio-television and Telecommunications Commission (CRTC) to operate L S Times. The channel officially launched in October 2009, on Rogers Cable under the name LS Times TV. On September 15, 2010, LS Times TV launched on Shaw Cable. On July 4, 2012, LS Times launched on Optik TV.

In July 2012, LS Times officially launched on Bell Satellite TV & Bell Fibe TV. As a result of these launches, LS Times is now available across the country via satellite for the very first time. It subsequently launched on Novus Cable on May 1, 2013 and on Cogeco in August 2013.

On August 30, 2013, the CRTC approved Waylen Group's request to convert LS Times TV from a licensed Category B specialty service to an exempted Cat. B third language service.

On January 17, 2017, LS Times transitioned to high-definition (HD) on Optik TV. The HD feed became available on Bell Fibe TV in February 2017.

== Programs ==
LS Times launched its first locally produced program Monday Forum in November 2013. The weekly 30-minute program allows for in-depth discussions on political, social and economic affairs with subject matter experts. Interviews are conducted in English, Cantonese or Mandarin.
