= Avis de Recherche =

Canadian French-language specialty channel

- Avis de Recherche logo
- Country: Canada
- Broadcast area: National
- Headquarters: Montreal, Quebec

Programming
- Picture format: 480i (SDTV)

Ownership
- Owner: Avis de Recherche Inc. (Vincent Géracitano)

History
- Launched: October 21, 2004
- Closed: November 16, 2022

Links
- Website: www.adr.tv

Avis de Recherche (AdR) was a Canadian French language Category B specialty channel devoted to crime prevention. Despite AdR's Category B licence, it was formerly a must-carry channel in the province of Quebec on digital basic cable.

== Programming and format ==
AdR was a specialty service dedicated to help law enforcement authorities; where viewers were invited to communicate any clues, tips and leads which might help police find missing persons or resolve criminal acts.

Programming on AdR came in the form of capsules or segments that vary from 30–60 seconds in length and feature bulletins from the police regarding various crimes, missing and/or wanted persons. This format repeated over a 24-hour period.

AdR also broadcast a daily live show about police activity, interviews with victims of crime, featurettes about public safety, and other clips filmed by its journalists.

== History ==
=== Origins ===
The idea of AdR was formed in 1999, when founder Vincent Géracitano's Montreal office was broken into. The thieves were caught on surveillance video and the tape was taken to the police. However, police did not have any way to broadcast the tape, and the case wasn't sensational enough to be carried in the mainstream news. This incident sparked the idea for Avis de Recherche.

In September 2002, Géracitano was granted approval by the Canadian Radio-television and Telecommunications Commission (CRTC), to operate a category 2 digital cable television channel called Avis de Recherche.

Two years after being granted approval, on October 21, 2004, AdR launched exclusively on Vidéotron in Quebec. Unlike most other specialty channels that collect a subscription fee from cable companies for distribution, AdR was initially paying Vidéotron, its only distributor, $0.02 per subscriber to be distributed on its digital basic system for free. The fee charged by the distributor eventually climbed to $0.05 per subscriber per month by early 2008. With 700,000 subscribers at that time on Videotron's digital cable at 5 cents each, combined with minimal sources of revenue, AdR was facing the inevitable. Géracitano had to mortgage his house to keep the channel running.

=== Mandatory carriage ===
In March 2007, AdR and several other current and new television licensees applied to either keep or gain mandatory digital basic cable status on all digital cable providers. In July 2007, AdR was approved as a must-carry service on digital cable in Quebec on the grounds that it is of "exceptional importance", with a subscription fee of $0.06 per subscriber and a mandate to spend 20% of its subscriber revenues on Canadian programming.

Later that year, Quebecor Media, owner of Vidéotron, appealed the decision to the Privy Council mainly on the grounds that the 6 cent increase would make the basic cable package unaffordable, thus violating the Broadcasting Act. This led the CRTC to reconsider its decision. However, in January 2008, the CRTC upheld its original decision with minor adjustments, including an increase from 20% to 43% expenditure of its subscription revenues on Canadian programming. Effective January 24, 2008, the CRTC's decision meant all digital television providers in Quebec must carry AdR as part of their digital basic package, and in response to this decision AdR decided to invest in new broadcast systems from MaestroVision, a Canadian provider of video solutions.

=== Loss of mandatory carriage ===
In January 2013, AdR filed a request with the CRTC to renew its mandatory carriage, whilst raising its carriage rate to $0.08 per subscriber. AdR justified its requested increase due mainly to inflation. Its rate of 6 cents was initially approved in 2007. The licence renewal would have fixed the rate until 2020. It also justified the increase due to the CRTC's demand that it closed-caption its entire schedule.

On 8 August, the CRTC renewed AdR's license until 2020, but denied the continued mandatory carriage. According to the CRTC, AdR had not been able to prove that it had been successful in improving safety, notably pointing to its low ratings. The mandatory carriage was extended until 31 August 2015, giving AdR two years to seek alternative sources of revenue.

Following this drop in income, AdR was forced to cut its budgets, laying off 10 of its 16 employees. Further layoffs left the channel with only three employees by February 2014.

On 15 January 2014, AdR filed another application to the CRTC, seeking the extension of the mandatory carriage for another three years, until 31 August 2018. On 4 April, the CRTC again denied the request, noting that there had been no changes in circumstances since its previous decision in August 2013.

With the deadline approaching, AdR filed additional legal challenges. In September 2015, AdR obtained a temporary injunction preventing VIdéotron from dropping the channel from its lineup, as the distribution agreement only expired at the end of the year. On 14 August, AdR filed a request for dispute resolution with the CRTC, alleging that by dropping AdR from its lineup, Bell Canada was giving undue preference to its own service, Canal D/Investigation. On 12 November, AdR filed a similar request against Vidéotron, alleging undue preference towards LCN. Both complaints were dismissed by the CRTC. With all legal avenues exhausted, Vidéotron ceased distributing AdR on 29 April 2016. Other cable providers soon followed.

=== Later years ===
On 13 November 2019, AdR had its broadcasting license revoked by the CRTC; the channel continued to operate as an exempt discretionary service.

On 16 November 2022, AdR announced on their Facebook page that they had ceased operations, blaming the CRTC's "inexplicable" decision for the channel's closure.

== Proposed English counterpart ==
In 2002, Vincent Géracitano obtained a broadcasting license from the CRTC for another channel, All Points Bulletin. The channel would have had a similar format to Avis de Recherche, but would broadcast in English and focus on crimes across Canada. In 2007, when AdR's initial mandatory carriage order was approved, a similar order for the yet-to-launch All Points Bulletin was denied, as the CRTC had doubts that the community-oriented service could succeed at a national level. Mandatory carriage was again proposed and denied in 2013. All Points Bulletin's license was ultimately revoked in on 15 November 2019, two days after AdR's, without the channel having ever launched.
