= Chakde TV =

- Chakde TV logo
- Country: Canada
- Broadcast area: National
- Headquarters: Calgary, Alberta

Ownership
- Owner: Rhysley Group.

History
- Launched: March 15, 2015

Links
- Website: Chakde TV

Chakde TV is a Canadian exempt Category B Punjabi language specialty channel that is owned by Server Center Limited. It broadcasts entertainment and news programming in Punjabi. The station broadcasts from its studio in southwest Calgary. Approximately 70 to 80 percent of the station's content is produced in Canada.
