= ProSiebenSat.1 Welt =

ProSiebenSat1 Welt (P7S1 Welt)
- Country: Germany
- Broadcast area: North America
- Headquarters: Unterföhring, Germany

Programming
- Picture format: 480i (4:3 SDTV)

Ownership
- Owner: ProSiebenSat.1 Media
- Sister channels: kabel eins, ProSieben, Sat.1

History
- Launched: February 2005; 20 years ago
- Closed: 31 December 2023; 17 months ago

Links
- Website: www.prosiebensat1welt.com

ProSiebenSat1 Welt (styled as P7S1 Welt as of January 2020) was a German-language television channel developed for North American audiences.

The channel offered old and current programming selections from the commercial German television channels Sat.1, ProSieben, kabel eins, ProSieben Maxx, Sat.1 Gold and sixx, which are owned by ProSiebenSat.1 Media. The channel went on the air in February 2005 and was available via the satellite provider Dish Network and select cable companies, often offered as part of a German Language Package together with the public German state-owned Deutsche Welle network. ProSiebenSat1 Welt was also available in Canada through a partnership with Ethnic Channels Group.

The ProSiebenSat.1 Welt channel ceased operations at the end of 2023.

== Shows ==
=== Current Shows ===
- Abenteuer Alltag – Jetzt bauen wir!
- Abenteuer Alltag – so leben wir Deutschen
- Abenteuer Leben – täglich Wissen
- Achtung Kontrolle! – Einsatz für die Ordnungshüter
- Achtung Notaufnahme
- Akte 20.17
- All About You — Das Fashion Duell
- Alpenstar TV
- Anna und die Liebe
- Anwälte im Einsatz
- Auf die Plätze! Fertig! Weg!
- Auf Streife
- BeefBattle - Duell am Grill
- Britt – Der Talk um eins
- Das große Backen
- Der Bulle von Tölz
- Der Glücksvollzieher
- Deine Chance! 3 Bewerber – 1 Job
- Deutschlands größte Kriminalfälle
- Die 2 - Anwälte mit Herz
- Die Anstalt – Zurück ins Leben
- Die Dreisten Drei – jetzt noch dreister
- Die Ruhrpottwache
- Die Straßen von Berlin
- Die Wunderbare Welt der Tierbaby
- Do it Yourself – S.O.S.
- EDGE Action Sports World
- Einsatz in Köln - Die Kommissare
- Extreme
- Flames - Geschmack ist alles
- Follow us! Das ProSieben-Reportermagazin
- Frank: der Weddingplaner
- Freunde - Das Leben beginnt
- Galileo
- Hilfe - Ich bin pleite! Letzte Rettung Pfandleiher
- In Gefahr - Ein verhängnisvoller Moment
- Inside mit Stefan Gödde
- Inspektor Rolle
- Jetzt wird's schräg
- Kampf der Köche
- Karawane der Köche
- K1 Magazin
- K1 Reportage
- K11 – Kommissare im Einsatz
- Kiss Bang Love
- Lenßen & Partner
- Maddin in Love
- Mannsbilder
- Mein Lokal, Dein Lokal
- Mein Mann, sein Hobby und Ich
- Mein neues Leben (und: Mein neues Leben – XXL
- Mein großer dicker peinlicher Verlobter
- Messer, Gabel, herz - Das Blind-Date Dinner
- Mission Wahnsinn - Für Geld zum Held
- Niedrig und Kuhnt – Kommissare ermitteln
- Pain & Fame - Wer wird Deutschlands bester Tätowierer?
- Paula kommt - Sex und Gute Nacktgeschichten
- Patchwork Family
- Reality Affairs
- Restaurant Startup
- Rosins Restaurant
- Richter Alexander Hold
- Risky Quiz
- Sat.1 Reportage
- Schicksale - und plötzlich ist alles anders
- SK Kölsch
- Sweet & Easy - Enie backt — Das Foodmagazin
- taff
- Uncovered
- Verdächtig
- Verrückt nach Clara
- Weibsbilder
- We Are Family! So lebt Deutschland
- Yvonne Willicks räumt auf
- Zieh mich an!
- Zwischen Meer und Maloche

=== Former Shows ===
- 24 Stunden – My Story
- Abenteuer Auto
- Abenteuer Natur
- Akte – Reporter decken auf
- Alles außer Sex
- alphateam – Die Lebensretter im OP
- Avenzio – Schöner leben!
- Der Bergdoktor
- Besser Essen – Leben leicht gemacht
- Bim Bam Bino
- BIZZ
- Bundesliga
- Clever! – Die Show, die Wissen schafft
- Danni Lowinski
- Darf man das?
- Edel & Starck
- Extreme Activity
- Das Fast Food-Duell
- Focus TV
- Freunde wie wir
- Galileo Mystery
- Genial daneben – Die Comedy Arena
- Der Glücksvollzieher
- GoldStar TV
- Granaten wie wir
- GSG 9 – Ihr Einsatz ist ihr Leben
- Gülcans Traumhochzeit
- Hallo, Onkel Doc!
- Hand aufs Herz
- Ein Job – Deine Chance
- Job-Duell – Die Chance deines Lebens
- Julia Leischik sucht: Bitte melde dich
- Die Jugendberaterin
- Jugendcoach Oliver Lück
- Kalkofes Mattscheibe
- Kleine Hunde — Großes Chaos
- Kurklinik Rosenau
- Ladyland
- Lebe Deinen Traum! Jetzt wird alles anders
- Der letzte Bulle
- Liebe isst – Das Single Dinner
- Lotta in Love
- Das Model und der Freak
- Ein Mord für Quandt
- N24 Nachrichten für ProSiebenSat.1 Welt
- N24 Wissen
- Nur die Liebe zählt
- Parkhotel Stern
- Popstars
- ProSieben Reportage
- Quatsch Comedy Club
- Richterin Barbara Salesch
- R.I.S. – Die Sprache der Toten
- SAM
- Schatz, mach` du mal meinen Job!
- Schillerstraße
- Sechserpack
- Sommer und Bolten: Gute Ärzte, keine Engel
- Der Staatsfeind
- Stromberg
- Studio 24
- Switch Reloaded
- Tamme Hanken - Der Knochenbrecher on tour
- TRAMITZ and friends
- TV total
- Unsolved
- Verliebt in Berlin
- Der Welpentrainer
- Wolffs Revier
- Wolkenstein
- Zacherl: Einfach kochen
- Zwei bei Kallwass

== See also ==
- ProSiebenSat.1 Welt Canada
