= WOWtv =

Canadian Chinese-language specialty channel

- WOWtv logo

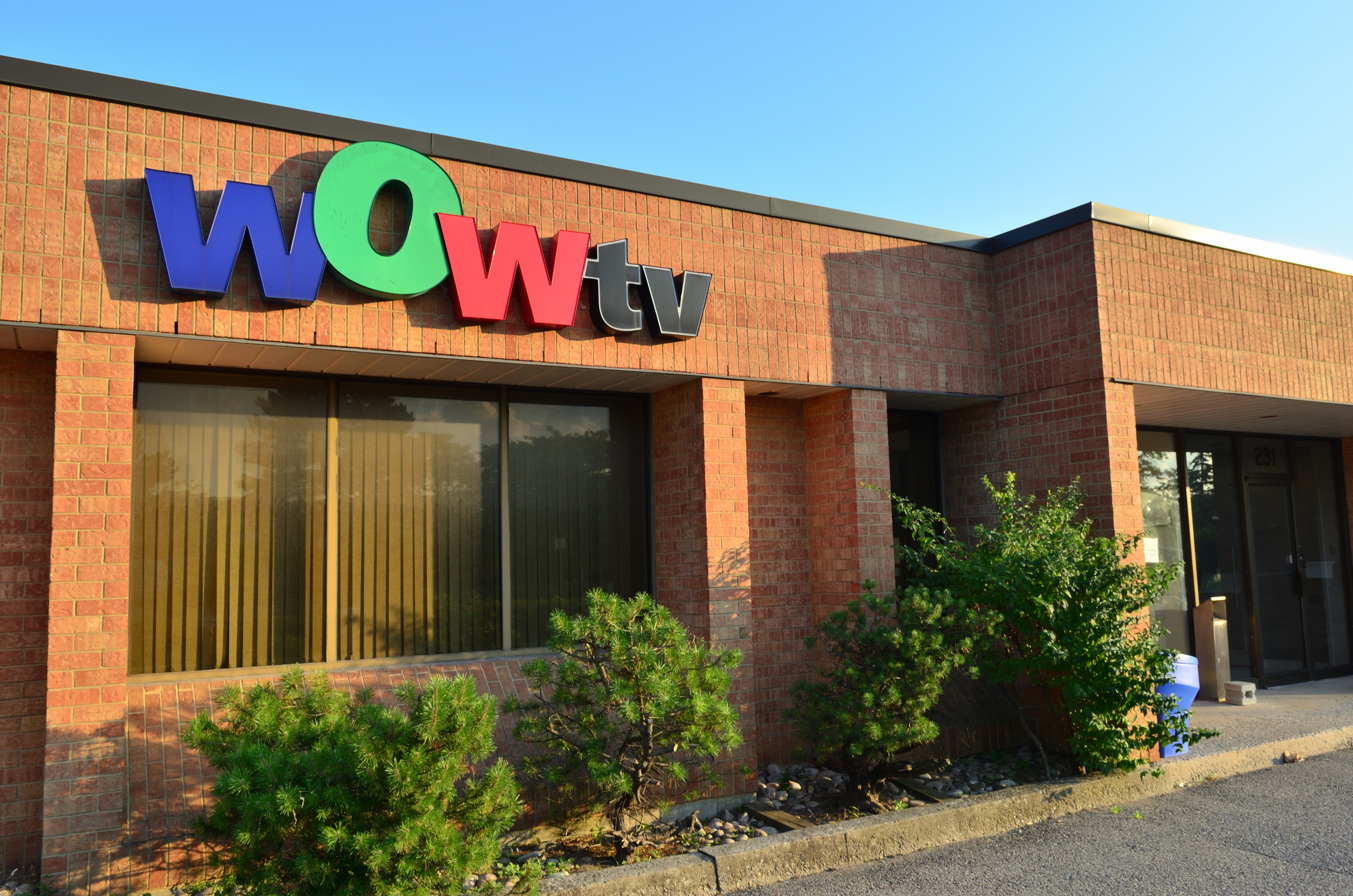
- WOWtv Markham headquarters
- Country: Canada
- Broadcast area: National
- Headquarters: Markham, Ontario

Programming
- Picture format: 480i (SDTV); 1080i (HDTV)

Ownership
- Owner: Canadian Chinese Media Network

History
- Launched: April 29, 2009

Links
- Website: WOWtv (in Chinese)

Availability

Streaming media
- Ustream: Ustream

WOWtv is a Canadian exempt Category B Chinese language specialty channel and is owned by Canadian Chinese Media Network (CCMN). WOWtv broadcasts programming in Cantonese, Mandarin and Vietnamese from predominantly foreign sources as well as local Canadian programming.

The channel launched on April 29, 2009, exclusively on Rogers Cable. On December 2, 2009, WOWtv launched a high-definition (HD) channel called WOWtv HD, which simulcast the standard definition feed, on Rogers Cable. In June 2010, WOWtv HD launched on Bell Fibe TV. On September 25, 2012, WOWtv launched their western feed to Vancouver, Calgary and Edmonton via Telus Optik TV.

WOW TV head office is now in Markham moved from the original Toronto (Agincourt) studios.
