= Melody Drama =

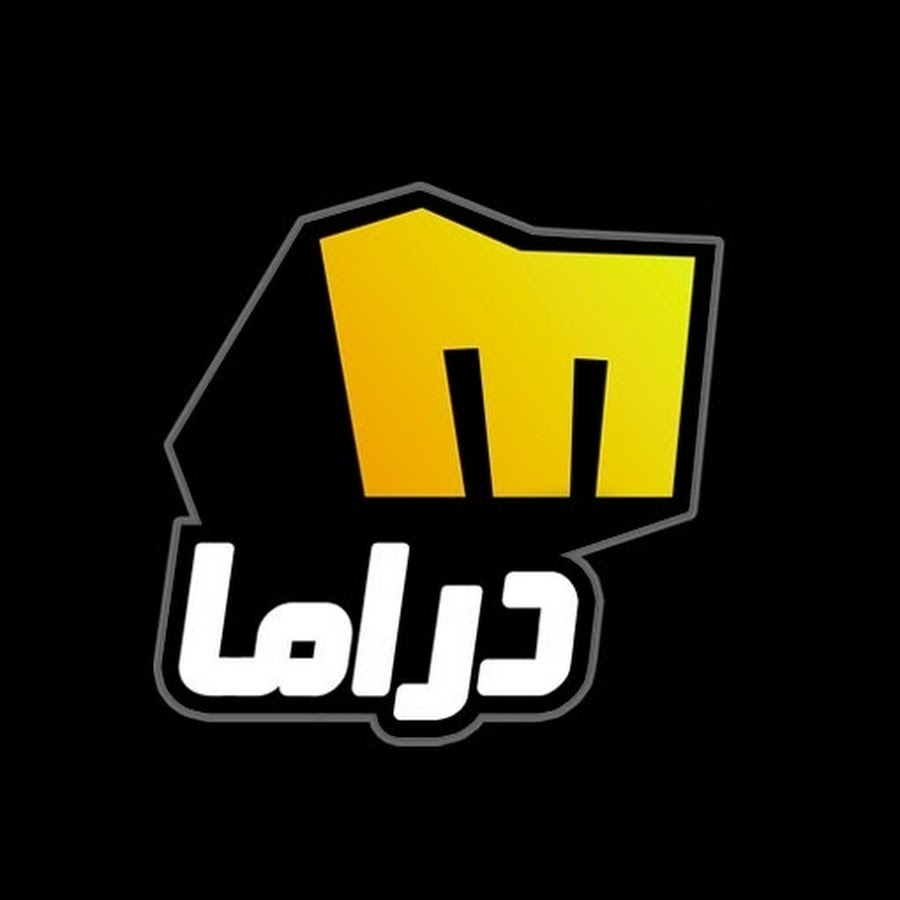
- Melody Drama logo (October 2009)
- Country: Egypt
- Broadcast area: Middle East, Canada
- Headquarters: Cairo, Egypt

Programming
- Picture format: 576i (SDTV)

Ownership
- Owner: Melody Interactive (Egyptian version); Ethnic Channels Group (Canadian version) (name licensed by Melody Interactive)

History
- Launched: 17 October 2009; 16 years ago
- Closed: 28 April 2013; 13 years ago

Melody Drama (Arabic: ميلودي دراما) was an Egyptian-Canadian exempt Category B Arabic language specialty channel and was owned by Ethnic Channels Group. It broadcast programming from Melody Drama as well as local Canadian content.

== Background ==
Melody Drama was a top rated entertainment channel from Egypt featuring popular Arabic television series including comedies and dramas.

The Melody TV network was owned by Gamal Marwan, son of Ashraf Marwan. The network ceased to exist by 2013 due to financial difficulties.
