= Discretionary service =

Canadian classification for cable TV channels

A discretionary service is a Canadian specialty channel which, as defined by the Canadian Radio-television and Telecommunications Commission, may be carried optionally by all subscription television providers. It replaces the previous category A, category B, category C (instead split into the categories of "mainstream sports" and "national news"), and premium classifications.

Discretionary services may air programming from any of the CRTC's defined categories, although no more than 10% of programming per month may be devoted to live professional sports. Discretionary services may be authorized to offer multiplex channels.

== Background ==
=== Prior classifications and genre exclusivity ===
The CRTC previously licensed specialty television services into one of three categories, which determined their regulatory obligations (such as the types of programming they may offer, and whether they are allowed to compete with other specialty television services), and how they may be distributed by television providers—known legally as broadcast distribution undertakings (BDUs). Prior to 2015, there were three types of specialty channel licenses

- Category A services: a category established in 2011 that encompassed the legacy "analog" specialty and premium television channels licensed prior to the establishment of digital cable and satellite (such as MuchMusic and Family Channel), and "Category 1" digital specialty services. Digital BDUs were required to offer all Category A-licensed channels as part of their services. Category A services were licensed within specific scopes, and subject to "genre protection": no other specialty services were allowed to directly compete with a Category A service. As a consequence, Category A licenses carried more stringent obligations on their owners, such as stricter thresholds for the exhibition of specific types of programming and Canadian content.
  - Major pay television services were designated as "premium" services; these services were prohibited from carrying commercial advertising, but were allowed to operate multiple "multiplex" channels consistent with their nature of service.
- Category B services (formerly "Category 2"): digital specialty services that were licensed to carry narrower, niche formats in comparison to Category A-licensed channels. BDUs were not obligated to offer all Category B services, and negotiated with their distributors for carriage. Category B services were allowed to compete between each other, but could not compete directly with Category A services.
- Category C services encompassed "competitive Canadian specialty services operating in the genres of mainstream sports and national news", which had been given an exemption from the genre protection rules in 2009 that allowed them more flexibility in programming and formats.

=== Reforms and discontinuation of genre exclusivity rules ===
As part of "Let's Talk TV", a CRTC initiative to reform Canada's broadcasting industry, the Commission announced in 2015 that it would phase out its previous "genre protection" rules, which forbade services with Category B licenses from directly competing with those with Category A licenses. The Commission felt that these restrictions were "no longer needed to ensure programming diversity between services", as "[they] limited programming services to offering certain types of programming and precluded other services from offering that programming." As part of these changes, the CRTC began transitioning all pay and specialty services to standardized conditions of license.

In November 2016, per a request by DHX Media (owner of Family Channel—a network that was licensed as a premium service, but had largely been treated as a non-premium specialty service by television providers), the previous premium television designation was also removed, merging them into the discretionary services category and allowing them to, if they choose, transition to advertising-supported formats. The standard conditions of license were thus amended to allow discretionary services to offer multiplex channels if approved as a condition of license.

== List of licensed discretionary services ==
=== Former Category A services ===
Category A services were those which had mandatory distribution by all licensed broadcast distribution undertakings. They consisted of the channels that were licensed before the emergence of digital cable, as well as the narrow tier of digital services which were originally licensed as "Category 1" (must-carry) when digital cable was first introduced.

==== English former Category A services ====
- AMI-tv
- BNN
- Bravo
- Cartoon Network
- CMT
- Cottage Life
- CP24 (GTA)
- Crime + Investigation
- CPAC (English feed)
- CTV Comedy Channel
- CTV Drama Channel
- CTV Life Channel
- CTV Sci-Fi Channel
- DTour
- E!
- Flavour Network
- The History Channel
- History2
- Home Network
- Much
- One
- OutTV
- Showcase
- Slice
- Sportsnet 360
- The Weather Network
- T+E
- Treehouse
- USA Network
- VisionTV
- W Network
- YTV

==== French former Category A services ====
- addikTV
- Canal D
- Canal Vie
- CPAC (French feed)
- Elle Fictions
- Évasion
- Historia
- Ici ARTV
- Max
- MétéoMédia
- RDS Info
- Séries+
- Télétoon
- TV5
  - Unis
- Z

==== Third-language former Category A services ====
- ATN Star Plus
- Fairchild TV
- Odyssey
- Talentvision
- Telelatino

=== Former Category B services ===
Category B services were those which had only optional, rather than mandatory, carriage rights on BDUs, and did not have format protection.

==== English former Category B services ====
- Adult Swim
- ATN Cricket Plus
- ATN DD Sports
- BBC Earth
- BBC First
- Boomerang
- CBN
- CTV Nature Channel
- CTV Speed Channel
- CTV Wild Channel
- Daystar Television Canada
- DejaView
- EuroWorld Sport
- Fight Network
- FNTSY Sports Network
- FX
- FXX
- GameTV
- Global News: BC 1
- Hollywood Suite
  - Hollywood Suite 70s Movies
  - Hollywood Suite 80s Movies
  - Hollywood Suite 90s Movies
  - Hollywood Suite 00s Movies
- HPItv
  - HPItv Canada
  - HPItv International
  - HPItv Odds
  - HPItv West
- Lifetime
- Love Nature
- Makeful
- MovieTime
- Nat Geo Wild
- National Geographic
- NBA TV Canada
- Oxygen
- Penthouse TV
- Playmen TV
- Red Hot TV
- Rewind
- Salt + Light Television
- Silver Screen Classics
- Smithsonian Channel
- Sportsnet World
- Stingray Naturescape
- The Rural Channel
- Wild TV
- World Fishing Network

==== French former Category B services ====
- Avis de Recherche
- Casa
- Frissons TV
- Ici Explora
- Investigation
- Prise 2
- QUB (Formerly Yoopa)
- Témoin
- Vivid TV Canada
- Zeste

==== Third-language former Category B services ====
- Aaj Tak
- All TV
- ATN Food Food
- ATN SAB TV
- ATN Sony TV
- ATN Times Now
- ATN Zoom
- Fairchild TV 2 HD
- FPTV
- Filmy
- Mediaset Italia
- Mediaset TGCOM 24
- MEGA Cosmos
- New Tang Dynasty Television
- SSTV
- Telebimbi
- TeleNiños
- Travelxp
- Univision Canada
- ZEE Bollywood
- Zee Cinema
- Zee TV Canada
- Zing

=== National news and sports discretionary services ===
==== English national news and sports discretionary services ====
===== English news discretionary services =====
- CBC News Network
- CTV News Channel
- The News Forum

===== English sports discretionary services =====
- Sportsnet
  - Sportsnet East
  - Sportsnet Ontario
  - Sportsnet Pacific
  - Sportsnet West
- Sportsnet One
  - Sportsnet Flames
  - Sportsnet Oilers
  - Sportsnet Vancouver Hockey
- TSN
  - TSN1
  - TSN2
  - TSN3
  - TSN4
  - TSN5

==== French national news and sports discretionary services ====
===== French news discretionary services =====
- Ici RDI
- LCN

===== French sports discretionary services =====
- RDS
  - RDS2
- TVA Sports
  - TVA Sports 2

=== Former exempted services ===
- Disney Channel
- Stingray Hits!

=== French premium services ===
- Crave (Four multiplex channels)
  - HBO Canada (East and west)
- Super Channel (Four multiplex channels)
  - Super Channel Fuse
  - Super Channel Heart & Home
  - Super Channel Vault
  - Super Channel Quest
- Super Écran (Four Multiplex Channels)
- Starz (Two multiplex channels)

== Exempted discretionary services ==
Services with less than 200,000 subscribers that would otherwise meet the definition of a discretionary service, and services which air 90% of their programming in a "third language (a language other than English, French, or those of Canadian aboriginal peoples), are exempted from formal licensing by the CRTC. They must still comply with standard conditions of license published by the CRTC, maintain a file with the Commission, and, if this is the basis of their exemption, begin to pursue an application for licensing if they exceed 200,000 subscribers.

=== English ===
- ABS-CBN News Channel (ANC)
- AOV Adult Movie Channel
- beIN Sports Canada
- The Cult Movie Network
- Discovery Channel
- Exxxtasy TV
- FEVA TV
- Food Network
- HGTV
- Investigation Discovery
- Magnolia Network
- Maleflixxx Television
- MAVTV Canada
- OneSoccer
- Stingray Country
- Stingray Juicebox
- Stingray Loud
- Stingray Retro
- Stingray Now 4K
- Stingray Vibe
- Toon-A-Vision
- Vertical TV
- Vintage TV
- XXX Action Clips Channel

=== Third-language ===
- Abu Dhabi TV
- AksyonTV International
- Al-Nahar TV
- Al-Nahar Drama
- Al Resalah
- All TV K
- ATN Aastha TV
- ATN Alpha ETC Punjabi
- ATN ARY Digital
- ATN B4U Movies
- ATN B4U Music
- ATN Bangla
- ATN Brit Asia TV
- ATN Colors Bangla
- ATN Colors Marathi
- ATN DD Bharati
- ATN DD Urdu
- ATN Gujarati
- ATN IBC Tamil
- ATN Jaya TV
- ATN Movies
- ATN MTV India
- ATN News 18
- ATN PM One
- ATN Punjabi 5
- ATN Punjabi News
- ATN Punjabi Plus
- ATN Rishtey
- ATN Sikh Channel
- ATN Sony Aath
- ATN Sony Max
- ATN Sony Mix
- ATN Star Jalsha
- ATN SVBC
- ATN Tamil Plus
- ATN Urdu
- BBC Arabic
- Big Magic International
- Canada Chinese TV
- Canada National TV
- CCCTV
- Chakde TV
- Channel 9 Canada
- Channel Punjabi
- Channel Y
- Cinema One Global
- CTC International
- Detskiy
- Dream 2
- ERT World
- Fairchild TV 2
- FTV
- First National
- GMA Life TV
- GMA News TV
- GMA Pinoy TV
- Greek Music Channel
- Halla Bol!
- HRT Sat
- Hum TV
- Iran TV Network
- Kapatid Channel International
- KHL-TV
- LS Times TV
- Melody Aflam
- Melody Drama
- Melody Hits
- Momo Kids
- Montreal Greek TV
- NGTV
- Nova World
- OSN Ya Hala International
- Prime Asia TV
- ProSiebenSat.1 Welt
- PTC Punjabi
- Rawal TV
- RBTI Canada
- Rotana Aflam
- Rotana Cinema
- Rotana Classic
- Rotana Clip
- Rotana Khalijiah
- Rotana Masriya
- Rotana Mousica
- RTL Living
- RTS Sat
- RTVi
- Russian Illuzion
- SBTN
- Schlager TV
- TET
- Tamil One
- Tamil Vision
- The Filipino Channel (TFC)
- The Israeli Network
- Toronto 360 TV
- TVCentr International
- TVP Info
- TV Rain
- Vanakkam TV
- Win HD Caribbean
- WOWtv
- Zee 24 Taas
- Zee Bangla
- Zee Marathi
- Zee Punjabi
- Zee Salaam
- Zee Talkies
- Zee Tamil

== See also ==
- Digital television in Canada
- List of Canadian specialty channels
- List of Canadian television channels
- List of Canadian television networks
- List of foreign television channels available in Canada
- List of television stations in Canada by call sign
- List of United States television stations available in Canada
- Multichannel television in Canada
