= Iran TV Network (Canada) =

- Iran TV Network logo
- Country: Canada
- Broadcast area: National
- Headquarters: Toronto, Ontario

Programming
- Picture format: 480i (SDTV)

Ownership
- Owner: Ethnic Channels Group (name licensed by Hily Media)

History
- Launched: Early 2006
- Former names: Jaam-e-Jam (2010-2015)

Iran TV Network (ITN) is a Canadian exempt Category B Persian language specialty channel. It is wholly owned by Ethnic Channels Group with its name and programming used under license from the American-based TV channel Iran TV Network.

ITN is a general entertainment service, it airs programming aimed at the entire family including news, dramas, reality series, music, sports and more.

== History ==
In November 2004, Ethnic Channels Group was granted approval from the Canadian Radio-television and Telecommunications Commission (CRTC) to launch a television channel called Persian/Iranian TV, described as "a national ethnic Category 2 specialty programming undertaking devoted to providing programming primarily to the Persian-, Azeri-, Kurdish-, Armenian- and Assyrian-speaking communities."

The channel was launched in early 2006 as Iran TV Network (ITN) and featured programming from US-based channel, Iran TV Network. In early 2010, the channel was renamed Jaam-e-Jam and began featuring programming from Jaam-e-Jam International in Iran. In May 2015, the channel was renamed 'Iran TV Network' once again due to loss of programming from Jaam-e-Jam.

On August 30, 2013, the CRTC approved Ethnic Channels Group's request to convert Jaam-e-Jam from a licensed Category B specialty service to an exempted Cat. B third language service.

In 2020, both Bell Fibe TV and Telus TV, the only providers that carried the channel, dropped it from their line-ups, rendering the channel no longer available. It continues to broadcast on satellite and is available throughout North America as well as parts of Europe, North Africa, Middle East and Asia.
