= ProSiebenSat.1 Welt (Canada) =

- ProSiebenSat.1 Welt logo
- Country: Canada
- Broadcast area: National
- Headquarters: Toronto, Ontario

Programming
- Picture format: 480i (SDTV)

Ownership
- Owner: Ethnic Channels Group (name licensed by ProSiebenSat.1 Media)

History
- Launched: June 2006
- Closed: December 2023

ProSiebenSat1 Welt was a Canadian exempt Category B German language specialty channel. It was wholly owned by Ethnic Channels Group, with its name used under license from ProSiebenSat.1 Media, owners of ProSiebenSat.1 Welt. The channel sourced the majority of its programming from ProSiebenSat.1 Welt, in addition to locally produced Canadian content.

== History ==
In April 2006, Ethnic Channels Group was granted approval from the Canadian Radio-television and Telecommunications Commission (CRTC) to launch a television channel called German TV, described as "a national, third-language, general interest, ethnic Category 2 specialty programming service devoted to the German-speaking community."

The channel launched in June 2006 under the name ProSiebenSat1 Welt.

The channel ceased operations December 31, 2023, when the parent channel in Germany shut down.

== Programming ==
ProSiebenSat1 Welt broadcast entertainment programming including movies, music shows, television dramas and comedies, and more. Programming was derived from ProSiebenSat.1 Media's six channels that formed the base for ProSiebenSat.1 Welt in the United States: Kabel Eins, ProSieben, Sat.1, sixx, Sat.1 Gold and ProSieben Maxx.

On November 4, 2014, the CRTC approved Ethnic Channel Group's request to convert ProSiebenSat1 Welt from a licensed Category B specialty service to an exempted Cat. B third language service.
