= Melody Hits =

Canadian Arabic-language specialty TV channel

- Melody Hits logo (August 2006)
- Country: Egypt
- Broadcast area: Middle East, Canada
- Headquarters: Cairo, Egypt

Programming
- Picture format: 576i (SDTV)

Ownership
- Owner: Melody Interactive (Egyptian version); Ethnic Channels Group (Canadian version) (name licensed by Melody Interactive)

History
- Launched: October 2002; 23 years ago
- Closed: 28 April 2013; 13 years ago
- Former names: Melody Arabia (February–November 2011) (Canadian version only)

Melody Hits (Arabic: ميلودي هيتس) was an Egyptian-Canadian exempt Category B Arabic language specialty channel owned by Ethnic Channels Group. It broadcast programming from Melody Hits in addition to local Canadian content.

== Background ==
Melody Arabia logo (August 2006)

The Canadian version of the channel originally launched as Melody Arabia (Arabic: ميلودي أرابيا) but was subsequently re-branded as Melody Hits in November 2011.

Melody Hits was a music channel from Egypt featuring hits from the Arab world and international artists. It aired non-stop video clips as well as fashion and lifestyle programming. It also featured an interactive component that allowed viewers to request their favorite music videos.

The Melody TV network was owned by Gamal Marwan, son of Ashraf Marwan. The network ceased to exist by 2013 due to financial difficulties.
