= Filipino TV =

Canadian exempt Category B Tagalog language specialty channel

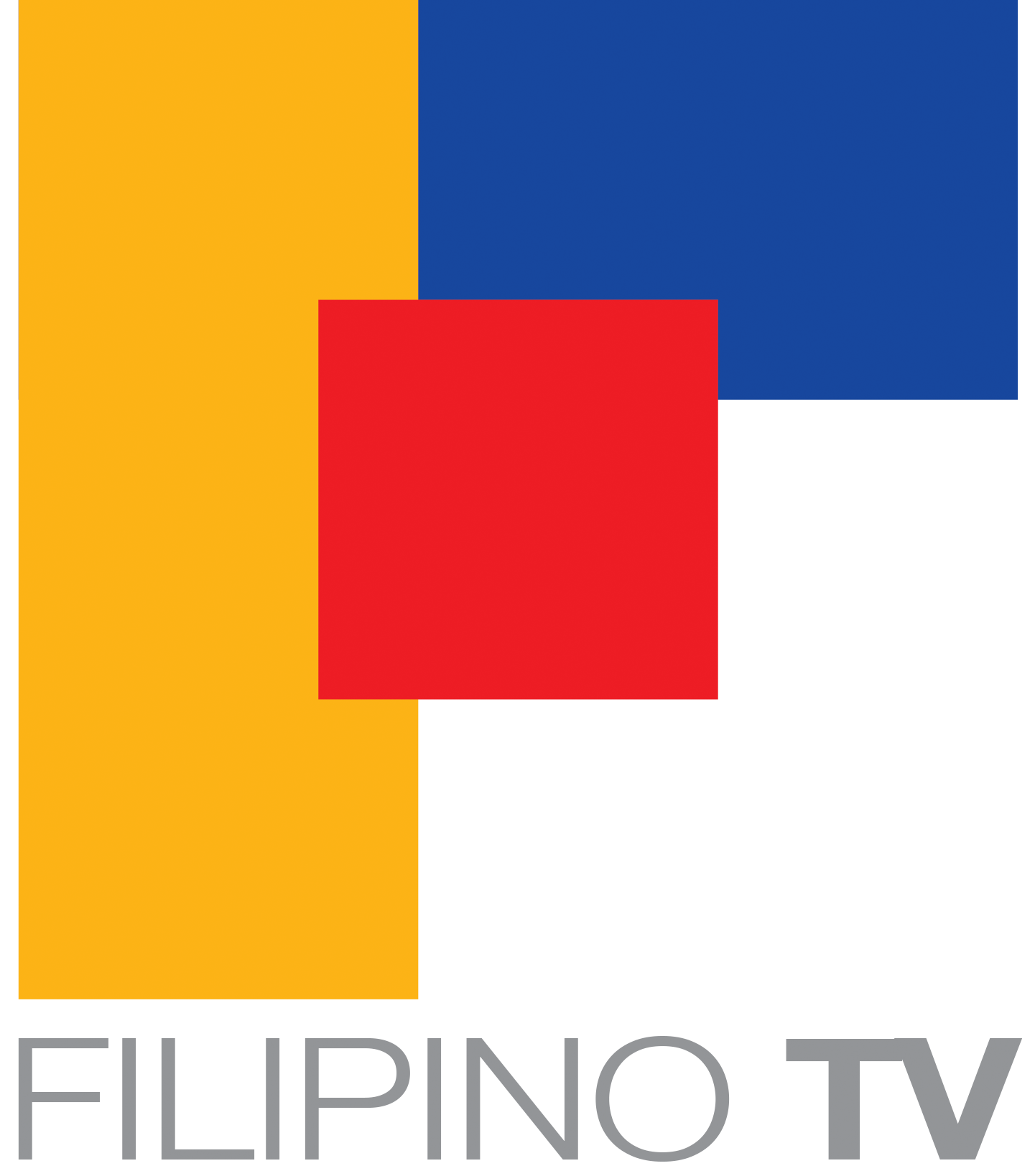
- Filipino TV logo
- Country: Canada
- Broadcast area: National
- Headquarters: 120 Amber Street Markham, Ontario

Programming
- Language: Filipino
- Picture format: 480i (SDTV)

Ownership
- Owner: Ethnic Channels Group

History
- Launched: June 23, 2004; 21 years ago
- Former names: ECG Filipino (2004–2005); The Mabuhay Channel (2005–2008)

Links
- Website: www.myfilipinotv.com

Filipino TV (FTV) is a Canadian exempt Category B Tagalog language specialty channel and is owned by Ethnic Channels Group (ECG). It broadcasts news and public affairs from the Philippines and locally produce Canadian content on a daily basis.

== History ==
Old Filipino TV Logo

Logo used as Filipino TV (2008-2016)

Logo used while under the name The Mabuhay Channel

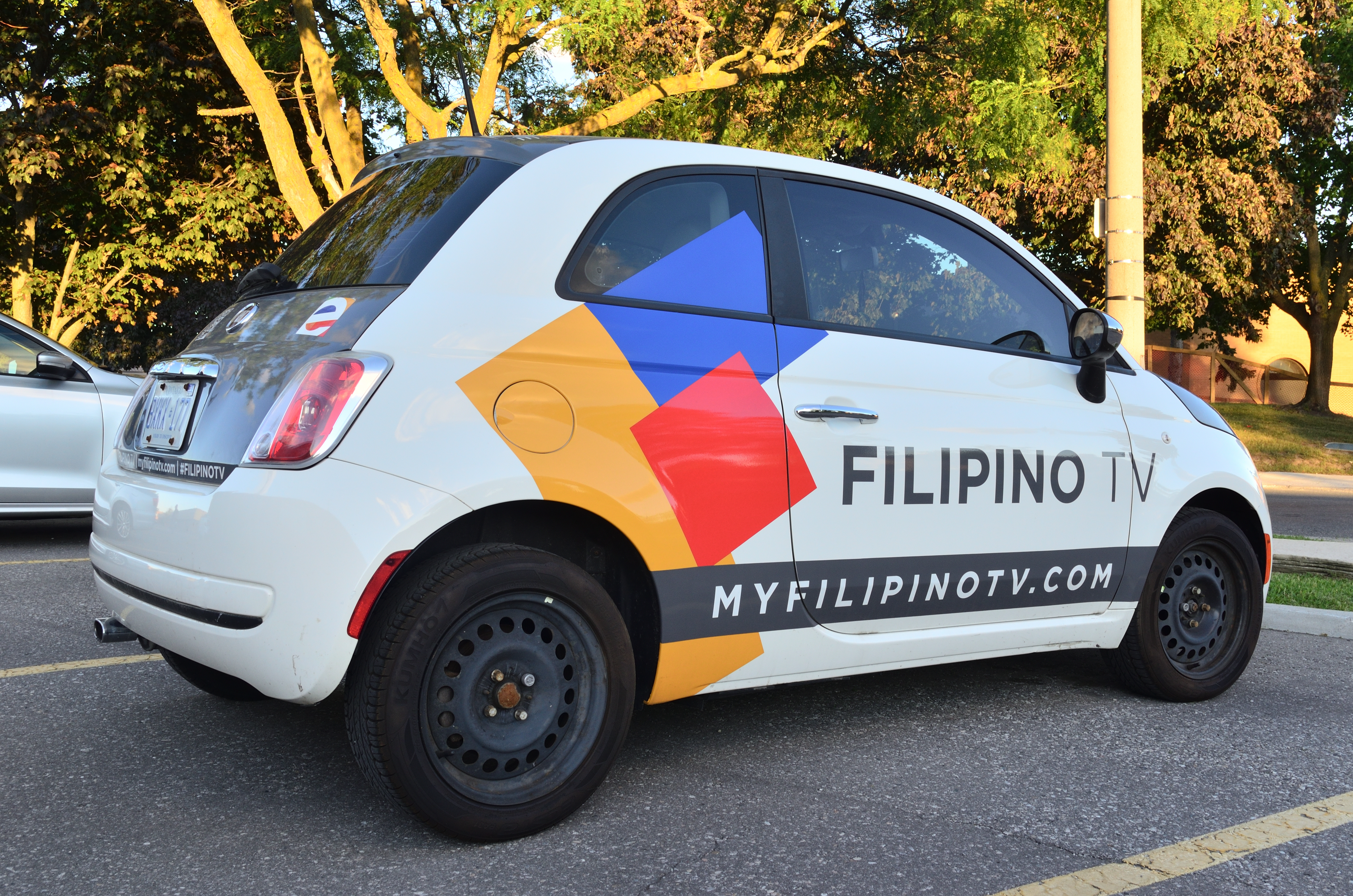
Vehicle with current logo at Filipino TV HQ.

In September 2003, ECG was granted approval from the Canadian Radio-television and Telecommunications Commission (CRTC) to launch a specialty channel called Filipino TV, described as "an ethnic Category 2 specialty television service... targeting the Filipino-speaking community."

The channel launched on June 23, 2004, along with 3 other channels from ECG, initially on Rogers Cable. It launched under the name ECG Filipino and featured programming from now-defunct Pinoy Central TV. In late 2005, the channel was renamed The Mabuhay Channel Canada via an agreement with The Mabuhay Channel, a new Filipino channel that had launched in the United States. The Mabuhay Channel was a partnership of five different Filipino broadcasters: ABC Channel 5 (now TV5), NBN Channel 4 (now PTV), IBC Channel 13, CCI Asia Group (ISLA & Juice), and Viva Entertainment. It was created exclusively for Filipinos living abroad by Philippine Multimedia Systems Inc. (PMSI), the only DTH satellite broadcaster in the Philippines.

In August 2008, The Mabuhay Channel was dropped by Dish Network, the only provider who carried the channel in the US. As a result of this, the channel ceased broadcasting and on August 18, 2008. Ethnic Channels Group re-branded the channel yet again this time calling it FTV- Filipino TV.

Coinciding with the launch of Filipino TV, Ethnic Channels announced a partnership with Filipino-Canadian production company Minerva Studio, whereby Minerva would produce several original productions for FTV.

On November 4, 2014, the CRTC approved Ethnic Channel Group's request to convert Filipino TV from a licensed Category B specialty service to an exempted category B third language service.

In December 2016, the channel underwent a rebranding, introducing a new logo and additional programming including locally produced programming from all provinces.
