= Abu Dhabi TV (Canada) =

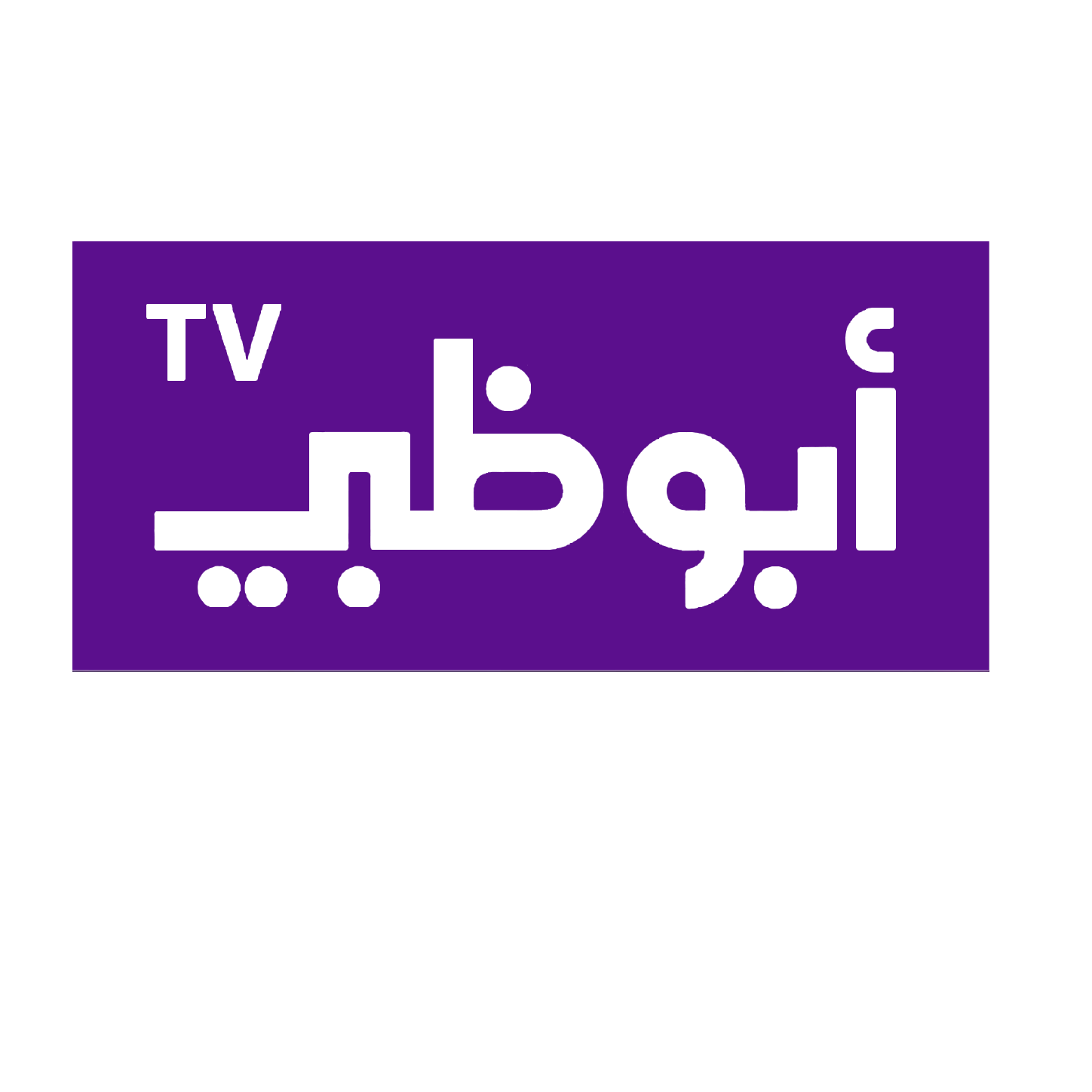
- Abu Dhabi TV logo
- Country: Canada
- Broadcast area: National
- Headquarters: Toronto, Ontario

Programming
- Picture format: 480i (SDTV)

Ownership
- Owner: Ethnic Channels Group (name licensed by Abu Dhabi Media)

History
- Launched: 9 November 2005; 19 years ago

Links
- Website: Abu Dhabi TV

Abu Dhabi TV is a Canadian exempt Category B Arabic language specialty channel and is wholly owned by Ethnic Channels Group. The channel name is used under license from Abu Dhabi Media, the owners of the Emirati-based channel, Abu Dhabi TV.

Abu Dhabi TV broadcasts programming primarily from Abu Dhabi TV, in addition to Canadian content. It features a wide variety of programming including news, current affairs, sports, films, and more.

== History ==
In September 2003, Ethnic Channels Group was granted approval from the Canadian Radio-television and Telecommunications Commission (CRTC) to launch a television channel called Arabic TV, described as "a national ethnic Category 2 specialty television service providing a programming service primarily in the Arabic language."

Original logo (2005–2006)

The channel launched on November 9, 2005 as Abu Dhabi TV on Rogers Cable.

On August 30, 2013, the CRTC approved Ethnic Channels Group's request to convert Abu Dhabi TV from a licensed Category B specialty service to an exempted Cat. B third language service.
