= RTVi (Canada) =

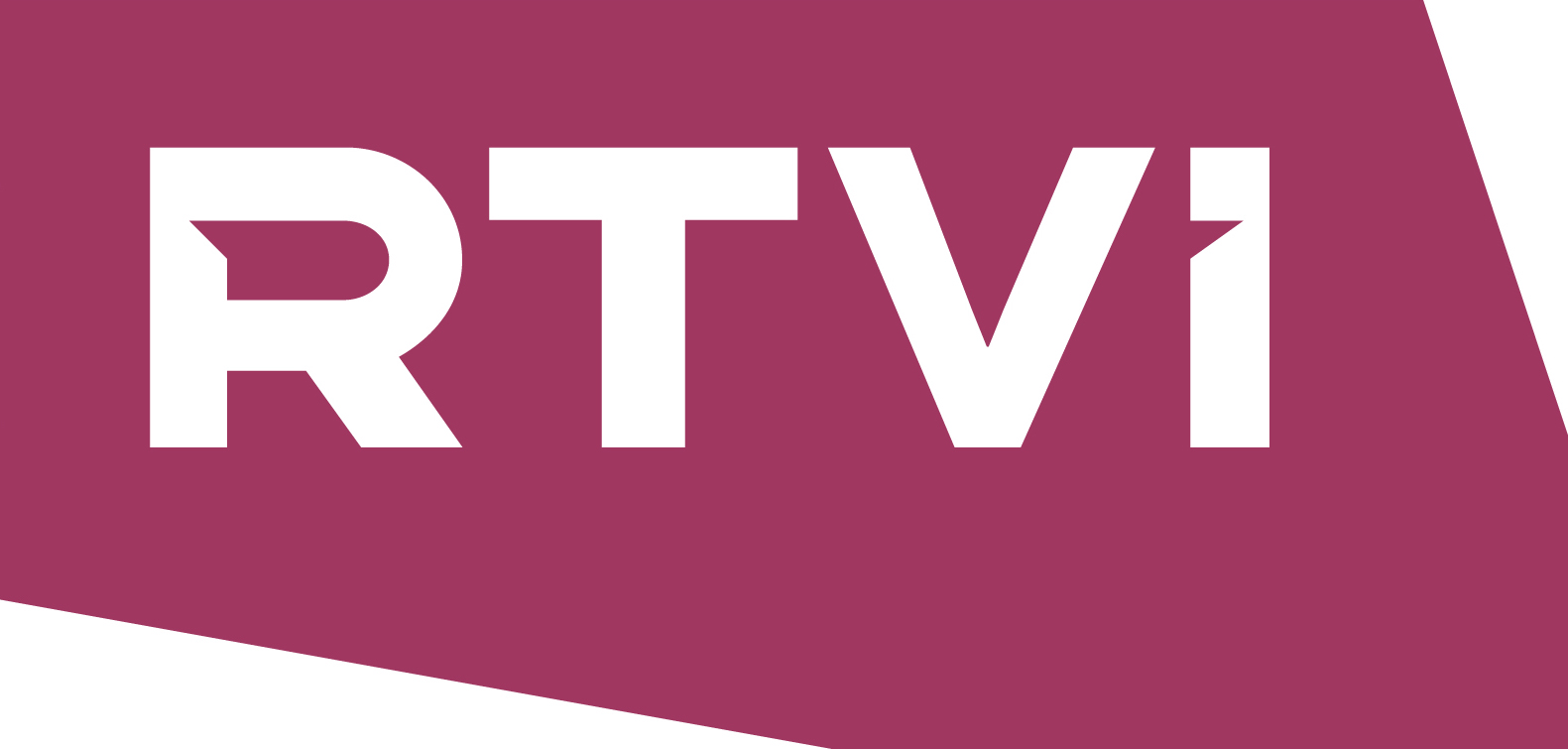
- Logo used in 2017
- Country: Canada
- Broadcast area: National
- Headquarters: Toronto, Ontario

Programming
- Picture format: 480i SDTV

Ownership
- Owner: Ethnic Channels Group (name licensed by RTVI)

History
- Launched: June 23, 2004

Links
- Website: RTVi

RTVi is a Canadian exempt Category B Russian language specialty channel owned by Ethnic Channels Group (ECG). It broadcasts programming from RTVi and local Canadian content.

RTVi is a general entertainment channel that caters to the Russian diaspora in North America & Israel. It features a programming lineup created specifically for Russian speaking audiences outside of Russia and includes movies, news, and sports, as well as coverage of local and international community events.

== Logos ==
2004-2017

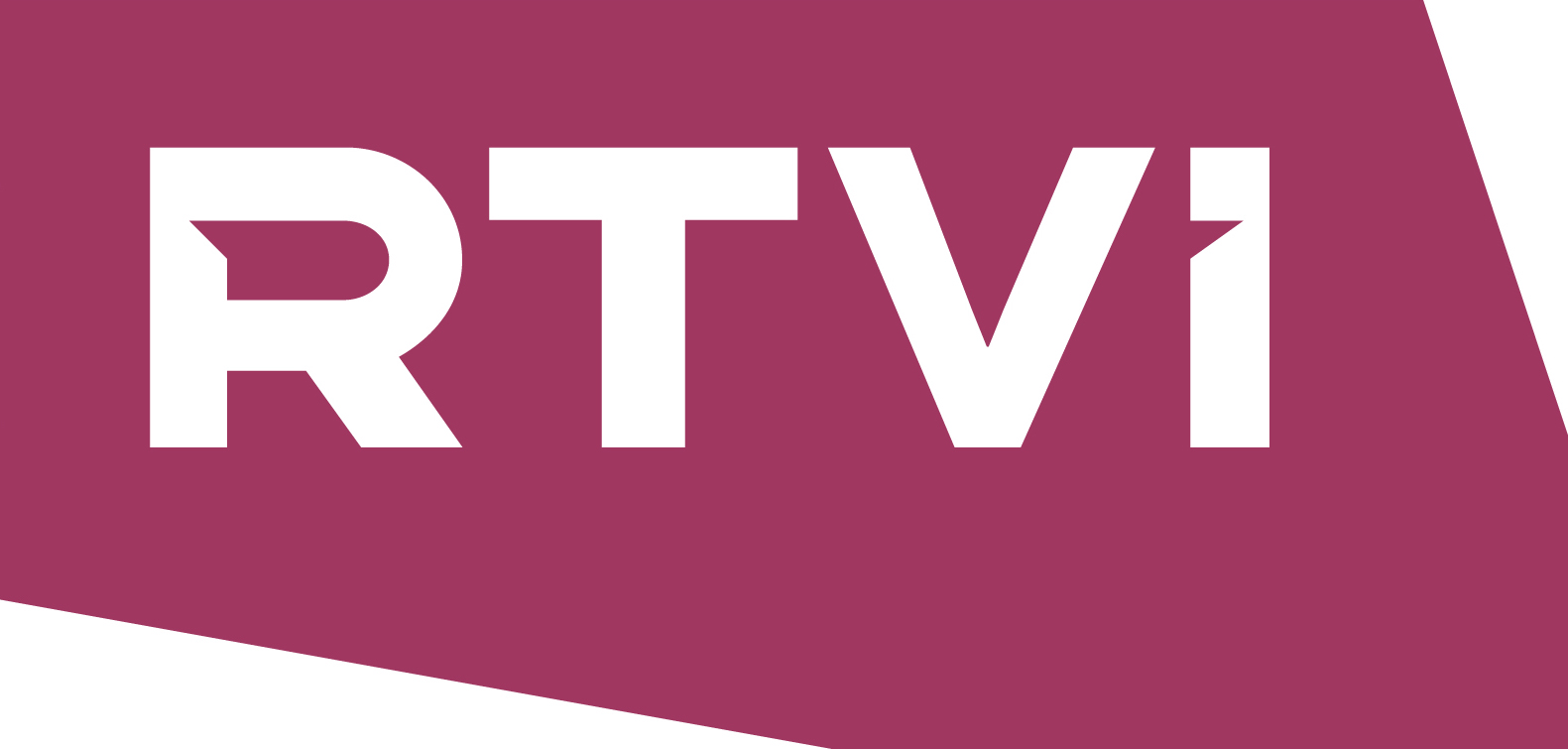
2017–present

== History ==
In September 2003, ECG was granted approval from the Canadian Radio-television and Telecommunications Commission (CRTC) to launch a specialty channel called Russian TV One, described as "an ethnic Category 21 specialty television service... targeting the Russian-speaking community."

The channel launched on June 23, 2004, along with 3 other channels from ECG, as RTVi, through a licensing agreement with the Russian broadcaster.

A sister-channel, branded RTVi+ was launched in the Fall of 2005, however, it was discontinued in 2009.

On November 4, 2014, the CRTC approved EGC's request to convert RTVi from a licensed Category B (formerly category 2) specialty service to an exempted category B third language service.
