= Israel+ (Canada) =

- Israel+ logo
- Country: Canada
- Broadcast area: National
- Headquarters: Toronto, Ontario

Programming
- Picture format: 480i (SDTV)

Ownership
- Owner: Ethnic Channels Group (name licensed by Israel+)

History
- Launched: December 2005
- Former names: The Israeli Network Canada

Links
- Website: Israel+ Canada

Israel+ is a Canadian exempt Category B Hebrew language specialty channel. It is wholly owned by Ethnic Channels Group, with its name used under license from the owners of the Israeli-based TV channel, Israel+.

== Programming ==
Israel+ broadcasts a wide variety of programming including news, current affairs, dramas, and sports primarily from Israel+. The Israeli-based Israel+ itself sources much of its programming from Channel One, Channel 2, Sport 5, and Hop TV.

== History ==
Logo used form 2005-2016

In November 2004, Ethnic Channels Group was granted approval from the Canadian Radio-television and Telecommunications Commission (CRTC) to launch a television channel called Israeli TV 1, described as "a national ethnic Category 2 specialty programming undertaking of general interest and devoted to the Hebrew-speaking community."

The channel launched in December 2005 as The Israeli Network initially exclusively on Rogers Cable.

On October 16, 2014, the CRTC approved Ethnic Channels Group's request to convert The Israeli Network from a licensed Category B specialty service to an exempted Cat. B third language service.

In late August 2024, the channel was renamed Israel+.
