= Big Magic International (Canada) =

Canadian Hindi-language TV channel

- Country: Canada
- Broadcast area: National
- Headquarters: Toronto, Ontario

Programming
- Picture format: 480i (SDTV)

Ownership
- Owner: Ethnic Channels Group

History
- Launched: November 2009
- Closed: 2016
- Former names: NDTV Imagine (2009–2011); Imagine Dil Se (2011–2012)

Links
- Website: Big Magic International

Big Magic International was a Canadian exempt Category B Hindi language specialty channel and it was owned by Ethnic Channels Group. It broadcast programming from Big Magic, Bloomberg UTV and local Canadian content. The channel had expanded internationally to markets like the US, Canada and Australia, which had an enormous South Asian diaspora.

Big Magic was a general entertainment service from India, programming includes comedies, dramas, music, movies, business news and reality series.

== History ==
Big Magic International was licensed by the CRTC on August 9, 2006 as Hindi TV. It originally launched as NDTV Imagine In November 2009 but was subsequently re-branded as 'Imagine Dil Se' in early 2011.

On April 12, 2012, Turner Broadcasting System announced that they would be shutting down Imagine TV in India due to the channel not performing to their expectations. The channel ceased operations on May 11, 2012.

On June 21, 2012, Imagine Dil Se Canada was re-branded as 'Big Magic International', following the signing of an exclusive deal with Reliance Broadcast Network.

On August 13, 2015, the CRTC approved Ethnic Channels Group's request to convert Big Magic International from a licensed Category B specialty service to an exempted Cat. B third language service.

== See also ==
- BIG Magic
