= Momo Kids =

Canadian Mandarin-language television channel

momo KIDS Asia
- Country: Canada
- Broadcast area: Canada
- Headquarters: Markham, Ontario

Programming
- Language(s): Mandarin
- Picture format: 480i (SDTV)

Ownership
- Owner: Ethnic Channels Group (branding licensed from Win TV Broadcasting)

History
- Launched: January 1, 2007; 18 years ago

Links
- Website: Momo Kids

Momo Kids is an Asian Category B-exempt Mandarin language specialty channel owned by the Ethnic Channels Group. It is a licensed version of the Taiwanese children's channel of the same name and broadcasts its original content.
