= Dream 2 (TV channel) =

- Dream 2 logo
- Country: Egypt
- Broadcast area: Egypt, Canada
- Headquarters: Cairo, Egypt

Programming
- Picture format: 576i (SDTV)

Ownership
- Sister channels: Dream 1 (TV channel)

History
- Launched: February 2011; 15 years ago
- Closed: 2015; 11 years ago

Links
- Website: Infobox person

Dream 2 (Arabic: دريم 2) was an Egyptian-Canadian exempt Category B Arabic language specialty channel and was owned by Ethnic Channels Group. It broadcast programming from Dream 2 as well as local Canadian content.

Dream 2 was a top rated general interest television channel from Egypt. It featured a wide variety of programming including news, current affairs, sports, movies and popular series including comedies & dramas. The channel ceased to exist by 2015 as the Dream TV network became only one channel for the first time since 2001.
