= VGN TV (Canada) =

Canadian Vietnamese-language television channel

- Country: Canada
- Broadcast area: National
- Headquarters: Toronto, Ontario

Programming
- Picture format: 480i (SDTV)

Ownership
- Owner: Ethnic Channels Group

History
- Launched: July 2004
- Former names: SBTN (2004–2020)

Links
- Website: VGN TV Canada

VGN TV is a Canadian exempt Category B Vietnamese language specialty channel and is owned by Ethnic Channels Group. It broadcasts programming from Viet Global Network TV (VGN TV) and local Canadian content. Programming includes movies, music, drama, variety shows and more.

== History ==
On September 4, 2003, Ethnic Channels Group was granted approval from the Canadian Radio-television and Telecommunications Commission (CRTC) to launch a television channel called Vietnamese TV, described as "The licensee shall provide a national ethnic Category 2 specialty television service providing a programming service primarily in the Vietnamese language. Not less than 90% of all programming broadcast during the broadcast week shall be in the Vietnamese language".

The channel launched in July 2004 as SBTN on Rogers Cable.

On August 30, 2013, the CRTC approved Ethnic Channels Group's request to convert SBTN from a licensed Category B specialty service to an exempted Cat. B third language service.

In March 2020, the channel was re-branded as VGN TV due to a change in the program supplier.

SBTN logo
