= Melody Aflam =

Canadian pay television channel

- Melody Aflam logo (August 2006)
- Country: Egypt
- Broadcast area: Middle East, Canada
- Headquarters: Cairo, Egypt

Programming
- Picture format: 576i (SDTV)

Ownership
- Owner: Melody Interactive (Egyptian version); Ethnic Channels Group (Canadian version) (name licensed by Melody Interactive)

History
- Launched: January 2006; 20 years ago
- Closed: 28 April 2013; 13 years ago

Melody Aflam (Arabic: ميلودي أفلام) was an Egyptian-Canadian pay television channel that was owned by Ethnic Channels Group. It broadcast programming from Melody Aflam as well as local Canadian content.

== Background ==
Melody Aflam was a film channel from Egypt. It featured a variety of films from the Arab world including classics and current hits, spanning decades from the 1950s through to the present day. The movies aired covered genres from action to comedy to historical films.

The Melody TV network was owned by Gamal Marwan, son of Ashraf Marwan. The network ceased to exist by 2013 due to financial difficulties.

== Bibliography ==
- Atef, Yumna (2013), Administrative organization of satellite channels (in Arabic), Al Manhal, ISBN 9796500129815
