= Morni Fort =

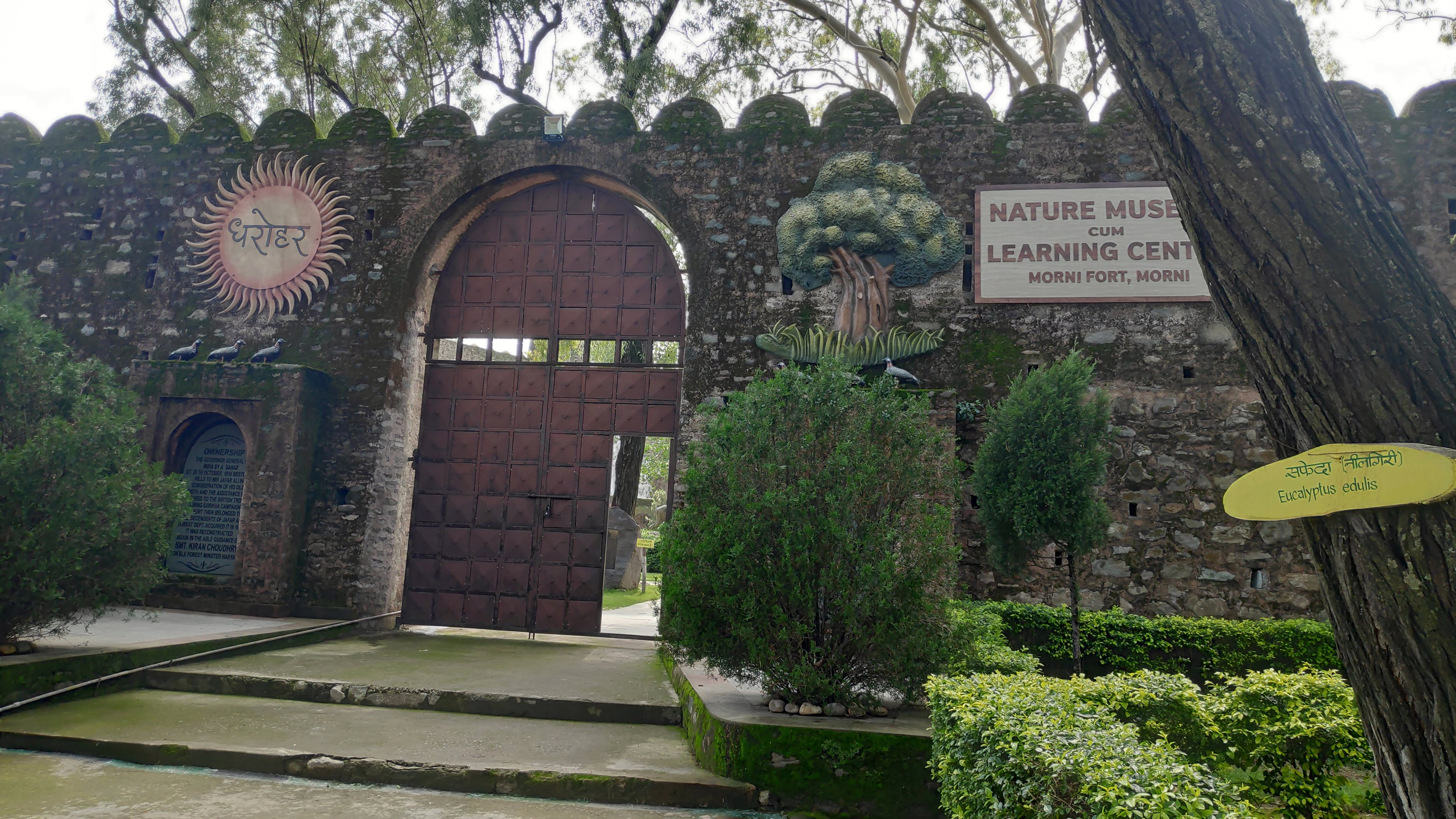
- Entry Gate view of Morni Fort (Panchkula district, Haryana, India)
- Location: Morni, Panchkula district, Haryana, India
- Accreditation: Haryana Government
- Key holdings: Flora and fauna, bird gallery & projections about environment challenges
- Architect: By Harvansh Dua
- Parking: Morni Fort parking

Morni Fort is a nature museum and learning centre situated in Morni Village, about 32 km from Panchkula City in the Panchkula district in Indian state of Haryana. The 200 years old Morni fort in Morni hills was transformed into a museum at a cost of over INR 1 crore.

== Inauguration ==
It was inaugurated on 13 November 2017 by Rao Narbir Singh who is Forests and Public Works (Building and Roads) Minister, Haryana. The Haryana Government gave the contract to a company that runs a NGO-Prakriti.

== History ==
The Morni fort has four towers. The inside of the fort was improved in 1814 during the time when the King of Sirmur came to the fort to hide after he was overthrown from Nahan by Gurkhas. The fort remains cool during summers because of its well ventilated domes. The fort also has a well/reservoir.

== About the museum ==
The layout and design of the museum has been created by Harvansh Dua. It has dozens of figures of wildlife, wall murals, domes, caves and 3D artwork which took around 8 months to complete. The fort was converted to a museum by the Forests Department of Haryana in FY 2017-18. It has photographs of the fort, photographs related to environment protection and those of animals and birds which are on a verge of extinction.

== Virtual tour ==
"There were three rooms and four attaris (enclosures of 15x12 sq feet) to be done up. We dedicated one room to flora and fauna and the attari behind it showcases animals in their natural habitat. A washroom was converted into a tiger's den with a bird gallery alongside.The second room displays the projects undertaken by Haryana forest department to conserve forest and wildlife such as agro forestry and vulture breeding The third room gives a peep into the environment challenges such as population explosion, forest fires, degradation, acid rain and degeneration of natural habitat," said by Dua.

== Gallery ==
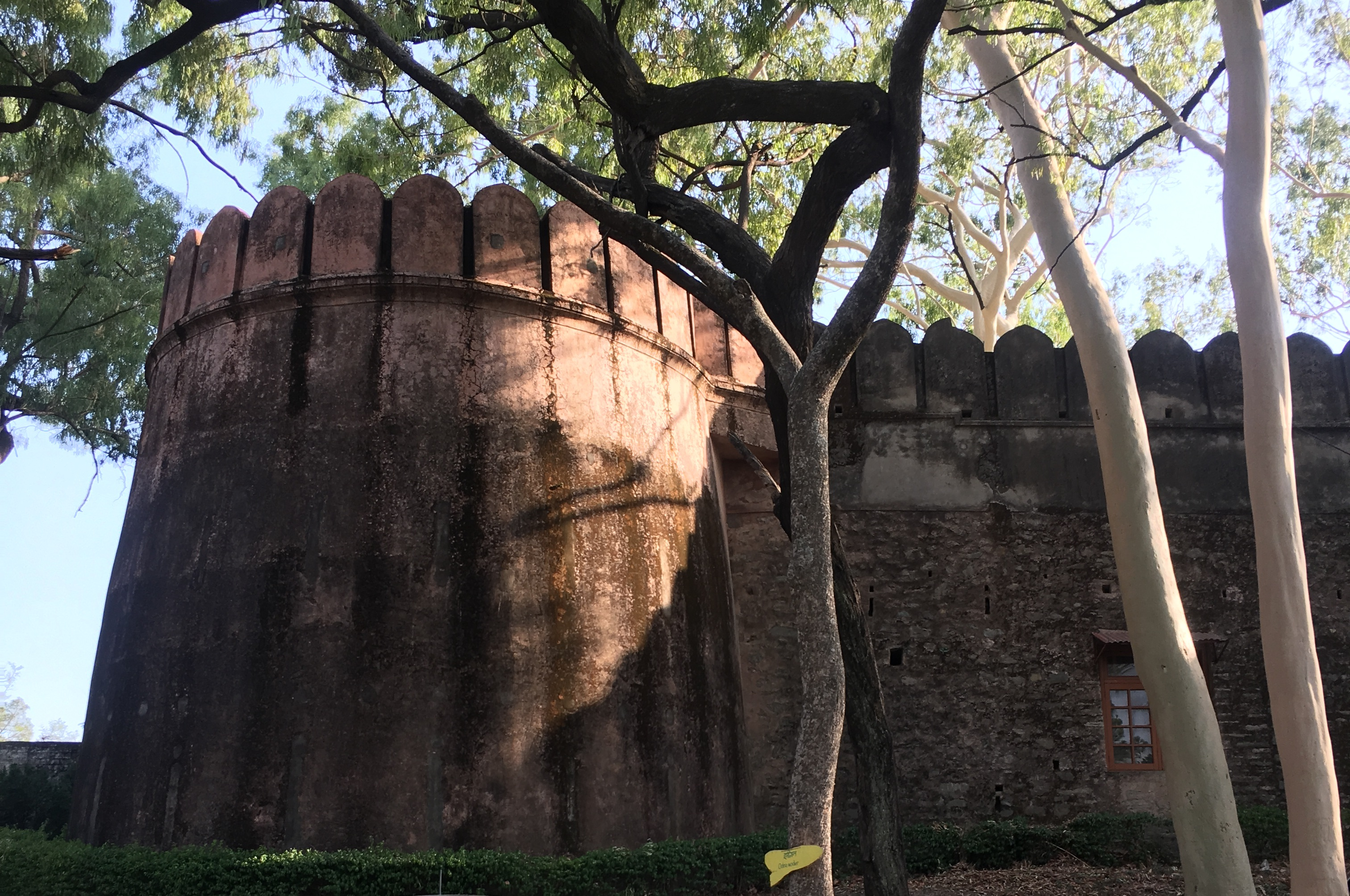
Exterior view

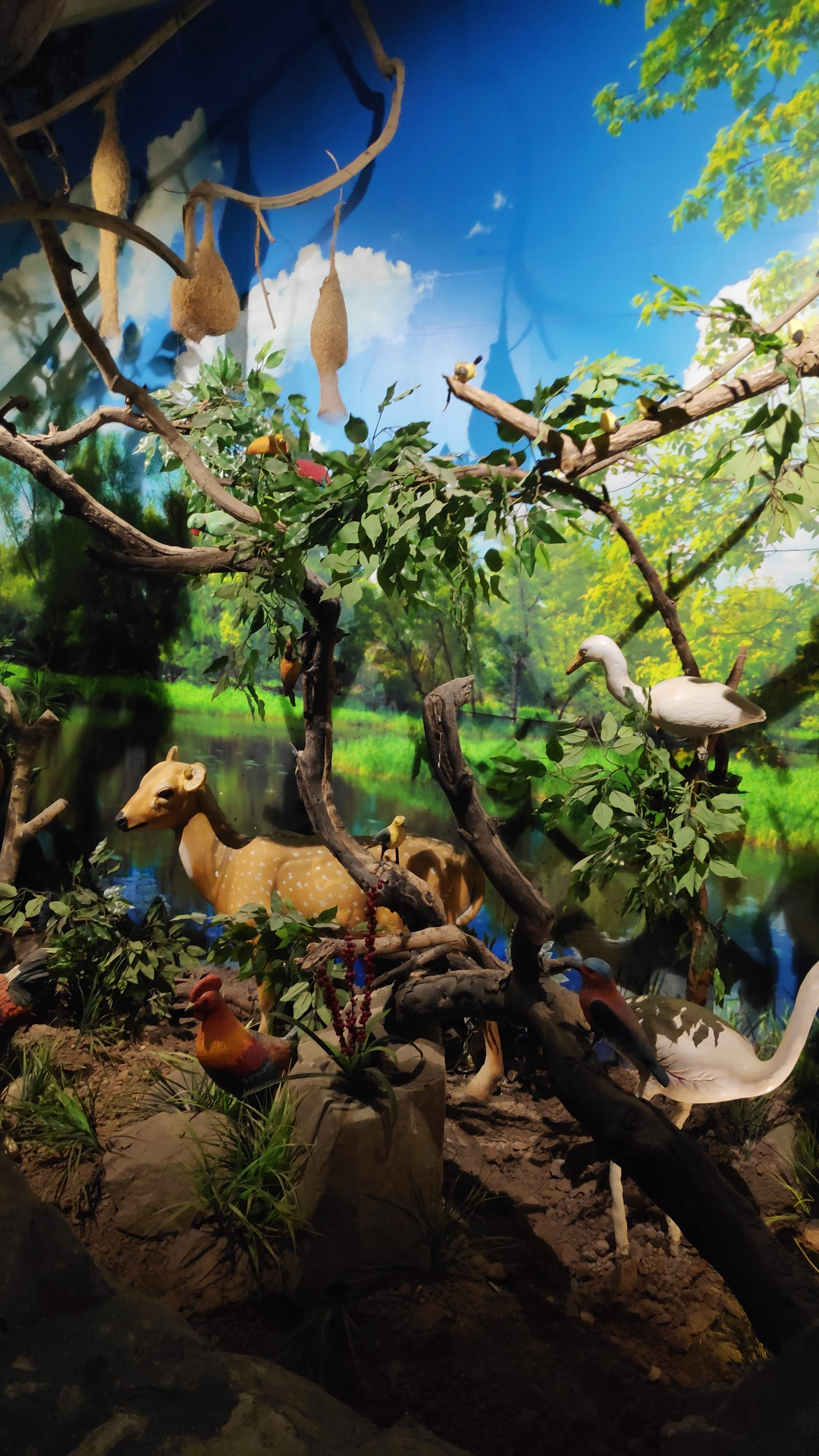
Nature conservation room Morni

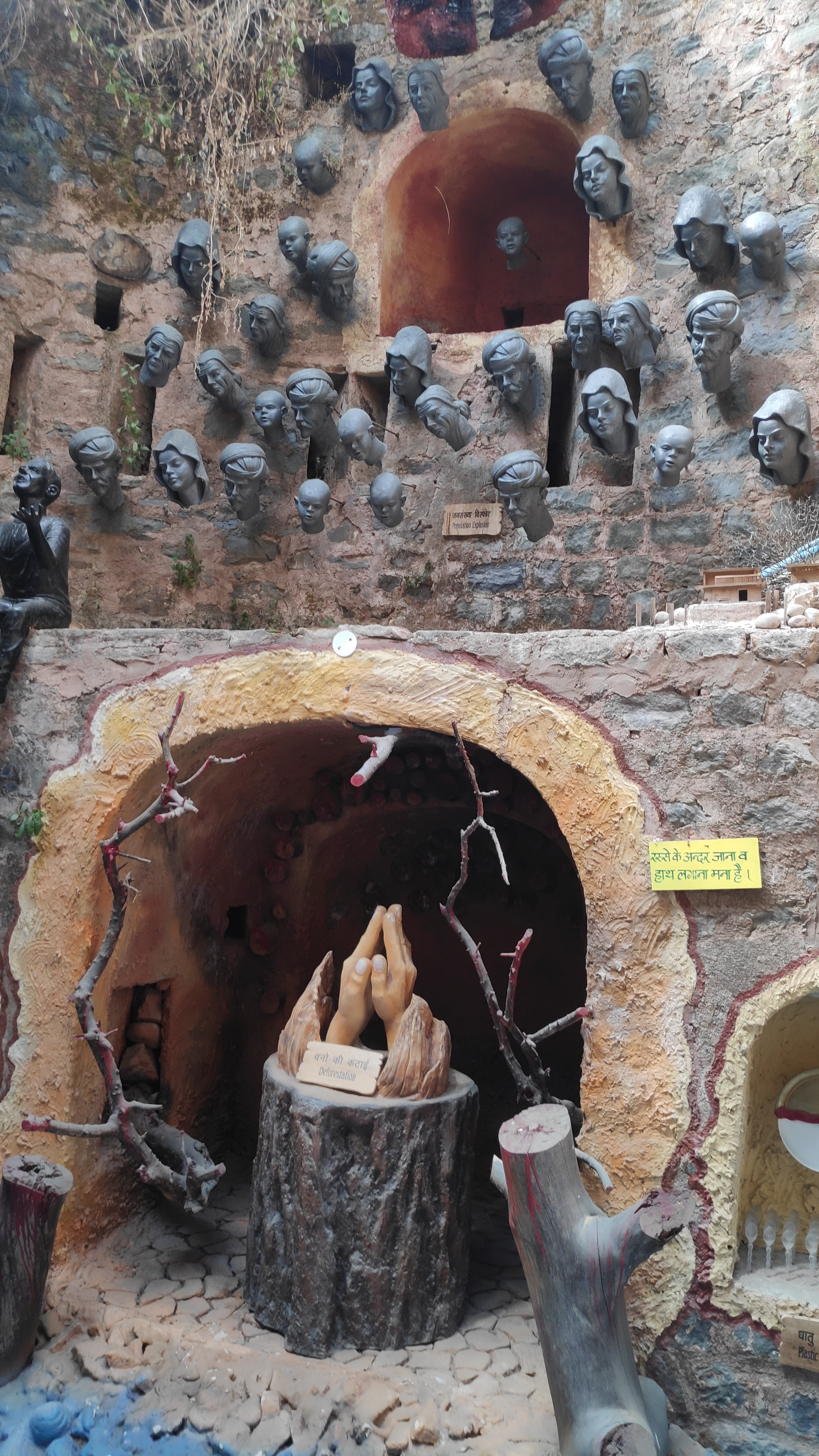
Room view of Morni fort.

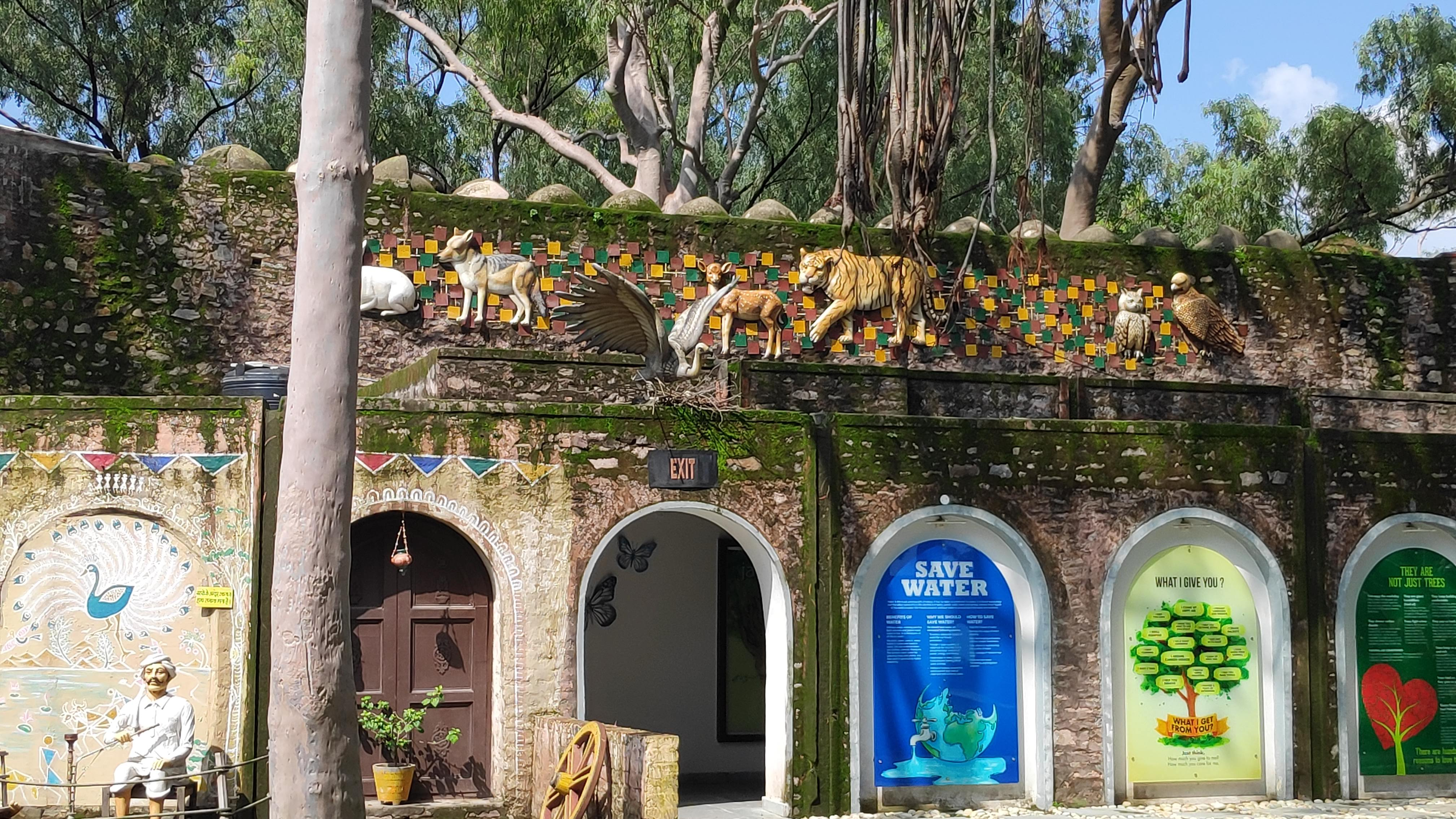
Different rooms view of Morni fort

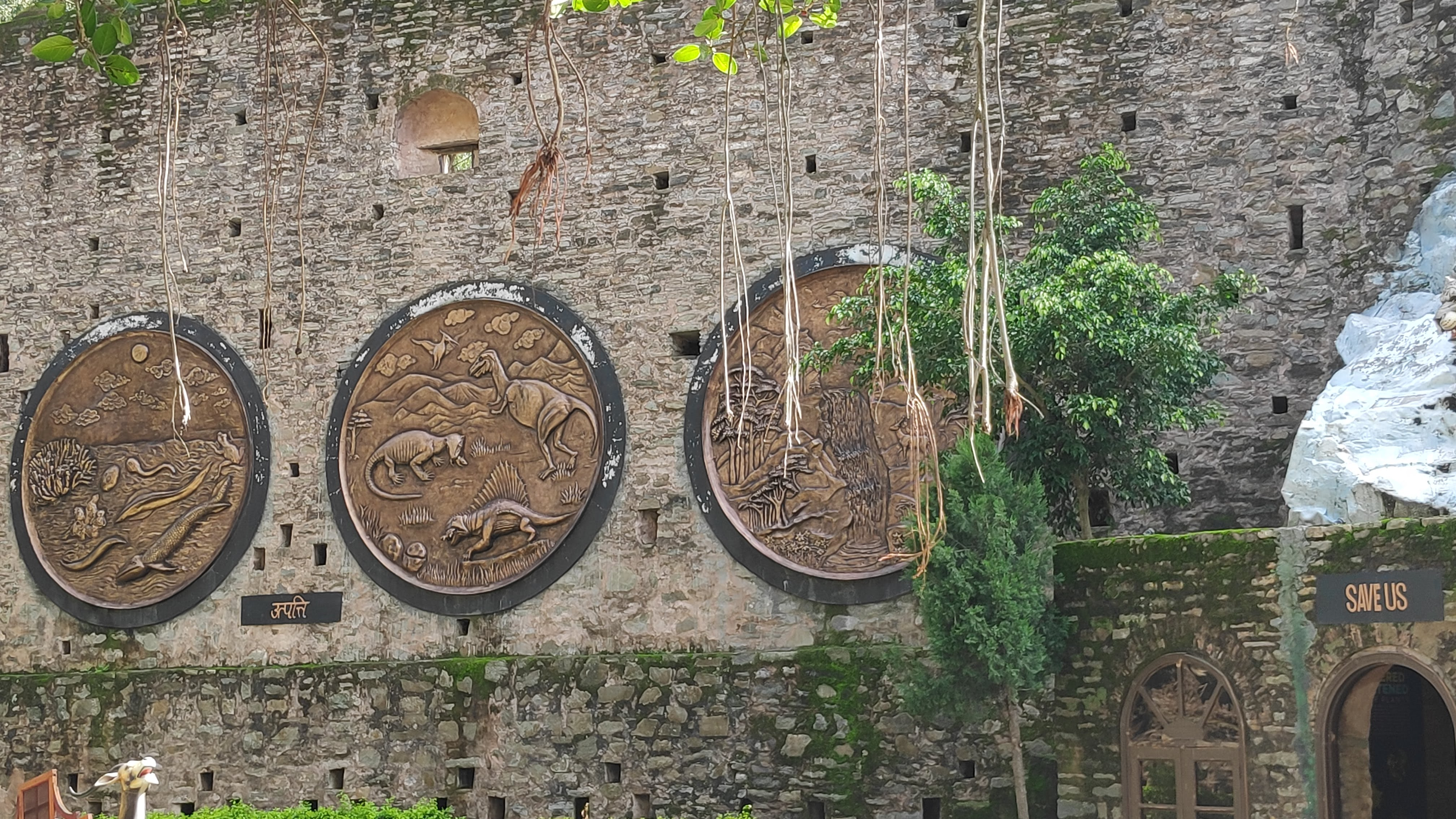
Wall crafting on Morni fort.

== Futuristic appeal ==
Museum has been designed in such a way that it will attract people of all age groups but the focus is mainly on educating youth about the history of unknown places in this area.

== Highlights ==
- The newly constructed Nature Museum cum learning Centre has been developed as a centre for carrying out study on nature.
- The Morni Fort with its stonework was built around in the 17th century on the top of the Morni hill at a height of approximately 1200 meters
- There is a Shiva temple outside the Eastern Gate
- The fort is visible from 4–5 km from Morni Town due to being at hilltop, while going from Panchkula road to Badiyal road

== Tour duration ==
Total duration of tour inside museum took around 1h 30 min, Mon - Sun (09:00 AM to 05:00 PM)
