= Morni =

Village in India

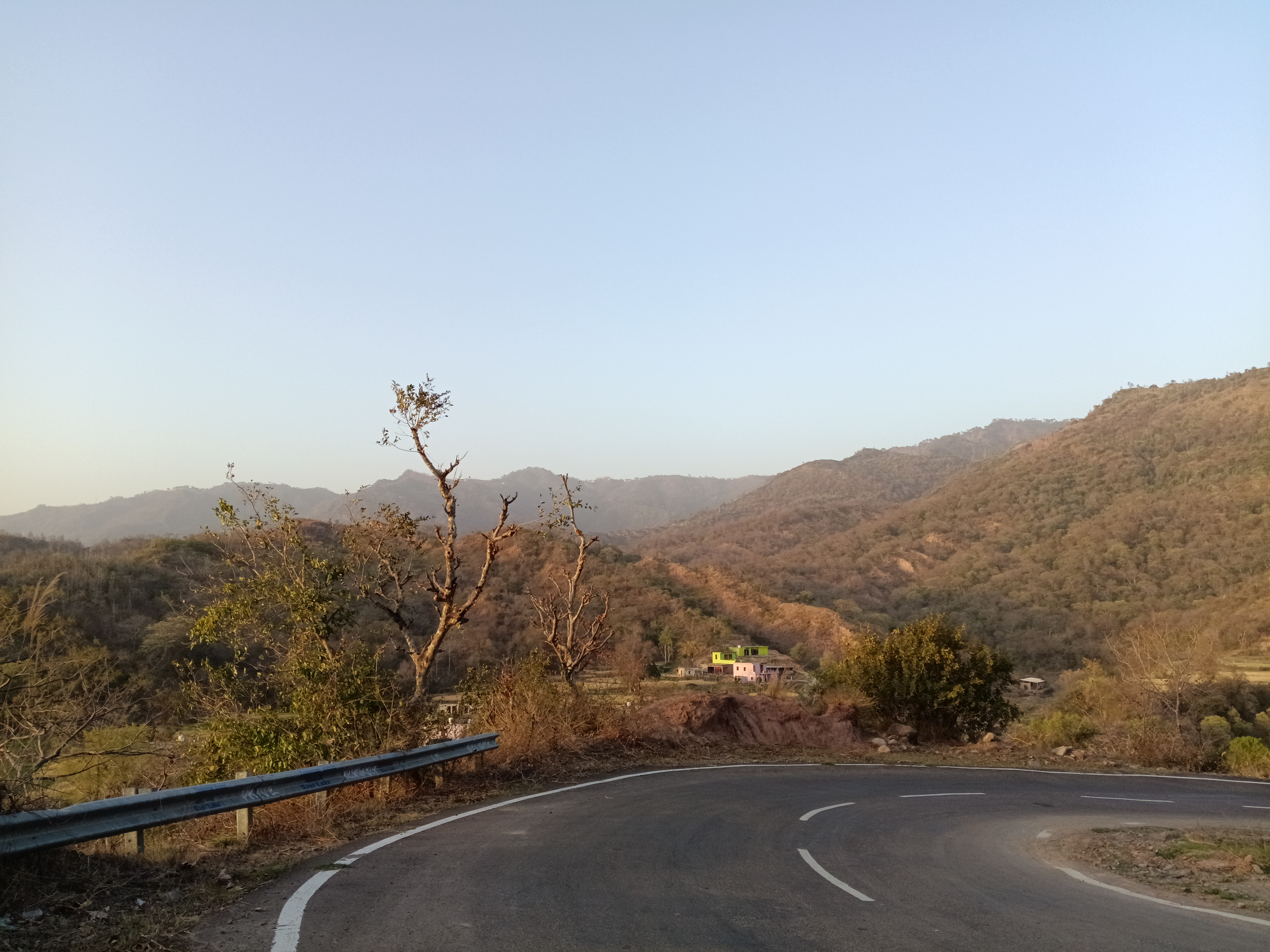

Highest point
- Elevation: 1,220 m (4,000 ft)
- Listing: List of Indian states and territories by highest point
- Coordinates: 30°42′N 77°05′E

Geography
- Location within Haryana Location within India
- Location: Panchkula district, Haryana
- Parent range: Shivalik Hills of Himalayas

Climbing
- Easiest route: Hike / scramble

Morni is a village and tourist attraction in the Morni Hills in the Panchkula district of the northern Indian state of Haryana. The village lies at a height of 1,267 metres (4,157 ft) above sea level and is located around 45 kilometres (28 mi) from Chandigarh and 35 kilometres (22 mi) from Panchkula city. It is known for its view of the distant Himalayas, as well as its flora and lakes. The name "Morni" is believed to derive from a queen who once ruled the area two thousand years ago. She was said to be a just and noble ruler. Morni was also a jagir of Raja Mir Syed Muhammad Baquar Ali Khan.In the Morni Hills ilaka, landholding patterns reflected a caste-based agrarian structure. Kanets held the majority share, occupying approximately 60% of cultivated land, followed by Gaur Brahmins with around 24%, and Gujars with about 16%. Holdings were predominantly small, typically ranging between four to five acres, and were chiefly cultivated by the proprietors themselves, indicating a system of direct subsistence agriculture with limited reliance on tenant labor.

== Geography ==
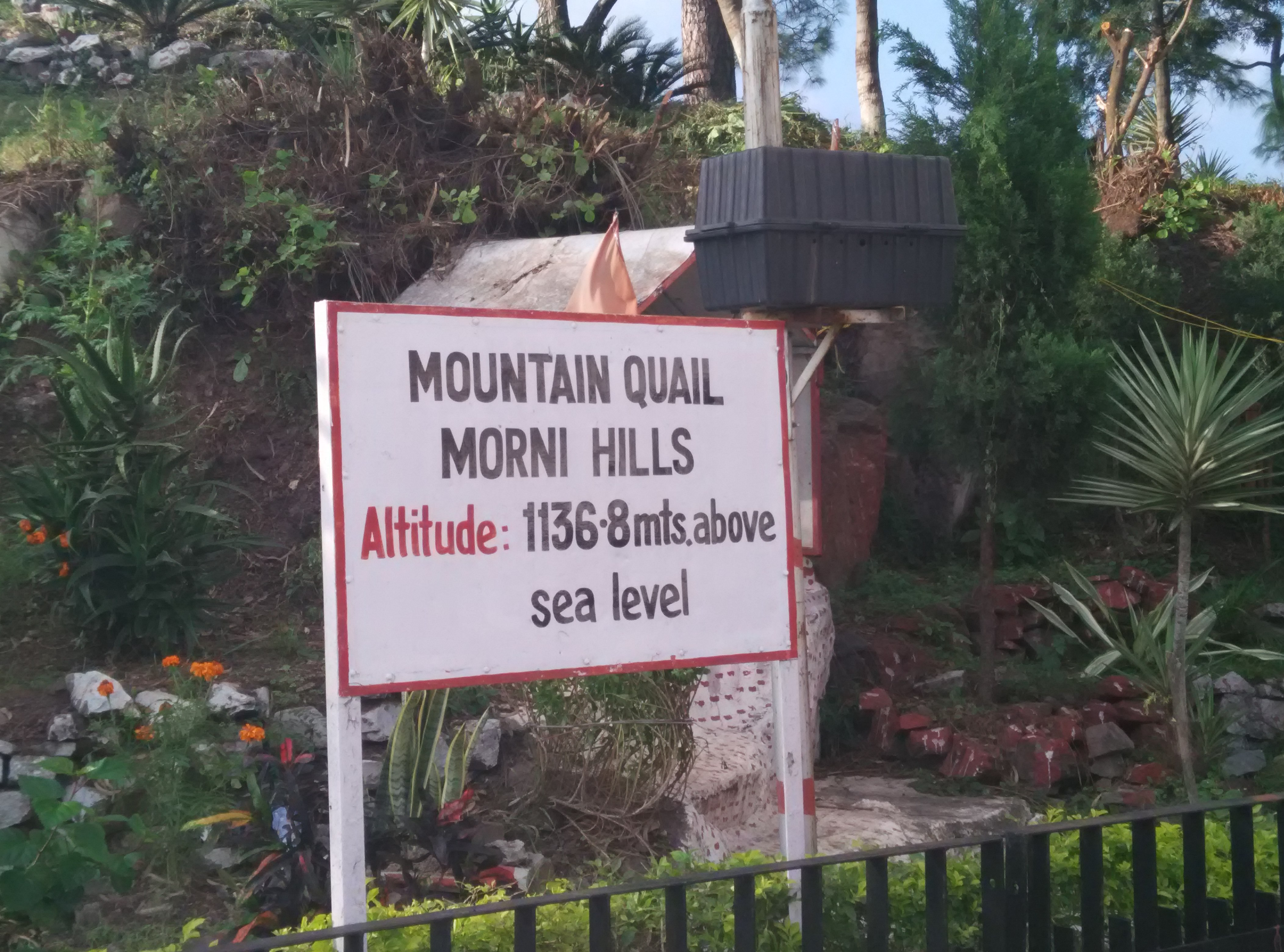
Sign board showing the altitude of Morni Hills

The Morni Hills are offshoots of the Shivalik range of the Himalayas, which run in two parallel ranges. The village of Morni lies on the mountainside, at 1,220 metres (4,000 ft) above mean sea level. Among the spurs of the hills lie two lakes, the larger of these being about 550 metres (1,800 ft) long and 460 metres (1,510 ft) broad, and the smaller around 365 metres (1,198 ft) either way.

== Tourism ==
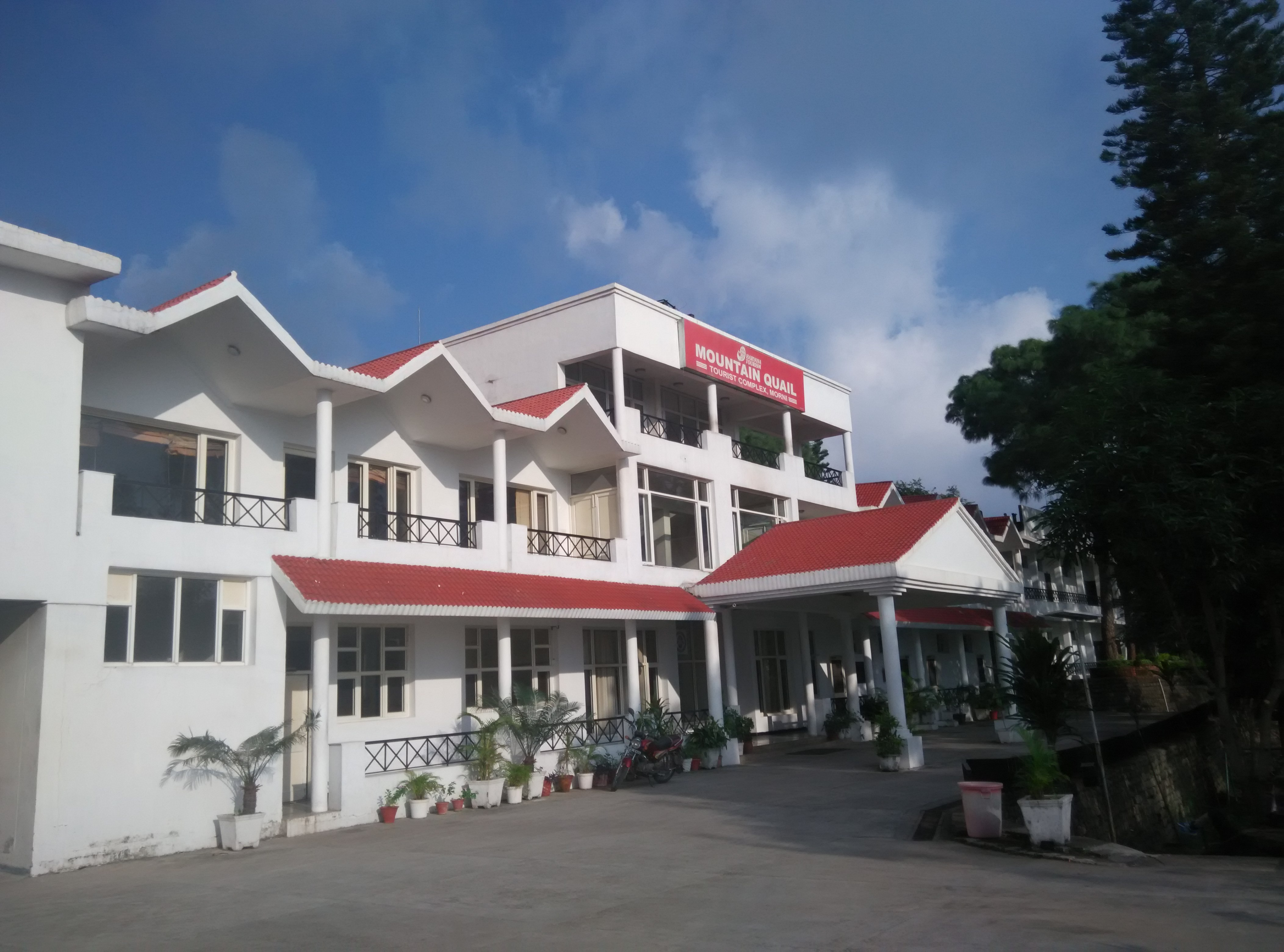
Haryana Tourism's Hotel Mountain Quail

The Haryana Government has constructed the Mountain Quail Resort for tourists. There are also many lodges, homestays, and farmstays for every tourist budget along with a motorable road to connect the Morni Hills with the Haryana State Highway near Panchkula. Three further roads connect Morni to Chandigarh and other nearby towns.

=== Forts ===
==== Morni Fort Museum ====
There is a two thousand year old fort in the Morni area, which was built by Queen Morni. Local folk songs mention how noble and just was queen Morni. The hills are covered by pine trees, and are popular trekking locations. The fort also has a museum built in fy 2017-18.

Forests Department of Haryana has converted the fort into a museum and nature study centre which houses old photographs of the fort, endangered birds and animals, awareness of dangers of plastic, etc.

==== Garhi Kotaha Fort ====
Garhi Kotaha is a fort on NH1 which lies 27 km south of the Morni Fort and 3 km east of Raipur Rani tehsil headquarter. It now lie in ruins since it was partially demolished by the British Raj after the Indian Rebellion of 1857. Mir Muslims of Kotaha ruled from Garhi Kotaha Fort with smaller forts at Morni and Massompur.

==== Masoompur Fort ====
Masoompur Fort is a smaller outpost fort with thick stone-brick masonry walls on a mud hillock. It is northeast of Massompur village which is 5 km from the main Garhi Kotaha Fort via road passing through Rehana village. It was built to control the access route to Samlotha temple, which lies northeast of the fort, to collect the hefty jizya (religious ransom tax) from the Hindu's pilgrimage.

=== Morni Hill Waterfall ===
Waterfall, access via a track in the forest, is active in the rainy season.

=== Morni Pheasant Breeding Center ===
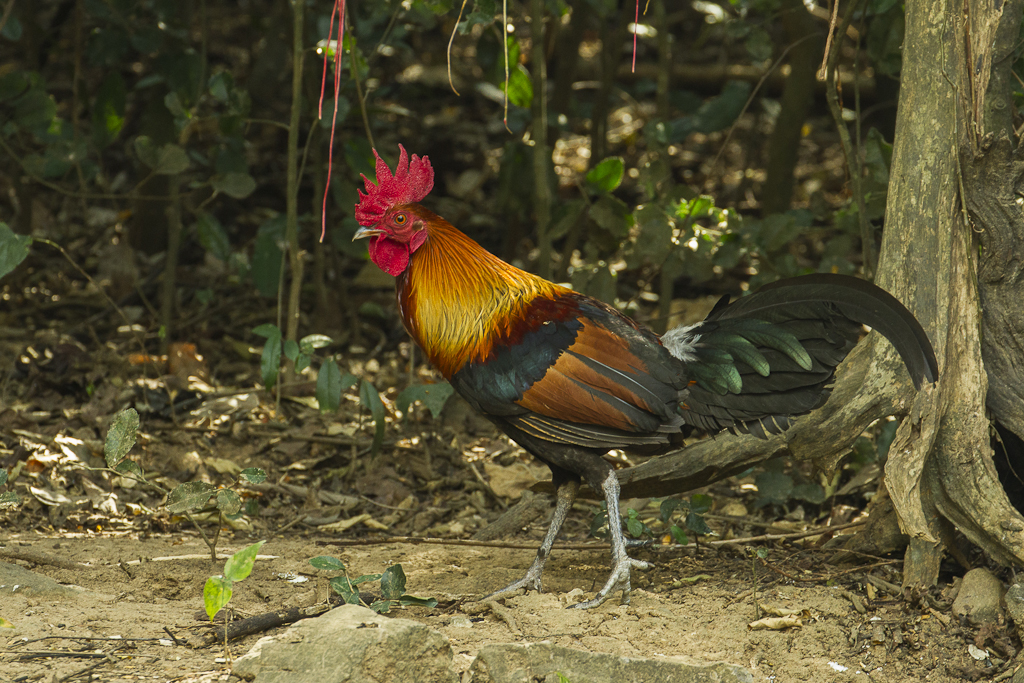
Red junglefowl.

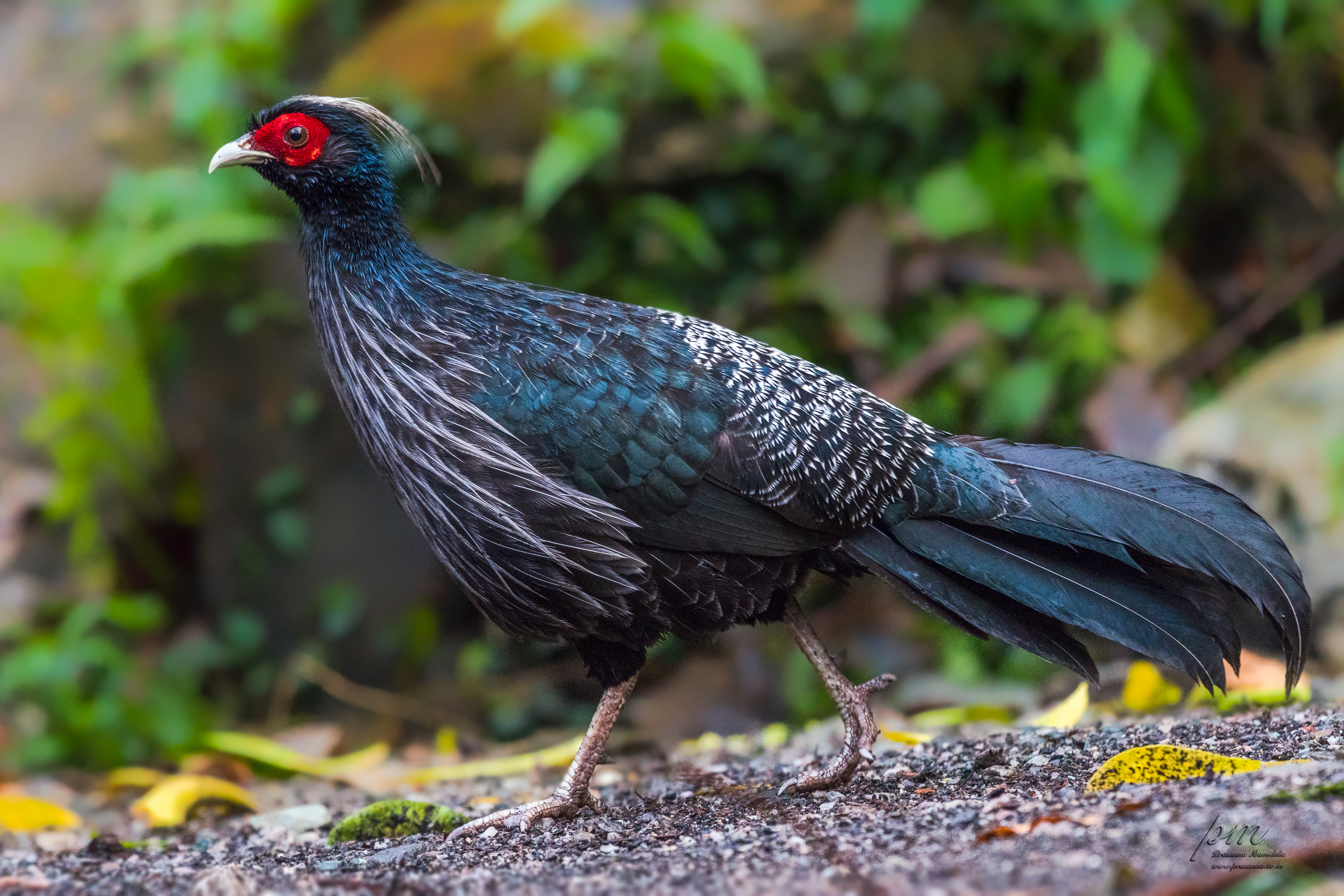
Kalij pheasant, male.

Morni Pheasant Breeding Center focuses on the breeding of red junglefowls and kalij pheasants, and regularly releases birds raised in captivity into the wild every year. Red junglefowl had become extinct from most of its range and there are concerns of loss of its genetic purity due to breeding with other related species of fowls. Consequently, in 1991-92 a pheasant breeding center at Morni Hills was established with 6 aviaries and a walk-in a aviary to preserve the wild breed.

=== Morni Hill Archaeological Temple Site ===
Thakur Dwar temple, dedicated to lord Krishna, at the banks of Tikkar Taal is built on the site of 10th Century temple. Excavations in 1970 found Hindu sculptures dating back to Pratihara era (7th to 11th century CE), some of which are housed at Government Museum and Art Gallery, Chandigarh and some remain in-situ at the Thakur Dwara temple at Morni Hills.

Bhuri Singh Deota temple, dedicated to the folk deity Buri Singh, is the cliff-temple at Pejarli village at a height of 1870 metres with unbroken scenic view of Ghaggar river (Sarasvati).

=== Herbal forest ===
In 2018, Haryana government starting establishing a 50,000 hectare herbal forest with the help of community self-help groups and with the assistance of Baba Ramdev's Patanjali Yogpeeth.

== See also ==
- Jatayu Conservation Breeding Centre, Pinjore
- Adi Badri, Haryana
- Geography of Haryana
- List of National Parks & Wildlife Sanctuaries of Haryana, India
- List of mountains in India
- List of mountains by elevation
- World Herbal Forest
