= World Herbal Forest =

Herbal garden in Haryana, India

World Herbal
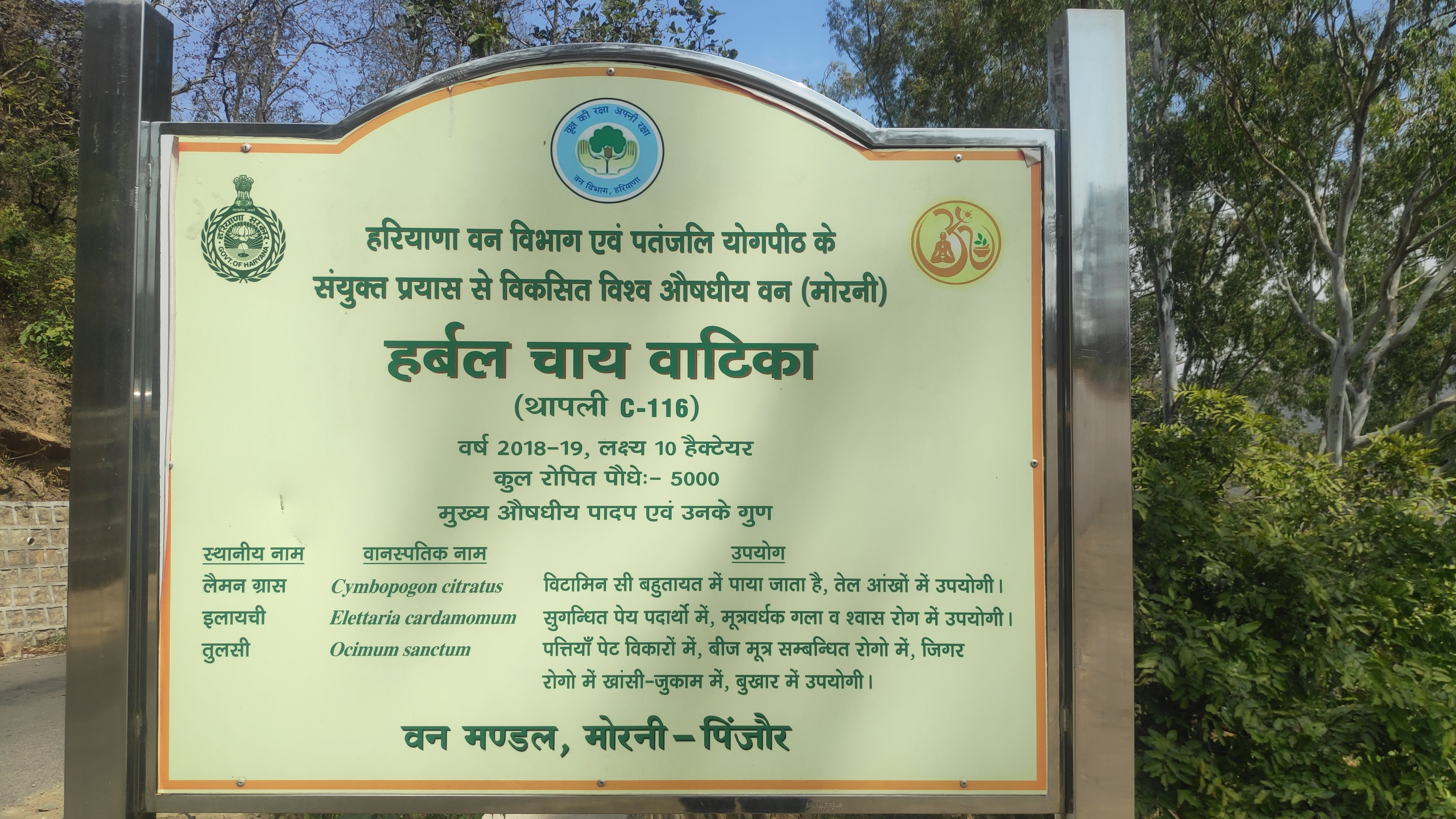
- Interactive map of World Herbal
- Location: Morni, Panchkula
- Nearest city: Chandigarh
- Coordinates: 30°43′48.434″S 77°0′28.923″E
- Established: 25 March 2017
- Governing body: Patanjali Yogpeeth

World Herbal Forest is an initiative of Government of Haryana.

== About ==
World Herbal Forest is an initiative of Government of Haryana to develop a forest of medicinal plants in Morni hills, Panchkula district, Haryana. it is a joint task force of the Haryana Forest Department, Patanjali Yogpeeth, Haridwar, and local people of Morni. In all, about 1,000 medicinal plants of different kinds would be identified and planted here. Haryana Chief Minister Manohar Lal Khattar today (20 December) inaugurated the World Herbal Forest Project at Morni Hill, 45 kilometres from Chandigarh. The project has been developed as a collaboration between Patanjali and the state government.

== First phase of the World Herbal ==
- Work started 25 March 2017, on the first phase of the World Herbal Forest
- About 25 different varieties of plants found in the country will be housed in this forest. 50,000 plants each of 20 medicinal varieties are being sown in the first phase.

== Team ==
Acharya Balkrishna from Patanjali, aided by a 40-member team of specialists, has so far identified 465 different types of plants.

== Main plants ==
Ginger, turmeric and ‘harad’ are grown in large quantities in the area.

== Future view ==
- This project will be huge boost to the Ayurvedic industry across the country.
- The project is expected to turn Haryana into a global tourist destination. The project will also help build a herbal based industrial zone in the surrounding areas and play an instrumental role in mass employment generation.
- Already helped it emerge as a model for environmental conservation and climate control that others can follow.
- Local farmers from morni would be engaged in farming activities and the area would be developed with nurseries of medicinal plants to make it a center of attraction to the entire world.
- Balkrishna said the development of the world herbal forest would generate employment opportunities for the local people.
- Haryana Chief Minister Manohar Lal Khattar said, "I am happy that now we have so many types of medicinal plants growing in our state. Here, we have at present 53 types of plants which can be used by the locals for treating different kinds of diseases. This forest will also help the people to gain economic benefits."

== Gallery ==
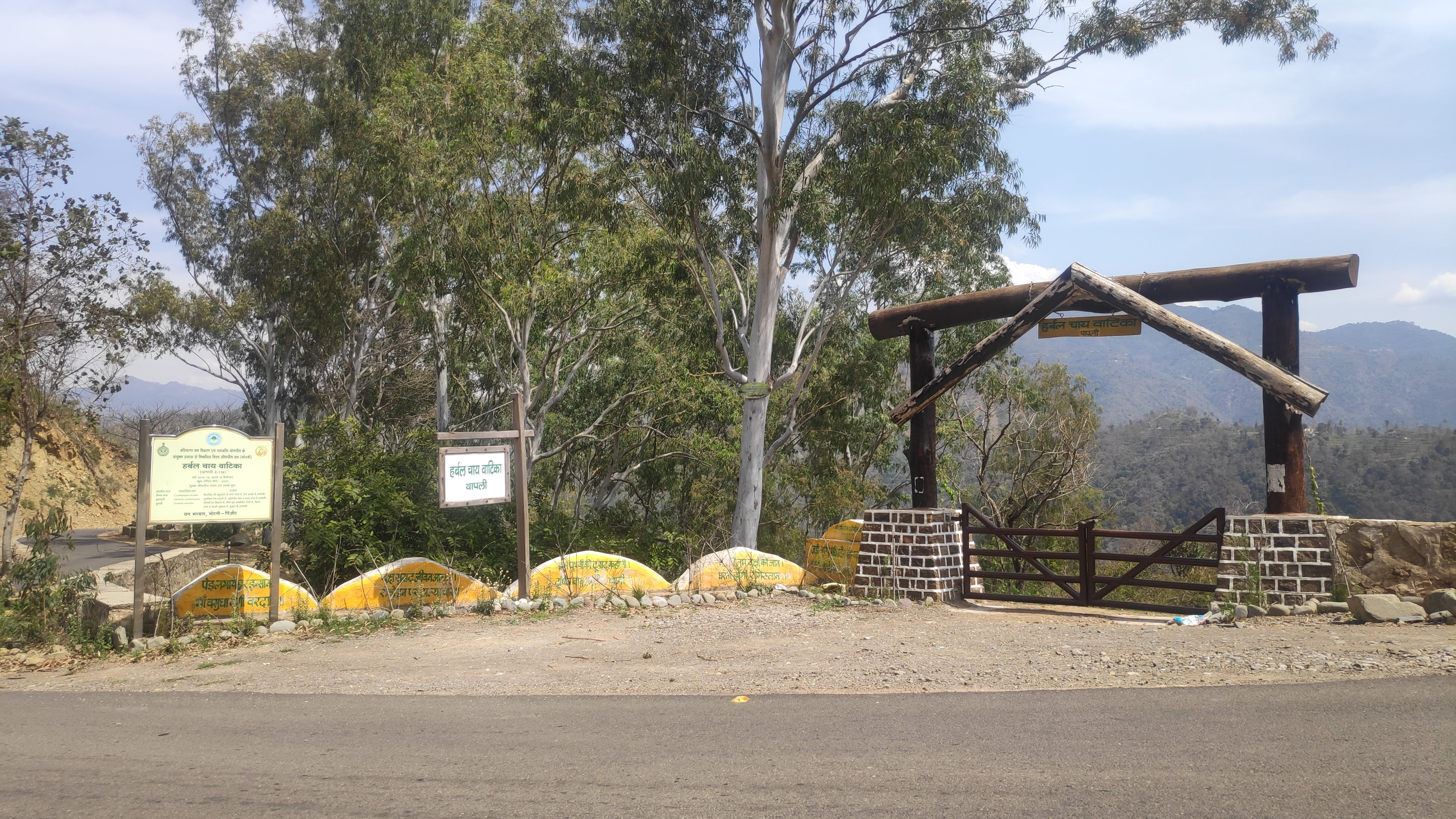

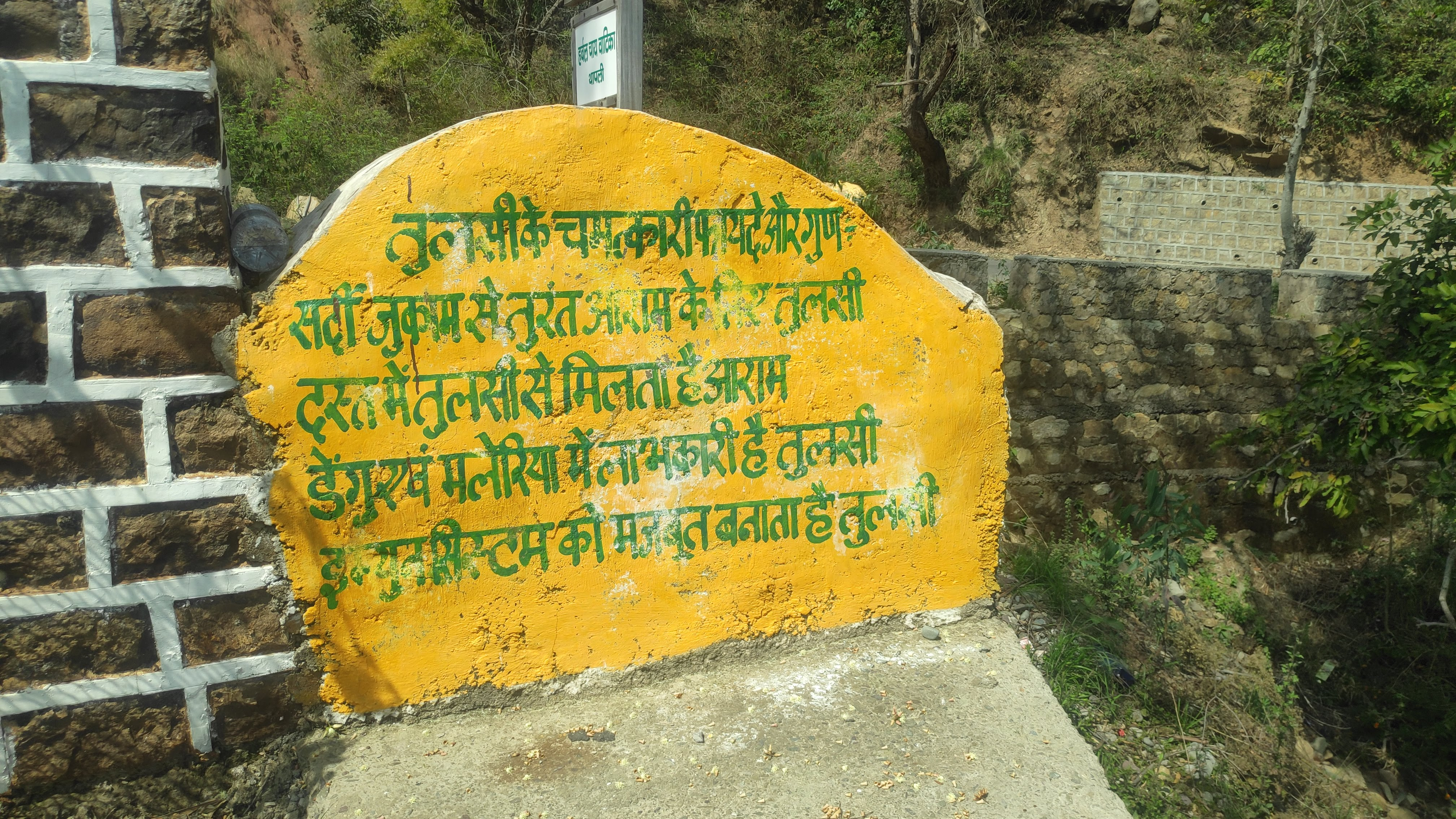

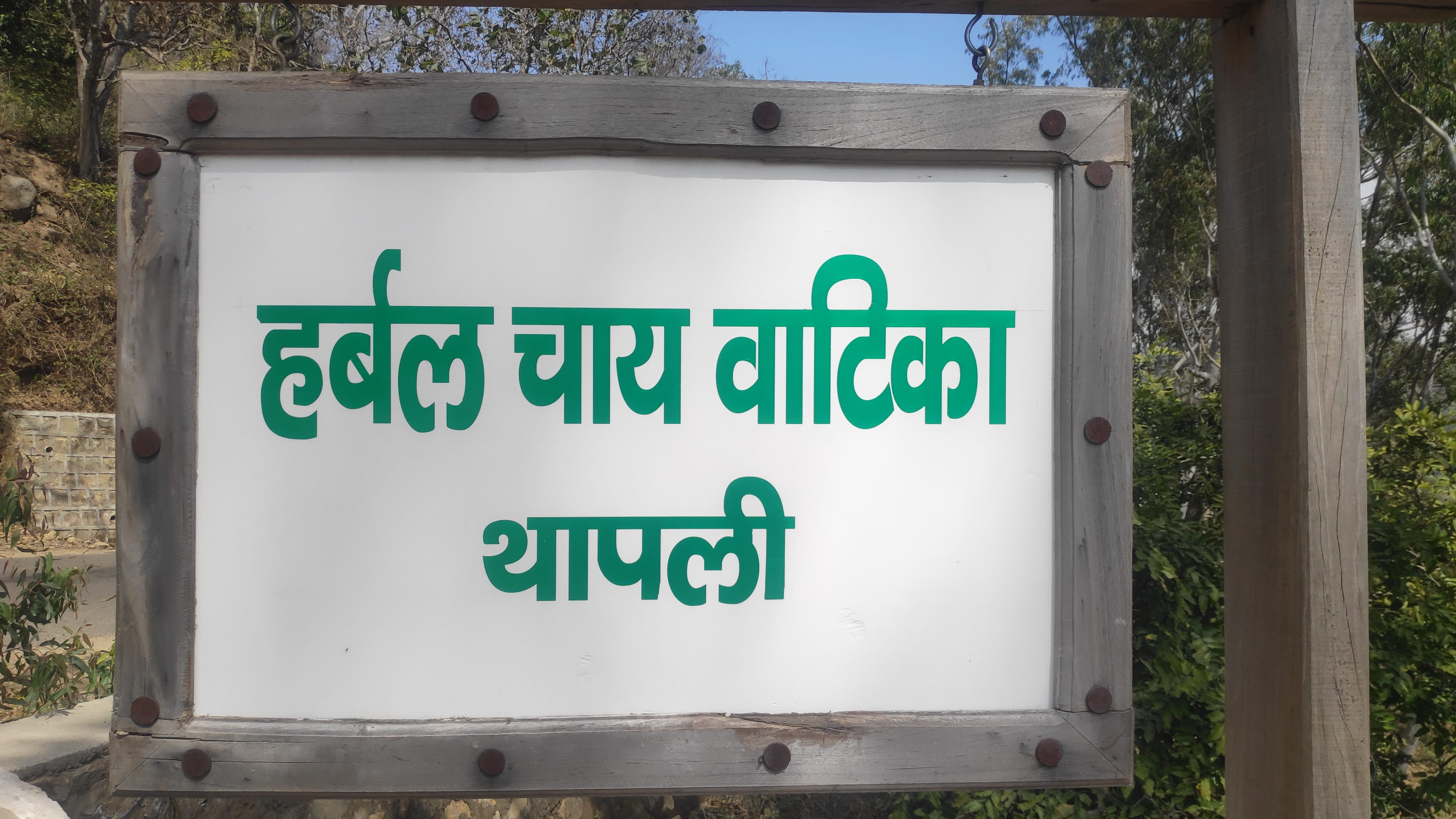

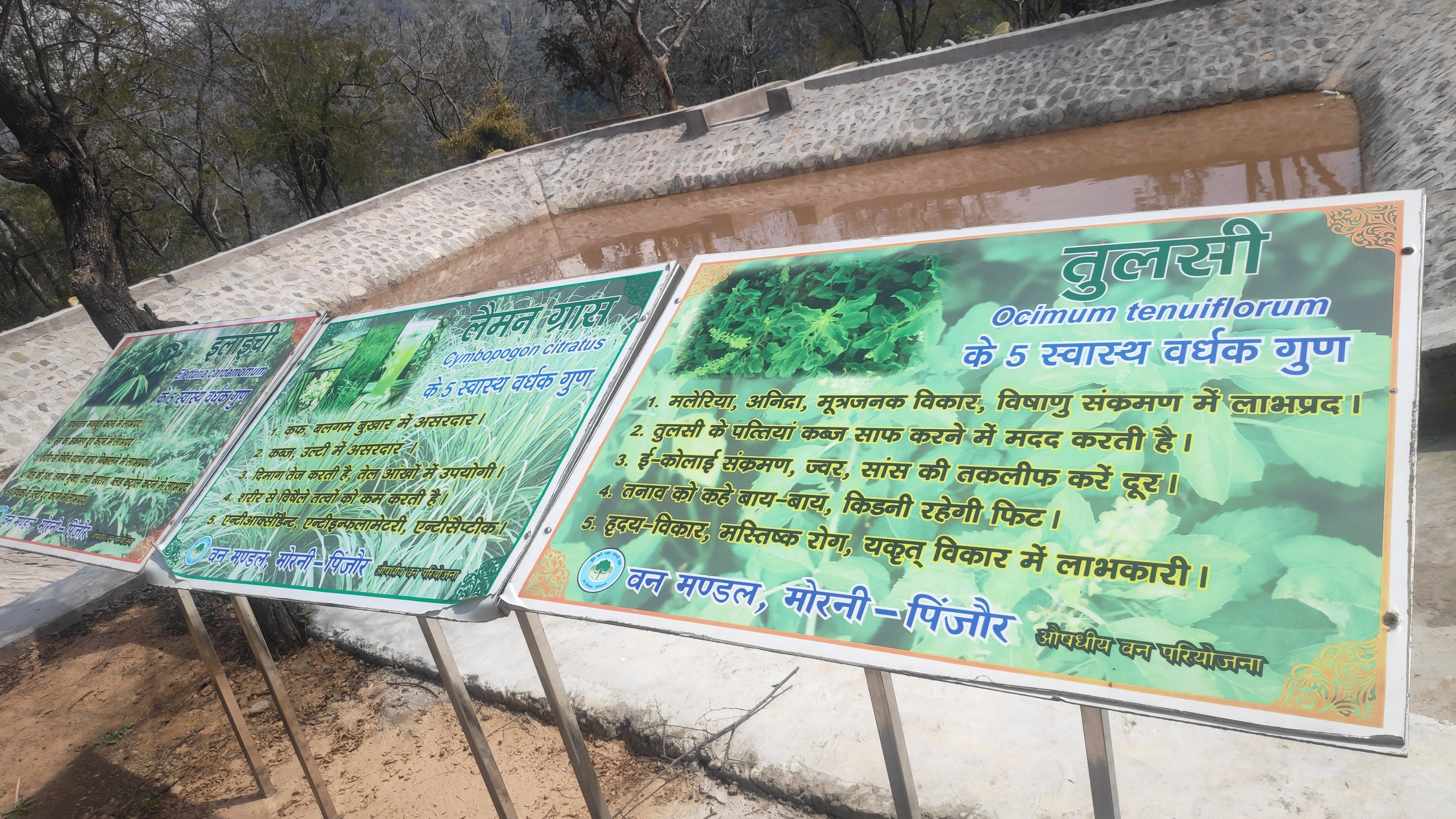

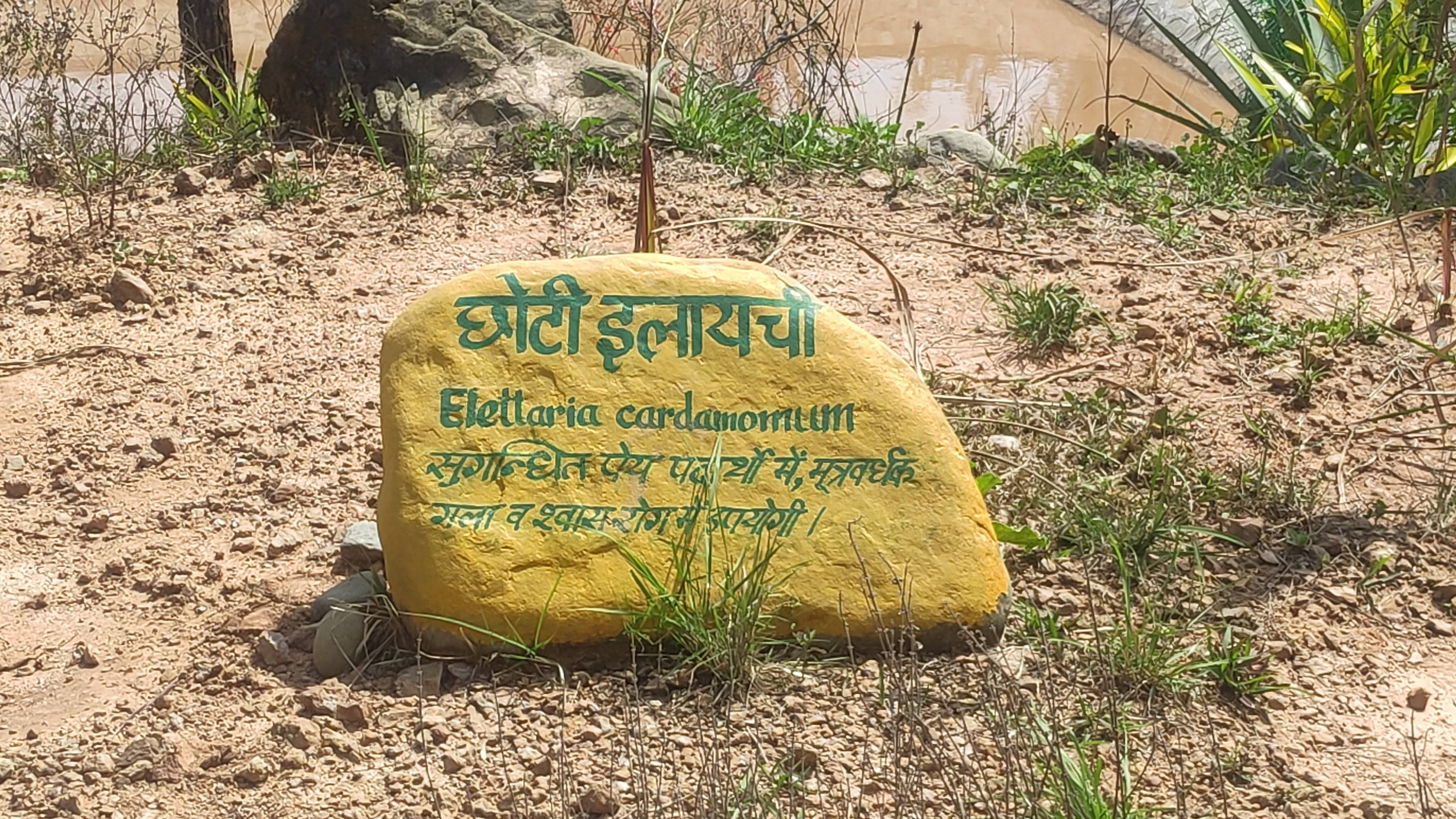

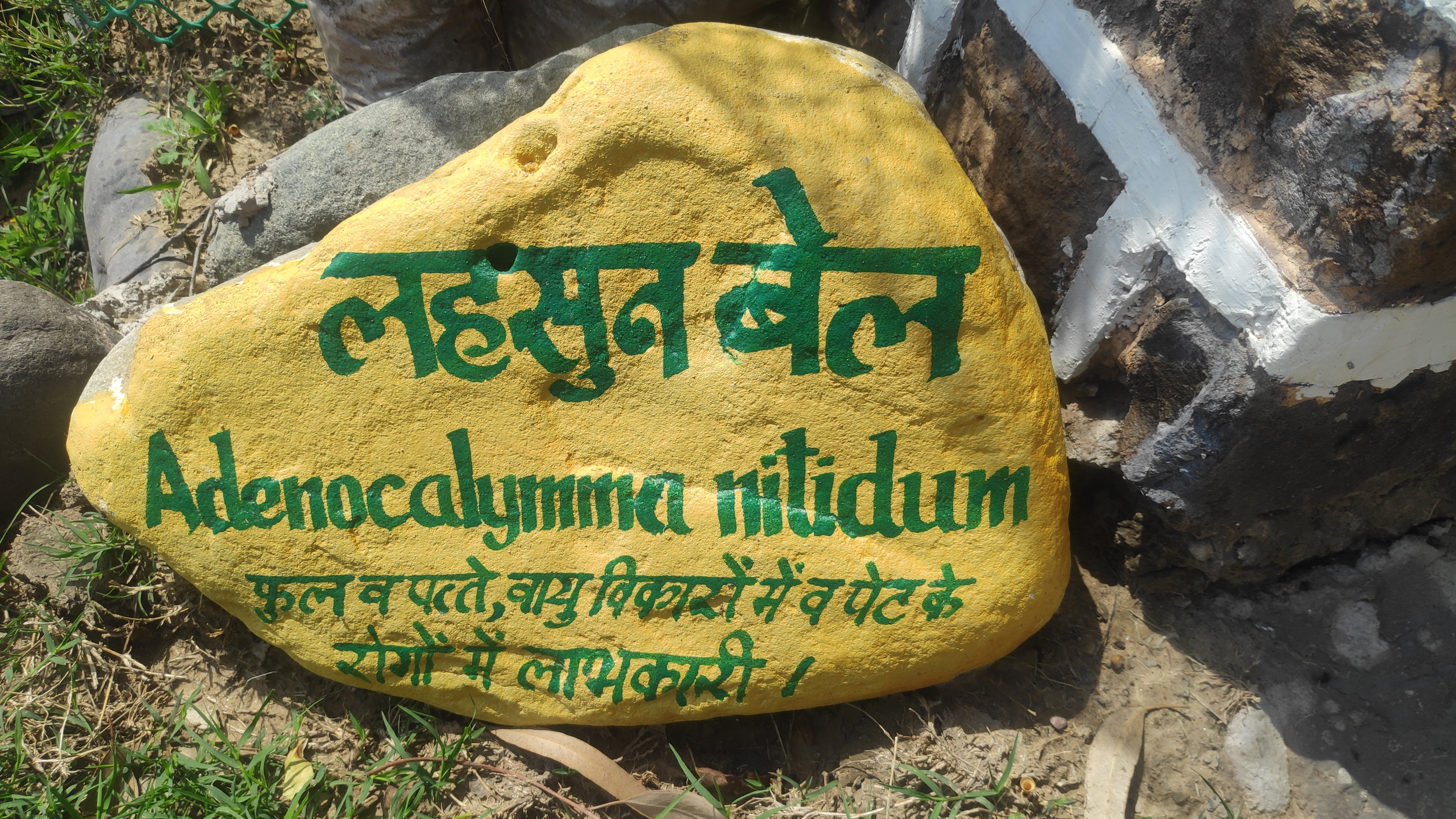

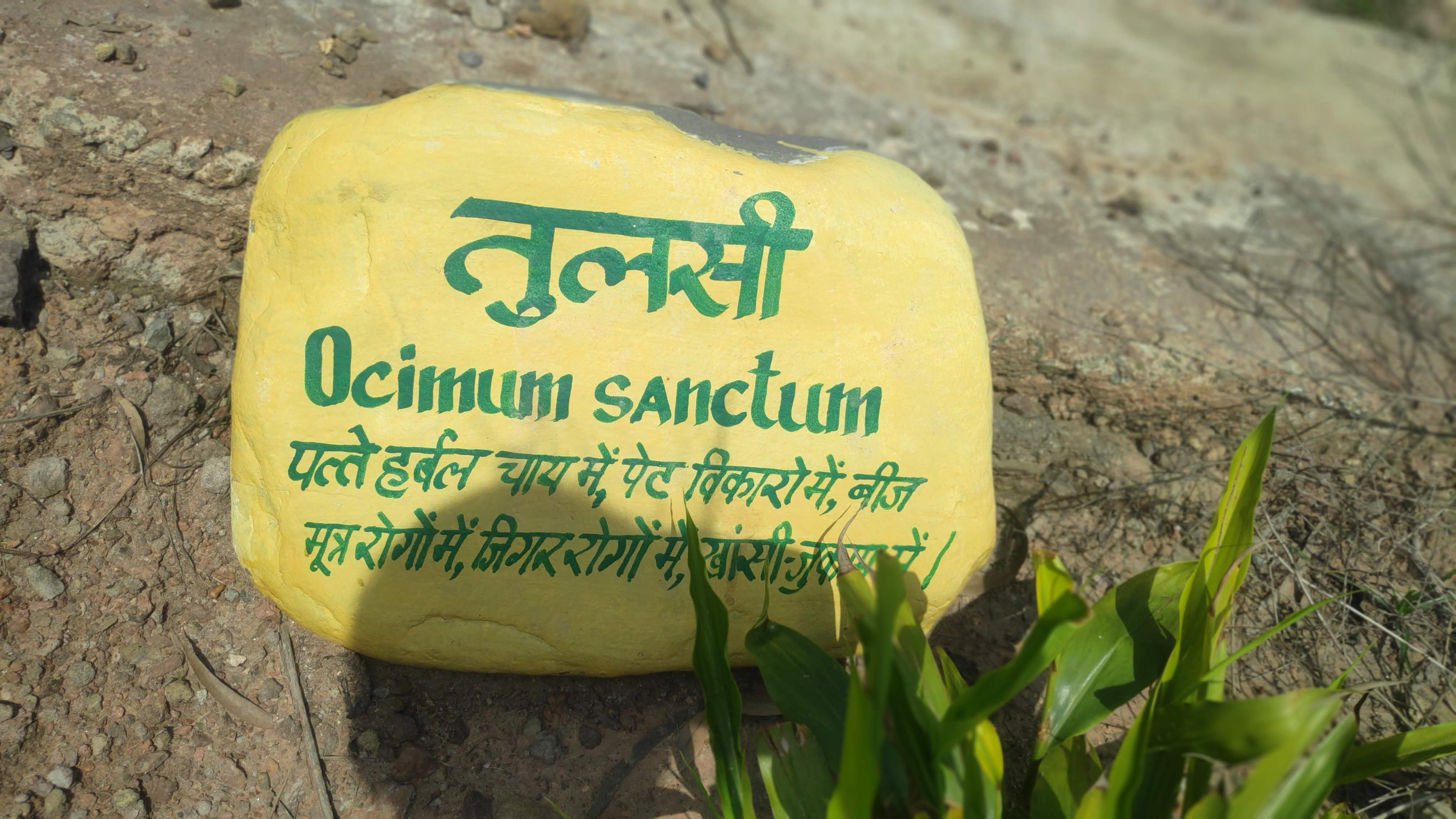

== Other Highlights ==
Haryana Chief Minister, Mr. Manohar Lal inaugurating 'Harad Vatika' in World Herbal Forest Project established at Morni Hills in the presence of Yoga Guru Swami Ramdev and Acharya Balkrishan, at Morni in district Panchkula on 20 December 2018.

According to Patanjali Yogpeeth, the Morni region was assigned a goal to develop 125 gardens out of which 65 gardens have been developed so far. Along with that, they congratulated the researchers of Yogpeeth on discovering 53 new species of herbs in the area stating that there were only 1062 species in the data previously whereas now it's at 1115.
