= Category C services =

Class of Canadian cable TV channel primarily for news and sports

A Category C service is the former term for a Canadian discretionary specialty channel which, as defined by the Canadian Radio-television and Telecommunications Commission, operates under the conditions of license for "competitive Canadian specialty services operating in the genres of mainstream sports and national news".

Under previous policies, these services were intentionally unprotected from competition by other Category B services of the same genre (as per the now-discontinued genre protection policy), but are still "protected" from competition by other discretionary services. In other words, if someone wants to launch a competing service, they must do so by committing to the same obligations, including common requirements for the exhibition and funding of Canadian-produced programming, as others. Discretionary services, by contrast, may not devote more than 10% of their monthly programming to live professional sports.

Channels licensed as mainstream news services must be offered on a packaged or standalone basis, but not necessarily on the lowest tier of service, by all Canadian television providers. Mainstream sports services are not subject to must-offer rules, and distributors must negotiate directly with their operators for carriage as with all other discretionary services.

== History ==
In an October 2008 public notice, the CRTC announced that it had considered the possibility of lifting format protection restrictions for channels of certain genres considered by the commission to be popular and diverse enough to support competition within Canada's television industry. In particular, the CRTC proposed to lift these restrictions for news and sports services, citing examples of Canadian channels which had remained popular and competitive with each other, despite the restrictions that had been forced in their licenses in order to negate such competition.

CTV Newsnet (now CTV News Channel), because it competed with CBC Newsworld (now CBC News Network), was licensed to serve as a "headline news" service, and was originally required to operate on a strict 15 minute news wheel format (similarly to the U.S. channel CNN Headline News). CTV however, successfully lobbied the CRTC in 2005 to have these conditions loosened in order to provide a more flexible service that still fell within its assigned scope.

On the other hand, TSN competes with Sportsnet and The Score (now Sportsnet 360)—which were licensed as national, regional, and sports news services respectively. Additionally, due to its licensing, The Score was restricted in the amount of live programming it can air. Similarly, TSN was facing scrutiny for having used policies, designed to allow timeshift channels for Western Canada, as a loophole to launch a second feed known as TSN2 for additional sports event programming. However, these complaints were dismissed by the CRTC.

Several months later, the CRTC officially announced in 2009 that it would be loosening format restrictions for all mainstream sports and national news services in the country, allowing them to use more streamlined and flexible licensing terms. As part of an overall restructuring of broadcasting regulations to prepare for the country's transition to digital terrestrial television, these channels became legally known as "category C" services beginning on September 1, 2011. Under further reforms, all specialty channels were transitioned to standardized conditions of license as discretionary services over the course of 2015 and 2016, although the CRTC still recognizes mainstream news and sports services as a distinct class of discretionary service with their own requirements.

=== Must-carry requirements for news channels ===
In September 2013, following the highly publicized, but unsuccessful bid by Quebecor Media to have Sun News Network converted to a Category A service, the CRTC opened a review on the possibility of adding mandatory distribution requirements for Category C national news services. The Commission acknowledged that its current policies had "barriers" that could prevent news channels from having a "pride of place" on the broadcast system, which could hinder their "exchange of ideas on matters of public concern." Previously, only the news networks of the Canadian Broadcasting Corporation were subject to formal carriage requirements; CBC News Network must be carried on a digital basic tier in French-language markets, and likewise Réseau de l'information must be carried on a digital basic tier in English-language markets.

On December 19, 2013, the CRTC announced the adoption of new must-offer requirements for Category C news channels. By March 19, 2014, Canadian television providers must offer all Category C news channels to subscribers as part of their lineup, and by May 18, 2014, all Category C news channels that are not already on the lowest level of service must be included in the "best available discretionary package consistent with their genre and programming", or offered to subscribers on a standalone basis. CRTC chairman Jean-Pierre Blais stated that the changes were to ensure that Canadians would be able to "[access] the news services that are of interest to them" and have "[opportunities] to be exposed to a variety of opinions on matters of public concern."

=== Conditions of license for news channels ===
In September 2015, as a result of discussions held as part of the "Let's Talk TV" initiative, the CRTC adopted stricter content requirements for services that operate as national news channels, in order to "better reflect the national nature of these services" and ensure they "demonstrate the capacity to gather news and report events happening throughout Canada." These include:

- An average of at least 16 hours per-day of original programming
- Providing updated news reports every 120 minutes.
- Dedicating 95% of their schedules to the program categories of news, analysis, long-form documentary, and "reporting and actualities"
- Maintaining a live broadcasting facility, and regional bureaus in at least three regions other than that of the facility.
- Having the ability to report on international news from a Canadian perspective.

The CRTC approved a third English-language discretionary news channel, The News Forum, in May 2022. It initially declined must-offer status to the channel as it did not meet the requirements for broadcasting updated news reports every 120 minutes; after amending its schedule to comply with the requirements, The News Forum subsequently received must-offer status in November 2022.

== List of national news and sports discretionary services ==
=== English ===
==== News ====
- CBC News Network
- CTV News Channel
- The News Forum

==== Sports ====
- Sportsnet regional feeds
  - Sportsnet East
  - Sportsnet Ontario
  - Sportsnet Pacific
  - Sportsnet West
- Sportsnet One
  - Sportsnet Canucks
  - Sportsnet Flames
  - Sportsnet Oilers
- TSN regional feeds (former analog)
  - TSN1
  - TSN2
  - TSN3
  - TSN4
  - TSN5

=== French ===
==== News ====
- Ici RDI
- LCN

==== Sports ====
- RDS
  - RDS
  - RDS2
- TVA Sports
  - TVA Sports 2

== Defunct Category C services ==
- Sun News Network

== See also ==
- List of television stations in Canada by call sign
- List of Canadian television networks (table)
- List of Canadian television channels
- List of Canadian specialty channels
- List of foreign television channels available in Canada
- List of United States stations available in Canada
- Digital television in Canada
- Multichannel television in Canada
- List of Canadian stations available in the United States
- List of television stations in North America by media market
