= Achu =

Achu is a name. Notable people with the name include:

- Naomi Achu, Cameroonian singer, rapper, and songwriter
- Simon Achidi Achu (1934–2021), Cameroonian politician; Prime Minister of Cameroon from 1992 to 1996
