= Afro (disambiguation) =

An afro is a hairstyle.

Afro, Afros, or AFRO may also refer to:

== Africa ==
- Afro-, relating to Africa
- Afro (currency), a possible name for the single currency of the proposed African Monetary Union
- AFRO, the African regional office of the World Health Organization
- ICFTU African Regional Organisation, a former regional union confederation

== People ==
- Afro Basaldella, an Italian painter and a member of the Scuola Romana
- Afro, a suggested name for African-Americans
- Afro, a Japanese manga artist who is known for creating the series Laid-Back Camp

== Art, entertainment, and media ==
- Afro (album), an album by trumpeter Dizzy Gillespie recorded in 1954
- Afro (genre), a genre of Cuban popular music
- "Afro" (1994), song by the Jon Spencer Blues Explosion
- AFRO, a North American television network from Afrotainment
- Baltimore Afro-American, a newspaper

== Vessels ==
- SS Empire Carpenter, a cargo ship built in 1942, later named SS Afro

== See also ==
- List of commonly used taxonomic affixes
- Afro, a brand name of methyltestosterone
