= List of television stations in Canada =

This is a list of television stations in Canada licensed to broadcast by the Canadian Radio-television and Telecommunications Commission (CRTC), all having call signs which begin with the letter C.

A blue background indicates a station that continues to broadcast exclusively via an analogue transmission in lieu of a conversion to digital broadcasting. A dark blue background indicates a station that acts as the flagship of a television network (CBC, Ici Radio-Canada, TVA, CTV, Citytv and Global) or a television system (CTV 2, CBC North and Omni).

Note that in recent years most Canadian television stations affiliated with a network are generally no longer identified by their call letters on air for the purposes of branding. For example, CFQC-DT in Saskatoon is branded as "CTV Saskatoon" and so on.

See also the list of Canadian television networks.

Call sign	Location	TV	RF	Network/system
CBAFT-DT	Moncton, NB	11	11	Ici Radio-Canada
CBAT-DT	Fredericton, NB	4	31	CBC
CBCT-DT	Charlottetown, PEI	13	13	CBC
CBET-DT	Windsor, ON	9	9	CBC
CBFT-DT	Montreal, QC	2	19	Ici Radio-Canada
CBHT-DT	Halifax, NS	3	39	CBC
CBKFT-DT	Regina, SK	13	13	Ici Radio-Canada
CBKT-DT	Regina, SK	9	9	CBC
CBLFT-DT	Toronto, ON	25	25	Ici Radio-Canada
CBLT-DT	Toronto, ON	5	20	CBC
CBMT-DT	Montreal, QC	6	21	CBC
CBNT-DT	St. John's, NL	8	8	CBC
CBOFT-DT	Ottawa, ON	9	33	Ici Radio-Canada
CBOT-DT	Ottawa, ON	4	25	CBC
CBRT-DT	Calgary, AB	9	21	CBC
CBUFT-DT	Vancouver, BC	26	26	Ici Radio-Canada
CBUT-DT	Vancouver, BC	2	43	CBC
CBVT-DT	Quebec City, QC	11	25	Ici Radio-Canada
CBWFT-DT	Winnipeg, MB	3	51	Ici Radio-Canada
CBWT-DT	Winnipeg, MB	6	27	CBC
CBXFT-DT	Edmonton, AB	11	47	Ici Radio-Canada
CBXT-DT	Edmonton, AB	5	42	CBC
CFAP-DT	Quebec City, QC	2	39	Noovo
CFCF-DT	Montreal, QC	12	12	CTV
CFCM-DT	Quebec City, QC	4	17	TVA
CFCN-DT	Calgary, AB	4	29	CTV
CFEG-DT	Abbotsford, BC	28	19	Independent
CFEM-DT	Rouyn-Noranda, QC	13	13	TVA
CFER-DT	Rimouski, QC	11	11	TVA
CFGS-DT	Gatineau, QC/Ottawa, ON	34	34	Noovo
CFHD-DT	Montreal, QC	47	47	Independent
CFJC-TV	Kamloops, BC	4 (analogue)		Citytv
CFJP-DT	Montreal, QC	35	35	Noovo
CFKM-DT	Trois-Rivières, QC	16	34	Noovo
CFKS-DT	Sherbrooke, QC	30	30	Noovo
CFMT-DT	Toronto, ON	47	30	Omni
CFPL-DT	London, ON	10	10	CTV 2
CFQC-DT	Saskatoon, SK	8	8	CTV
CFRE-DT	Regina, SK	11	11	Global
CFRN-DT	Edmonton, AB	3	12	CTV
CFRS-DT	Saguenay, QC	4	13	Noovo
CFSK-DT	Saskatoon, SK	4	42	Global
CFSO-TV	Cardston, AB	32 (analogue)		Independent
CFTF-DT	Rivière-du-Loup, QC	29	29	Noovo
CFTK-TV	Terrace, BC	3 (analogue)		CTV 2
CFTM-DT	Montreal, QC	10	10	TVA
CFTO-DT	Toronto, ON	9	8	CTV
CFTO-DT21	Orillia, ON	21	21	CTV
CFTO-DT54	Peterborough, ON	54	35	CTV
CFTU-DT	Montreal, QC	29	29	Independent
CFTV-DT	Leamington, ON	34	34	Independent
CFVS-DT	Val-d'Or, QC	25	25	Noovo
CFYK-DT	Yellowknife, NT	8	8	CBC North (CBC)
CHAN-DT	Vancouver, BC	8	22	Global
CHAT-TV	Medicine Hat, AB	6 (analogue)		Citytv
CHAU-DT	Carleton, QC	5	5	TVA
CHBC-DT	Kelowna, BC	2	27	Global
CHBX-TV	Sault Ste. Marie, ON	2 (analogue)		CTV
CHCH-DT	Hamilton, ON	11	15	Independent
CHCO-DT	St. Andrews, NB	26	26	Independent
CHEK-DT	Victoria, BC	6	49	Independent/Yes TV
CHEM-DT	Trois-Rivières, QC	8	8	TVA
CHET-DT	Chetwynd, BC	28	28	Independent
CHEX-DT	Peterborough, ON	12	12	Global
CHFD-DT	Thunder Bay, ON	4	4	Global
CHLT-DT	Sherbrooke, QC	7	7	TVA
CHMG-DT	Quebec City, QC	10	10	Independent
CHMI-DT	Winnipeg, MB	13	13	Citytv
CHNB-DT	Saint John, NB	12	12	Global
CHNE-TV	Chéticamp, NS	36 (analogue)		Independent
CHNM-DT	Vancouver, BC	42	20	Omni
CHNU-DT	Fraser Valley, BC	66	47	Yes TV
CHOB-TV	Maskwacis, AB	43 (analogue)		Independent
CHOT-DT	Gatineau, QC/Ottawa, ON	40	32	TVA
CHRO-TV	Pembroke, ON	43	7	CTV 2
CHRO-DT43	Ottawa, ON	43	35	CTV 2
CHRO-TV	Pembroke, ON	5 (analogue)		CTV 2
CHWI-DT	Windsor, ON	16	16	CTV 2
CICA-TV	Toronto, ON	19	19	Independent
CICC-TV	Yorkton, SK	10 (analogue)		CTV
CICI-TV	Sudbury, ON	5 (analogue)		CTV
CICT-DT	Calgary, AB	2	41	Global
CIHC-TV	Hay River, NT	5 (analogue)		Independent
CIHF-DT	Halifax, NS	8	8	Global
CIII-DT	Toronto, ON	41	17	Global
CIIT-DT	Winnipeg, MB	35	35	Independent
CIMC-TV	Isle Madame, NS	10 (analogue)		Independent
CIMT-DT	Rivière-du-Loup, QC	9	9	TVA
CIPA-TV	Prince Albert, SK	9 (analogue)		CTV
CISA-DT	Lethbridge, AB	7	7	Global
CITL-DT	Lloydminster, AB/SK	4	4	CTV
CITO-TV	Timmins, ON	3 (analogue)		CTV
CITS-DT	Burlington, ON	36	14	Yes TV
CITV-DT	Edmonton, AB	13	13	Global
CITY-DT	Toronto, ON	57	18	Citytv
CIVI-DT	Victoria, BC	23	23	CTV 2
CIVM-DT	Montreal, QC	17	26	Télé-Québec
CIVT-DT	Vancouver, BC	32	32	CTV
CJBN-TV	Kenora, ON	13 (analogue)		Global
CJBR-DT	Rimouski, QC	2	45	Ici Radio-Canada
CJCB-DT	Sydney, NS	4	25	CTV
CJCH-DT	Halifax, NS	5	48	CTV
CJCO-DT	Calgary, AB	38	38	Omni
CJDC-TV	Dawson Creek, BC	5 (analogue)		CTV 2
CJEO-DT	Edmonton, AB	56	44	Omni
CJIL-DT	Lethbridge, AB	17	17	Independent
CJMT-DT	Toronto, ON	40	26	Omni
CJNT-DT	Montreal, QC	62	49	Citytv
CJOH-DT	Ottawa, ON	13	16	CTV
CJON-DT	St. John's, NL	21	21	Independent
CJPM-DT	Saguenay, QC	6	46	TVA
CKAL-DT	Calgary, AB	5	49	Citytv
CKCK-DT	Regina, SK	2	8	CTV
CKCO-DT	Kitchener, ON	13	13	CTV
CKCS-DT	Calgary, AB	32	32	Yes TV
CKCW-DT	Moncton, NB	29	29	CTV
CKEM-DT	Edmonton, AB	51	17	Citytv
CKES-DT	Edmonton, AB	30	30	Yes TV
CKLT-DT	Saint John, NB	9	9	CTV
CKMI-DT	Quebec City, QC	15	20	Global
CKND-DT	Winnipeg, MB	9	40	Global
CKNY-TV	North Bay, ON	10	12	CTV
CKPG-TV	Prince George, BC	2 (analogue)		Citytv
CKPR-DT	Thunder Bay, ON	2	2	CTV
CKRT-DT	Rivière-du-Loup, QC	7	7	Ici Radio-Canada
CKSA-DT	Lloydminster, AB/SK	2	2	Global
CKSH-DT	Sherbrooke, QC	9	9	Ici Radio-Canada
CKTM-DT	Trois-Rivières, QC	13	28	Ici Radio-Canada
CKTV-DT	Saguenay, QC	12	12	Ici Radio-Canada
CKVR-DT	Barrie, ON	3	9	CTV 2
CKVU-DT	Vancouver, BC	10	33	Citytv
CKWS-DT	Kingston, ON	11	11	Global
CKY-DT	Winnipeg, MB	7	7	CTV

== Other channels ==
The following is a list of other channels (network cable only channels, former OTA channels, pirate channels) that are Canadian non-specialty channels that do not fall in either categories A, B, or C.

Channel name	Type/network	Language	Location	Ownership
APTN East	APTN	English, French, Aboriginal	Winnipeg, MB	Aboriginal Peoples Television Network
APTN West	APTN	English, French, Aboriginal	Winnipeg, MB	Aboriginal Peoples Television Network
APTN HD	APTN	English, French, Aboriginal	Winnipeg, MB	Aboriginal Peoples Television Network
CTV 2 Alberta	CTV 2	English	Edmonton, AB	Bell Media
CTV 2 Atlantic	CTV 2	English	Halifax, NS	Bell Media
Citytv Saskatchewan	Citytv	English	Regina, SK	Rogers Communications
Knowledge Network	Educational	English	Burnaby, BC	Government of British Columbia
Shaw Multicultural Channel	Multicultural	Ethnic	Vancouver, BC	Shaw Communications
Cable 14	Community	English	Hamilton, ON	Cogeco, Shaw Communications, Source Cable
Coast Cable 11	Community	English	BC	Coast Cable Communications
NAC TV (CH5248)	Community	English	Neepawa, MB	Neepawa Resource Centre
WGCtv	Community	English	Brandon, MB	Westman Communications Group
EastLink TV	Cable operator	English	ON, QC, NS, NB, PEI	EastLink TV
Shaw Spotlight	Cable operator	English	Various cities	Shaw Communications
Shaw Spotlight	Cable operator	English	Kenora, ON	Shaw Communications
YourTV	Cable operator	English	Kingston, ON	Cogeco
YourTV	Cable operator	English	North Bay, ON	Cogeco
YourTV	Cable operator	English	Windsor, ON	Cogeco
TFO	Educational	French	Toronto, ON	Government of Ontario
Rogers TV	Cable operator	English	ON	Rogers Communications
TV Rogers	Cable operator	French	ON	Rogers Communications
TVC9 Cablevision	Cable operator	French	Val-d'Or, QC	
MAtv	Cable operator	French	QC	Vidéotron
Canal Info Videotron	Cable operator	French	QC	Vidéotron
TSC	Shopping	English	Canada	Rogers Communications
Made in Punjab TV	Indian	Punjabi	BC	Navalpreet Rangi
ShopTV Canada (defunct)	Shopping	English	Canada	Torstar
Star Ray TV	Pirate	English	Toronto, ON	
House of Assembly Channel	Parliamentary	English	NL	Government of Newfoundland and Labrador
Legislative Television	Parliamentary	English	NS	Government of Nova Scotia
Legislative Assembly of New Brunswick Television Service	Parliamentary	English	NB	Government of New Brunswick
Ontario Parliament Network	Parliamentary	English	ON	Government of Ontario
Saskatchewan Legislative Network	Parliamentary	English	SK	Government of Saskatchewan
Hansard TV	Parliamentary	English	BC	Government of British Columbia
Canal de l'Assemblée nationale	Parliamentary	French	QC	Government of Quebec

== See also ==
- Media of Canada
- Television in Canada
- List of television stations in Canada by call sign
- List of Canadian television networks (table)
- List of Canadian television channels
- List of Canadian specialty channels
- Category A services
- Category B services
- Category C services
- List of foreign television channels available in Canada
- List of United States stations available in Canada
- Digital television in Canada
- Multichannel television in Canada
- List of Canadian stations available in the United States
- List of television stations in North America by media market
- List of defunct Canadian television stations
