= GKP =

GKP may refer to:

- German Kino Plus, an American German-language television channel
- Gorakhpur Junction railway station
- Gulf Keystone Petroleum, a British oil and gas exploration company operating in Iraqi Kurdistan
- Guinea Kpelle language
- The General Knowledge Paper, run by King William's College
