= Eddy Bee =

Cameroonian musician

Eddy Agborchi Besong, better known by the stage name of Eddy Bee, also known as Mr R&B, is a Cameroonian Afrobeat and RnB artist.

He has been in the music scene since 2009, releasing a mixtape in 2010 as part of a trio group called Avinu C including Naomi Achu and H Bolo. He later on pursued a solo career as Eddy Bee. Eddy Bee released his debut album “The Eddy Bee Show” in November 2018.

== Discography ==
- "I want to marry you"(2014)
- "Thank you"(2016)
- "I Do"(2016)
