= The News Forum =

Canadian television news channel

- Country: Canada
- Broadcast area: Nationwide
- Headquarters: St. Catharines, Ontario

Ownership
- Owner: The News Forum Inc.

History
- Launched: August 27, 2020; 6 years ago
- Founder: Tore Stautland

Links
- Website: www.thenewsforum.ca

Availability

Terrestrial
- Rogers: Channel 107
- Telus: Channel 842
- Cogeco Cable: Channel 806
- Shaw Direct: Channel 253

The News Forum is a Canadian English language news channel owned by The News Forum Inc., a group founded by Tore Stautland. Launched on August 26, 2020, the channel primarily broadcasts news commentary and talk shows, with the network having described itself at launch as being "politically balanced" and inclusive of conservative perspectives. After initially operating as a license-exempt service, the service received formal CRTC licensing as a national news discretionary service in November 2022.

== History ==
The News Forum was founded by Tore Stautland, who previously worked for ZoomerMedia's Faith TV and Joytv. At launch, the network described itself as offering "politically balanced domestic and international perspectives, inclusive of a conservative counterbalance for the current media landscape", with Broadcast Dialogue referring to the channel as being "right of centre". Ethnic Channels Group was contracted to provide advertising and distribution services for the network. It launched with a three-month free preview on Bell Fibe TV and Bell Satellite TV on August 27, 2020. However, its presence went unnoticed by most Canadian media outlets until a trailer and press release announcing its launch was released on September 29.

Its launch lineup featured hosts and pundits such as former Conservative Party minister Tony Clement, former 2018 Ontario Progressive Conservative candidate Tanya Granic Allen, and former CHFD anchor Nima Rajan. They were later joined by former Alberta Wildrose Party leader (now Premier of Alberta) Danielle Smith, Conservative MP Dean Allison, and former BNN Bloomberg anchor Catherine Murray.

As Stautland is not currently a Canadian citizen, his 22.25% equity stake in the network (shared with his wife Jule) is represented as a voting trust to comply with CRTC rules, as only Canadian citizens may hold broadcast licences. The trust will be dissolved if Stautland becomes a Canadian citizen. The remainder of the network is owned by a group of other unnamed shareholders. 92.3% of the network's ownership, which is incorporated as The News Forum Inc., is held by Canadian shareholders.

The News Forum initially operated as an exempted discretionary service. In October 2021, The News Forum filed an application with the CRTC for formal licensing as a national news discretionary service, requiring that it be offered by all Canadian television providers as with CBC News Network and CTV News Channel.

On May 17, 2022, the CRTC granted a licence to The News Forum as a national news discretionary service, but declined its request for must-offer status since its schedule did not meet a quota for regularly-updated news programming. In July 2022, The News Forum submitted another application for must-offer status, which included a proposed schedule adding regular news updates between 6:00 a.m. and 8:00 p.m. ET daily. On November 1, 2022, the CRTC granted The News Forum's request for must-offer status, finding that its schedule now met the programming requirements for national news discretionary services.

== Programming ==
The channel's programming consists primarily of news commentary and discussion programs. Its main newscast is Forum Daily, which is drawn primarily from Canadian Press wire stories.

== See also ==
- Sun News Network
