= Multichannel television in Canada =

Canadian television services

Canada is served by various multichannel television services, including cable television systems, two direct-broadcast satellite providers, and various other wireline IPTV and wireless MMDS video providers.

Canadian multichannel television providers are legally referred to as broadcast distribution undertakings (BDUs). They must be licensed by the Canadian Radio-television and Telecommunications Commission (CRTC) and comply with its policies, including those on the packaging of their services. Additionally, the CRTC licences specialty channels; licensing was previously mandatory for all services, and restrictions were placed on their content in order to discourage direct competition in certain categories. The CRTC began to phase out these policies by the 2010s, and in 2012, it began exempting networks with less than 200,000 subscribers, as well as certain ethnic services not broadcasting in Canada's official or indigenous languages, from formal licensing. Per its New Media exemption order, the CRTC does not regulate internet television or video content delivered over the public internet, such as over-the-top subscription services.

Some of the CRTC's policies in regard to multichannel television are intended to protect and encourage the production of Canadian content, and prevent foreign broadcasters from unduly harming domestic outlets. U.S. and international channels can be authorized for distribution in Canada if they are deemed to not be unduly competitive to Canadian outlets (although their programming may be affected by differing broadcast rights). Affiliates of the U.S. ABC, CBS, Fox, NBC, and PBS networks are also readily available in Canada, but their programming is subject to a CRTC rule known as simultaneous substitution (or simsub), which gives Canadian broadcast stations within a viewer's market the right to require that U.S. feeds of programs be substituted by BDUs with their own if they are broadcasting the same program in simulcast. This rule serves to protect Canadian advertising revenue.

The majority of Canada's multichannel television industry is dominated by vertically integrated companies and their respective services, including Bell Canada's Bell Satellite TV satellite and fibreoptic Fibe TV IPTV services, Rogers Communications' cable systems (primarily in Ontario and Atlantic Canada), Shaw Communications' cable systems (primarily in Western Canada; the Shaw family also owns Corus Entertainment, a major operator of Canadian specialty channels), Telus' Optik TV and Vidéotron (which operates mainly in its home province of Quebec, and is owned by local conglomerate Quebecor).

== Platforms ==
=== Cable television ===
==== History ====
In 1949, the Broadcast Relay Service began negotiations for the implementation of what was to be the first large scale cable television system in North America. The development of the system relied on reaching an agreement with the Quebec Hydro-Electric Commission to utilise their existing network of power poles supplying power to the Montreal metropolitan area. Initial discussions began with a meeting with the Montreal City Council on June 21, 1949. After many months of negotiation, an agreement was reached between Hydro Quebec and Rediffusion Inc. on February 28, 1950, for an initial five-year period. The Rediffusion cable system began operation in 1952, and eventually supplied 80,000 homes in Montreal, Quebec.

Cable television in Canada began in 1952 with community antenna connections in Vancouver and London; as to which city was first to launch such a service is not clear. Initially, the systems brought American stations to viewers in Canada who had no Canadian stations to watch; broadcast television, though begun late in 1952 in Toronto and Montreal, did not reach a majority of cities until 1954.

By the early 1970s cable television was spreading in Canada faster than anywhere else in the world. In time, cable was widely established to carry available Canadian stations as well as import American stations, which constituted the vast majority of signals on systems. Canadians used two thirds of their television time on American channels; unconnected cities complained when the Canadian Radio and Television Commission (CRTC) threatened to stop cable expansion. The CRTC implemented Canadian content rules to encourage domestic production.

During the 1970s, a growing number of Canadian stations pushed American channels off the systems, forcing several to expand beyond the original 12-channel system configurations. At the same time, the advent of fibre-optic technology enabled companies to extend their systems to nearby towns and villages that by themselves were not viable cable television markets. In 1977–78, regional cable services such Telecable (now Shaw Communications) and Cable Regina (now Access Communications) in Saskatchewan began to emerge, offering access to American networks for the first time, though a third system, CPN, which offered specialty channels such as HBO, failed after two years.

Specialty television channels available only on cable began to be established in 1983, and systems continued to expand and upgrade their channel capacity, notably by deploying fibre-optics to carry signals as far as neighbourhoods before converting to coaxial cable for the final run to the customer premises. The use of fibre optic cables as far back as the 1970s does not imply that cable companies were using digital methods to transmit signals as is sometimes assumed by the modern viewer, this is a common misunderstanding. Methods were developed and deployed as far back as the 1970s to transmit analog video using frequency division multiplexing via fibre-optic cabling. Digital signaling is a much more modern practice which only began in the early 2000s. Two-way capabilities were introduced, and larger systems were able to use "addressable" descramblers to offer pay television services and different tiers of channels.

Cable television began to face serious competition from DTH satellite services in the late 1990s. Telephone companies and cable television providers have since been permitted, in most parts of Canada, to compete to provide services originally provided by the other. Cable television services are not the prime providers of broadband Internet in Canada, but they are a very strong competitor for the service.

During the early 1970s, Canadian television stations obtained regulatory rulings that required cable television operators to substitute their signals for distant (usually American) stations carrying the same television program at the same time. This was to protect the stations' advertising sales.

Many systems were originally locally owned, and many large cities had several providers each covering specific sections of a city; sometimes these territories were established by a "gentleman's agreement" between system owners. Hamilton, Ontario, had six different operators. London had two, with a very convoluted dividing line in the old south neighbourhood; Rogers eventually bought the companies that ran those two systems, merging them, a pattern repeated elsewhere. Even before mergers, companies in the same community collaborated to operate the community channel.

A long series of consolidations and acquisitions rapidly brought most major cities' systems under the ownership of a small number of large companies. Some of the largest companies even applied for regulator permission to swap systems in order to consolidate their operations: Shaw sold systems in eastern Canada to Rogers, buying Rogers systems in western Canada.

Presently, cable is provided to most cities and towns, depending on the region, by companies such as Rogers, Shaw, Vidéotron, Cogeco, Cable Axion, and EastLink. Most of these "first-generation" cable companies do not compete with each other, as the CRTC has traditionally licensed only one cable provider per market. Even in markets where more than one distributor has been licensed, each has an exclusive territory within the market.

=== IPTV ===
In the early 2000s, IPTV services began to emerge in some markets as an alternative to digital cable. IPTV service is typically delivered over a private, Internet Protocol network using a phone company's copper or fibre to the home infrastructure, and offers a similar user experience and features to a digital cable service.

IPTV has seen wide adoption in Western Canada; Saskatchewan's government-owned telecom SaskTel was the first provider in Canada to launch an IPTV service, followed by Manitoba Telecom Services (MTS) in 2004, and later Telus in Alberta and British Columbia. Bell Canada has offered IPTV, first in Atlantic Canada, and later in metropolitan Ontario and Quebec, and Manitoba (following its purchase of MTS), under the Bell Fibe TV brand. IPTV services have also been launched by smaller regional providers such as Vmedia.

Cable providers such as Rogers (using Comcast's X1 platform) and Cogeco have also been phasing out traditional digital cable in favour of IPTV-based services delivered over their cable Internet networks,

=== Satellite television ===
In Canada, the two legal DBS services available are Bell Satellite TV and Shaw Direct. The Canadian Radio-television and Telecommunications Commission has refused to license American satellite services, but nonetheless hundreds of thousands (up to a million by some estimates) of Canadians access or have accessed American services – usually these services have to be billed to an American address and are paid for in U.S. dollars, although many viewers receive American signals through pirate decryption. Whether such activity is grey market or black market is the source of often heated debate between those who would like greater choice and those who argue that the protection of Canadian firms and Canadian culture is more important.

Canadian satellite providers continue to be plagued by the unquestionably black market devices which "pirate" or "steal" their signals as well as by a number of otherwise completely lawful devices which can be reprogrammed to receive pirated television signals.

Karl Péladeau, CEO of Québecor (which owns cable television provider Vidéotron) is on public record as demanding conditions be placed on the CRTC licence issued to Bell Satellite TV, due to Bell TV's reputation for vastly inferior security compared to its cable rivals and Shaw Cable-owned Shaw Direct.

Although there are no official statistics, the use of American satellite services in Canada appears to be declining as of 2004.

Some would claim that this is probably due to a combination of increasingly aggressive police enforcement and an unfavourable exchange rate between the Canadian and U.S. currencies. As the U.S. dollar has been declining as of 2005 versus other international currencies, the decline in DirecTV viewership in Canada may well be related not to a cost difference as much as to the series of smart card swaps which have rendered the first three generations of DirecTV access cards (F, H and HU) all obsolete.

=== Other platforms ===
In some areas, an additional option is a form of over-the-air broadcasting, either via a multichannel multipoint distribution service, also known as "wireless cable", or via encrypted low-power transmissions in the NTSC format. This type of distribution is most commonly used in the territories (Yukon, Northwest Territories and Nunavut), which are too sparsely populated to make conventional cable a financially viable operation. The fate of such capacity-limited services, heading into the era of digital television, is uncertain.

=== Subscribers (2017 Q1) ===
1. BCE Inc. (2.734 million)
2. Shaw (2.507 million)
3. Rogers (1.796 million)
4. Vidéotron (1.722 million)
5. Telus (1.070 million)
6. Cogeco (0.738 million)

Total: 10.526 million

== Programming ==
=== Specialty channels ===
Specialty channels—legally known as "programming undertakings"—must be licensed by the CRTC once they exceed 200,000 subscribers, unless they broadcast 90% of their programming in a language other than English, French, or the languages of Canadian aboriginal peoples. Certain types of services are exempt from CRTC licensing, such as channels whose content consist purely of text and graphics without video content, and channels which consist of only teleshopping and/or infomercials.

The CRTC previously used multiple types of licences, but since November 2016 it has only used two standardized sets of licence terms: a discretionary service, and services that provide a national news or mainstream sports service (formerly known as a "category C" licence). Under the standardized conditions of licence for discretionary services, their only significant programming restriction are that they may not dedicate more than 10% of their programming per-month to "live professional sports" programming.

All specialty channels were formerly subject to "genre protection" rules, which prohibited all specialty channels from directly competing against other services with a "Category A" licence. For example, to protect TSN, The Score (now Sportsnet 360) was specifically licensed to serve as a sports news service (instead of a mainstream, national sports network), and was therefore limited in the amount of live programming it could air. However, following inquiries into the matter, the CRTC announced in 2009 that it would begin to allow leeway in certain broader categories, such as news and sports.

To prevent them from airing programming from outside their designated format, the CRTC employed a system of "program categories", specifying how much of a service's weekly programming could be devoted to specific genres and classes of programming. As part of "Let's Talk TV", an initiative to implement reforms of Canada's broadcasting industry, the CRTC announced in 2015 that it planned to phase out the genre protection rules, and "Category A" licensing (which carried must-offer status, and prohibited other specialty channels from directly competing with them) by 2017 for larger conglomerates, and 2018 for independent broadcasters. The CRTC cited new regulations on how television providers must package their services—including a mandate to offer "pick and pay" purchasing of individual channels by December 2016, and a future requirement for vertically integrated providers to offer a service owned by a third-party for each co-owned service they offer; the Commission felt that these restrictions were "no longer needed to ensure programming diversity between services", as "[they] limited programming services to offering certain types of programming and precluded other services from offering that programming."

=== Foreign channels ===
In addition to these specialty channels, certain foreign channels, most commonly American cable networks such as CNN and Spike, are permitted.

In general, foreign channels are permitted provided that they are deemed not to directly compete with Canadian channels at the time of their introduction. In rejecting a 2003 application proposing the addition of several U.S.-based channels, the CRTC stated that by allowing Canadian channels to maintain control over these types of programming, they are able to fully access the available advertising and subscription revenues, which would otherwise flow outside the country, in order to fund Canadian programming. Examples of well-known U.S. channels not permitted in Canada include FX, Nickelodeon, ESPN, HBO, Showtime, USA Network and TNT (however, Canadian broadcasters have since launched licensed versions of FX, HBO and Nickelodeon, while TSN is minority-owned by ESPN); nonetheless some Canadians choose to subscribe to these channels via the grey market, as outlined above. Although it is not an approved foreign cable channel, TBS was also available in Canada until 2007 via the superstation WTBS (now WPCH-TV).

The commission is also permitted to revoke a foreign channel's status should another channel launch within the same genre. However, the only time the CRTC has unilaterally removed an American channel from the eligible services list – that is, without the consent of the American broadcaster – was at the launch of New Country Network, when the American channel CMT was removed. This led to a protracted dispute eventually resolved by the sale of a stake in NCN (now CMT Canada) to CMT. Since then, the CRTC has been more lenient on existing eligible channels; Spike and Comedy Central have retained their eligibility despite the launch of mentv and Comedy. Even if a channel is approved, other issues such as programming rights may prevent their carriage, as in the cases of Comedy Central and, until late 2006, AMC and TCM.

U.S. cable networks are not subject to the same simsub rules as American broadcast stations. However, unlike the broadcast stations, cable networks must own all applicable programming rights, and may be forced to provide alternate programming if they do not.

=== Premium services ===
"Pay television" services were launched in Canada in the early 1980s but were largely unsuccessful in their original form. Many shut down, and two (TSN and MuchMusic) converted to specialty services as that format became more successful. However, movie-oriented premium services, including English-language Crave and French-language Super Écran (which are both divisions of Bell Media), have become very successful and very profitable, more so in recent years thanks to the shift towards digital television and the success of original series from sources such as HBO.

Crave—then The Movie Network, along with a secondary service known as Movie Central, were granted monopoly positions, with each having exclusivity in the eastern and western half of Canada respectively. The two services were joined by Super Channel, a national premium service led by the original owners of Movie Central, in 2007. Movie Central was wound down in 2016, with The Movie Network replacing Movie Central nationwide. Many third-language or "ethnic" services are mostly treated as premium services by cable and satellite operators, and sold separately from mainstream packages.

Family Channel was previously licensed as a pay service, and was commercial-free until November 1, 2016, but is typically treated as and currently bundled with other specialty channels by television providers. As part of its "Let's Talk TV" initiative, the CRTC proposed that the legal distinction between premium and specialty services be removed, and replaced by a single, unified category known as Discretionary services. DHX Media, owner of Family Channel, argued that with the ongoing deregulation of specialty services and the removal the genre protection rules, Family would be at a disadvantage in comparison to other specialty channels because of its inability to air traditional commercial advertising. These changes were officially approved by the CRTC on November 2, 2016.

=== Cable/satellite packaging ===
Under CRTC regulations as of March 2016, the lowest tier of service of a digital broadcast distribution undertaking must include:

- all national CRTC-licensed networks, specifically CBC Television, Ici Radio-Canada Télé, TVA and APTN;
- all local or regional broadcasters, usually including stations/affiliates of CTV and Global, and (where applicable) Citytv, CTV Two, Noovo, and provincial educational broadcasters such as TVOntario, Télé-Québec, or Knowledge Network (B.C.). Satellite providers carry most but not all local stations, and, unlike their U.S. equivalents, out-of-market stations may be carried nationally.
- A local channel broadcasting the proceedings of the provincial legislature (if one exists).
- All undertakings that are subject to 9(1)(h) orders. This designation is used sparingly by the CRTC, and is reserved specifically for services that show an "exceptional contribution" to Canada's broadcasting system. Some of these services only have must-carry status in English or French-speaking markets, and can be carried on a discretionary basis in predominantly French or English markets respectively. However, the majority are mandatory nationwide regardless of language. Examples of these services include:
  - The Aboriginal Peoples Television Network, a broadcaster serving Canada's First Nations communities.
  - AMI-tv and AMI-télé, which provide accessible programming with audio descriptions in English and French.
  - The radio reading service AMI-audio in anglophone markets, or Canal M in francophone markets.
  - CPAC, which broadcasts parliamentary sessions and committee meetings, along with some political public affairs programming.
  - Omni Regional, a specialty service relaying Omni Television stations serving ethnic communities.
  - The Weather Network in anglophone markets and MétéoMédia in francophone markets.
  - The French-language networks TV5 Québec Canada and Unis in Anglophone markets.
- Ici RDI in anglophone markets, and CBC News Network in francophone markets.
- Cable providers are also required to carry at least one CBC Radio station in each language, as well as any local campus, community or native radio stations. The requirement to carry all stations was removed by the CRTC in 2006. At the same time the commission stated that this requirement did not, and would not, force cable companies to provide these stations via cable FM receivers, provided they were available as channels on the digital service.

The basic package described above must be sold at a maximum rate of $25 per-month.

A higher-tiered basic package typically adds:

- Common basic cable specialty channels, such as news channels (including Canadian networks, and U.S. services such as CNN), Much, and YTV among others.
- A community channel, featuring locally produced public affairs and information programming, and coverage of other local events.
- American broadcast network affiliates. These are carried under a "4 + 1" rule, meaning that a cable company may offer stations affiliated with any four American commercial networks and PBS on a basic tier. In most markets, the five networks provided are ABC, CBS, NBC, Fox and PBS, although in many markets Fox is carried on a modified dual-status rather than a basic tier. Affiliates of The CW can only be offered on a discretionary tier; generally, they are offered through the packaging of American superstations, such as KTLA, WSBK-TV, and WPIX-TV (along with independent superstation WGN-TV, which left The CW in 2016, and WSBK-TV, which departed American programming service MyNetworkTV in the fall of 2022), with pay television services. However, cable providers in border markets within the broadcast range of a major American television market, such as Windsor, may be granted an exemption to the 4 + 1 rule to improve the marketability of their service (for example, Cogeco Cable systems in Windsor carry Detroit's CW affiliate WMYD and independent station WKBD-TV, which until 2023 had been affiliated with MyNetworkTV and The CW respectively). The only superstation available to Canadians offering access to MyNetworkTV is currently WWOR-TV, which is mainly carried only in a limited capacity in the Atlantic provinces and Quebec.
- Timeshift channels, including east and west coast feeds of certain specialty channels, and Canadian/U.S. network affiliates from cities in different time zones (such as markets in the Eastern Time Zone and Pacific Time Zone).
- "exempt" services such as The Shopping Channel, program guides, and real estate/classifieds channels.
- A digital radio service, offering local radio stations, and the national specialty radio service Stingray Music.

Other "discretionary tiers" or packages include other Canadian specialty or premium services and foreign services, as noted above. The distribution of these services is covered by various regulations, including one that states that a package cannot consist exclusively of foreign services and must maintain a certain ratio of Canadian to foreign services. Additionally, if the service provider is the owner of a channel, the service must offer three channels owned by third-parties for each co-owned channel they carry.

On March 19, 2015, the CRTC announced new policies on the packaging of television services. Since March 2016, all television services have been required to offer a basic service ("skinny basic") consisting of all local Canadian broadcast television channels, local legislative and educational services, and all specialty services that have 9(1)(h) must-carry status, costing a maximum of $25 per-month. The tier may optionally include U.S. network affiliates. Since December 1, 2016, all television providers are required to allow subscribers to purchase channels on an individual (a la carte) basis.

== See also ==
- List of television stations in Canada by call sign
- List of Canadian television networks (table)
- List of Canadian television channels
- List of foreign television channels available in Canada
- List of United States stations available in Canada
- Digital television in Canada
- List of Canadian stations available in the United States
- List of television stations in North America by media market
