= List of United States television stations available in Canada =

This article lists all of the local over-the-air television stations in the United States that are carried in Canada via cable/digital cable or satellite. This list also includes stations that were formerly carried, but have since been dropped. Some of the stations listed also have their over-the-air signal overlapping major cities in Canada; a few are also available over-the-air only in Canada.

The stations are organized by market, starting in the east (Maine) and ending in the west (California). Not all stations are available in all areas. A station that has the word "bumped" next to it means that the station has been replaced by one of the stations from the CANCOM services, most likely either a Buffalo or Detroit local station in the east, or a Spokane or Seattle local station in the west.

== American over-the-air services distributed locally ==
These channels appear on certain cable systems in Canada. However, the CRTC has not authorized their distribution outside of the areas in which these channels can be picked up over-the-air; hence, they are not available for national distribution. There are other American stations available in Canada near the American border, but they are only available over-the-air and are not carried on any cable system.

- FOX:
  - WJBK Detroit (available in Windsor/Sarnia/Chatham-Kent; available on Cogeco cable in Windsor area)
  - KMSP-TV Minneapolis (available in Thunder Bay)
  - WAGM-DT2 Presque Isle (available in Northwestern New Brunswick)
  - WFXT-TV Boston (serves most of Atlantic Canada by Cable and fiber providers)
- CBS:
  - WAGM-TV Presque Isle (available in Northwestern New Brunswick)
  - WCCO-TV Minneapolis (available in Thunder Bay)
  - WBZ-TV Boston (serves most of Atlantic Canada by Cable and fiber providers)
- ABC:
  - WDAZ-TV Grand Forks (available in Winnipeg)
  - KSTP-TV Minneapolis (available in Thunder Bay)
  - KOMO-TV Seattle (available in British Columbia and Atlantic Canada)
  - WCVB-TV Boston (available in Atlantic Canada)
- The CW:
  - WNLO Buffalo (available in Southern Ontario)
  - WKBD-TV Detroit (available in Windsor/Sarnia/Chatham-Kent)
  - WUAB Cleveland (available in London)
  - WPIX New York (available in Atlantic Canada)
- Univision:
  - KVOS-TV Bellingham (available in Vancouver/Southern British Columbia and Vancouver Island)
- MyNetworkTV:
  - WNYO-TV Buffalo (available in Southern Ontario)
- PBS:
  - WMED-TV (available in New Brunswick)
  - KFME-TV Fargo (available in Winnipeg/Northwestern Ontario in high-definition)
  - KGFE-TV Grand Forks (available in Winnipeg)
  - KTCI Minneapolis (available in Thunder Bay)
  - WCFE-TV Plattsburgh (available in Montreal)
  - WPBS-TV Watertown (available in Ottawa)
  - WNED-TV Buffalo (available in Southern Ontario)
  - WQLN-TV Erie (available in London)
- Independent:
  - WMYD Detroit (available in Windsor/Sarnia/Chatham-Kent)
  - KSTW Tacoma (available in Vancouver/Southern British Columbia and Vancouver Island)
- NBC
  - WWPI-LD Fort Kent (Available in Northern New Brunswick)
  - WBTS-CD Boston (Available in Atlantic Canada)

== Superstations ==
These stations are listed as superstations, and are carried on many if not most or all cable and satellite systems in Canada.

- KTLA Los Angeles
- KWGN-TV Denver
- WGN-TV Chicago
- WPCH-TV Atlanta
- WPIX New York City
- WSBK-TV Boston
- WWOR-TV New York City

== Shaw Broadcast Services / nationwide coverage ==
Seattle and Detroit stations are carried via Shaw Broadcast Services, and are available nationwide to Shaw Direct customers and domestic cable TV operators, as well as to some Northern United States communities.

Shaw had announced its intention to drop all Buffalo feeds and coverage of Detroit Fox O&O WJBK, which was effective by the end of April 2009.

Market/city	Call sign	Affiliation	Available?	Notes
Rochester, New York	WUHF	Fox	Yes	Replaced WJBK FOX Detroit
Buffalo, New York	WIVB-TV	CBS	Dropped	
Buffalo, New York	WKBW-TV	ABC	Dropped	
Buffalo, New York	WGRZ	NBC	Dropped	
Buffalo, New York	WUTV	Fox	Dropped	
Buffalo, New York	WNED-TV	PBS	Yes	
Detroit, Michigan	WWJ-TV	CBS	Yes	
Detroit, Michigan	WXYZ-TV	ABC	Yes	
Detroit, Michigan	WDIV-TV	NBC	Yes	
Detroit, Michigan	WJBK	Fox	Dropped	Replaced by WUHF FOX Rochester
Detroit, Michigan	WTVS	PBS	Yes	
Spokane, Washington	KREM	CBS	Yes	
Spokane, Washington	KXLY-TV	ABC	Yes	
Spokane, Washington	KHQ-TV	NBC	Yes	
Spokane, Washington	KAYU-TV	Fox	Yes	
Spokane, Washington	KSPS-TV	PBS	Yes	
Seattle, Washington	KIRO-TV	CBS	Yes	
Seattle, Washington	KOMO-TV	ABC	Yes	
Seattle, Washington	KCTS-TV	PBS	Yes	
Seattle, Washington	KING-TV	NBC	Yes	
Tacoma, Washington	KCPQ	Fox	Yes	
Atlanta, Georgia	WPCH-TV	The CW	Yes	WPCH-TV is a Superstation.
Chicago, Illinois	WGN-TV	The CW	Yes	WGN-TV is a Superstation.
Boston, Massachusetts	WSBK-TV	Independent	Yes	WSBK-TV is a Superstation.
New York, New York	WPIX	The CW	Yes	WPIX is a Superstation.
Los Angeles, California	KTLA	The CW	Yes	KTLA is a Superstation.

== Bell TV / nationwide coverage ==
Bell Satellite TV carries Boston and Seattle local stations nationally.

Bell carries many Seattle related television stations.

Market/city	Call sign	Affiliation	Available?	Notes
Boston, Massachusetts	WBTS-CD	NBC	Yes	
Boston, Massachusetts	WBZ-TV	CBS	Yes	
Boston, Massachusetts	WCVB-TV	ABC	Yes	
Boston, Massachusetts	WHDH	NBC	Dropped	Dropped by Bell when WHDH became an independent station in 2017.
Boston, Massachusetts	WFXT	Fox	Yes	
Boston, Massachusetts	WGBH	PBS	Yes	
Seattle, Washington	KIRO-TV	CBS	Yes	
Seattle, Washington	KOMO-TV	ABC	Yes	
Seattle, Washington	KING-TV	NBC	Yes	
Tacoma, Washington	KCPQ	Fox	Yes	
Seattle, Washington	KCTS-TV	PBS	Yes	
Atlanta, Georgia	WPCH-TV	The CW	Yes	
Chicago, Illinois	WGN-TV	The CW	Yes	WGN-TV had been dropped at one point, but is on their cable system nationally as of 2017.
Boston, Massachusetts	WSBK-TV	Independent	Yes	
New York, New York	WPIX	The CW	Yes	
Los Angeles, California	KTLA	The CW	Yes	

== Other stations / local coverage ==
These other stations are not carried nationally, and may only be available in a certain region or even a few towns. Some stations are available over-the-air only.

=== Eastern Canada ===
These stations are carried in the Atlantic Canadian provinces of New Brunswick, Prince Edward Island, Nova Scotia, and Newfoundland and Labrador, across many cable systems.

US Market/city	Canadian areas covered	Call sign	Affiliation	Available?	Notes
Fort Kent/Presque Isle, ME	Edmunston/Woodstock, NB	WWPI-LD	NBC	No	
Presque Isle, ME	Edmunston/Woodstock, NB	WAGM-TV	CBS	Dropped	Bumped
Presque Isle, ME	Edmunston/Woodstock, NB	WMEM-TV	PBS	Yes	
Bangor, ME	Fredericton/Saint John, NB	WABI-TV	CBS	Dropped	Bumped
Bangor, ME	New Brunswick	WVII-TV	ABC	Dropped	Bumped
Bangor, Maine	New Brunswick	WLBZ	NBC	Dropped	Bumped in favour of CANCOM's distribution of WDIV-TV in Newfoundland in 1985 and WHDH-TV in the Maritimes after the 1996 Summer Olympics
Bangor, Maine	New Brunswick	WFVX-LD	Fox	No	
Bangor, Maine	New Brunswick	WMEB-TV	PBS	No	
Portland, Maine	New Brunswick and Sherbrooke/Estrie, QC	WMTW	ABC	Dropped	Bumped
Portland, Maine	Sherbrooke, Quebec, and Atlantic Canada	WCBB	PBS	Dropped and replaced by Bell Aliant in favor of WNED Buffalo in 2026	MPBN
Boston, Massachusetts	Maritime Provinces	WBTS-CD	NBC	Yes	Carried on Rogers Cable and Bell
Boston, Massachusetts	Maritime Provinces	WBZ-TV	CBS	Yes	Carried on Rogers Cable and Bell
Boston, Massachusetts	Maritime Provinces	WCVB-TV	ABC	Yes	Carried on Rogers Cable and Bell
Boston, Massachusetts	Maritime Provinces	WHDH	NBC	Dropped	Bumped in favor of WBTS-LD, due to WHDH becoming independent
Boston, Massachusetts	Maritime Provinces	WFXT	Fox	Yes	
Boston, Massachusetts	Maritime Provinces	WGBH-TV	PBS	Yes	WGBH had also operated a satellite uplink of all Boston locals on behalf of Bell Satellite TV. Carried by Eastlink
Boston, Massachusetts	Maritime Provinces	WGBX-TV	PBS	No	
Detroit, Michigan		WTVS	PBS		Carried on Rogers Cable
Burlington, Vermont	Southern Quebec	WFFF-TV	FOX		Also Carried on cable in Prince Edward Island, Quebec, Nova Scotia, and Newfoundland and Labrador via VMedia
Burlington, Vermont	Southern Quebec/Montreal Region	WVNY	ABC		Also Carried on cable in Prince Edward Island, Quebec, Nova Scotia, and Newfoundland and Labrador via VMedia
Burlington, Vermont	Southern Quebec/Montreal	WPTZ	NBC		Also Carried on cable in Prince Edward Island, Quebec, Nova Scotia, and Newfoundland and Labrador via VMedia
Burlington, Vermont	Southern Quebec / Montreal	WCAX-TV	CBS		Also Carried on cable in Prince Edward Island, Quebec, Nova Scotia, and Newfoundland and Labrador via VMedia
Burlington, Vermont	Southern Quebec / Montreal	WETK	PBS		Also Carried on cable in Prince Edward Island, Quebec, Nova Scotia, and Newfoundland and Labrador via VMedia
Buffalo, New York	Maritime Provinces and Newfoundland	WNYO	MyNetworkTV		Also Carried on cable in Prince Edward Island, Quebec, Nova Scotia, and Newfoundland and Labrador via VMedia
Buffalo, New York	Maritime Provinces and Newfoundland	WNED-TV	PBS	Replaced MPBN the PBS station for the state of Maine and Carried on Bell	Also Carried on cable in Prince Edward Island, Quebec, Nova Scotia, and Newfoundland and Labrador via VMedia
Boston, Massachusetts	Maritime Provinces and region-wide	WSBK-TV	Independent		
Atlanta, Georgia	Region-wide	WPCH-TV	The CW	Carried as Approved Superstation by CRTC	

=== Province of Quebec, Cornwall/Hawkesbury Ontario ===
These stations are available to cable and satellite customers in Quebec City, Sherbrooke, and Montreal.

Market/city	Call sign	Affiliation	Available?	Notes
Burlington/Plattsburgh	WCAX-TV	CBS	Yes	Carried on cable in Montreal and Quebec City
Burlington/Plattsburgh	WVNY	ABC	Yes	Carried on cable in Montreal and Quebec City
Burlington/Plattsburgh	WPTZ-TV	NBC	Yes	Carried on cable in Montreal and Quebec City
Burlington/Plattsburgh	WFFF-TV	Fox	Yes	Carried on cable in Montreal and Quebec City (FOX only)
Burlington/Plattsburgh	WETK-TV	PBS	Yes	Carried on cable in Montreal
Burlington/Plattsburgh	WCFE-TV	PBS	Yes	Carried on cable in Montreal and Quebec City
Burlington/Plattsburgh	WWBI-LP	ION	Dropped	Dropped at CRTC's requests; station ceased operations in 2007
Rochester, New York	WUHF	Fox	Dropped	First FOX affiliate to be shown on cable in Montreal. Replaced with WUTV-TV FOX Buffalo.
Buffalo, New York	WUTV	Fox	Dropped	Second FOX affiliate to be shown on cable in Montreal. Replaced with WFFF-TV when it first came on air.
Seattle, Washington	KOMO-TV	ABC	Yes	Carried on cable via Vidéotron
Seattle, Washington	KING-TV	NBC	Yes	Carried on cable via Vidéotron
Seattle, Washington	KIRO-TV	CBS	Yes	Carried on cable via Vidéotron
Seattle, Washington	KCPQ	FOX	Yes	Carried on cable via Vidéotron
Boston, Massachusetts	WSBK-TV	Independent		Carried on cable in Quebec via VMedia
Atlanta, Georgia	WPCH-TV	The CW		Carried on cable in Quebec via VMedia

=== Eastern Ontario ===
These stations are or were carried in the National Capital Region, Pembroke, Ontario, Ottawa, and Kingston, Ontario. This region also includes Peterborough, Ontario, and towns along the northern shore of Lake Ontario.

Market/city	Call sign	Affiliation	Available?	Notes
Watertown, New York	WWNY-TV	CBS	Yes	Carried in Kingston-Brockville, where it is easily available over-the-air. Was formerly carried in Ottawa, dropped due to signal quality issues from distance. WNYF/Fox 7.2 digital subchannel OTA-only; Watertown digital subchannels are not on cable and not listed in Kingston local TV listings.
Watertown, New York	WWTI-TV	ABC	Yes	Carried in Kingston; The CW Plus WWTI 50.2 digital subchannel available over-the-air only/not in local TV listings.
Watertown, New York	WNYF-CD	Fox	No	Low-power HDTV signal only available with full-size rooftop antenna, but a standard-definition WWNY-DT2 digital subchannel provides solid A-grade coverage over-the-air in Kingston, Ontario. More-distant Syracuse and (later) Buffalo signals are distributed by Kingston's Cogeco cable system instead of the more local Watertown affiliate.
Watertown, New York	WPBS-TV	PBS	Yes	Carried in Ottawa and Pembroke (via WNPI-TV), Kingston directly (as WPBS-TV). Digital subchannels (Create/ThinkBright, PBS-HD) not carried by cable operators but readily available over-the-air in Kingston.
Syracuse, New York	WTVH	CBS	dropped	Was carried in Kingston; had been bumped to higher cable converter channels in favour of WWNY-TV, before being dropped altogether after the United States' digital transition.
Syracuse, New York	WSYR-TV	ABC	dropped	Was carried in Kingston; had been bumped to higher cable converter channels in favour of commonly owned WWTI-TV, which now occupies the "cable 9" position. Station was dropped altogether after the digital transition, like WTVH, above.
Syracuse, New York	WSTM-TV	NBC	dropped	Was carried in Kingston; OTA signal was fringe analogue reception, main channel only. Syracuse locals were dropped in favour of Buffalo NY after 2009's digital transition.
Syracuse, New York	WSYT	Fox	dropped	Was carried in Kingston, although over-the-air availability is weak to limited compared to WWNY-DT2. Despite the ready availability of a Watertown-based Fox TV affiliate, the Syracuse locals were dropped in favour of Buffalo NY after 2009's digital transition.
Syracuse, New York	WCNY-TV	PBS	No	Intermittently viewable over-the-air in the Kingston-Watertown, New York market but notable by its absence from cable systems, which instead carry WPBS-TV (for Kingston and Ottawa) or WTVS-TV PBS Detroit (for Brockville, Ontario).
Rochester, New York	WROC-TV	CBS	Yes	Carried on cable systems in Belleville, Cobourg, and along the northern shore of Lake Ontario. Bumped from Ottawa-area cable systems.
Rochester, New York	WHAM-TV	ABC	Yes	Carried on cable systems in Belleville, Cobourg, and along the northern shore of Lake Ontario. Bumped from Ottawa-area cable systems.
Rochester, New York	WHEC-TV	NBC	Yes	Carried on cable systems in Belleville, Cobourg, and along the northern shore of Lake Ontario. Bumped from Ottawa-area cable systems.
Rochester, New York	WUHF	Fox	Yes	Carried on cable systems in Belleville, Cobourg, and along the northern shore of Lake Ontario. Bumped from Ottawa-area cable systems.
Rochester, New York	WXXI-TV	PBS	Yes	Carried on cable systems in Belleville, Cobourg, and along the northern shore of Lake Ontario. Was never available on cable in the Ottawa area, due to WPBS-TV.
Buffalo, New York	WNYO-TV	MyNet	Yes	Carried on cable systems in Brockville and Cornwall, as well as much of Southern Ontario.
Buffalo, New York	WUTV	FOX		Carried by Cogeco in Belleville, Kingston, Peterborough, and St. Catharines
Buffalo, New York	WGRZ	NBC		Carried by Cogeco in Belleville, Kingston, Hamilton, Peterborough, and St. Catharines
Buffalo, New York	WNED-TV	PBS		Carried by Cogeco in Belleville, Hamilton, Peterborough, and St. Catharines and Bell in Atlantic Canada
Buffalo, New York	WKBW-TV	ABC		Carried by Cogeco in Belleville, Kingston, Hamilton, and St. Catharines
Watertown, New York	WPBS-TV	PBS		Carried by Cogeco in Belleville, and Kingston
New York, New York	WPIX	The CW		Carried by most cable providers as a superstation
Atlanta, Georgia	WPCH-TV	The CW		Carried by VMedia

=== Southern Ontario (SWO) ===
These stations are carried throughout the Greater Toronto Area, the Golden Triangle (Guelph, Kitchener/Waterloo, Cambridge) and Golden Horseshoe on a variety of cable systems. Channel locales are generally determined by carriers in SWO. As an example, Bell Fibe offers U.S. national-networks (i.e., ABC, CBS, NBC, etc.) from Detroit, MI. Whereas Rogers Cable systems in the same viewing area will distribute Buffalo New York national-networks. Although cable companies vary by viewing area, Bell Fibe is generally available across all of SWO, as is Rogers Cable Systems in many of the same areas.

Market/city	Call sign	Affiliation	Available?	Notes
Rochester, New York	WUHF	Fox	Yes	Carried on cable systems in Belleville, Ontario and along the northern shore of Lake Ontario
Buffalo, New York	WIVB-TV	CBS	Yes	
Buffalo, New York	WKBW-TV	ABC	Yes	
Buffalo, New York	WGRZ	NBC	Yes	
Buffalo, New York	WUTV	Fox	Yes	
Buffalo, New York	WNED-TV	PBS	Yes	
Buffalo, New York	WNLO	The CW	Yes	
Buffalo, New York	WNYO-TV	MyNet	Yes	Carried on cable systems in Brockville and Cornwall, as well as much of Southern Ontario.

=== London, Ontario ===
These stations are carried in the London and St. Thomas area.

Market/city	Call sign	Affiliation	Available?	Notes
Buffalo, New York	WIVB-TV	CBS	No	
Buffalo, New York	WKBW-TV	ABC	No	
Buffalo, New York	WGRZ	NBC	No	
Buffalo, New York	WUTV	Fox	No	
Buffalo, New York	WNED-TV	PBS	Yes	Carried in London on digital cable television
Buffalo, New York	WNLO	The CW	Yes	Carried in London on digital cable television
Buffalo, New York	WNYO-TV	MyNet	Yes	Carried in London on digital cable television
Erie, Pennsylvania	WSEE-TV	CBS	Dropped	Dropped in the London area sometime in the 1980s
Erie, Pennsylvania	WJET-TV	ABC	Dropped	Dropped in London on August 18, 2009
Erie, Pennsylvania	WICU-TV	NBC	Dropped	Dropped in London on August 18, 2009
Erie, Pennsylvania	WFXP	Fox	No	
Erie, Pennsylvania	WQLN	PBS	Yes	Carried in London
Cleveland, Ohio	WOIO	CBS	Dropped	Dropped in the 2010s (St. Thomas), briefly available in London on digital cable in 2006
Cleveland, Ohio	WEWS-TV	ABC	Dropped	Replaced with WJET in 1969 (Northern London) and 1977 (southern London)
Cleveland, Ohio	WKYC	NBC	Dropped	Dropped in 1974, replaced with CIII-DT Toronto when it launched
Cleveland, Ohio	WJW	Fox	Dropped	Dropped in the 1970s
Cleveland, Ohio	WVIZ	PBS	No	
Cleveland, Ohio	WUAB	MyNet	Yes	Carried in London
Detroit, Michigan	WWJ-TV	CBS	Yes	Carried in London
Detroit, Michigan	WXYZ-TV	ABC	Yes	Carried in London
Detroit, Michigan	WDIV-TV	NBC	Yes	Carried in London
Detroit, Michigan	WJBK-TV	Fox	Yes	Carried in London
Detroit, Michigan	WTVS	PBS	Yes	Carried in London

=== Windsor, Ontario/Chatham, Ontario ===
These stations are or were carried in the Windsor, Ontario market, serving Windsor, Essex County, Leamington, Ontario, Chatham-Kent, Ontario, Lambton County and even parts of Middlesex County and Elgin County. Also refer to CRTC decisions archive for details on the Windsor/Leamington-area cable listings.

Market/city	Call sign	Affiliation	Available?	Notes
Cleveland, Ohio	WOIO	CBS	Dropped	Listed in local Windsor TV Guides until 1999. May be carried in Chatham-Kent, at Cogeco (local cable operator)'s choice. Carried in St. Thomas, and was briefly available to London-area viewers on digital cable television. Dropped in late 2010s
Cleveland, Ohio	WEWS-TV	ABC	Dropped	Bumped from Shaw Cable when Cogeco took over in 2000. Available to southern Essex County only. May be carried in Chatham-Kent, at Cogeco (local cable operator)'s choice. Bumped on October 17, 2009, from local TV Guides and replaced with WXYZ-DT 7.2.
Cleveland, Ohio	WKYC	NBC	Dropped	Bumped from Shaw Cable when Cogeco took over in 2000. Available to southern Essex County only. Bumped on October 17, 2009, from local TV Guides and replaced with WDIV-DT 4.2.
Cleveland, Ohio	WJW	Fox	Dropped	Bumped from Shaw Cable when Cogeco took over in 2000. Available to southern Essex County only. May be carried in Leamington and Chatham-Kent, at Cogeco (local cable operator)'s choice. Bumped on October 17, 2009, from local TV Guides and replaced with WTOL-DT 11.2.
Cleveland, Ohio	WVIZ	PBS	No	
Cleveland, Ohio	WUAB	MyNet	Yes	Still carried in London, Ontario, only Cleveland local still listed in Windsor-area TV Guides.
Toledo, Ohio	WTOL	CBS	Partial	Listed in local Windsor TV Guides, reception is fair to poor in downtown Windsor, dropped in early 2009 as part of the Digital Transition in the United States.
Toledo, Ohio	WTOL-DT 11.2	MeTV	Partial	Added to Windsor-area TV Guides on October 17, 2009, replaces WJW from Cleveland. Dropped from listings in August of 2011
Toledo, Ohio	WTVG	ABC	Partial	Listed in local Windsor TV Guides, reception is fair to poor in downtown Windsor, dropped in early 2009 as part of the Digital Transition in the United States.
Toledo, Ohio	WNWO-TV	NBC	Dropped	Cogeco dropped this station in Windsor to make room for Canadian Learning Television. No longer listed in local Windsor TV Guides. May be carried in Leamington, at Cogeco (local cable operator)'s choice.
Toledo, Ohio	WUPW	Fox	No	Formerly listed in local Windsor TV Guides
Toledo, Ohio	WTVG-DT 13.2	The CW	Partial	Added to Windsor-area TV Guides on October 17, 2009, replaces WNWO-TV
Toledo, Ohio	WGTE-TV	PBS	Dropped	No longer listed in local Windsor TV Guides, reception is fair to poor in downtown Windsor. May be carried in Leamington, at Cogeco (local cable operator)'s choice, dropped in Windsor and Leamington in the late 1980s. Replaced with WTVS-DT2
Detroit, Michigan	WWJ-TV	CBS	Yes	
Detroit, Michigan	WXYZ-TV	ABC	Yes	
Detroit, Michigan	WDIV-TV	NBC	Yes	
Detroit, Michigan	WJBK	Fox	Yes	
Detroit, Michigan	WTVS	PBS	Yes	
Detroit, Michigan	WTVS-DT 56.2	PBS (alternate programming)	Partial	Added to TV Guides on October 17, 2009 (replaces WGTE-TV), not available on cable
Detroit, Michigan	WKBD-TV	The CW	Yes	Carried in Windsor and area, not nationally carried otherwise
Detroit, Michigan	WMYD	Independent	Yes	Carried in Windsor and area, not nationally carried otherwise
Detroit, Michigan	WDIV-DT 4.2	This TV	Partial	Added on October 17, 2009 (replaces WKYC), not available on cable
Detroit, Michigan	WXYZ-DT 7.2	Retro TV	Partial	Added on October 17, 2009 (replaces WEWS), not available on cable
Detroit, Michigan	WUDT-LD	Daystar	No	Not listed in local Windsor TV Guides, signal is fair in downtown Windsor.
Mount Clemens, Michigan	WADL	MyNet	Unknown	Not carried in Windsor or Essex County, probably still carried in other parts of Southwestern Ontario, listed in TV Guides
Mount Clemens, Michigan	WADL-DT2	Antenna TV	Partial	Added to TV Guides on October 17, 2009 (replaces WNWO-TV), not available on cable
Lansing, Michigan	WLNS-TV	CBS	No	Listed in local Windsor TV Guides until 1993
Lansing, Michigan	WILX-TV	NBC	No	Listed in local Windsor TV Guides until 1993, alongside CFPL-DT, London's channel 10

=== Northeastern Ontario ===
These stations are or were carried in Northern Ontario, including Sault Ste. Marie, Ontario.

Market/city	Call sign	Affiliation	Available?	Notes
Rochester, New York	WOKR-TV	ABC	Bumped	Sudbury/North Bay/Timmins; bumped for WXYZ Detroit
Rochester, New York	WUHF-TV	Fox	Yes	
Buffalo, New York	WIVB-TV	CBS	Dropped	Bumped for WWTV Traverse City
Buffalo, New York	WKBW-TV	ABC	No	
Buffalo, New York	WGRZ	NBC	Dropped	Bumped for WDIV Detroit
Buffalo, New York	WUTV	Fox	No	
Buffalo, New York	WNED-TV	PBS	Yes	Sudbury/North Bay/Timmins only
Detroit, Michigan	WWJ-TV	CBS	Yes	
Detroit, Michigan	WXYZ-TV	ABC	Yes	
Detroit, Michigan	WDIV-TV	NBC	Yes	
Detroit, Michigan	WJBK	Fox	No	
Detroit, Michigan	WTVS	PBS	Yes	Except Sudbury/North Bay/Timmins
Flint, Michigan	WJRT-TV	ABC	Dropped	Sault Ste. Marie, ON only; bumped for WXYZ Detroit
Marquette, Michigan	WNMU	PBS	Dropped	Sault Ste. Marie only; bumped for WTVS Detroit
Marquette, Michigan	WLUC	NBC	Dropped	Only seen along Lake Superior shoreline; bumped for WDIV Detroit
Alpena, Michigan	WCML	PBS	Dropped	Not carried in Sault Ste. Marie; bumped for WNED-TV Buffalo (Sudbury/North Bay/Timmins) or WTVS Detroit (elsewhere)
Sault Ste. Marie, Michigan	WWTV/WWUP	CBS	Dropped	Bumped for WWJ Detroit
Sault Ste. Marie, Michigan	WGTQ	ABC	Dropped	Bumped for WJRT Flint (Sault Ste. Marie only) or WXYZ Detroit (elsewhere)
Sault Ste. Marie, Michigan	WTOM	NBC	Dropped	Sault Ste. Marie, ON only; bumped for WDIV Detroit
Cadillac/Traverse City, Michigan	WWUP	Fox	No	
Mount Pleasant, Michigan	WCMU-TV	PBS	No	

=== Northwestern Ontario, Manitoba and Saskatchewan ===
These stations are carried throughout cities and towns in Northwestern Ontario, Manitoba, and in Saskatchewan.

Market/city	Call sign	Affiliation	Available?	Cable provider
Minneapolis-St. Paul, Minnesota	WCCO-TV	CBS	Yes	Shaw Cable, MTS TV, Westman TV
Minneapolis-St. Paul, Minnesota	KSTP-TV	ABC	Yes	
Minneapolis-St. Paul, Minnesota	KARE	NBC	Yes	Shaw Cable, MTS TV
Minneapolis-St. Paul, Minnesota	KMSP-TV	Fox	Yes	MTS TV
Minneapolis-St. Paul, Minnesota	KTCA	PBS	No	
Minneapolis-St. Paul, Minnesota	KTCI	PBS	Yes	Northwest Ontario, except Kenora
Minneapolis-St. Paul, Minnesota	WFTC	MyNet	Dropped	Bumped for KMSP-TV after Fox/UPN switch in 2002.
Pembina, North Dakota	KNRR	Fox	No	Available over-the-air in Winnipeg, but denied cable carriage by the CRTC shortly after station's 1986 sign-on due to station's intent to sustain itself on Canadian revenues through a Winnipeg sales office. Satellite of KVRR in Fargo, also denied Canadian carriage in 1994 in favor of WUHF Rochester, New York.
Pembina, North Dakota	KCND-TV	ABC	Station closed	"Border station" serving Winnipeg, 1960-1975 (on cable from 1968). Non-license assets acquired by Canadian interests and station formally moved to Winnipeg as CKND-TV.
Williston, North Dakota	KUMV	NBC	Dropped	Bumped for KARE or WDIV
Williston, North Dakota	KXMD	CBS	Dropped	Bumped for WCCO or WWJ
Grand Forks, North Dakota	KGFE	PBS	Yes	PPTV source signal through digital conversion, now relays Minnesota Channel, carried by Westman TV
Grand Forks, North Dakota	WDAZ-TV	ABC	Yes	8.1 ABC only; Shaw Cable, MTS TV
Grand Forks, North Dakota	KBRR	Fox	No	
Grand Forks, North Dakota	KCGE	PBS	Yes*	PPTV replaced KGFE with KCGE. Only 16.1 carried. Station signal otherwise identical to KFME.
Grand Forks, North Dakota	KCPM	MyNet	No	
Fargo, North Dakota	KXJB-TV	CBS	Dropped	Bumped for WCCO or WWJ
Fargo, North Dakota	WDAY-TV	ABC	No	
Fargo, North Dakota	KVLY-TV	NBC	Dropped	Bumped for KARE or WDIV
Fargo, North Dakota	KFME	PBS	Yes	13.1 PPTV Only, Manitoba and Kenora; Shaw Cable, MTS TV
Fargo, North Dakota	KVRR	Fox	No	
Great Falls, Montana	KFBB-TV	ABC	Dropped	Bumped for WDAZ or WXYZ
Rochester, New York	WUHF	Fox	Yes	Shaw Cable, Westman TV
Spokane, Washington	KXLY-TV	ABC	Yes	Shaw Cable
Spokane, Washington	KREM	CBS	Yes	Shaw Cable
Spokane, Washington	KAYU-TV	Fox	Yes	Shaw Cable
Spokane, Washington	KHQ-TV	NBC	Yes	Shaw Cable
Seattle, Washington	KOMO-TV	ABC	Yes	MTS TV
Seattle, Washington	KIRO-TV	CBS	Yes	MTS TV
Seattle, Washington	KCPQ	Fox	Yes	MTS TV
Seattle, Washington	KING-TV	NBC	Yes	MTS TV
Seattle, Washington	KCTS-TV	PBS	Yes	MTS TV
Detroit, Michigan	WTVS	PBS	Yes	Shaw Cable, MTS TV
Detroit, Michigan	WXYZ-TV	ABC	Yes	Westman TV, Access Communications
Detroit, Michigan	WWJ-TV	CBS	Yes	Access Communications
Detroit, Michigan	WDIV-TV	NBC		Access Communications
Detroit, Michigan	WTVS	PBS		Access Communications
Rochester, New York	WUHF	FOX		Access Communications
New York, New York	WPIX	The CW		
Chicago, Illinois	WGN-TV	The CW		
Boston, Massachusetts	WSBK-TV	Independent		
Los Angeles, California	KTLA	The CW		VMedia
Atlanta, Georgia	WPCH-TV	The CW		VMedia

=== Edmonton Capital Region/Calgary Region of Alberta ===
Market/city	Call sign	Affiliation	Available?	Notes
Spokane, Washington	KREM	CBS	Yes	
Spokane, Washington	KXLY-TV	ABC	Yes	
Spokane, Washington	KHQ-TV	NBC	Yes	
Spokane, Washington	KAYU-TV	Fox	Yes	
Spokane, Washington	KSPS-TV	PBS	Yes	Carried on cable via Shaw Cable and Telus TV
Seattle, Washington	KOMO-TV	ABC	Yes	Carried on cable via Telus TV
Seattle, Washington	KIRO-TV	CBS	Yes	Carried on cable via Telus TV
Seattle, Washington	KCPQ	Fox	Yes	Carried on cable via Telus TV
Seattle, Washington	KING-TV	NBC	Yes	Carried on cable via Telus TV
Boston, Massachusetts	WCVB-TV	ABC		Carried on cable via Telus TV
Boston, Massachusetts	WBTS-CD	NBC		Carried on cable via Telus TV
Boston, Massachusetts	WSBK-TV	Independent		Carried on cable via Telus TV
Boston, Massachusetts	WGBH-TV	PBS		Carried on cable via Telus TV
Boston, Massachusetts	WBZ-TV	CBS		Carried on cable via Telus TV
Boston, Massachusetts	WFXT	FOX		Carried on cable via Telus TV
New York, New York	WPIX	The CW		Carried on cable via Telus TV
Chicago, Illinois	WGN-TV	The CW		Carried on cable via Telus TV
Atlanta, Georgia	WPCH-TV	The CW		Carried on cable via Telus TV
Secaucus, New Jersey	WWOR-TV	MyNetworkTV		Carried on cable via Telus TV
Los Angeles, California	KTLA	The CW		Carried on cable via Telus TV

=== Yukon, Northwest Territories, and Nunavut ===
These stations are carried throughout cities in Yukon, Northwest Territories, and Nunavut

Market/city	Call sign	Affiliation	Available?	Notes
Seattle, Washington	KIRO-TV	CBS	Yes	Carried on cable via Northwestel
Seattle, Washington	KOMO-TV	ABC	Yes	Carried on cable via Northwestel
Seattle, Washington	KCTS-TV	PBS	Yes	Carried on cable via Northwestel
Seattle, Washington	KING-TV	NBC	Yes	Carried on cable via Northwestel
Tacoma, Washington	KCPQ	Fox	Yes	Carried on cable via Northwestel
New York, New York	WPIX	The CW	Yes	Carried on cable via Northwestel
Boston, Massachusetts	WSBK-TV	Independent	Yes	Carried on cable via Northwestel
Atlanta, Georgia	WPCH-TV	The CW	Yes	Carried on cable via Northwestel
Los Angeles, California	KTLA-TV	The CW	Yes	Carried on cable via Northwestel
Chicago, Illinois	WGN-TV	The CW	Yes	Carried on cable via Northwestel
Detroit, Michigan	WWJ-TV	CBS	Yes	Carried on cable via Northwestel
Detroit, Michigan	WXYZ-TV	ABC	Yes	Carried on cable via Northwestel
Detroit, Michigan	WDIV-TV	NBC	Yes	Carried on cable via Northwestel
Detroit, Michigan	WJBK	FOX	Yes	Carried on cable via Northwestel
Detroit, Michigan	WTVS	PBS	Yes	Carried on cable via Northwestel

=== Lower Mainland/Vancouver Island of British Columbia ===
These stations are carried throughout the Lower Mainland of British Columbia, including Vancouver, Victoria, and the Lower Fraser Valley.

Market/city	Call sign	Affiliation	Available?	Notes
Bellingham, Washington	KBCB	SBN	No	Digital over-the-air signal is available in the Lower Mainland.
Tacoma, Washington	KBTC-TV	PBS	No	Digital over-the-air signal is available in the Lower Mainland from a local repeater.
Seattle, Washington	KCTS-TV	PBS	Yes	Available over-the-air and on cable via Novus
Tacoma, Washington	KCPQ	Fox	Yes	Available over-the-air and on cable via Novus
Seattle, Washington	KIRO-TV	CBS	Yes	Available over-the-air and on cable via Novus
Seattle, Washington	KOMO-TV	ABC	Yes	Available over-the-air and on cable via Novus
Seattle, Washington	KING-TV	NBC	Yes	Available over-the-air and on cable via Novus
Tacoma, Washington	KSTW	Independent	Yes	Available over-the-air and on cable via Novus
Bellingham, Washington	KVOS-TV	Univision	Yes	Digital over-the-air signal is available in the lower mainland. MeTV is available via cable, but its subchannels are not.
New York, New York	WPIX	The CW		Carried on cable via Telus TV and Novus
Secaucus, New Jersey	WWOR-TV	MyNetworkTV		Carried on cable via Telus TV
Atlanta, Georgia	WPCH-TV	The CW		Carried on cable via Telus TV and Novus
Chicago, Illinois	WGN-TV	The CW		Carried on cable via Telus TV and Novus
Los Angeles, California	KTLA	The CW		Carried on cable via Telus TV and Novus
Boston, Massachusetts	WCVB-TV	ABC		Carried on cable via Telus TV
Boston, Massachusetts	WBZ-TV	CBS		Carried on cable via Telus TV
Boston, Massachusetts	WGBH-TV	PBS		Carried on cable via Telus TV
Boston, Massachusetts	WBTS-CD	NBC		Carried on cable via Telus TV
Boston, Massachusetts	WFXT	FOX		Carried on cable via Telus TV
Boston, Massachusetts	WSBK-TV	Independent		Carried on cable via Novus
Detroit, Michigan	WXYZ-TV	ABC		Carried on cable via Novus
Detroit, Michigan	WTVS	PBS		Carried on cable via Novus
Detroit, Michigan	WJBK	FOX		Carried on cable via Novus
Detroit, Michigan	WDIV-TV	NBC		Carried on cable via Novus
Detroit, Michigan	WWJ-TV	CBS		Carried on cable via Novus

== See also ==
- List of television stations in Canada
- List of Canadian television networks
- List of Canadian television channels
- List of Canadian specialty channels
- Category A services
- Category B services
- Category C services
- List of foreign television channels available in Canada
- Digital television in Canada
- Multichannel television in Canada
- List of Canadian television stations available in the United States
- List of television stations in North America by media market
