= List of Canadian television networks =

Canada has adopted the NTSC and ATSC television transmission standards without any alterations. However, some unique local variations exist for DTH television because of transponder design variation in the Anik series of satellites. Television in Canada has many individual stations and networks and systems.

== Networks list ==
All of the networks listed below operate a number of terrestrial TV stations. In addition, several of these networks are also aired on cable and satellite services.

=== English-language networks ===
Logo	Television network	Founded	Type of network	Number of owned and operated stations	Number of private affiliates
	CBC Television	1952 (Note: Although the Canadian Broadcasting Corporation was founded in 1932, it did not begin television transmissions until 1952.)	Public	14	None
	CTV	1961	Commercial	22	2
	CTV 2	1995 (Note: CKVR-DT, a former CBC affiliate, becomes an independent station in 1995.)	Commercial	7 OTA + 2 cable-only	3
	Global	1974	Commercial	15	3
	Citytv	1972 (Note: CITY-TV launched in 1972. CKVU-TV adopted the moniker in 2002, and the former Craig Media stations also adopted the Citytv moniker when they were bought in 2005.)	Commercial	6 OTA + 1 cable-only	3
	Yes TV	1998	Commercial	3	3

=== French-language networks ===
Logo	Television network	founded	Type of network	Number of owned and operated stations	Number of private affiliates
	Ici Radio-Canada Télé	1952	Public	13	2
	TVA	1971	Commercial	6	4
	Noovo	1986	Commercial	5	4

=== Educational networks ===
Television network	Founded	Type of network	Language	Number of owned and operated stations	Number of private affiliates
TVO	1970	Public	English	1	None
Knowledge Network	1981	Public	English	Cable only	None
Télé-Québec	1975	Public	French/sometimes English	1	None
Canal Savoir	1986	Public	French	1	None
TFO	1987	Public	French	Cable only	None

=== Multicultural networks ===
Television system	Founded	Type of system	Language	Number of owned and operated stations	Number of private affiliates
APTN	1992	Public, multicultural	Aboriginal, English, French	2	None
Omni Television	1979 (Note: CFMT-TV launched in 1979. CJMT-TV launched in 2002. CHNU-TV (NOW TV) was bought in 2005, and CIIT-TV was purchased before it went on the air, in February 2006.)	Commercial, multicultural	Multilingual	5	1

=== Independent networks ===
- CHCH
- NTV
- CHEK
- Joytv
- FaithTV
- Miracle Channel

=== Defunct television systems ===
A-Channel (merged into Citytv)
BBS
E!

== See also ==
- List of television stations in Canada by call sign
- List of Canadian television channels
- List of Canadian specialty channels
- Category A services
- Category B services
- Category C services
- List of foreign television channels available in Canada
- List of United States stations available in Canada
- Digital television in Canada
- Multichannel television in Canada
- List of Canadian stations available in the United States
- List of television stations in North America by media market
