= Pardon C =

- Also known as: Pardon C
- Born: Obinna Okoro; Imo State, Nigeria
- Origin: Imo State, Nigeria
- Genres: Afro pop music, Highlife
- Occupations: Singer-songwriter, Cinematographer, Entrepreneur
- Years active: 2009–present
- Label: TCO Music
- Website: pardonc.com

Pardon C (born Obinna Okoro; November 15) is a United States-based Nigerian singer-songwriter and an entrepreneur currently signed to TCO Music.

== Career ==
In 2009 he released Ukwu Ruo Ala, since then he has released several Highlife singles that also includes international collaborations. The singer kept honing his skills to master his own act, by following it up with another single, Chain Dem. After a year, he dropped another single entitled Romeo in 2015.

As an artist representing his home country Nigeria in the diaspora, the singer has graced the stage with music greats like 2face Idibia, Uganda's Jose Chameleone and singers like Flavour N'abania, Bracket, Olamide, Wizkid, Davido, Psquare and some others.

In 2016 the T.C.O Music recording artist, licensed all his musical works to theMedia 360 Company Limited, the company which helped him in distributing his musical works and in the same year he released yet another single Emergency after a brief hiatus, the song was aired on local radio stations in Nigeria, Internet Radio in UK and United States and talked about on online Entertainment Magazine's. After few months he followed it up with Gbabe.

The highlife singer left the scene in 2016 and returned in 2017 with an international collaboration Bele Bele, the song talks about the beauty of an African Woman and he featured Legendary Ugandan artiste, Jose Chameleone on it. The song has had it own controversy surrounding it despite having an A-List artist on the song, according to local media Naij the online news magazine reports that the Ugandan singer refused to show the usual supports as expected of him. Pardon C was also featured on Cameroonian singer-songwriter / rapper, Naomi Achu's new single Shower Your Blessings a pseudo "Queen of Bamenda."

Pardon C is the brand Ambassador of N'Square Boutique and the brother of Beauty Entrepreneur Thelma Okoro, ONYC Hair Founder. In 2017, the singer won the award for "Best Music Video" at the annual Next Generation Awards.

In June 2025, Pardon C featured on “My Body,” a single by Nigerian-American artist Lexxani Azure, which debuted at number 13 on the Apple Music Nigeria Hip‑Hop chart and number 150 on the Afrobeat chart. The track was produced by Stunna Beat and accompanied by a music video filmed in Nigeria.

=== Singles ===
- 2006: "We Don Suffer"
- 2009: "Ukwu Ruo Ala"
- 2015: "Chain Dem"
- 2015: "Beauty Wahala"
- 2015: "Wereya Easy"
- 2015: "Igbo Nwere Mmadu"
- 2015: "Romeo"
- 2015: "Komabo Feat Slowdog"
- 2016: "Emergency"
- 2016: "Gbabe"
- 2016: "Double Money Feat Kellyhansome"
- 2017: "Bele Bele" Feat. Jose Chameleone
- 2017: "Eyes Don See"
- 2018: "Mama"
- 2018: "Brain Box"
- 2019: "Fire Lady"
- 2019: "ije love"
- 2019: "One Africa"
- 2019: "Gimme Body"
- 2020: "Giver"
- 2020: "Jeje Feat Teddy A"
- 2021: "Falling"
- 2021: "Roll IT"
- 2022: "Benzima"
- 2022: "Answer"
- 2022: "Ayeh"
- 2021: "Ajebutter"
- 2021: "Camavinga"
- 2023: "Gbona"
- 2024: "EWEDU"
- 2024: "Dalyboy Feat Pardon C Body Talk"
- 2025: "Lexxani Azure Feat Pardon C My Body"
- 2025: "Pardon C Komando"
- 2026: "Pardon C Monika"(Acoustic Version)

== Awards and nominations ==
Year	Award	Category	Result
2016	Diaspora Entertainment Awards	Best Male Act	Won
2017	Next Generation Awards	Best Music Video "Emergency"	Won
2017	Best Song	"Bele Bele" (Ft. J.Chameleone)	Nominated
2017	Hollywood and African Prestiges Awards	Best Male Act	Nominated
2017	Hollywood and African Prestiges Awards	Best Male Act	Nominated
2018	Uollywood Awards	Best Music Video "Emergency"	Won
2019	AFRIFAMU Awards	Best Male Diaspora	Won
