= Gone Viral TV =

Gone Viral TV HD
- Type: Cable television channel
- Country: Barbados
- Availability: Aruba, Bahamas, Barbados, Bermuda, Canada, Colombia, Costa Rica, Curaçao, Guatemala, Honduras, Jamaica, Mexico, Panama, Philippines, Saint Lucia, St. Maarten, Saint Vincent, Venezuela, Europe, Asia, United States
- TV transmitters: SES-1 Satellite in C-Band
- Broadcast area: Worldwide
- Launch date: June 2011
- Affiliates: Gulfcom Inc.
- Official website: www.goneviraltv.com

Gone Viral TV (also known as GVTV) is a High Definition Pay-TV channel based out of Barbados and distributed exclusively by Gulfcom Inc. Servicing Pay-TV operators in the Caribbean, North America, Latin America, Europe and Asia. GVTV broadcasts popular Internet-based content, which has previously aired on YouTube, Vimeo and other online networks. GVTV started broadcasting from the SES Satellite to Pay-TV Operators across the America’s in June 2011.

In 2012, three Gone Viral Network Pay-TV channels were launched, which included Gone Viral Music, Gone Viral Vogue and Vamos Viral TV (Spanish). Gone Viral X-treme was launched December, 2014.

Gone Viral TV was ranked as one of the 11 best things at the 2015 Internet and Television Expo (INTX) in Chicago. Tosh.0, Ridiculousness, The QYOU and Maker TV are other examples of shows airing made-for-web videos on Television.

== History ==
October 2011, Gone Viral TV was added to the list of foreign television channels available in Canada.

Dec. 1, 2011 LIME (Cable & Wireless) Saint Lucia launched GVTV in their basic cable package on channel 27.

Logic One Jamaica added the Gone Viral Network in November, 2012.

August, 2013 REV TV Cable Bahamas included GVTV in their Prime Ultimate package as channel 285.

Multi-Choice TV (Barbados) added the Gone Viral Network in November, 2013.

Source Cable part of Rogers Communications Canada launched GVTV in their digital basic package channel 99, in November 2013.

Flow St. Lucia and St. Vincent added the Gone Viral Network in July, 2014.

G4 on December 31, 2014 was taken off air and St. Maarten Cable replaced it with GVTV in their Solid Gold package on channel 284.

In October 2015, the over-the-top worldwide streaming service FilmOn added the entire Gone Viral Network of channels to their paid subscription tier.

Cable Color Honduras, the first Central American company to transmit cable television through a fiber optic network in Honduras, in March 2016 started broadcasting the Gone Viral Network.

May 2017, in Dominican Republic both CABLE ATLANTICO and ORBIT CABLE launched the Gone Viral Network.

Advanced Info Service (AIS) Thailand's largest mobile operator adds the Gone Viral Network onto their mobile and television platforms, as of April, 2017.

== Content ==
Network programming consists of High Definition, back-to-back, made-for-web, short-form videos of varying genres. Showcasing the most popular ‘viral’ Internet videos from around the world in a 24/7 linear, commercial-free format.
