= List of Canadian television stations available in the United States =

This article lists all of the stations in Canada that are viewable in parts of the United States.

Media market	Call sign	Origin	Affiliation	Available on cable?	Notes
Presque Isle, Maine	CBAT-DT	Fredericton	CBC	Yes	
Presque Isle, Maine	CBAFT-DT	Moncton	SRC	Yes	
Presque Isle, Maine	CIMT-DT	Rivière-du-Loup	TVA	Yes	
Bangor, Maine	CBMT-DT	Montreal	CBC	Yes	
Augusta, Maine	CKSH-DT	Sherbrooke	SRC	Yes	Channel 2 on Charter Spectrum in Augusta; not carried in Portland
Augusta, Maine	CHLT-DT	Sherbrooke	TVA	Yes	Channel 16 on Charter Spectrum in Augusta; not carried in Portland
Boston, Massachusetts	CKSH-DT	Sherbrooke	SRC	Yes	
Burlington, Vermont	CBFT-DT	Montreal	SRC	Yes	
Burlington, Vermont	CBMT-DT	Montreal	CBC	Yes	
Burlington, Vermont	CBOT-DT	Ottawa	CBC	Yes	Not available on all systems; most carry CBMT instead
Burlington, Vermont	CFCF-DT	Montreal	CTV	Yes	
Burlington, Vermont	CJOH-DT	Ottawa	CTV	Yes	Carried via CJSS-TV, now CJOH broadcast translator "CJOH-8"
Watertown, New York	CBOT-DT	Ottawa	CBC	Partial	Carried in Ogdensburg, Potsdam and Massena due to their relative proximity to Ottawa-Hull; not carried in Watertown itself. Massena is also served by CBMT; additional Montréal locals are available OTA in Massena but are not carried on cable.
Watertown, New York	CBMT-DT	Montreal	CBC	Partial	Carried in Massena due to that town's proximity to Montreal; not carried in other cities in the Watertown market.
Watertown, New York	CJOH-DT	Ottawa	CTV	Yes	Carried via CJOH broadcast translator "CJOH-6" Deseronto in Carthage, carried directly in Ogdensburg and Potsdam due to these communities' proximity to Ottawa-Hull. CJOH-TV-8 Cornwall is carried in nearby Massena, where it provides the sole full-power city-grade OTA service.
Watertown, New York	CICO-DT	Toronto	TVOntario	No	Available OTA from Kingston UHF 38 rebroadcaster in much of Jefferson County but not carried by local US cable systems.
Watertown, New York	CBLFT-DT	Toronto	SRC	No	Once carried OTA from Kingston UHF 32 rebroadcaster in much of Jefferson County but not carried by local US cable systems. Due to budget cuts from the CBC, the rebroadcaster went off the air as of July 31, 2012
Watertown, New York	CKWS-TV	Kingston	Global	Yes	Transmitter is located on the border between Kingston, Ontario-Cape Vincent, New York, therefore city-grade to much of Jefferson County. Carried by Charter Spectrum in Carthage, Watertown and Ogdensburg.
Utica-Rome, New York	CKWS-TV	Kingston	Global	Yes	Station is unavailable OTA in Utica (co-channel interference with MyTV's WPNY-LD 11) but remains on some cable systems in Utica-Rome.
Buffalo, New York	CBLT-DT	Toronto	CBC	Yes	
Buffalo, New York	CFTO-DT	Toronto	CTV	Yes	
Buffalo, New York	CHCH-DT	Hamilton	Independent	Yes	
Buffalo, New York	CIII-DT-41	Toronto	Global	Listed in some local TV guides	Available over-the-air via Ontario-wide repeater chain, closest Niagara-region repeater is now CN Tower in Toronto
Buffalo, New York	CITY-DT	Toronto	City	Yes	Not available on all systems; not available in immediate Buffalo area
Erie, Pennsylvania	CFPL-DT	London	CTV 2	No	Carried over-the-air
Erie, Pennsylvania	CBLT-DT	Toronto	CBC	No	Once carried over-the-air via its London repeater CBLN, however, due to Budget cuts, it went off the air as of July 31, 2012
Erie, Pennsylvania	CITY-DT	Toronto	City	No	Carried over-the-air via its Woodstock repeater CITY-TV-2
Cleveland, Ohio	CBET-DT	Windsor	CBC	Dropped	Was listed in local Cleveland and area TV guides until the early 1990s
Toledo, Ohio	CBET-DT	Windsor	CBC	Yes	Still carried on Buckeye Broadband, dropped by Time Warner Cable (now Charter Spectrum) in Findlay, Ohio and elsewhere
Detroit, Michigan	CBET-DT	Windsor	CBC	Yes	Carried across much of southern Michigan, from Detroit and Monroe to Flint and Lansing
Detroit, Michigan	CICO-DT	Toronto	TVOntario	Yes	Carried on cable via Comcast in Royal Oak and Troy, in TV guide listings throughout Metro area. Also available over the air in most cities in Metro Detroit.
Detroit, Michigan	CKCO-DT	Kitchener	CTV	Listed in local Detroit TV guides	CKCO-TV-3 ch. 42 transmitter from Oil Springs/Sarnia
Detroit, Michigan	CIII-DT-22	Paris-Toronto	Global	Listed in local Detroit TV guides	Stevenson/Wheatley-area transmitter
Detroit, Michigan	CBEFT	Windsor	SRC	No	CBEFT formerly an originating station on UHF 78, and later channel 54, that was listed in TV guides in metro Detroit. Station moved to analog channel 35 in 2011, but was decommissioned by CBC and went off the air in July, 2012.
Port Huron, Michigan	CIII-DT-22 / CIII-DT-29	Paris-Toronto	Global	Yes	Stevenson (ch. 22) and Oil Springs (ch. 29) transmitters
Sanilac County, Michigan	CFPL-DT	London	CTV 2	Yes	
Bay City-Midland, Michigan	CBMT-DT	Montreal	CBC	Yes	Not carried in Flint/Saginaw areas, which have CBET instead
Alpena, Michigan	CBMT-DT	Montreal	CBC	Yes	
Sault Ste. Marie, Michigan	CJIC-TV	Sault Ste. Marie	CBC	No	Eastern Upper Peninsula only, later CBLT-TV-5, shut down on July 31, 2012 due to budget cuts. Replaced on EUP cable systems by CBMT.
Sault Ste. Marie, Michigan	CHBX-TV	Sault Ste. Marie	CTV	Partial	Eastern Upper Peninsula
Marquette, Michigan	CKPR-DT	Thunder Bay	CBC	Partial	Keweenaw Peninsula systems only
Bemidji, Minnesota	CBWT-DT	Winnipeg	CBC	Yes	
International Falls, Minnesota	CBWT-DT	Winnipeg	CBC	No	
Duluth, Minnesota	CBMT-DT	Montreal	CBC	Partial	Not available on all systems; not available in the immediate Duluth area
Duluth, Minnesota	CKPR-DT	Thunder Bay	CTV	Partial	Not available on all systems; not available in the immediate Duluth area
Grand Forks, North Dakota	CBWT-DT	Winnipeg	CBC	Yes	
Grand Forks, North Dakota	CKY-DT	Winnipeg	CTV	Partial	Available mainly on systems close to the border; not available in the immediate Grand Forks area
Minot, North Dakota	CKCK-DT	Regina	CTV	Partial	Available mainly on systems close to the border
Minot, North Dakota	CBKT-DT	Regina	CBC	Partial	Available mainly on systems close to the border; carried via CKOS-TV, now CBKT broadcast translator "CBKT-6"
Great Falls, Montana	CISA-DT	Lethbridge	Global	Partial	Not available on all systems; not available in the immediate Great Falls area; station has a few repeaters in Montana, owned by local interests
Great Falls, Montana	CFCN-DT	Calgary	CTV	Partial	Not available on all systems; not available in the immediate Great Falls area
Missoula, Montana	CISA-DT	Lethbridge	Global	Yes	
Seattle, Washington	CBUT-DT	Vancouver	CBC	Yes	
Seattle, Washington	CHAN-DT	Vancouver	Global	Partial	Not available on all systems; not available in the immediate Seattle area
Seattle, Washington	CHEK-DT	Victoria	Independent	Partial	Not available on all systems; not available in the immediate Seattle area
Seattle, Washington	CIVT-DT	Vancouver	CTV	Partial	Not available on all systems; not available in the immediate Seattle area

== See also ==
- List of television stations in Canada by call sign
- List of Canadian television networks (table)
- List of Canadian television channels
- List of Canadian specialty channels
- Category A services
- Category B services
- Category C services
- List of foreign television channels available in Canada
- List of United States television stations available in Canada
- Digital television in Canada
- Multichannel television in Canada
- List of television stations in North America by media market
