= List of foreign television channels available in Canada =

This is a list of foreign television channels available in Canada. The Canadian Radio-television and Telecommunications Commission (CRTC) regulates which television channels are allowed to air in Canada. Although the vast majority of television channels available in Canada are Canadian-owned and operated, the CRTC allows certain foreign-owned channels to be broadcast in Canada.

In order for a non-Canadian station/channel to broadcast in Canada it must first be listed by the CRTC on the List of non-Canadian programming services authorized for distribution. Cable and satellite companies are only allowed to carry the foreign services that are contained in the list. Also, not every channel on the list is currently carried by broadcast distribution undertakings (BDUs), it is up to their discretion to decide what channels they are interested in offering to consumers.

On June 30, 2011, the CRTC introduced new policy whereby the 'lists of eligible satellite services' would be consolidated into one list to be known as the 'List of non-Canadian programming services authorized for distribution'.

== List of non-Canadian programming services authorized for distribution ==
Although the CRTC has combined all stations/channels together, the list below has been separated into sections to distinguish between the various types of services that are contained in the list. Up to one channel from each network can be carried by a Class 1, 2, or 3 pay television provider that cannot receive an acceptable signal from that network. The CRTC has authorized most subscription companies to carry a second American network feed from another time zone on a discretionary basis. Affiliations are as listed by the CRTC.

Call sign	Media market	Network affiliation	Notes
WCVB-TV	Boston	ABC	
WKBW-TV	Buffalo	ABC	
WVNY	Burlington	ABC	
WXYZ-TV	Detroit	ABC	
WJET-TV	Erie	ABC	
KSTP-TV	Minneapolis	ABC	
KOMO-TV	Seattle–Tacoma	ABC	
KXLY-TV	Spokane	ABC	
WBZ-TV	Boston	CBS	
WIVB-TV	Buffalo	CBS	
WCAX-TV	Burlington	CBS	
WWJ-TV	Detroit	CBS	
WSEE-TV	Erie	CBS	
WCCO-TV	Minneapolis	CBS	
KIRO-TV	Seattle–Tacoma	CBS	
KREM	Spokane	CBS	
WTOL	Toledo	CBS	
WFXT	Boston	Fox	
WUTV	Buffalo	Fox	
WFFF-TV	Burlington	Fox	
WJBK	Detroit	Fox	
WFTC	Minneapolis	Fox	(Note: WFTC swapped its primary affiliation with co-owned KMSP-TV in September 2002, becoming a UPN affiliate and later a MyNetworkTV owned-and-operated station; at some point thereafter, select TV providers in Manitoba and northwestern Ontario began carrying KMSP. In 2014, Fox began simulcasting the two stations' main channels over both stations. Throughout this time, the CRTC listing identifying WFTC as the Minneapolis Fox affiliate has remained unchanged.)
WUHF	Rochester	Fox	
KCPQ	Seattle–Tacoma	Fox	
KAYU-TV	Spokane	Fox	
WBTS-CD	Boston	NBC	(Note: WBTS-CD (then WBTS-LD) was authorized for distribution by the CRTC on December 20, 2016, and replaced WHDH as the NBC affiliate on January 1, 2017. The authorization later transferred to the former WYCN-LD, which transmits a full-power signal to the Boston area using a channel share with WGBX-TV.)
WGRZ	Buffalo	NBC	
WPTZ	Burlington	NBC	
WDIV-TV	Detroit	NBC	
WICU-TV	Erie	NBC	
KARE	Minneapolis	NBC	
KING-TV	Seattle–Tacoma	NBC	
KHQ-TV	Spokane	NBC	
WGBH-TV	Boston	PBS	
WNED-TV	Buffalo	PBS	
WETK	Burlington	PBS	
WTVS	Detroit	PBS	
WQLN	Erie	PBS	
KCTS-TV	Seattle–Tacoma	PBS	
KSPS-TV	Spokane	PBS	
WHDH	Boston	Independent	(Note: WHDH was removed from most cable providers in favour of WBTS-CD on January 1, 2017, but still remains authorized for distribution.)

American superstations eligible for national distribution
Call sign	Media market	Network affiliation
KSTW	Seattle–Tacoma	Independent
KTLA	Los Angeles	The CW
KWGN-TV	Denver	The CW
WGN-TV	Chicago	The CW
WPCH-TV	Atlanta	The CW
WPIX	New York City	The CW
WSBK-TV	Boston	Independent
WUAB	Cleveland	Independent with MyNetworkTV
WWOR-TV	New York City	Independent with MyNetworkTV

=== Foreign specialty channels ===
All channels listed are authorized for distribution, with those in boldface type domestically available through cable, satellite, or IPTV services. However, some may not be carried by a provider due to lack of a carriage contract, low overall viewer interest, programming or rights conflicts with a domestic network, or other technical concerns. Some channels below or not listed here may also distribute their services through IPTV means direct to the consumer without CRTC intervention, and/or have no geoblocking restrictions for Canadian viewers to access their network streams.

- **1+1 International** (Ukraine)
- 4K Heritage (United States)
- 1Music (Nigeria)
- **2M Maroc** (Morocco)
- 2sTV (Senegal)
- **4E TV** (Greece)
- **5 Kanal** (Ukraine)
- A3 (Algeria)
- A+ Kids (United Kingdom)
- **Aaj Tak** (India), a Canadian version is already on-air
- AAJ News (Pakistan)
- AAJ TV (Pakistan)
- **Aapka Colors** (India)
- Aastha Bhajan (India)
- **A Bola TV** (Portugal)
- **A&E** (United States)
- **ABP News** (India)
- ABO (United States)
- **Africa 24** (France)
- Afro Sports (United States)
- Afrotainment (United States)
- Afrotainment Music (United States)
- AksyonTV International (Philippines)
- **Al Arabiya** (UAE)
- Al Araby (United Kingdom)
- Al Jadeed (Lebanon) (formerly New Sat)
- Al Jazeera (Qatar)
- **Al Jazeera English** (Qatar)
- **Alpha Sat** (Greece)
- **AMC** (United States), separate feed for Canada is broadcast
- **ANC** (Philippines)
- **American Heroes Channel** (United States) (formerly Military Channel)
- **Antena 3 Internacional** (Spain)
- Ariana Television (Afghanistan)
- **ART America** (Egypt)
- ART Movies (Egypt)
- **ATN News** (Bangladesh)
- ATV Home Channel (Hong Kong)
- **ARY Musik** (Pakistan)
- **ARY News** (Pakistan)
- **ARY Qtv** (Pakistan)
- **ARY Zauq** (Pakistan)
- Asianet Plus (India)
- **AWE** (United States)
- **AXS TV** (United States) (formerly HDNet)
- **Az Mundo** (Mexico)
- **BabyFirstTV** (United States)
- **BabyTV** (UK)
- **Band Internacional** (Brazil)
- **Band News** (Brazil)
- Banglavision (Bangladesh)
- **BBC News** (UK) (BBC World North America feed)
- **Beijing TV** (China)
- **beIN Sports en Español** (United States)
- **Benfica TV** (Portugal)
- Berbère Télévision (France)
- **Bestseller** (Russia)
- **BET** (United States)
- **Big Ten Network** (United States)
- **Bloomberg Television** (United States)
- Bridges TV (United States)
- Business Plus (Pakistan)
- BVN (Netherlands and Flanders)
- C Music (England)
- C-SPAN (United States)
- C4 (New Zealand) (formerly TV4)
- Cameroon Radio Television (CRTV) (Cameroon)
- Canal+ International (France) **(No longer exists)**
- Canal 2 International (Cameroon)
- Canal 24 Horas (Spain)
- Canal 52 MX (Mexico)
- Canal Algérie (Algeria)
- **Canal de las Estrellas Latinoamérica** (Mexico)
- Canal Q (Portugal)
- **Canal SUR** (United States)
- **Caracol TV Internacional** (Colombia)
- **CaribVision** (Barbados)
- **CBS Sports Network** (United States, certain programming is blacked out)
- **CCTV-4** (China)
- **CCTV Entertainment** (China)
- **CGTN** (China) (formerly CCTV News)
- **CGTN Documentary** (China) (formerly CCTV-9)
- **CGTN French** (China) (formerly CCTV Français)
- **CEEN TV** (Jamaica)
- Centroamerica TV (United States)
- Channel [V] (Taiwan)
- **Channel i** (Bangladesh)
- Channel One (Bangladesh) **(No longer exists)**
- **Channel One** (Russia)
- Charming China (China)
- **China Yellow River TV** (China)
- CincoMas (Spain)
- **Cine Bangla** (United States)
- **CineLatino** (Mexico)
- **Cinema One Global** (Philippines)
- **CNBC** (United States)
- **CNN** (United States)
- **CNN International** (United States)
- Comedy Central (United States)
- Cubavision Internacional (Cuba)
- Dandana TV (United States)
- Dawn News (Pakistan)
- De Película (Mexico)
- **Dragon TV** (China)
- **Duck TV** (Slovakia)
- Duna World (Hungary)
- DW (Deutsche+) (Germany) **(No longer exists)**
- **DW English** (Germany)
- EbonyLife TV (Nigeria)
- Ekushey TV (Bangladesh)
- El Gourmet.com TV (Argentina)
- **English Club TV** (United Kingdom)
- Esperanza TV (United States)
- **ET Now** (India)
- ETTV Global (China)
- ETV Bangla (India)
- Eurochannel (France)
- **Euronews** (France)
- Eurosport News (France)
- **EWTN** (United States)
- FashionBox (USA)
- FastnfunBox (Poland)
- Filmbox Arthouse (Poland)
- **Fox Business Network** (United States)
- Fox Life (Argentina) (formerly Utilisima)
- **Fox News Channel** (United States)
- **Fox Sports Racing** (United States) (formerly Speed)
- **France 24** - Arabic (France)
- **France 24** - English (France)
- **France 24** - French (France)
- **Fujian Straits TV (SETV)** (China)
- FunboxUHD (USA)
- **Future Television** (Lebanon)
- **GAC Living** (United States) (formerly Ride TV)
- **Game Show Network** (United States)
- Gametoon Box (Poland)
- **Geo TV** (Pakistan)
- **German Kino Plus** (United States)
- **GMA Life TV** (Philippines)
- **GMA News TV International** (Philippines)
- **GMA Pinoy TV** (Philippines)
- **Golf Channel** (United States)
- Gone Viral Music (Barbados)
- Gone Viral TV (Barbados)
- Gone Viral Vogue (Barbados)
- Gone Viral X-treme (Barbados)
- **Greek Cinema** (Greece)
- Great Wall Elite (China)
- **India Today** (India)
- **Haiti HD** (United States)
- HIGH TV 3D (United States)
- **HLN** (United States)
- **Hope Channel** (United States)
- Horizon Channel (Hong Kong)
- HTV (United States)
- HuffPost Live (United States)
- **Hunan Satellite TV** (China)
- i24NEWS (Israel)
- iROKO Play (Nigeria)
- iROKO Plus (Nigeria)
- Indus Vision (Pakistan)
- **iTVN** (Poland)
- **Jewelry Television** (United States)
- **Jewish Life Television** (United States)
- **Jiangsu International TV** (China)
- JUS 24x7 (United States)
- JUS ONE (United States)
- JUS Punjabi (United States)
- JUS TV (United States)
- K TV (India)
- **Kapatid Channel International** (Philippines)
- Kino Polska International (Poland)
- Kino Polska Muzyka International (Poland)
- KTO (France)
- La7 (Italy)
- LBC America (Lebanon)
- Lifestyle Network (Philippines) **(No longer exists)**
- Lifetime Television (United States), a Canadian version is already on-air
- LUXE.TV (Luxembourg)
- **M6 International** (France)
- **Masala TV** (Pakistan)
- MBC Drama (South Korea)
- Medi 1 TV (Morocco)
- Melody (France)
- Mello TV (Jamaica)
- **Mexicanal** (United States)
- **Mezzo** (France)
- **MGG TV** (France) (formerly ES1)
- Milenio Television (Mexico)
- Mirror Now (India)
- **MLB Network** (United States)
- Motors TV North AM (United Kingdom)
- **MSNBC** (United States)
- **Museum** (France)
- **Mult** (Russia)
- Multimedios Televisión (Mexico)
- MTA International (United Kingdom)
- MUTV (United Kingdom)
- **myZen.tv** (France)
- **NASA TV** (United States)
- Nautical Channel (UK)
- **NDTV 24x7** (India)
- **NDTV Good Times** (India)
- NDTV India (India)
- NDTV Profit (India)
- Network Ten (Australia)
- **NetViet** (Vietnam)
- **NFL Network** (United States)
- **NHK World TV** (Japan)
- NTD TV (United States), a Canadian version is already on-air
- **Nippon TV** (Japan)
- Now BNC (Hong Kong)
- Now Entertainment Channel (Hong Kong)
- **NTN24** (Colombia)
- **NTV Bangla** (Bangladesh)
- **One America News Network** (United States)
- **One Caribbean Television** (United States)
- OUI TV (United States)
- Oxygen (United States)
- Pac-12 Network (United States)
- Paramount Network (United States)
- Paris Première (France)
- Peace TV (United Arab Emirates)
- **PeopleTV** (United States)
- PFC Internacional (Brazil)
- **Phoenix North America Chinese Channel** (United States)
- **Phoenix InfoNews Channel** (United States)
- **Planète+** (France), separate feed for Canada is broadcast
- Planète+ Thalassa (France)
- **Playboy TV** (United States)
- Polsat 2 International (Poland)
- ProSiebenSat.1 Welt (Germany) **(No longer exists)**
- **PTV Global** (Pakistan)
- **Punjab TV** (Pakistan)
- QVC (United States)
- Radiodiffusion Télévision Ivoirienne (RTI) (Ivory Coast)
- Radio Télévision Guinéenne (RTG) (Guinea)
- Radio Télévision du Sénégal (RTS) (Senegal)
- Radio-Télévision nationale congolaise (RTNC) (Congo)
- **Rai Italia** (Italy)
- **Rai News24** (Italy)
- **Rai World Premium** (Italy)
- **RCN Nuestra Tele** (Colombia)
- **Record Internacional** (Brazil)
- Revel TV 4K (France)
- REVOLT (United States)
- **RIK Sat** (Cyprus)
- **Ritmoson Latino** (Mexico)
- RTL International (Germany) **(No longer exists)**
- RTP3 (Portugal)
- RTP Açores Internacional (Portugal)
- **RTP Internacional** (Portugal)
- **RTR Planeta** (Russia)
- RTV (Bangladesh)
- RTV Palma (Serbia) **(No longer exists)**
- **Sahara One** (India)
- Sahara Samay (India)
- **Saint Pierre & Miquelon 1ère** (France)
- **Seasons** (France)
- SET Asia (India), a **Canadian version** is already on-air
- Shalom World (United States)
- **SIC Notícias** (Portugal)
- **Sky News Arabia** (United Arab Emirates)
- **Sky News International** (United Kingdom)
- **Southern Television Guangdong** (TVS Satellite) (China)
- **Sport Plus** (Greece)
- STAR Chinese Channel (Taiwan)
- STAR Chinese Movies 2 (Taiwan)
- STAR Gold (India), a **Canadian version** is already on-air
- **Star International** (Greece)
- **Star Plus** (India)
- Star Suvarna (India) (formerly Asianet Suvarna)
- Star TVE HD (Spain)
- **Stingray Classica** (Netherlands)
- Stingray Djazz (Netherlands)
- Stingray Festival 4K (Netherlands)
- **Studio Canal** (France)
- Sun TV (India)
- Super Canale Caribe (Dominican Republic)
- **Telefe Internacional** (Argentina)
- Televisión Dominicana (United States)
- **The Africa Channel** (United States)
- **The Filipino Channel** (Philippines)
- The Silent Network (Kaleidoscope) (United States) **(No longer exists)**
- The Weather Channel (United States)
- **TL Novelas** (Mexico)
- **TLC** (United States)
- **TNT** (Russia)
- Trace TV (France)
- **Travelxp** 4K (India)
- **TRT World** (Turkey)
- TruTV (United States)
- **Turner Classic Movies** (United States), separate feed for Canada is broadcast
- TV3 (Ireland)
- TV3 (New Zealand)
- **TV Asia** (United States)
- **TV Chile** (Chile)
- TV Land (United States)
- TV Naija (United States)
- **TV Globo Internacional** (Brazil)
- **TV Japan** (United States)
- TV Polonia (Poland)
- **TVE Internacional** (Spain)
- TVI 24 (Portugal)
- TVI Ficção (Portugal)
- **TVI Internacional** (Portugal)
- TVRi (Romania)
- Ukraine24 (Ukraine)
- UTV Movies International (India)
- WAPA America (United States)
- WMNB-TV: Russian-American Broadcasting Company (United States)
- **WWE Network** (United States)
- Zaiqa TV (Pakistan)
- Zhejiang International (China)

== See also ==
- List of television stations in Canada by call sign
- List of Canadian television networks (table)
- List of Canadian television channels
- List of Canadian specialty channels
- Discretionary service
- List of United States television stations available in Canada
- Digital television in Canada
- Multichannel television in Canada
- List of Canadian television stations available in the United States
- List of television stations in North America by media market
