= Digital television in Canada =

Digital terrestrial television in Canada (often shortened to DTT) is transmitted using the ATSC standard. Because Canada and the U.S. use the same standard and frequencies for channels, people near the Canada–United States border can watch digital television programming from television stations in either country where available. The ATSC standards are also used in Mexico, the Dominican Republic, Suriname, and South Korea.

Jurisdiction over terrestrial broadcasting in Canada is primarily regulated by Innovation, Science and Economic Development Canada (ISED) and the Canadian Radio-television and Telecommunications Commission (CRTC). ISED has jurisdiction over the allotment of the terrestrial spectrum, and the CRTC has jurisdiction over the allotment of broadcast licences.

The CRTC imposed in 28 mandatory digital markets, a digital transition deadline for full power transmitters to switch from analogue transmitters to digital transmitters by 31 August 2011 if licensed broadcasters wanted to continue operating in those markets, with the exception of some CBC transmitters. Two weeks before the deadline, the CBC transmitters were given a temporary one-year extension to remain in analogue. No digital transition deadline has been set for low-power analogue transmitters and analogue transmitters outside the 28 mandatory digital markets.

In January 2007, ISED stopped issuing licences within Canada for new television transmitters broadcasting in analogue. All remaining analogue and digital terrestrial television signals across Canada broadcasting within the 600 MHz band were scheduled to either move out of the 600 MHz band or shut down no later than 2022 under an ISED schedule published in 2017; which happened in January 2022.

== History ==
The digital television transition in Canada and the United States will result in spectrum on channels 52 to 69 being re-allocated for other purposes. The United States government already auctioned most of this spectrum and Canada is planning on doing the same. The United States government, using some proceeds of the spectrum auction, funded an education campaign in advance of the transition, provided subsidies to many broadcasters in support of transitioning to digital, and provided subsidies to consumers for digital to analogue converter boxes. In contrast, the Canadian government did not provide any similar funding in support of the digital television transition. The Canadian government's most visible efforts to support the public in the transition to digital over-the-air television has been in the form of a website, along with some newspaper, radio, and television advertisements in the month leading up to the transition deadline.

Engineering firm Spectrum Expert Inc. estimated a total cost to Canadian broadcasters of $378-425 million to convert all 738 Canadian full-power television transmitters to DTV on their newly assigned channels; if the 1238 low-power transmitters were converted, costs would increase further. Some of the highest costs were for existing full-power VHF rebroadcast transmitters that would have to be replaced by new UHF facilities in locations far from broadcast studios. As a worst-case scenario, CTV-owned CJOH-TV-6 and CJOH-TV-8 were estimated to have a conversion cost of over four million dollars each. While CTV threatened to shut down a long list of these full-power rebroadcasters on August 31, 2009, as of 2011 the transmitters are still on the air.

Several broadcasters, including the CBC, argued that there is no viable business case for a comprehensive digital conversion strategy in Canada. Converting a transmitter to digital has upfront capital equipment costs in the hundreds of thousands of dollars, which can in more extreme cases reach over a million dollars, though some cost recovery in energy costs is possible due to lower transmission power required to cover an area as compared to analogue, if the same channel is used. At CRTC hearings in 2007 on the future direction of regulatory policy for television, broadcasters proposed a number of strategies, including funding digital conversion by eliminating restrictions on the amount of advertising that television broadcasters are permitted to air, allowing terrestrial broadcasters to charge cable viewers a subscription fee (fee-for-carriage) similar to that already charged by cable specialty channels, permitting licence fees similar to those that fund the BBC in the United Kingdom, or eliminating terrestrial television broadcasting entirely and moving to an exclusively cable-based distribution model.

The CRTC ultimately decided to relax restrictions on advertising, gradually removing all limits to the number of advertisements per hour of broadcast programming, as the funding mechanism. A CRTC statement issued in June 2008 indicated that as of that date, only 22 digital transmitters had been fully installed across the entire country, and expressed the regulator's concern that Canada's television broadcasters were not adequately preparing for the shift to digital broadcasting.

The 2008 financial crisis and subsequent Great Recession adversely affected advertising sales, the primary source of revenue for most broadcasters. Inadequate revenue in combination with debt incurred from purchasing other media companies caused Canwest, owner of the Global Television Network, to file for bankruptcy protection and to be subsequently purchased by Shaw Communications. Some Global Television Network and CTV stations in smaller markets were closed or sold. Seeking further sources of revenue, the television broadcasters including CTV launched an aggressive and somewhat successful campaign to re-open debate on introducing value for signal from cable and satellite television providers in 2009.

On August 6, 2010, CBC/Radio-Canada announced in a press release that only its existing digital stations, along with both Alberta CBC Television originating stations plus all Télévision de Radio-Canada (SRC) originating stations in Quebec City and Moncton, would be DTV-ready in time for the August 2011 deadline. The remaining CBC/SRC originating O&Os were to be converted a year later in August 2012, subject to CRTC approval. In December 2010, CBC/Radio-Canada updated the information on its website to state that it was striving to convert originating O&O by August 31, 2011. The CBC stated that it does not intend on transitioning any of its full-power repeaters to digital, despite in some cases being in markets (such as Kitchener, London and Saskatoon) required to convert by August 31, 2011.

In many instances, stations transitioning to digital continued utilizing the same channel, antenna or other facilities for their new digital transmitters after the end of transition. To save costs, with the exception of some stations in the largest markets, stations chose to flash cut from analogue to digital at the transition deadline rather than spending on the infrastructure and energy costs needed to broadcast the station in analogue and digital at the same time.

Leading up to the transition deadline, CRTC expressed concern that "if all broadcasters wait until the last moment to proceed to the transition, there could be a shortage of professional engineers and competent technicians capable of assuming the development of new plans and the installation of new systems and structures". Due to limited engineering resources, Global Television Network flash cut its transmitters over a 2-month period leading up to the deadline and TV Ontario flash cut its transmitters two weeks before the deadline. In contrast, most other networks and stations converted at the deadline.

There are no requirements for new televisions sold in Canada to include digital tuners (as they must in the US market), nor are there any labelling requirements for analogue-only receivers; some new televisions may be unable to tune a digital signal without an external ATSC tuner. As of 2010, an estimated 900,000 Canadians relying on antennas prior to the transition deadline were expected to lose over-the-air television reception by the transition deadline, as they were not ready for the digital transition. While a new HDTV receiver connected to a terrestrial television antenna will receive OTA digital television, Canadian regulations do not require cable television operators to carry these free local HDTV signals in unencrypted digital format on their systems.

== Deployment ==
CITY-TV was the first Canadian station to provide digital terrestrial service, first broadcasting in January 2003, and going full-time in March 2003. The first HD broadcast in Canada was CBC Sports' coverage of the Heritage Classic, an outdoor NHL game. The CBC ultimately launched a high definition feed of their eastern (Toronto) flagship CBLT in 2005, later launching feeds in Vancouver, Ottawa, and Montreal. As of 2008, other digital stations on-air included the CBC and Radio-Canada stations in Toronto and Montreal, as well as CTV's CFTO and CIVT, and Quebecor Media's independent station CKXT.

The first Canadian broadcaster to have delivered a digital-only terrestrial TV signal of any type, CKXT-TV (in Ottawa and London), signed on its pair of digital-only transmitters in 2008. These were both rebroadcasters of the same Toronto station with no local programme origination; the main Toronto station transmitted in both analogue and digital format. The first stations to complete the digital transition (on their main signals) were Trois-Rivières, Quebec's CFKM-DT, followed by CISA-DT in Lethbridge, Alberta.

As of July 2011, digital television broadcasts had commenced in just 11 of Canada's largest markets, but nearly all of the stations in mandatory markets ended up meeting the transition deadline. The stations that did not meet the deadline fall into two categories. First, there were some stations that had delays in converting to digital due to financial or technical issues. Second, are the CBC rebroadcaster transmitters in mandatory markets, and CTV's Access transmitters in Calgary, AB and Edmonton, AB. In the CBC's case, the CBC obtained an over year extension to convert its transmitters, publicly stating that it was not planning on converting these transmitters. The CBC later announced that all its analogue transmitters will be permanently shut down on July 31, 2012, and will not be replaced. In the case of CTV's Access transmitters, the network chose to shut them down at the transition deadline rather than converting them to digital.

Broadcasting digital terrestrial signals instead of analogue offers numerous advantages to the viewer, such as the following: support for high definition (HD) picture, support for 5 speaker surround sound, support for information on the current and the next few programs shown on the channel, support for sub-channels, Solomon-Reed error correction to eliminate multipath (ghosting), and support for mobile devices (i.e. ATSC-M/H). Canadian broadcasters have implemented many of the listed features to varying extents. CJON-DT in St. John's has become the first to offer different content on a subchannel, in the form of sister radio station CHOZ-FM on an audio-only subchannel, and CIII-DT in Toronto offers an SD simulcast of its HD feed on a subchannel, which is allowed under current CRTC licensing policies. On August 17, 2012, the CRTC gave approval to low-power community station CFTV-TV in Leamington, Ontario to broadcast four local subchannels on its digital signal, making it the first station in Canada to launch original content on its multiplex channels. Further, there are currently no transmitters broadcasting TV signals intended for mobile devices, though CBLFT-DT has done occasional test broadcasts of a mobile simulcast of sister station CBLT-DT in 2011 and 2012.

== Transition details ==
The Canadian Radio-television and Telecommunications Commission (CRTC) initially decided not to enforce a single date for ending analogue broadcasts, opting to let market forces decide when the switchover will occur. It subsequently reversed its position, on May 17, 2007, setting an analogue shutoff date of August 31, 2011, just over two years after the American transition date of June 12, 2009. Mandatory markets with a transmitter that does not transition to digital by the deadline will lose the over-the-air signal for the corresponding station permanently or until a digital transmitter is brought on-the-air for that station in that area. Note that the transition deadline only concerns over-the-air signals and does not impact other televisions reception methods in Canada such as over the Internet (already digital), cable (some analogue, most digital), or satellite (already digital).

On July 6, 2009, the CRTC issued a decision that limited the required digital conversion to mandatory markets meeting any of the following criteria:

- the National Capital Region, provincial capitals, and territorial capitals
- markets served by multiple originating stations (including CBC stations)
- markets with populations greater than 300,000.

On March 14, 2011, the CRTC removed territorial capitals as mandatory markets on the basis that these are small and remote markets, and that only 1 of the 6 transmitters in these markets were planned to be converted to digital, while the remainder of the transmitters would be shut down rather than converted.

On March 18, 2011, the CRTC mandated a requirement that television stations must broadcast public service announcements regarding the digital over-the-air television transition from May 1, 2011, until August 31, 2011. Stations must broadcast these ads 6 times a day, and increase this to 8 times a day starting August 1, 2011 or one month before the digital transition date for that station, whichever is sooner. Also by May 1, 2011, broadcasters must post on their websites about the broadcasters' specific plans for digital transition.

On August 18, 2011, the CRTC issued a decision that allowed the CBC's mandatory market rebroadcasting transmitters in analogue to remain on-air until August 31, 2012. When the CRTC made this announcement, the CBC communicated that it planned on requesting an extension to remain broadcasting in analogue past the August 31, 2012 deadline. Although the CRTC allowed the CBC the extension to remain in analogue, the corporation's full power transmitters occupying channels 52 to 69 were still required to either relocate to channels 2 to 51 or become low power transmitters. In some cases, the CBC has opted reduce the power of existing transmitters to low power transmitters, which will result in signal loss for some viewers.

List of Mandatory Markets:

- Alberta: Calgary, Edmonton, Lethbridge, Lloydminster
- British Columbia: Vancouver, Victoria
- Manitoba: Winnipeg
- New Brunswick: Saint John, Moncton, Fredericton
- Newfoundland and Labrador: St. John's
- Nova Scotia: Halifax
- Prince Edward Island: Charlottetown
- Ontario: Barrie, Hamilton, Kitchener, London, Ottawa–Gatineau, Thunder Bay, Toronto, Windsor
  Note: Barrie and Hamilton are included in the Toronto market since their stations compete in the Toronto market
- Quebec: Montreal, Quebec City, Rivière-du-Loup, Rouyn-Noranda/Val-d'Or, Saguenay, Sherbrooke, Trois-Rivières
- Saskatchewan: Regina, Saskatoon

Note that the list below does not take into account plans of network affiliate stations.

Network	Language	Mandatory transmitters digital?	DTV URL	Notes
CBC	English	Partial	Link	(Note: 15 mandatory transmitters were converted to digital, while 13 were not.) (Note: CBC and Radio-Canada combined shut down 607 analogue transmitters on July 31, 2012, but claims that these only serve 1.7% of the Canadian population.)
Ici Radio-Canada Télé	French	Partial	Link	(Note: 14 mandatory transmitters were converted to digital, while another 14 were not.)
Citytv	English	Yes	—N/a	—N/a
CTV	English	Yes	—N/a	—N/a
CTV 2	English	Partial	—N/a	(Note: Access transmitters in Calgary and Edmonton were shut down on August 31, 2011.)
Global	English	Yes	Link	
Omni	English / Multilingual	Yes	—N/a	—N/a
TVA	French	Yes	Link	—N/a
TFO	French	No	—N/a	(Note: analogue transmitters, which had limited reception in Ottawa and Montreal, were shut down on July 31, 2012. Now only available via paid TV.)
TVOntario	English	Yes	Link	(Note: TVO also converted three non-mandatory analogue transmitters with former UHF channels between 52 and 69. Digital transmitters had lower channel numbers. TVO shut down 114 analogue transmitters on July 31, 2012, but claims that these only serve around 1% of Ontario's population.)
Télé-Québec	French	Yes	Link	(Note: Non-mandatory transmitters were converted to digital by early September 2011.)
Noovo (formerly V)	French	Yes	—N/a	—N/a

Although the majority of the over-the-air transmitters that were planned to be converted to digital made this conversion by August 31, 2011, a handful of stations had delays and were permitted to remain broadcasting in analogue. In February 2012, CFTU-TV converted its transmitter to digital, marking the last of the mandatory market transmitters planned to become digital, to finally make the switch. This left 23 CBC and Radio-Canada rebroadcast transmitters in mandatory markets being required to transition to digital by August 31, 2012, though the CBC shut down all of its remaining analogue television transmitters on July 31, 2012, with no further transmitters made digital.

Following the August 31, 2011 deadline, some channels requested to make changes to their digital transmitters to improve the signal. Requested changes included the following (note that this is a list of applications to the CRTC and does not reflect what the CRTC has approved or what has been implemented):

- CBC / Radio-Canada: CBVT-DT (Radio-Canada - Quebec) and CBOFT-DT (Radio-Canada - Ottawa) - moving from VHF to UHF; CKSH-DT (Radio-Canada - Sherbrooke) - increasing power on VHF
- Channel Zero Inc: CHCH-DT (Hamilton) - moving from VHF to UHF
- Global: CIII-DT (Kitchener) and CIII-DT-6 (Ottawa) - moving from VHF to UHF
- V Interactions Inc: CFRS-DT (Saguenay) - increasing power on VHF

=== Non-mandatory markets ===
Most stations have announced no plans for converting or shutting down analogue transmitters outside mandatory markets required to transition to digital by August 31, 2011, but here are some exceptions:

- Aboriginal Peoples Television Network (APTN), which has a network of transmitters in the Yukon and the Northwest Territories, and one in northern Alberta, shut down 39 low power transmitters on August 31, 2011, representing nearly half of its transmitters.
- CBC / Radio-Canada converted its Rimouski, QC Radio-Canada transmitter (CJBR-DT) to digital on August 31, 2011, and its Yellowknife, NT CBC transmitter (CFYK-TV) on August 1, 2012. CBC has stated that only the 27 originating station transmitters, which include Yellowknife and Rimouski, are to be converted to digital. On July 31, 2012, the CBC permanently shut down its 620 remaining analogue television transmitters.
- Corus Entertainment, owner of CKWS, had to relocate a rebroadcast transmitter located in Brighton, ON to a lower channel because it was on a channel above 52, which had to be vacated by August 31, 2011. In addition to relocating this transmitter to a lower channel, the transmitter was converted to digital, but (as a repeater of an analogue station) offers an only standard definition.
- CTV had to relocate a rebroadcast transmitter of CFTO located in Peterborough, ON to a lower channel because it was on a channel above 52, which had to be vacated by August 31, 2011. In addition to relocating this transmitter to a lower channel, the transmitter was converted to digital.
- Global had converted all of its transmitters to digital by 2016. The exception is its Fort Erie transmitter, which was shut down on August 31, 2011, with coverage instead provided by Global's Toronto transmitter.
- Newcap Radio (formerly Newcap Broadcasting), owner of Lloydminster stations CITL and CKSA, shut down most of these stations' transmitters outside the Lloydminster area on August 31, 2011, despite the fact there is no requirement to make changes or to shut down these transmitters.
- Télé Inter-Rives' stations CKRT, CIMT, and CFTF Rivière-du-Loup, QC and their translators were converted to digital on August 31, 2011. Carleton-sur-Mer, QC station CHAU and its associated translators were converted to digital a few months later.
- Télé-Québec converted all of its transmitters to digital, all located in Quebec, by September 1, 2011.
- TFO (Télé-Française d'Ontario) shut down its 3 full power analogue transmitters in Sudbury, ON, Hawkesbury, ON, and Pembroke, ON, along with one lower analogue power transmitter on July 31, 2012. According to TFO, the transmitter towers are owned by TV Ontario, which began decommissioning them on July 31, 2012, thus the TFO transmitters had to shut down. After July 31, 2012, TFO only had some low power analogue transmitters remaining.
- TVOntario permanently shut down all of its 114 analogue TV transmitters (14 full power and 100 low power) on July 31, 2012. Previously, in August 2011, TVOntario had to relocate three transmitters, in Chatham, ON, Belleville, ON, and Cloyne, ON to lower channels because they were on channels above 52, which had to be vacated by August 31, 2011. When the three transmitters were moved to lower channels, they were also converted to digital.

=== Transmitters using channels 51 to 69 ===
The 700 MHz band, occupying channels 52 to 69, occupied by television transmitters, is being re-allocated for mobile telecommunications devices and public safety communication. The mobile telecommunications portion of the spectrum is to be auction by the Canadian government to telecommunications companies in 2013. Industry Canada stopped issuing broadcast certificates for the upper part of this channel range in 2000 and the remainder of this channel range in 2007. On August 22, 2011, the United States' Federal Communications Commission announced a freeze on all future applications for broadcast stations requesting to use channel 51, to prevent adjacent-channel interference to the 700 MHz band. On December 16, 2011, Industry Canada placed a moratorium on future television stations using Channel 51 for broadcast use, to prevent adjacent-channel interference to the 700 MHz band.

All remaining transmitters occupying channels 52 to 69 are low power analogue and no new transmitters are allowed to be added to this channel range. The Government of Canada has not set a deadline for low power transmitters to vacate this channel range. Industry Canada has proposed that if notification is given for a transmitter to cease transmitting within this channel range, it will have 2 years to vacate the channel, if in a rural area, and 1 year, if it is in an urban area. All of the remaining transmitters in the channel 52 to 69 range, are subject to the 2-year notification period.

On July 31, 2012, CBC / Radio-Canada and TVOntario shut down all of their analogue transmitters, resulting in a combined total of 21 transmitters shutting down from the channel 52 to 69 range.

As of January 2013, based on Industry Canada's database of TV transmitters and based on transmitters known to have been permanently shut down, there are 15 remaining television transmitters occupying channels 52 to 69, all low power analogue, located in the following communities:

- Cheticamp, NS (3 transmitters)
- Chetwynd, BC (2 transmitters)
- Crescent Valley, BC (CH5646, low power channel 51)
- Fort St. James, BC (9 transmitters)
- London, ON (CHCH-DT-2, channel 51)
- Santa Rosa, BC (1 transmitter, rebroadcaster of Global Television Network's CHAN-DT) - By September 2016, this will be converted to digital, causing a move to the channel 2-50 range. Conversion to digital is per a commitment by Shaw Communications, when it purchased the Global Television Network.
- Winnipeg, MB (CBWFT-DT, channel 51)

Except for the transmitter in Santa Rosa, the transmitters in the channel 52 to 69 range are all community operated transmitters.

== See also ==
- 700 MHz auction in Canada
- Category A services
- Category B services
- Category C services
- List of television stations in Canada by call sign
- List of Canadian television networks (table)
- List of Canadian television channels
- List of Canadian specialty channels
- List of Canadian stations available in the United States
- List of foreign television channels available in Canada
- List of television stations in North America by media market
- List of United States television stations available in Canada
- Multichannel television in Canada
