= Made in Punjab TV =

Canadian Punjabi-language television channel

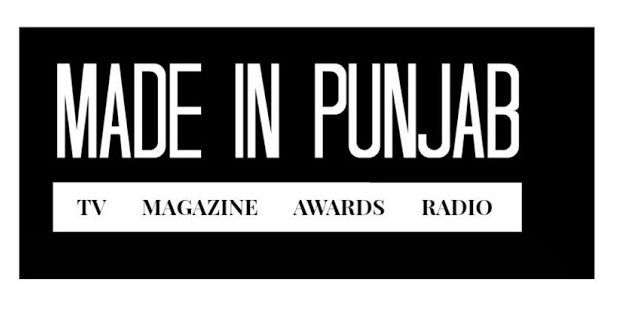
- Country: Canada
- Broadcast area: National
- Headquarters: Surrey, British Columbia

Programming
- Picture format: 720p (SDTV)

Ownership
- Owner: Studio 7 Production, & Navalpreet Rangi

History
- Launched: March 2013

Links
- Website: www.punjabitv.ca

Made in Punjab TV, also known as Punjabi TV, is a Canadian Category B Punjabi language specialty channel with select programming in English. It is owned by Studio 7 Production and Navalpreet Rangi, and features a mix of programming, including Punjabi documentaries, news and music. The channel focuses on faith-related art, prose and poetry. Made in Punjab aims to re-introduce Canadian Punjabi to their legacy and appreciate the need to preserve their culture and faith. Made in Punjab TV is also available on YouTube.
