= German Kino Plus =

- Country: United States
- Broadcast area: United States; Canada
- Headquarters: Marietta, Georgia

Programming
- Picture format: 4:3 (576i, SDTV)

Ownership
- Owner: FennFamLLC

History
- Launched: May 4, 2004

German Kino Plus (GKP) is a German language television channel in the United States owned by FennFamLLC. It is the first German-language television channel based in the U.S. and features programming from Germany.

== History ==
German Kino Plus was officially launched on May 4, 2007, on Dish Network.

On October 2, 2012, Dish Network dropped the channel from its line-up and it went off the air. The following note was posted by GKP on its official Facebook page:

As many of you know, GKP is no longer available on Dish Network. I want to thank everyone who has supported GKP over the last 5 plus years the channel has been on the air. Your support has been amazing and I have enjoyed bringing you great television from your homeland. Danke to everyone who have been such great fans, you made this channel great!!"

In December 2012, German Kino Plus was re-launched after securing distribution in Canada with the cable TV provider Cogeco. It was subsequently launched on Bell Fibe TV in March 2013 and on Manitoba Telecom Services in December 2013.

== Programming ==
German Kino Plus features German cinema, popular TV series and German documentaries. All programming is broadcast uncut and free of commercials, and the line-up is constantly updated with new films and TV series premiering every month. GKP programming is divided into the following four categories:

- Theatrical German films
- Classic German films
- Documentaries
- Top-rated television series from the popular German channels ARD, ZDF and RTL

== Canadian distribution ==
On October 28, 2010, German Kino Plus was officially added to the CRTC's approved list of foreign services, allowing the channel to expand into Canada. Ethnic Channels Group, which sponsored the application to put GKP on the approved list, is the official Canadian distributor of the channel.

The channel was officially launched in Canada on December 12, 2012, available via Cogeco Cable.
