= Naomi Achu =

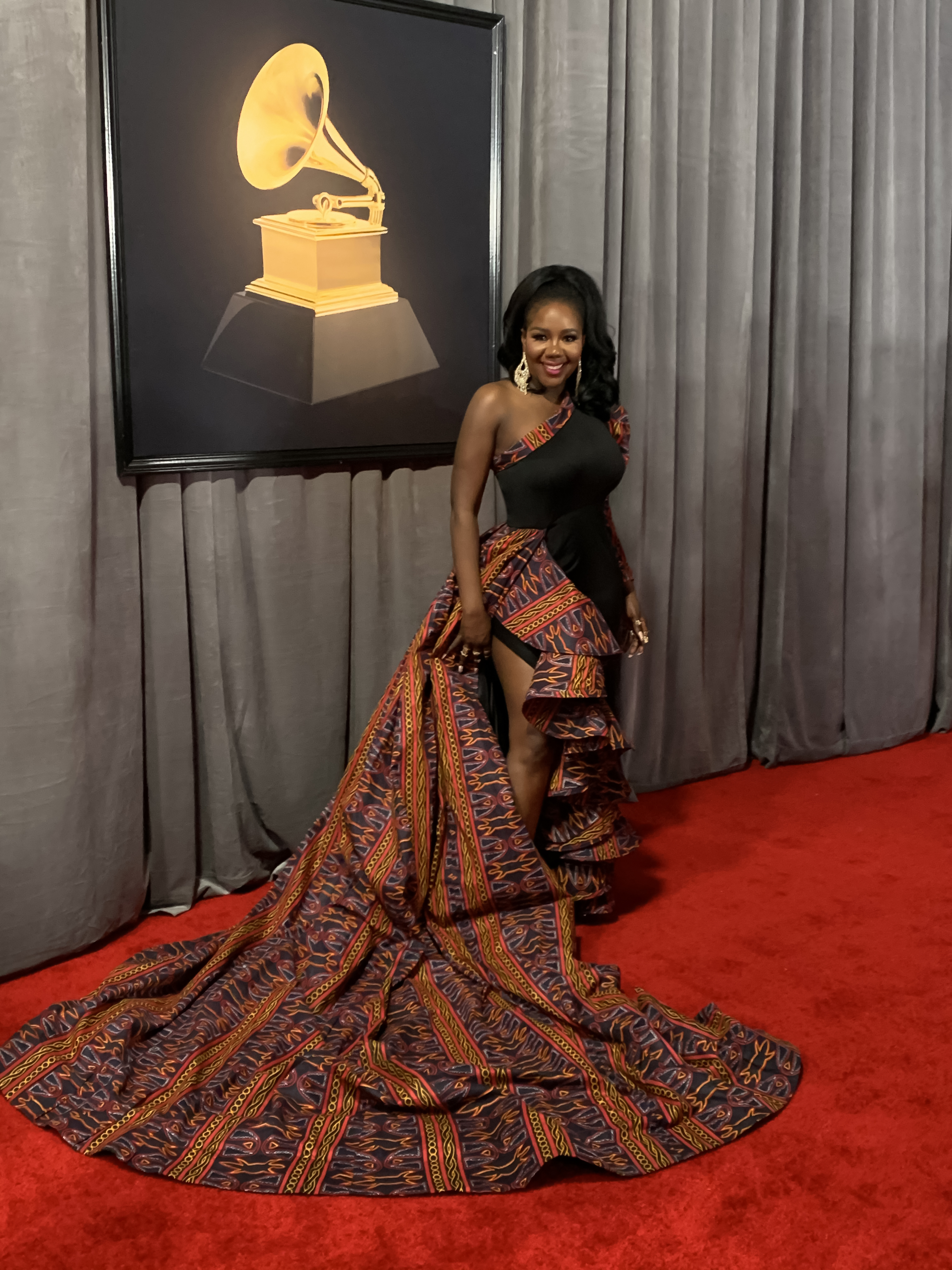
- Achu at the 2019 Grammy Awards

Background information
- Born: Fruh-Ngwing Achu; Bamenda, Cameroon
- Origin: Saker Baptist College
- Genres: rap
- Occupations: singer
- Years active: 2009–present

Naomi Achu, born Fruh-Ngwing Achu, is a Cameroonian singer, rapper, and songwriter. She rose to prominence with the song “Alhadji”. which was featured in the 8 season of Big Brother Africa. She is also considered as “Queen of Bamenda.”

== Early life ==
Hailing from Bamenda, the capital of Cameroon's Northwest Region, Naomi was born Fruh-Ngwing Achu to a family of eight; she is the last of six children. Her father was a diplomat to the Cameroonian Embassy in London, and her mother was an educator of primary and secondary school children.

Naomi started writing songs at age nine, She attended Saker Baptist College in Limbe and Baptist High School in Buea (both in Cameroon's Southwest Region), where she had her earliest chances at singing. For a while, Naomi was the automated voice for MTN Cameroon.

== Music career ==
Naomi moved to the United States in 2004, where she professional started her singing career. By the time she released her first record, an EP called No Boundaries, in 2009, she had started rapping. She was featured the following year in a track called “Africans,” which is an African remix of “Hold Yuh” by Jamaican reggae singer Gyptian. Also in 2010, she released the Camerican Dream mixtape as a third of Cameroonian trio Avin-u C, which also features male singer Eddy B. and male rapper H.Bolo.

Her performance during the 2011 African Festival of Boston won her a rave review from Globe Correspondent, Siddhartha Mitter, prompting him to write "Maryland-based Achu is a cosmopolitan polymath: A gifted rapper and poised R&B singer, she was born in Cameroon and raised there and in the United Kingdom before coming here. Unabashedly pop with an inspirational streak, her sound finds a balance between African dance-floor exhortations and a global club feel."

On July 23, 2011, Naomi released her debut solo album (and second record), Positive Energy, under her Tribal Invasion record label. Its best-known song is “Alhadji,” in which she deceives men of wealth. “Alhadji” steadily became Naomi's signature hit. It was played on one of the episodes of Big Brother Africa’s eight season (Big Brother Africa 8, also known as Big Brother Africa: The Chase). Additionally, “Alhadji” scored Naomi a Best Blues/Pop award nomination by the World Music & Independent Film Festival, and its video held the number one spot on Afrotainment’s Top 10 program for several weeks. Positive Energy is also notable for containing “Suffer Don Finish,” which features Congolese musician Awilo Longomba.

Positive Energy immensely raised her profile in the Afro pop world. She performed alongside Congolese singer-songwriter Fally Ipupa at a pre-party for the 2011 BET Awards. She also opened for Nigerian musician Timaya at the 51st Nigerian Independence concert in Dallas, Texas named after him. On February 24, 2012, Naomi performed at the Smithsonian's African Art Museum as part of the “African Underground” event in celebration of Black History Month.

On July 28, 2012, Naomi won the Best Female Artist award at the inaugural Cameroon Entertainment Awards. On November 8, 2014, she won the African Female Musician of the Year award at the inaugural DMV African Entertainment Awards.

In preparation for her follow-up album in 2016, Naomi has released three singles: “Wa Fun Mi Shuga” (or “Suga”) on October 7, 2012; “It’s My Life” on December 21, 2013; and "Busy Body" on December 19, 2015. Naomi finally released her sophomore album, Long Live the Queen, on April 30, 2016. "Busy Body" in particular won Naomi a 2016 N.E.G.A. Award (NExt Generation Award) for Best Female Artist, as well as an AFRIMA (All Africa Music Awards) 2016 Award for Best Female Artiste in Inspirational Music.

== Influences ==
Naomi draws inspiration from artists from a vast array of genres. They include Angelique Kidjo, Whitney Houston, Michael Jackson and Janet Jackson, Mary Mary, Makoma, Mary J. Blige, Kirk Franklin, Lauryn Hill, and Erykah Badu.

== Other ==
In addition to running her own label, Naomi is founder and CEO of International Nurses for Africa. She got a Bachelor of Science in Nursing from Marymount University in 2010.

== Discography ==
=== EPs ===
No Boundaries (2009)

=== Albums ===
- Positive Energy (2011)
- Long Live the Queen (2016)

=== Singles ===
- “Alhadji” (2011)
- “Wa Fun Mi Suga” (2012)
- “It’s My Life” (2013)
- “Busy Body” (2015)
- "Gbagbe" featuring Skales (2016)
- "Shower Your Blessings" feat. Pardon C (2017)
- "Bill Collector" (2020)

=== Guest appearances ===
- "Soldier" by Eddy Bee (2018)
- "Somebody" by Peter Jericho (2020)
