= Afrotainment =

Family of television channels

- Country: United States
- Headquarters: New York City, U.S. Orlando, Florida, U.S.

Programming
- Language: English
- Picture format: 480i (SDTV); 1080i (HDTV)

Ownership
- Owner: Soundview Africa

Links
- Website: www.afrotainment.us www.afros.tv

Availability

Streaming media
- Roku: YEBO; Mizik; OYEEE; AFRICA24 Music; NAIJA Music; CAMER Music
- Apple TV: YEBO
- Amazon Fire TV: YEBO

Afrotainment, often branded as simply Afro, is an American media company based in New York City, founded by television producer Yves Bollanga in 2005, and owned by Soundview Africa. The company operates linear television channels and digital properties that target African American viewership. Its productions include budgeted films, television series and talk shows.

== History ==
On June 22, 2005, Afrotainment launched 3A TELESUD, its first channel on DISH Network. Initial launch was followed by 3 more carriage agreements between 2008 and 2011 for Afrotainment Movies, Afrotainment Music, TV9JA, and OUI TVOn.

On October 13, 2011, Afrotainment launched Afrotainment Plus, its first cable channel. It was made available on IO Africa on Channel 1101.

On September 19, 2013, Afrotainment launched 4 new channels in Canada on Bell Fibe TV; marking the company's first expansion outside of the United States.

On December 5, 2014, Afrotainment launched Haiti HD a network targeting the Haitian community on Bell Fibe TV Canada. On October 30, 2016, the channel began on Videotron in Canada.

In August 2015, Afrotainment launched YEBO, an OTT music video on demand app on Amazon Fire TV, Roku, Apple TV.

On March 3, 2016, Afrotainment launched AFRO, its Polycultural Black channel, and ABO on Verizon FIOS.

On June 28, 2017, AFRO was made available on Sling TV in its Lifestyle Plus package. The channel was removed on June 26, 2019.

On November 15, 2018, Comcast announced an agreement to launch AFRO on Xfinity.

== Programming ==
Afrotainment programming is produced for, or acquired from, the African and Black diaspora. The company produces its programming from its Orlando TV Studios: including Point of View, a daytime woman talk show; Afrotainers, an Entertainment News show; Afrohits Top 10, a chart of the ten best Afro-centric music videos; The Lowdown, a late night comedy show; Journey, a talk show.

Afrotainment also broadcasts soccer matches of the Confederation of African Football, such as the CAF Champions League, CAF Confederation Cup, CAF African Nation Championship, and CAF Youth Championship.

The Afrotainment Museke Online Africa Music Awards, which is held every September, is simulcasted across Afrotainment's US channels and online platforms.

=== Channels ===
The company currently owns and operates the following 8 TV channels:

AFRO TV – Polycultural Black Television channel.

Afrotainment – Afro-centric general entertainment service, broadcasting in High-definition; programming includes TV series, films, talk shows and reality series.

Afrotainment Plus – Cable centric service featuring the best programming from Afrotainment & Afrotainment Music.

Afrotainment Music – Afro-centric music service featuring music from the African continent. Programming includes music videos, live performances and entertainment programs.

Africa Box Office (ABO) – Afro-centric movie service featuring the best in film from the African continent. It airs over 100 new movies every year from Nollywood and other movie houses throughout Africa.

TV Naija – General entertainment service aimed at Nigerian community, airs TV series & music from Nigeria.

Oui TV – Cameroonian, Ivorian and African sitcoms and dramas in French.

YEBO – Afro-Caribbean music video on Demand (Apple TV, Amazon Fire, Roku).
