= List of television stations in Alberta =

This is a list of broadcast television stations serving cities in the Canadian province of Alberta.

| City of licence | Analog channel | Digital channel | Virtual channel | Frequency (MHz) | Callsign | Network | Notes |
|---|---|---|---|---|---|---|---|
| Chateh | 13 | | | | CKCA-TV | APTN | satellite of Aboriginal Peoples Television Network |
| Chateh | 11 | | | | CH4301 | CTV Two | |
| Banff | | 7 | 7.1 | | CFCN-DT-2 | CTV | |
| Banff | 13 | | | | CICT-TV-2 | Global | |
| Bassano | 6 | | | | CFCN-TV-7 | CTV | |
| Bonnyville | 7 | | | | CITL-TV-4 | CTV | |
| Bonnyville | 9 | | | | CKSA-TV-2 | Global | |
| Bow Island | 39 | | | | CJIL-TV-1 | Ind. | |
| Brooks | 3 | | | | CISA-TV-2 | Global | |
| Brooks | 9 | | | | CFCN-TV-3 | CTV | |
| Burmis | 3 | | | | CISA-TV-1 | Global | |
| Burmis | 5 | | | | CFCN-TV-4 | CTV | |
| Calgary | | 25 | 2.1 | 536 | CICT-DT | Global | |
| Calgary | | 29 | 4.1 | 560 | CFCN-DT | CTV | |
| Calgary | | 20 | 5.1 | 506 | CKAL-DT | Citytv | |
| Calgary | | 21 | 9.1 | 512 | CBRT-DT | CBC | |
| Calgary | | 32 | 32.1 | 578 | CKCS-DT | yes TV | |
| Calgary | | 34 | 38.1 | 590 | CJCO-DT | Omni | |
| Canmore | | 26 | 45.1 | | CFCN-DT-14 | CTV | |
| Cardston | 32 | | | | CFSO-TV | Ind. | |
| Coleman | 8 | | | | CFCN-TV-18 | CTV | |
| Coleman | 12 | | | | CISA-TV-3 | Global | |
| Drumheller | 8 | | | | CICT-TV-1 | Global | |
| Drumheller | 12 | | | | CFCN-TV-1 | CTV | |
| Drumheller | 10 | | | | CFCN-TV-6 | CTV | |
| Edmonton | | 12 | 3.1 | 204 | CFRN-DT | CTV | |
| Edmonton | | 25 | 5.1 | 536 | CBXT-DT | CBC | |
| Edmonton | | 27 | 11.1 | 548 | CBXFT-DT | R-C | |
| Edmonton | | 13 | 13.1 | 210 | CITV-DT | Global | |
| Edmonton | | 30 | 45.1 | 566 | CKES-DT | yes TV | |
| Edmonton | | 17 | 51.1 | 488 | CKEM-DT | Citytv | |
| Edmonton | | 16 | 56.1 | 482 | CJEO-DT | Omni | |
| Grande Prairie | 13 | | | | CFRN-TV-1 | CTV | satellite of CFRN-DT Edmonton |
| High Prairie | 12 | | | | CIRE-TV | Community | |
| Lethbridge | | 29 | 2.1 | 662 | CKAL-DT-1 | Citytv | |
| Lethbridge | | 7 | 7.1 | 174 | CISA-DT | Global | Uses CICT-DT for Global Morning and Noon News Broadcasts. |
| Lethbridge | | 13 | 13.1 | 210 | CFCN-DT-5 | CTV | satellite of CFCN-DT Calgary |
| Lethbridge | | 17 | 17.1 | 488 | CJIL-DT | Ind. | |
| Lloydminster | | 2 | 2.1 | 54 | CKSA-DT | Citytv | |
| Lloydminster | | 4 | 4.1 | 66 | CITL-DT | CTV | |
| Maskwacis | 43 | | | | CHOB-TV | Community | |
| Medicine Hat | 6 | | | | CHAT-TV | Citytv | |
| Medicine Hat | 8 | | | | CFCN-TV-8 | CTV | satellite of CFCN-DT Calgary |
| Oyen | 2 | | | | CFCN-TV-16 | CTV | |
| Pigeon Mountain | 40 | | | | CFCN-DT-13 | CTV | |
| Pincher Creek | 9 | | | | CISA-TV-5 | Global | |
| Cypress County | 4 | | | | CHAT-TV-1 | Citytv | |
| Provost | 5 | | | | CITL-TV-2 | CTV | |
| Red Deer | | 15 | 4.1 | 479 | CKEM-DT-1 | Citytv | satellite of CKEM-DT Edmonton |
| Red Deer | | 8 | 8.1 | 183 | CFRN-DT-6 | CTV | satellite of CFRN-DT Edmonton |
| Red Deer | | 28 | 10.1 | 554 | CITV-DT-1 | Global | satellite of CITV-DT Edmonton |
| Wainwright | 6 | | | | CITL-TV-1 | CTV | |
| Waterton Park | 6 | | | | CFCN-TV-17 | CTV | |
| Waterton Park | 12 | | | | CISA-TV-4 | Global | |

== See also ==
- List of television stations in Canada
- Media in Canada
