= Rise and Shine =

Rise and Shine may refer to:

== Film and television ==
=== Films ===
- Rise and Shine (film), a 1941 film starring Jack Oakie
- "Rise and Shine" (Overwatch), a 2017 animated short based on the video game Overwatch

=== Series ===
- Rise & Shine (TV series), a 1989–2010 morning talk show that aired in Columbus, Georgia, U.S.
- Rise and Shine Pilipinas, a Philippine morning news program on PTV 4 (2020-present)
- Rise & Shine, a Canadian TV series broadcast by Crossroads Television System

=== Episodes ===
- "Rise and Shine" (Agents of S.H.I.E.L.D.), 2018
- "Rise and Shine" (SpongeBob SquarePants), 2007

== Music ==
=== Albums ===
- Rise and Shine (Aswad album), 1994
- Rise and Shine (The Bears album), 1988
- Rise & Shine (Ian McLagan album), 2004
- Rise and Shine (Randy Travis album) or the title song, 2002
- Rise & Shine (Sierra Leone's Refugee All Stars album), 2010
- Rise & Shine (Steppenwolf album) or the title song, 1990
- Rise and Shine (EP), by Cassadee Pope, or the title song, 2020
- Rise and Shine, by Adeaze, 2011
- Rise and Shine, by the Adicts, 2002
- Rise and Shine, by Cassadee Pope, 2020
- Rise and Shine, by the Lacs, 2019
- Rise and Shine, by Louna, 2013
- Rise and Shine, by Raffi, or the title song, 1982

=== Songs ===
- "Rise and Shine", the first section of the Pink Floyd song "Alan's Psychedelic Breakfast", 1970
- "Rise & Shine" (The Cardigans song), 1994
- "Rise and Shine" (Poe song), 1998
- "Rise and Shine" (children's song), a children's camp song
- "Rise 'n' Shine", by Dick Damron, 1971
- "Rise and Shine", by Deorro, 2017
- "Rise and Shine", by Eraserheads from Fruitcake, 1996
- "Rise and Shine", by J. Cole from Cole World: The Sideline Story, 2011
- "Rise and Shine", by One Minute Silence from Buy Now... Saved Later, 2000
- "Rise and Shine", original opening theme for the TV series The Flintstones, 1960
- "Rise and Shine", sung by Kylie Jenner to her daughter Stormi, 2019
- "Rise and Shine", by Niki and Gabi, a parody of Kylie Jenner's verse, 2019

== Other uses ==
- Rise and Shine, a 2006 novel by Anna Quindlen
- Rise and Shine State School, in Yalboroo, Queensland, Australia, 1936–c. 1962
