= List of programs broadcast by Yes TV =

This is a list of television programs currently and formerly broadcast by Yes TV, a regional religious-based television system in the Canadian provinces of Ontario and Alberta that also carries mainstream programming during primetime and afternoon hours.

== Current programming ==
(As of September 2016)

=== Original programming ===
- 100 Huntley Street
- The Doc Side
- Let's Talk (aired on CKCS and CKES only)
- RocKids TV
- Young Once

=== Entertainment programming ===
- A Day in a Life
- Chicago Hope
- Touched by an Angel
- Highway to Heaven
- Little Mosque on the Prairie
- The Beverly Hillbillies
- The Choir
- Dr. Quinn, Medicine Woman
- Everybody Loves Raymond
- Family Ties
- Green Force
- Harry
- Hot Bench
- Jeopardy!
- Judge Judy
- Making House
- Marriage Under Construction
- The King of Queens
- Wheel of Fortune
- The X Factor

=== Sports ===
- Canadian Basketball League games (beginning October 2016)

=== Late night ===
- Buzzr After Hours

== Former programming ==
=== Original programming ===
- Always Good News with Connie Smith
- Behind the Story
- Eye To Eye
- Faith Journal
- Full Circle
- Inside World Report
- Israel Today
- It's Your Call
- Listen Up!
- Messages
- Michael Coren Live (call-in show)
- The Michael Coren Show
- Most Requested
- Municipal Insight
- On the Front Line
- On the Line
- Passages
- Real Life
- Rhonda London
- Rise & Shine
- TQ (children's show)
- Uncommon Ground
- The Warehouse (program for teens)

=== Entertainment programming ===
- 7th Heaven (2000–2003, 2008–2009, 2010–2011)
- The Adventures of Ozzie and Harriet (2012–2014)
- ALF (2011–2014)
- Alice (1998–2004)
- Amen (1998–1999, 2008–2009)
- American Idol
- America's Funniest Home Videos
- The Andy Griffith Show (2000–2002, 2011–2014)
- The Brady Bunch (2000–2001, 2010–2011)
- Charles in Charge (2003–2004)
- Christy (2004–2005)
- Coach (2004–2006)
- The Cosby Show (1999–2000, 2010–2012)
- The Courtship of Eddie's Father (2000–2001)
- Danger Bay (2004–2005)
- Diff'rent Strokes(2005–2008)
- Dr. Quinn, Medicine Woman (1998–2000, 2003–2005, 2009–2010)
- Eight Is Enough (2002–2003)
- The Facts of Life (2006–2009)
- Family Affair (2001–2002)
- Family Matters (2008–2010)
- Family Feud
- Father Dowling Mysteries (2010)
- The Flying Nun (2001–2003)
- The Fresh Prince of Bel-Air (2006–2009, 2010–2011, 2012–2014)
- Full House (2004–2007, 2008–2009, 2010–2014, 2014–2015)
- Frasier (2018–2019)
- The Gilmore Girls (2015–2018)
- Gilligan's Island (2010–2012)
- Growing Pains (2000–2002)
- Happy Days (1998–2009, 2010–2011)
- Highway to Heaven (1998–1999)
- The Hogan Family (2000–2002, 2008–2009, 2010–2011)
- The Hughleys (2004–2005)
- The Jim Henson Hour (2003–2005)
- Kids Say the Darndest Things (2003–2004)
- Laverne & Shirley (2007–2009, 2010–2011)
- Leave It to Beaver (2001–2002)
- Life Goes On (2001–2002, 2010, 2011)
- Little House on the Prairie (1998–2004, 2009–2010, 2011-)
- The Lucy Show (2001–2002)
- Mad About You (2010–2011)
- Major Dad (2003–2004)
- Moesha (2002–2003)
- Mr. Belvedere (2002–2003, 2004)
- The Muppet Show (2003–2005)
- My Three Sons (1999–2000)
- The Nanny (2010)
- The Partridge Family (2010–2011)
- Promised Land (2000–2001, 2009–2010)
- Step by Step (2006–2008)
- Touched by an Angel (2003–2005)
- The Waltons (1998–1999, 2010–2014)
- Webster (2002–2003)
- The Wonder Years (2002–2003, 2005, 2010–2011, 2019–2020)
- Yes, Dear (2004–2006)

== See also ==
- Lists of Canadian television series
