= CKSA =

CKSA may refer to:

- CKSA-FM, a radio station (95.9 FM) licensed to Lloydminster, Alberta and Saskatchewan, Canada
- CKSA-DT, a television station (channel 2) licensed to Lloydminster, Alberta and Saskatchewan, Canada
