= CFXJ-FM =

Radio station in Toronto

Coordinates: 43.648611°N 79.381667°W

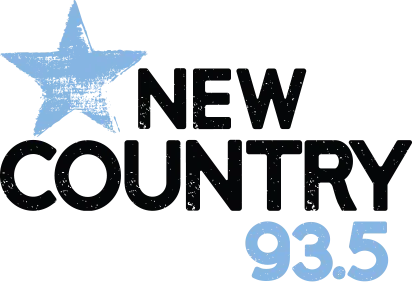
- Toronto, Ontario; Canada
- Broadcast area: Greater Toronto Area
- Frequency: 93.5 MHz (HD Radio)
- Branding: New Country 93.5

Programming
- Language: English
- Format: Country music

Ownership
- Owner: Stingray Group
- Sister stations: CHBM-FM

History
- First air date: February 9, 2001

Technical information
- Licensing authority: CRTC
- Class: B
- ERP: 1,058 watts average 3,706 watts peak
- HAAT: 298.7 metres (980 ft)

Links
- Webcast: Listen live
- Website: newcountry935.com

CFXJ-FM (93.5 FM, "New Country 93.5") is a radio station in Toronto, Ontario. Owned by Stingray Radio, it broadcasts a country music format. Its studios are located on Yonge Street at St. Clair Avenue in Toronto's Deer Park neighbourhood.

CFXJ was Canada's first Black-owned radio station, and was launched on February 9, 2001 under the on-air brand of Flow 93.5. From its launch through 2022, the station gravitated between various urban contemporary and rhythmic contemporary formats, maintaining the Flow branding for all but a three-year period from 2016 to 2019 where it branded as The Move instead.

The station went through several ownership changes, with CTVglobemedia buying the station in 2010, followed by Newcap Broadcasting in 2013 (as a condition of Bell Media's acquisition of Astral Media). Newcap was acquired by Stingray Group in 2018. In 2022, the station dropped the Flow format and flipped to adult hits as Today Radio, with Stingray reaching an agreement with the new owner of fellow urban station CKFG-FM to move the Flow branding there. In August 2024, the format was dropped, and the station began to soft launch a new country music format—which formally launched on September 3, 2024 as New Country 93.5.

CFXJ has an effective radiated power (ERP) of 1,058 watts (3,706 watts peak). The main transmitter is located atop First Canadian Place in Toronto's Financial District.

== History ==
=== Launch ===
Milestone Radio, a company incorporated by Denham Jolly, first applied to the Canadian Radio-television and Telecommunications Commission (CRTC) for an urban contemporary music station in 1989. Milestone was passed over in favour of a country music station, CISS. Jolly applied again in 1997, and was passed over in favour of CBLA, the Radio One station, which the CBC wanted to move to FM as it was leaving its longtime Toronto AM outlet, CBL.

Both decisions sparked controversy in Toronto, a city with Canada's largest minority population but with no urban contemporary outlet. Some accused the CRTC of passing over an urban station in favour of existing radio services as an example of racism. The lack of an urban station also created difficulties for Canadian hip-hop, reggae and R&B musicians, who had no radio outlets in Canada to play and promote their music.

The original logo of Flow 93.5 (2001–2007)

As well, the 99.1 signal which was awarded to the CBC was believed to be the last available FM frequency in the city. However, in 1998, the CBC found that it was able to surrender two of the CBC's repeater transmitters outside of Toronto due to CBLA's superior coverage of the region. In 2000, the CRTC opened applications for new services on these two frequencies. With Milestone's third application, the CRTC awarded the 93.5 frequency to the company on June 16 of that year.

CFXJ signed on the air at 9:35 p.m. on February 9, 2001, under the name Flow 93.5. "Roots, Rock, Reggae" by Bob Marley and the Wailers was the first song played. For several weeks, the station was automated. Live programming launched on March 1. Before the station became prominent in the Greater Toronto Area, many listeners would try to tune in to Buffalo, New York's WBLK, which has aired an urban contemporary format since the 1960s. Since CFXJ's debut, many Canadian hip hop and R&B musicians, including Jully Black, k-os, Kardinal Offishall and Jarvis Church have made the types of significant career breakthroughs that often eluded Canadian urban musicians in the 1990s.

=== Rhythmic top 40 era (2007–2014) ===
Logo used as "The New Flow 93.5" until 2011

In 2005, the station began to shift towards a more rhythmic direction. In 2007, the station re-branded as The New Flow 93.5, completing its shift to a rhythmic contemporary format. By 2009, with Rogers' relaunch of the Kiss Top 40 (CHR) format on CKIS, CFXJ shifted back towards an urban direction. However, this proved unsuccessful, and many of the adult urban tracks were dropped by March 2010.

On June 23, 2010, it was announced that CTVglobemedia's CHUM Radio would acquire the station, subject to CRTC approval. The transaction was approved on December 23. CHUM previously had a joint venture with Milestone with CHBN-FM in Edmonton, which was later sold to Rogers Radio along with CHST-FM in London. The station's headquarters were relocated from their longtime home at 211 Yonge Street to CTV's 250 Richmond Street West (near 299 Queen Street West, where MuchMusic and other CTV specialty television stations were based). In February 2011, the sale to CTVglobemedia (which was acquired by shareholder Bell Canada and renamed Bell Media several months later) was completed. Upon the closure of the sale, many on the staff were laid off, all specialty programming was cancelled, and the station shifted back to a rhythmic contemporary format.

CHUM's vice president of programming, David Corey, replaced Wayne Williams as PD and reshuffled the lineup. He brought in fellow ex-WJMN Boston imaging director Scott Morello as APD, and re-teamed morning host Melanie Martin with her fellow CKIS alumnus J.J. King. Midday personality Miss Ange, afternoon drive time personality Jeni, swing personality Peter Kash, MD Justin Dumont, promotions coordinator Angelique Knights, morning show producer Johnny Michaels, creative writer John Shannon, and producer Korey Bray, along with former sales manager Byron Garby and some other account representatives, were all retained. With the launch of urban AC competitor CKFG-FM, the station moved back to an urban direction once more. However, by December 2012, the station had moved back to a rhythmic CHR format.

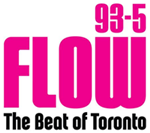
Third logo (2011–2015)

In March 2013, the Competition Bureau approved a proposal by Bell Media to acquire Astral Media, under the condition that it divest itself of several television services and radio stations. Following the closure of the merger in July 2013, CFXJ was placed in a blind trust pending its eventual sale. CFXJ and four other Astral Media radio stations were sold to Newcap Radio for $112 million. The deal was approved by the CRTC on March 19, 2014, and the sale closed on March 31, 2014. With the sale, CFXJ moved its studios to the former CFRB and CKFM studios at 2 St. Clair West (at Yonge and St. Clair).

=== Classic hip hop era (2014–2016) ===
Fourth logo (2015–2016)

In late 2014, influenced by the popularity of The Back in the Day Buffet noon-hour mix-show, as well as the growing popularity of the classic hip-hop format in the United States, the station revamped its playlist to include hip-hop hits, R&B and reggae tracks from the late 1980s to the early 2000s, while still playing some currents. In addition, CFXJ added a secondary slogan: "The Best Throwbacks and Hottest Hits".

By March 2015, the station's primary slogan was altered to "All The Best Throwbacks".

=== The Move, return to Flow (2016–2022) ===
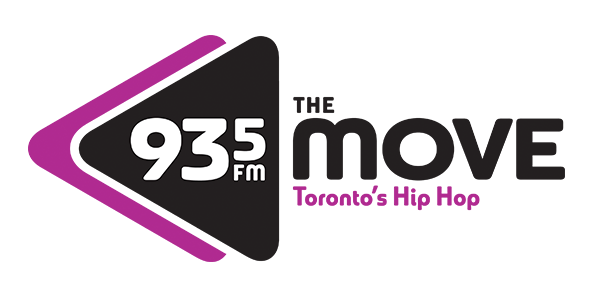
Logo as "The Move" (2016–2019)

On February 25, 2016, CFXJ went jockless and began promoting a "big move" to take place at 8 a.m. the following Monday (February 29). At that time, after playing "Over" by Toronto native Drake, the station flipped to rhythmic adult contemporary as 93.5 The Move, with a focus on rhythmic and hip-hop hits from the late 1980s, 1990s and 2000s. The first song on "The Move" was "The Way You Move" by OutKast. CFXJ joined CKBE Montreal as the only English-language rhythmic AC outlets in Canada.

As part of the rebrand, the station also axed numerous on air hosts, including Melanie Martin of the JJ & Melanie morning show, midday host Miss Ange, and evening host Megan Coady. Weekend host J'ness moved to sister station CIHT-FM in Ottawa prior to the rebrand. On November 6, 2017, CFXJ switched back to a rhythmic contemporary format once again, while maintaining the Move branding and a small amount of rhythmic recurrents. CFXJ also changed slogans to "Toronto's Hits. Toronto's Throwbacks." before changing to "Toronto's Hip Hop".

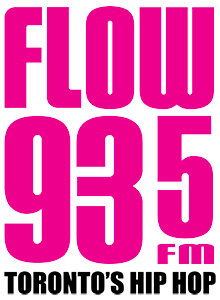
Logo under second iteration as "Flow" (2019–2022)

Newcap Radio was acquired by Stingray Group in October 2018. On February 11, 2019, CFXJ reverted to the Flow 93.5 branding and returned to an urban contemporary format.

=== Flow moves to 98.7; Today Radio (2022–2024) ===
On February 9, 2022, Stingray announced that it had reached an agreement with CKFG-FM and its new owner, Neeti P. Ray's CINA Media Group, to move the Flow branding to that station beginning February 14, and that 93.5 would launch a new format the same day. CFXJ subsequently went jockless, and much of its on-air staff was let go.

A Stingray executive stated that the company had originally wanted to "[bring] Flow back to its roots as a community-driven station". However, after realizing that this would have competed directly with CKFG, Stingray instead reached an agreement to transfer the Flow brand to that station. The relaunched Flow would add contemporary hip-hop to CKFG's existing format of R&B and Afro-Caribbean music, aiming to serve the entirety of Toronto's Black Canadian community.

Logo as "Today Radio" (2022-2024)

On February 13, CFXJ began stunting with a self-described "random selection" of pop songs, interspersed with promos for the new Flow on 93.5, and sweepers stating that "Today" was "arriving tomorrow". The following day at midnight, CFXJ relaunched as 93.5 Today Radio, an adult hits format with a focus on topical discussions and interactions with listeners. The brand and format were licensed from a Vancouver-based marketing company. The format is also aired on Pattison Media's CKCE-FM in Calgary, with similarities to the Now! hot adult contemporary format used by its sister station CKNO-FM Edmonton.

On September 20, 2022, the CRTC published applications by Stingray to add boosters for CFXJ on the 93.5 frequency in Mississauga and in the North York district of Toronto, which Stingray said would be the first single-frequency network implementation of its kind in Canada. (Note: A few other Canadian stations already operate synchronous repeaters; for example, CJKX-FM (95.9 MHz), licensed to Ajax in the eastern part of the Greater Toronto Area, has a repeater at 95.9 in Toronto. Stingray stated that its implementation would have used a new implementation branded as "MaxxCasting".) The applications, which were opposed by a subsidiary of Evanov Communications, were denied in September 2023, on the grounds that they would have constituted a "service expansion" beyond the station's current licensed area.

=== New Country 93.5 (2024-present) ===
On August 29, 2024, at 10 a.m., CFXJ dropped the Today Radio format, with Stingray citing an inability to grow its audience. The station then began stunting with a playlist of country music hits, interspersed with sweepers teasing an official launch of a country format at 6 a.m. on September 3; at that time, the station officially relaunched as New Country 93.5. Its branding is shared with other Stingray-owned country stations. Some of the airstaff from the Today Radio format was maintained, particularly afternoon host Vanessa Newman, and former CMT personality Paul McGuire (who moved to mornings; McGuire hosts a networked show for the other New Country stations). Evenings feature The Casey Clarke Show from Penticton sister station CIGV-FM, hosted by the former CMT personality.

The flip gave Toronto its first in-market country music station since 1999, when CISS flipped to CHR. Its main competition are rimshot stations out of Ajax (CJKX-FM), Hamilton (CHKX-FM), and Newmarket (CKDX-FM).
