= Circle Square =

Canadian children's television series

- Genre: Children
- Written by: Jana Lyn Rutledge
- Directed by: John Spalding
- Starring: Reynold Rutledge; Blair Stewart; Sabrina Paul
- Opening theme: "Circle Square Theme"
- Ending theme: "Circle Square Theme"
- Composers: Carl Merenick; Ann Hilsden; Bruce Stacey; Jana Rutledge
- Country of origin: Canada
- Original language: English
- No. of seasons: 12
- No. of episodes: 165

Production
- Executive producer: David Mainse
- Producer: Maggie Spalding
- Cinematography: John Luscombe; Dan Marritt; George McEachern; Steve Faul
- Camera setup: Multi-camera
- Running time: 22 minutes
- Production company: Crossroads Christian Communications

Original release
- Network: Syndicated
- Release: April 15, 1974 – October 24, 1986

Circle Square is a Canadian children's television series that ran from 1974 to 1986. Crossroads Christian Communications produced the series in cooperation with its Circle Square Ranch network of summer camps for children. Circle Square Ranches, founded by Crossroads, are Christian-based non-profit camps.

== Overview ==
Mixing human actors—both youth and adult counsellors—with puppets in a Sesame Street-like manner, the series was set at a Circle Square Ranch library. Each episode taught a lesson in moral values.

== Characters ==
These were the main ongoing characters in the series; the children featured on the show tended to rotate through too quickly to establish an ongoing presences on the show.

- Durk (Reynold Rutledge): a kindly, grandfather-like figure. He is the library's maintenance man, and in every episode, the kids come to him with problems. Durk answers these problems with a story, which often features the real kid facing a similar problem.
- Vince (actor unknown): a furry white dog-like puppet character with a straight, rounded nose and a little work hat. He is Durk's assistant and companion, and is frequently seen with him. Vince mostly speaks gibberish, but he can say short little words like "uh-oh" and "uh-huh". His predecessor was a parrot named Polly.
- Gert and Egbert (Blair Stewart and Sabrina Paul): the main puppet characters, Gert and Egbert (a librarian and her assistant, respectively) help provide questions and thoughts (but mostly comic relief) for the segments at the library with the kids. Gert is the scatter-brained, overly-worried, patronizing of the pair, while Egbert is childish, goofy, and dumb. Gert and Egbert's puppets had exaggerated features and silly looks during the show's starting season. But as Gert and Egbert started to mature (only a little bit), their puppets were replaced with new figures whose appearances were less silly and more basic. The old Gert puppet disappeared into oblivion, but the old Egbert puppet managed to spend the rest of his days as a puppet character for the stories.

== Broadcast and syndication ==
The series was syndicated to television stations in Canada, the United States and Jamaica, often airing in a weekend slot on stations that also aired Crossroads' 100 Huntley Street. Reruns of 1984-1986 episodes of Circle Square were shown Saturday mornings on the Trinity Broadcasting Network (TBN) until late 2005 or early 2006, and episodes of the original Circle Square program can be viewed on the Circle Square Ranch website.

== Proposed revival ==
In 2003, a pilot for a new version of Circle Square called Circle Square Network (CSN) was produced by Crossroads, but was never picked up.
