= CKCS =

CKCS may refer to:

- CKCS-TV, a television station (channel 32) licensed to Calgary, Alberta, Canada
- Cavalier King Charles Spaniel, a small British breed of dog
