= CTSC =

CTSC may refer to:

- Cathepsin C, a protein encoded by the CTSC gene
- CKCS-TV, a Calgary television station branded as CTS Calgary
