= Operation Black Vote =

British not-for-profit national organisation

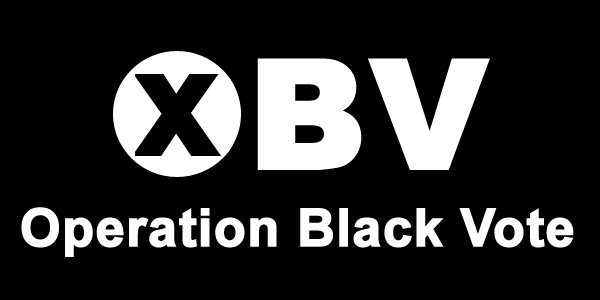
- Abbreviation: OBV
- Formation: 1996; 30 years ago
- Leader: Lord Woolley of Woodford CBE
- Website: www.obv.org.uk

Operation Black Vote (OBV) is a British non-partisan and nonprofit national organisation established in 1996, which addresses the Black British and ethnic minority democratic deficit. OBV uses voter registration campaigns in minority ethnic communities, and encourages community engagement in minority ethnic communities to address supposed racial inequalities in areas including education, health, and employment.

The current director of the OBV is Simon Woolley.

== Background ==
The New York-based Human Rights Watch identified Britain as the country with the highest incidence of racial attacks in Europe. Research at Southampton University by law professor Lawrence Lustgarden showed that Britain jails more Black people per head of population than the US.

In early 1996, with the last date for a General Election 18 months away, Black volunteers at Charter88 and activists at The 1990 Trust began exploring ways of using the most important event in Britain's political calendar to raise the concerns of the Black community. OBV began by collating political and demographic data in marginal constituencies, and soon realised that the Black vote was potentially immensely powerful. In more than 50 seats the number of African, Asian and Caribbean voters was greater than its marginality. In another 50, Black numbers were such that OBV had the potential to play a significant role in any closely fought contest.

A call to action would have a solid base and an immediate focus: the power of the Black vote at the coming general election. The challenge was to persuade the Black community to recognise that power and inspire them to participate – and to serve notice on the political parties that they ignored the Black electorate at their peril. Operation Black Vote was launched in July 1996. In 10 months, OBV held more than 100 meetings at schools, colleges, community centres, local party offices and town halls up and down the country. OBV distributed more than 250,000 voter registration cards; 500,000 leaflets in six different languages, and 50,000 posters. Simon Woolley joined OBV in 1997 as its first director.

In comparison to any election before 1997, the positive attention the Black electorate received from the major parties was unprecedented. In a speech made on 18 January 1997 at the Commonwealth Institute in London, the then Prime Minister John Major said: "There is much still to be done. I don’t pretend that the prospects for the young black man in Brixton are yet as open to talent as it is to the young white man in the Home Counties. It clearly isn't. But we must try and make it so." Liberal Democrats leader Paddy Ashdown pledged to make the House of Commons more representatives, and described it as "a white, male, middle-class club", and Tony Blair emphasised his lifetime commitment "to fight against racism".

At constituency level, MPs and candidates across the country took part in OBV Question Time meetings. For the first time in British political history, every candidate OBV invited came to listen to the Black electorate and argue their case.

== OBV's work ==
Operation Black Vote's work covers four main areas:

- Political education: to raise awareness and understanding of democratic and civic society through citizenship projects.
- Political participation: to improve general civic society engagement through local and national voter registration and other civic participation campaigns.
- Political representation: to increase political representation of Black and minority ethnic communities, through encouraging engagement; undertaking ground-breaking mentoring schemes; lobbying political parties and civic institutions on the benefits of representative bodies.
- Equality promotion and political representation: to increase political representation of Black and ethnic minorities in Britain through empowering individuals to engage in both democratic and civic society, lobbying political parties to increase BME political representations and addressing issues of race equality.

== Awards, nominations and accolades ==
- Winner of the Channel 4 Political Award, 2008
- Nominated for Channel 4 Political Award (February 2007)
- Supporting Local Democracy Award (March 2006)
- The Black Women in Business Award (BIBA), 2006, awarded to Winsome-Grace Cornish for OBV's Shadowing Schemes in the Ethnic Organisation category
- Best Campaign (January 2005)
- Men & Women of Merit award (September 2003)
- The African Caribbean Positive Image Foundation awarded OBV the Bernie Grant Award, 2002
- OBV's Director Simon Woolley was voted onto the Big Issue′s top 100 "Grassroots Power List 2002"
- Website of the Year Award, 2001–02

== Operation Black Vote Canada ==
OBV Canada is a separately incorporated non-profit established in 2004. The organization works to "educate, promote, and support Black Canadians' participation in the political process at all levels". It was founded by Bromley Armstrong, Denham Jolly, Delores Lawrence, Eva R. Lloyd, and Cynthia Reyes. Operation Black Vote Canada applied for a Canadian Federal program to support Black community initiatives, and was rejected for not being led by enough Black individuals, despite the fact that the organizations leadership is solely Black.
