= Milestone Radio =

Radio broadcasting company

Milestone Radio, Inc. was a radio broadcasting company headquartered in Toronto, Ontario, Canada. They were the first broadcasting company in Canada that was owned and operated by Black Canadians. The company's president was Denham Jolly.

== Company history ==
The company was founded in 1988 by five prominent individuals in Toronto's black community. After two attempts to obtain a license, which saw the group controversially passed over in favour of existing radio services, the group finally received a license from the CRTC in 2000 to launch the country's first R&B/hip-hop outlet, CFXJ-FM - branded as "Flow 93.5", which signed on the air in 2001.

Slaight Communications was a minority investor in the company; this ownership stake was not part of the company's 2007 sale of its broadcasting assets to Astral Media.

In 2003, the company teamed up with CHUM Limited to obtain a license for a Rhythmic Top 40 station in Edmonton, Alberta. That station, CHBN-FM, made its debut on February 17, 2005. CHBN-FM has since moved to mainstream top 40 since December 2005, and CHUM's stake in the station was transferred to CTVglobemedia when that company acquired CHUM Limited in 2007.

CHUM Radio, a division of CTVglobemedia (now Bell Media Radio) had acquired CFXJ which was approved by the CRTC on December 23, 2010. and was finalized in February 2011, ending Milestone's foray into radio ownership. That same year, CKFG-FM - on-air as "G98.7", founded by Fitzroy Gordon, was launched that October.

Two years later, CFXJ was resold to Newcap Radio as Bell Media acquired the assets of Astral Media. The station, now owned by Stingray Radio, was rebranded to "93.5 Today Radio" in February 2022, whilist CKFG was relaunched as "Flow 98.7" by new owners CINA Radio Group, who acquired the station in 2021.
