= Jayne Meadows filmography =

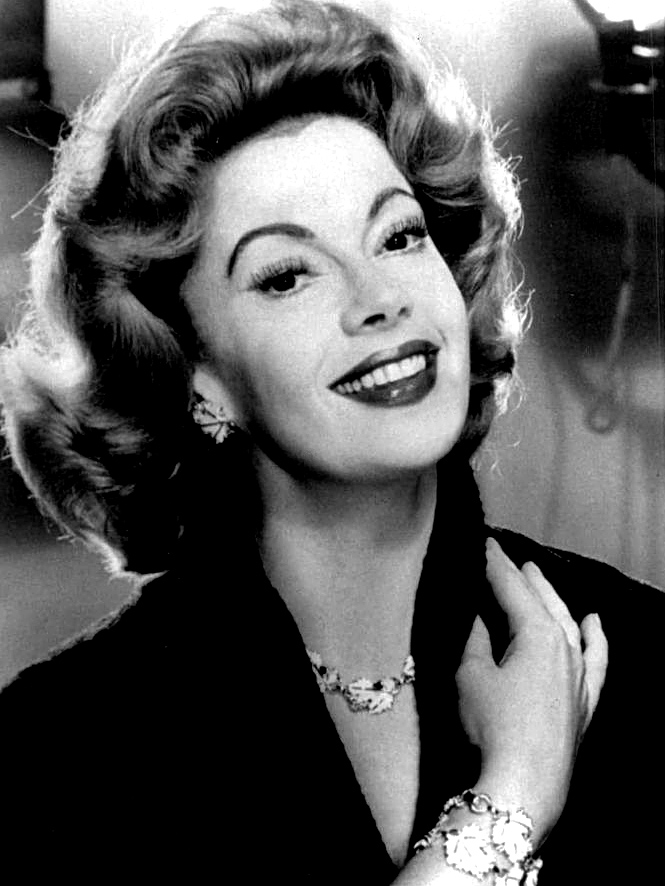
Jayne Meadows in 1985

This is the complete filmography of actress Jayne Meadows (September 27, 1919 – April 26, 2015)

== Film and television appearances ==
- 1946: Undercurrent as Sylvia Lea Burton
- 1946: Lady in the Lake as Mildred Havelend
- 1947: Dark Delusion as Mrs. Selkirk
- 1947: Song of the Thin Man as Janet Thayar
- 1948: The Luck of the Irish as Frances Augur
- 1948: Enchantment as Selina Dane
- 1951: The Fat Man as Jane Adams
- 1951: David and Bathsheba as Michal
- 1952: Robert Montgomery Presents (TV Series)
- 1952: Woman with a Sword (TV Movie) as Anna Ella Carroll
- 1952: Pulitzer Prize Playhouse (TV Series)
- 1952: Kraft Theatre (TV Series)
- 1952–1953: Danger (TV Series)
- 1953: Suspense (TV Series) as Helen Brady
- 1953: The Web (TV Series)
- 1954: Ponds Theater (TV Series)
- 1955: The United States Steel Hour (TV Series) as Cora
- 1955: Jane Wyman Presents The Fireside Theatre (TV Series) as Alice
- 1956: Studio One in Hollywood (TV Series) as Leslie
- 1957–1963: The Red Skelton Hour (TV Series) as Mrs. Cavendish / Gloria Dalton / Ruby / Ruthie / Clem's Greedy Relative
- 1959: It Happened to Jane as herself
- 1959: The Ann Sothern Show (TV Series) as Liza Vincent
- 1960: College Confidential as Betty Duquesne
- 1960: General Electric Theater (TV Series) as Jean Fletcher
- 1962: The DuPont Show of the Week (TV Series) as Myra
- 1964: The Eleventh Hour (TV Series) as Mrs. Bredan
- 1968: Good Morning World (TV Series) as Mary Margaret
- 1968: Now You See It, Now You Don't (TV Movie) as Ida
- 1969: The Outsider (TV Series) as Lil
- 1969: Here Come the Brides (TV Series) as Eleanor Tangiers
- 1969–1972: Medical Center (TV Series) as Nurse Chambers
- 1970: Love, American Style (TV Series) as Tana Wright (segment "Love and the Many Married Couple")
- 1970: Here's Lucy (TV Series) as Laura Trenton
- 1972: The New Temperatures Rising Show (TV Series) as Miss Brandon
- 1973: Adam-12 (TV Series) as Ida Huntington
- 1974: The Girl with Something Extra (TV Series) as Mrs. Elkins
- 1974: Witness to Yesterday (TV Series) as Cleopatra
- 1976: James Dean (TV Movie) as Reva Randall
- 1976: Norman... Is That You? as Adele Hobart
- 1976: The Practice (TV Series) as Mrs. Milnor
- 1976: The Nancy Walker Show (TV Series) as Georgia
- 1977: Switch (TV Series) as Andrea
- 1977: Sex and the Married Woman (TV Movie) as Irma Caddish
- 1977: Have I Got a Christmas for You (TV Movie) as Rita
- 1977–1981: Meeting of Minds (TV Series) as Catherine the Great / Margaret Sanger / Florence Nightingale / Dark Lady of the Sonnets / Elizabeth Barrett Browning / Marie Antoinette / Cleopatra
- 1978–1987: The Love Boat (TV Series) as Jayne Meadows / Janice / Mrs. Tate / Gwen Finley / Gertrude Benson / Myrna Foster
- 1979: The Paper Chase (TV Series) as Marian Chandler
- 1979: Project U.F.O. (TV Series) as Marlene Baker
- 1979: Hawaii Five-O (TV Series) as Jessica Humboldt
- 1979–1983: Fantasy Island (TV Series) as Margaret Wharton / Beatrice Solomon / Contessa / Liz Merrill / Nadine Winslow
- 1980: Tenspeed and Brown Shoe (TV Series) as Ruth LaCross
- 1980: The Gossip Columnist (TV Movie) as Jayne Meadows
- 1980–1982: Trapper John, M.D. (TV Series) as Melissa / Edwina Garth
- 1981: Rise and Shine (TV Series) as Mrs. Moffett
- 1981: Aloha Paradise (TV Series)
- 1982: Miss All-American Beauty (TV Movie) as Gertrude Hunnicutt
- 1982–1983: It's Not Easy (TV Series, Recurring role) as Ruth Long
- 1983: Matt Houston (TV Series) as Holly Harkens
- 1985: Hotel (TV Series) as Fran Clark
- 1985: Da Capo as Mrs. Thomas
- 1985: Alice in Wonderland (TV Movie) as The Queen of Hearts
- 1986: Murder, She Wrote (TV Series) as Lila Lee Amberson
- 1986: A Masterpiece of Murder (TV Movie) as Matilda Hussey
- 1986: Crazy Like a Fox (TV Series)
- 1987–1988: St. Elsewhere (TV Series, Recurring role) as Olga Osoranski
- 1989: Parent Trap: Hawaiian Honeymoon (TV Movie) as Charlotte Brink
- 1990: Murder by Numbers as Pamela
- 1990: The Jackie Bison Show (TV Series) as Mrs. St. Fawn
- 1991: City Slickers as Mitch's Mom
- 1991: Square One Television (TV Series) as Lady Esther Astor Astute
- 1991: Mathnet (TV Series) as Lady Esther Astor Astute
- 1992: The Player as herself
- 1993: Sisters (TV Series) as Ida Benbow
- 1993: For Goodness Sake (Short)
- 1994: Tom (TV Series) as Marianne
- 1994: City Slickers II: The Legend of Curly's Gold as Mitch's Mother
- 1995: Casino as herself
- 1995–1996: High Society (TV Series, Recurring role) as Alice Morgan
- 1997: The Nanny (TV Series) as herself
- 1998: Homicide: Life on the Street (TV Series) as Mrs. Cochran
- 1999: Diagnosis Murder (TV Series) as Connie Masters
- 1999: The Story of Us as Dot (final film role)
