= Cynthia Reyes =

Canadian author and former CBC executive producer

- Born: Cynthia Sharon Reyes; Jamaica
- Occupation: Author
- Writing career
- Genres: Memoir, children's literature
- Notable works: A Good Home; An Honest House; Twigs in My Hair; Myrtle the Purple Turtle
- Notable awards: African Canadian Achievement Award (1998); Crystal Award (2003); CBC President's Award; Children's Broadcast Institute Award; Order of Distinction (Jamaica) (2016)
- Website: cynthiasreyes.com

Cynthia Reyes is a Jamaican-born Canadian author and former journalist and executive producer with the Canadian Broadcasting Corporation.

== Early life and education ==
Reyes, born Cynthia Sharon Reyes, spent her early years in rural Jamaica before relocating to Canada.

Cynthia Reyes graduated from Ryerson (now Toronto Metropolitan University) in 1979. She earned a Bachelor of Arts in Journalism.

After apprenticing at the Canadian Broadcasting Corporation, she joined her father in Florida to help with the family business centered on thoroughbred racing. She chose to pursue journalism after colleagues suggested she was unsuited for racetrack life.

== Career ==
Cynthia Reyes became the first Black female television reporter at CBC in Toronto in 1980. During her work as a junior reporter at CBC TV, she was the only Black person in the Toronto newsroom.

Reyes, then working as a journalist, participated in the first Harry Jerome Awards committee, a Black Business and Professional Association initiative, in 1983. A few years later, she served as president of the Black Business and Professional Association (BBPA). At the 1985 election for the BBPA, she opposed Denham Jolly as a candidate in the race for BBPA president.

Reyes was promoted at CBC by 1989 to executive producer of journalism training and development, responsible for training personnel across all CBC information programming.

She was involved in the efforts that led to the founding of the Canadian Association of Black Journalists in 1996.

Reyes worked as a senior journalist at CBC and as executive producer of children's programming in Canada. She later led post-apartheid television journalism initiatives in South Africa and served as Secretary General of the International Public Television Screening Conference in Europe.

She concluded her work with CBC in 2000. Her career at the organization lasted two decades. Her programs have aired in over one hundred episodes on network television.

That year, Reyes persuaded her husband, CBC reporter and anchor Hamlin Grange, to join her in founding Pro Media International, a training and consulting firm specializing in diversity management. The company created a diversity plan for CTV that was later used by the Canadian Radio-television and Telecommunications Commission (CRTC) as a model for licensing conditions for other networks. The pair co-founded Innoversity, a nonprofit linking media executives and talent from varied cultural backgrounds. Reyes, together with Grange, established the annual Innoversity Creative Summit in 2001 to confront the lack of diversity in mainstream media.

On November 22, 2005, she helped launch Operation Black Vote Canada in Toronto. She was appointed as a board member alongside Denham Jolly, Hamlin Grange, Willoughby Edwards, and Bromley Armstrong.

A 2005 rear-end collision impacted her life when it caused injuries to her foot, leg, and back, resulting in chronic pain and long-term consequences.

After her time in television, she pursued writing, producing short stories and books. Her writing has appeared in the Globe and Mail, Toronto Star, Toronto Life, and Arabella Magazine.

In 2017, Reyes published Myrtle the Purple Turtle, a bedtime story she first told to her then four-year-old daughter in 1990. Reyes co-authored later volumes of the award-winning children's book series with her daughter, Lauren Reyes-Grange. Titles include Myrtle's Game, Myrtle Makes a New Friend, Myrtle and the Big Mistake, and Vertu la tortue violette.

== Personal life ==
She and her husband, Hamlin Grange, have two daughters, Nikisha Reyes-Grange and Lauren Reyes-Grange.

== Awards and honours ==
Reyes was awarded the 2003 Crystal Award for "Outstanding Achievement" in Film and Television.

Canadian Women in Communication named Reyes its 2006 Trailblazer of the Year. The award was presented in Ottawa on February 27, 2007.

At the 27th annual Harry Jerome Awards ceremony held in 2010, she was recognized as an original member of the event's first committee, alongside Al Mercury, Al Hamilton, Hamlin Grange, Hon. Jean Augustine, Bromley Armstrong, Pamela Appelt, Denham Jolly, and Kamala Jean Gopie.

The Government of Jamaica awarded her the Order of Distinction, Commander rank, in 2016, for her "outstanding contribution to journalism internationally."

She also won the Children's Broadcast Institute Award.

== Works ==
- A Good Home: A Memoir (2013)
- An Honest House: A Memoir, Continued (2016)
- Myrtle the Purple Turtle (2017)
- Twigs in my Hair (2019)
