= CITL =

CITL may represent:

- CITL-TV, a television station in Lloydminster, Alberta/Saskatchewan
- An acronym for CIT Laurentides
