= Omni Alberta =

Omni Alberta may refer to the following affiliates of the Omni Television system:

- CJCO-DT Calgary
- CJEO-DT Edmonton
