= Crossroads Christian Communications =

Canadian non-profit charitable corporation

Crossroads Christian Communications Inc.
- Formation: 1962
- Founder: David Mainse
- Type: Nonprofit
- Headquarters: Burlington, Ontario, Canada
- Chief executive officer: Kevin Shepherd
- Website: crossroads.ca

Crossroads Christian Communications Inc. is a Canadian non-profit charitable corporation based in Burlington, Ontario. Its flagship television program, 100 Huntley Street, was founded by David Mainse and is the longest running daily Christian television program in Canada. Crossroads interacts with its viewers via 24/7 prayer lines, and it has also been a not-for-profit aid agency for over 25 years, having responded in times of natural disaster worldwide, raising funds and partnering with on-site, non-government organizations for emergency relief and long-term rebuilding strategies.

== Media Group ==
=== Broadcasting and distribution ===
- Yes TV
  - Calgary – CKCS
  - Edmonton – CKES
  - Hamilton/Greater Toronto Area – CITS
    - Ottawa – CITS-1
    - London – CITS-2
- Tricord Media
- Castle

=== TV and online broadcasts ===
- 100 Huntley Street
- Circle Square (1974–1986 television program for children)
- See Hear Love (with Melinda Estabrooks)
- Hey Meisha! (children's programming)
- A Better Us (with Ron and Ann Mainse)
- Young Once
- 100 Words by David Mainse

== Ministries ==
- 24/7 Prayer Center
- Relief and Development
