= CKSA-DT =

Television station in Lloydminster (1960–2025)

Lloydminster, Alberta–Saskatchewan; Canada
- Channels: Digital: 2 (VHF); Virtual: 2
- Branding: CKSA

Programming
- Affiliations: CBC (1960–2016); Global (2016–2021); Citytv (2021–2025)

Ownership
- Owner: Stingray Group; (Stingray Radio Inc.)
- Sister stations: CKSA-FM, CILR-FM, CITL-DT

History
- First air date: September 23, 1960
- Last air date: May 13, 2025; (64 years, 232 days)
- Former call signs: CHSA-TV (1960–1963), CKSA-TV (1963–2011)
- Former channel number(s): Analogue: 2 (VHF, 1960–2011)
- Call sign meaning: Saskatchewan and Alberta (taken from sister radio station)

Technical information
- Licensing authority: CRTC
- ERP: 8.1 kW
- HAAT: 220.6 m (724 ft)
- Transmitter coordinates: 53°23′47″N 110°0′30″W
- Translator(s): see § Transmitters

Links
- Website: cksatv.ca

CKSA-DT (channel 2) was a Citytv-affiliated television station in Lloydminster, a city located on the border of the Canadian provinces of Alberta and Saskatchewan. It was owned by Stingray Radio alongside CTV affiliate CITL-DT (channel 4). The two stations shared studios at 50 Street and 51 Avenue on the Alberta side of Lloydminster; CKSA-DT's transmitter was located near Highway 17 and Township Road 512, near the Saskatchewan provincial line.

== History ==
From its launch through 2016, CKSA was an affiliate of CBC Television, and was that network's last remaining privately owned affiliate.

=== Switch to Global ===
On May 24, 2016, the Canadian Radio-television and Telecommunications Commission (CRTC) published an application by then-owner Newcap to disaffiliate the station from CBC Television effective August 31 of that year, claiming that the public broadcaster had elected not to renew any of its affiliations with private stations beyond that date. Newcap indicated that it would seek programming from another supplier, without saying whether such alternate programming had been found. On September 1, 2016, CKSA switched to Global. Newcap merged with Stingray Group in 2018.

Following the February 2016 switch of British Columbia outlets CJDC-TV in Dawson Creek and CFTK-TV in Terrace to CTV 2, CKSA-DT was the only privately owned CBC Television affiliate remaining in the system.

=== Switch to Citytv ===
In December 2021, CKSA disaffiliated from Global and began airing network programming from Citytv.

CKSA, along with sister CITL, signed off every night, and did not air Citytv's overnight programming, as both stations had the Canadian national anthem "O Canada" played during the sign-off.

=== Shutdown ===
On May 13, 2025, Stingray Radio announced that CKSA and CITL had ceased operations effective immediately, citing "challenging economic conditions" and "careful consideration of the evolving media landscape and the challenges facing local television broadcasting". On July 18, 2025, CKSA-DT had its licence revoked by the CRTC.

== Newscasts ==
As of September 4, 2018, CKSA broadcast five hours of local news each week. Prime Time Local News aired at 6 p.m. on weekdays and was simulcast with CITL; there was no local news on weekends. Under its previous affiliation with Global, all newscasts from Global Edmonton/CITV-DT were simulcast on CKSA, except for Global News at 5 and the weekday editions of Global National.

The station previously broadcast Newcap News at 5 p.m., followed by Global National at 5:30 p.m. from the start of its Global affiliation until August 31, 2018. On September 4, 2018, the program was expanded to one hour on CKSA, reformatted from a traditional newscast to a news magazine, and re-branded as Prime Time Local News. Global National was only seen on weekends on CKSA preceding Global News Hour at 6 up until its disaffiliation.

Beginning in December 2021, after the switch to Citytv, Prime Time Local News was moved to 6 p.m., and a re-broadcast was added the following morning at 7 a.m. The weeknight 11 p.m. edition, weekend 6 and 11 p.m. editions, and the 6 a.m. re-broadcast of CityNews Edmonton were also aired on CKSA.

== Transmitters ==
| Station | City of licence | Channel | ERP | HAAT | Transmitter coordinates |
|---|---|---|---|---|---|
| CKSA-TV-2 | Bonnyville, AB | 9 (VHF) | 41.5 kW | 195.1 m | 54°11′54″N 110°50′31″W |

CKSA was also broadcast on CKSA-TV-3 channel 8 in Wainwright and CKSA-TV-4 channel 12 in Provost, until they ceased operations on August 31, 2011. It was also rebroadcast on CBCS-TV-1 channel 8, an analog rebroadcaster of CKSA in Meadow Lake, Saskatchewan owned by the CBC; this repeater closed on July 31, 2012, as part of the CBC's austerity measures to keep the corporation solvent and in operation.

Former transmitters
| Station | City of licence | Channel | ERP | HAAT | Transmitter coordinates |
|---|---|---|---|---|---|
| CKSA-TV-3 | Wainwright, AB | 8 (VHF) | 0.009 kW | NA | 52°51′11″N 110°48′6″W |
| CKSA-TV-4 | Provost, AB | 12 (VHF) | 0.009 kW | NA | 52°22′10″N 110°10′19″W |
| CBCS-TV-1 | Meadow Lake, SK | 8 (VHF) | 21.9 kW | 227.4 m | 53°53′8″N 108°24′35″W |
