= CITS-DT =

Television station in Hamilton, Ontario

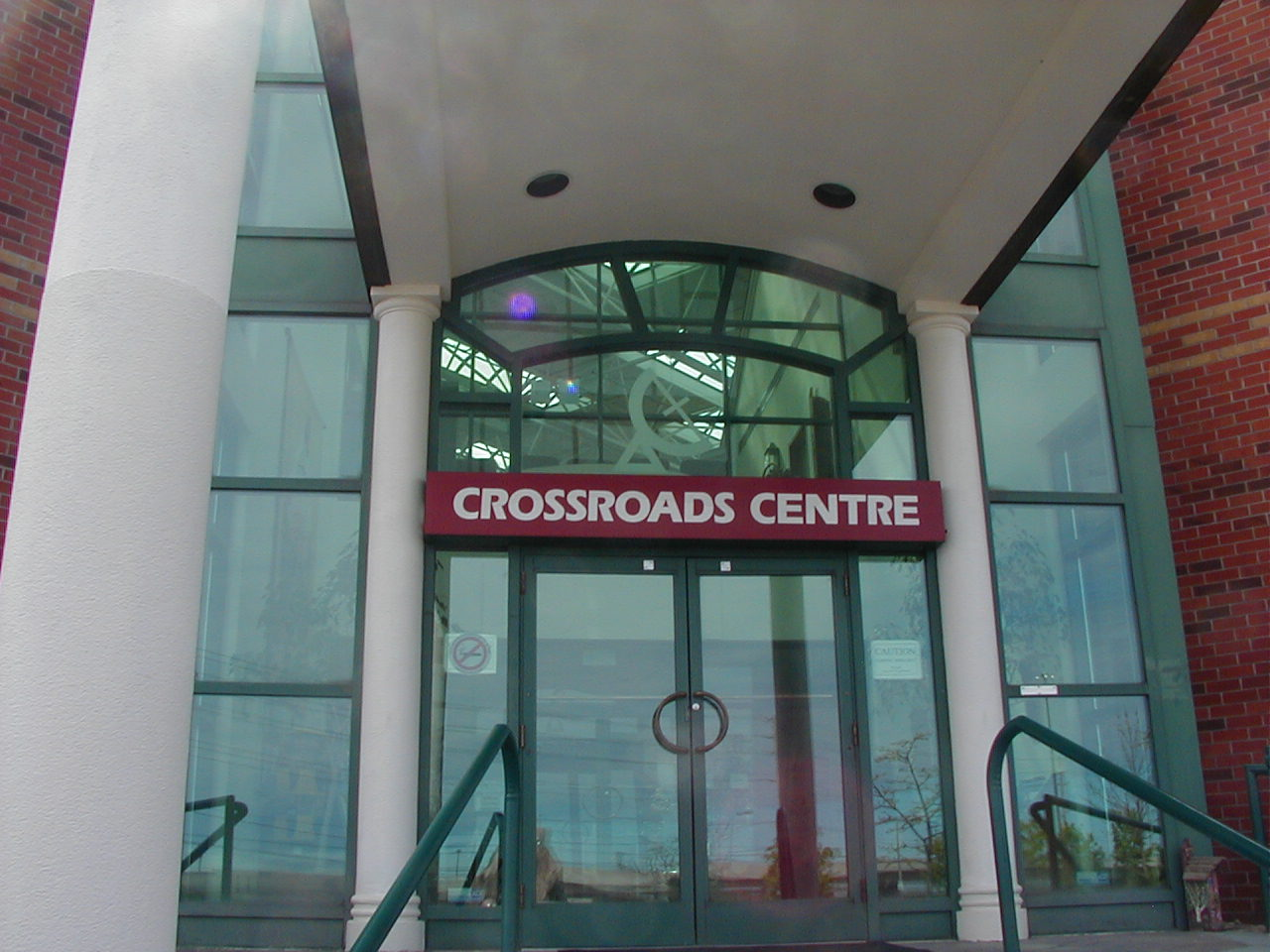
- Crossroads Centre located in Burlington, home of CTS studios
- Hamilton–Toronto, Ontario; Canada
- City: Hamilton, Ontario
- Channels: Digital: 14 (UHF); Virtual: 14
- Branding: Yes TV Ontario

Programming
- Affiliations: 14.1: Yes TV

Ownership
- Owner: Crossroads Christian Communications; (Crossroads Television System)

History
- First air date: October 1, 1998
- Former call signs: CITS-TV (1998–2011)
- Former channel numbers: Analog: 36 (UHF, 1998–2011); Digital: 35 (UHF, 2008–2011), 36 (UHF, 2011–2019)
- Former affiliations: Independent (1998–2007)
- Call sign meaning: Crossroads Independent Television System

Technical information
- Licensing authority: CRTC
- ERP: 691.3 kW
- HAAT: 337 m (1,106 ft)
- Transmitter coordinates: 43°18′9.8″N 79°57′35.3″W
- Translator(s): see § Transmitters

Links
- Website: www.yestv.com

CITS-DT (channel 14) is a religious television station in Hamilton, Ontario, Canada, serving as the flagship station of Yes TV. Owned by Crossroads Christian Communications, the station has studios on North Service Road (adjacent to Highway 403) in Burlington, and its transmitter is located on Highway 5 near Millgrove Side Road in Dundas, Ontario.

CITS-DT also operates rebroadcasters in Ottawa and London, extending the station's coverage to almost all of Southern Ontario as well as portions of Western New York.

== History ==
On December 4, 1996, the Canadian Radio-television and Telecommunications Commission (CRTC) denied Crossroads Christian Communications a licence to operate a religious television station in Burlington. Two years later on April 9, 1998, the company became successful in obtaining a licence for Hamilton, beating out Trinity Television Inc. for the licence. CITS-TV first signed on the air on October 1 of that year, as a religious independent station. It had planned to launch two weeks earlier on September 14, but the sign-on date was pushed back to allow cable providers to make changes to some of their channel designations.

Throughout the years, CITS-TV expanded its coverage across southern Ontario by adding rebroadcast transmitters in London and Ottawa and by securing carriage on various cable providers across Ontario and Canada and on satellite.

CTS was rebranded as "Yes TV" on September 1, 2014. The rebranding coincides with the introduction of several secular programs into the schedule such as American Idol, Wheel of Fortune and Jeopardy!.

== Programming ==
Yes TV airs programming intended for family viewing, mostly based on Christian values, including dramas, comedies, mini-series and reality, game, and talk shows; although Yes TV also features shows on political commentary and other religions, including Judaism, Islam and Sikhism. Yes TV also airs secular mainstream programs during prime time hours. It is governed by the CRTC's Religious Broadcast Regulations and follows a policy of not airing shows containing "coarse language, gratuitous violence or explicit sexual scenes".

Most syndicated programs are timed to air on CITS for maximum simultaneous substitution benefits to coincide with the timing of the airings in the nearest American market, Buffalo, New York.

== Technical information ==
=== Subchannel ===
Subchannel of CITS-DT
Subchannel	Res.	Short name	Programming
14.1	1080i	CITS-HD	Yes TV

=== Analog-to-digital conversion ===
CITS-TV began broadcasting its digital signal on UHF channel 35 in January 2008. CITS shut down its analog signal, over UHF channel 36, on August 31, 2011, the official date on which Canadian television stations in CRTC-designated mandatory markets transitioned from analog to digital broadcasts; The station relocated its digital signal from its pre-transition UHF channel 35 to its former analog-era UHF channel 36 for post-transition operations. CITS and its digital rebroadcast transmitters switched to digital as follows: Ottawa repeater CITS-DT-1's digital signal remained on its pre-transition UHF channel 42, remapping to virtual channel 42.1; while London repeater CITS-DT-2's digital signal remained on UHF channel 14, remapping to virtual channel 14.1.

=== Spectrum reallocation ===
As part of the joint effort between the United States and Canada to repurpose the 600 MHz band, CITS-DT was required to change its broadcast frequencies in all three markets that it serves. On July 29, 2019, the Hamilton transmitter (CITS-DT) moved from UHF 36 to UHF 14, while the London transmitter (CITS-DT-2) moved from UHF 14 to UHF 19. On May 25, 2020, the Ottawa transmitter (CITS-DT-1) moved from UHF 42 to UHF 15. In all three cases, the virtual channel is identical to the physical channel, appended with the .1 decimal.

=== Transmitters ===
Station	City of licence	Channel (RF / VC)	ERP	HAAT	Transmitter coordinates
CITS-DT-1	Ottawa	15 (UHF); 15	20.6 kW	203.6 m (668 ft)	45°13′1″N 75°33′50″W
CITS-DT-2	London	19 (UHF); 19	4 kW	266.0 m (873 ft)	42°57′16″N 81°21′17″W
