= CKFG-FM =

Radio station in Toronto

Coordinates: 43.7496°N 79.3514°W

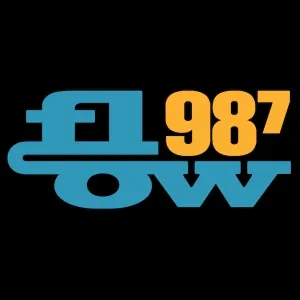
- Toronto, Ontario; Canada
- Broadcast area: Greater Toronto Area
- Frequency: 98.7 MHz
- Branding: Flow 98.7

Programming
- Format: Urban contemporary

Ownership
- Owner: CINA Media Group; (2784486 Ontario Ltd.)

History
- First air date: October 3, 2011
- Call sign meaning: Station founder Fitzroy Gordon

Technical information
- Licensing authority: CRTC
- Class: B1
- ERP: 446 watts (average); 1,000 watts (peak)
- HAAT: 276.6 metres (907 ft)

Links
- Webcast: Listen live
- Website: flow987.com

CKFG-FM (98.7 FM, Flow 98.7) is a radio station in Toronto, Ontario. Owned by CINA Media Group, it carries an urban contemporary format. The studios and offices are on Kern Road in the Don Mills neighbourhood of North York.

The station began broadcasting on October 3, 2011, as G98.7 under the ownership of Intercity Broadcasting Network–a company founded by Jamaican-Canadian broadcaster Fitzroy Gordon. The station launched with an urban adult contemporary format serving the Black Canadian community of Africans and Caribbeans in the Greater Toronto Area, airing a mix of R&B, soul, reggae, soca, hip hop, worldbeat, gospel, and smooth jazz.

After Gordon's death in 2019, it was revealed that the station had been accumulating debt. It subsequently entered receivership, and in 2020, an Ontario court ordered that CKFG be sold. CKFG would be acquired by Neeti P. Ray's CINA Media Group, an operator of multicultural stations, in September 2021. Its new owners committed to maintain CKFG's existing format; in February 2022, CINA announced an agreement with Stingray Radio to transfer the heritage Flow branding from CFXJ-FM to CKFG, as part of a relaunch of both stations.

The station has an effective radiated power (ERP) of 446 watts with a peak of 1,000 watts. Its transmitter is atop First Canadian Place in Downtown Toronto.

== Coverage area ==
While most commercial FM stations in Toronto broadcast at many thousands of watts, CKFG's signal is limited. It covers most of the city of Toronto, and extends towards Milton, Oakville, Brampton, Aurora, and Pickering. However, in the northeastern part of the GTA, particularly in the Scarborough area, reception of CKFG is often impacted by CBLA-FM's repeater in Peterborough.

To remedy this interference in Scarborough and in Durham Region, Intercity applied for a re-broadcaster on 102.7 MHz as part of the CRTC's call for applications of new radio stations in May 2014. The CRTC declined the request on November 5, 2014, and instead awarded a new license to East FM, who launched CJRK-FM on that frequency.

== History ==
=== Origins and early years ===
==== Founding ====
The station was founded by Fitzroy Gordon, a Jamaican-Canadian who immigrated to Canada in 1979. He became a late night disc jockey on CHIN Radio in the 1990s hosting a program aimed at the Caribbean community. The station was originally licensed by the Canadian Radio-television and Telecommunications Commission in 2006, but as the proposed 98.7 frequency was second adjacent to the Canadian Broadcasting Corporation's CBLA-FM, the approval was made conditional on the new station's owner, Fitzroy Gordon, submitting a revised application for a different frequency. Milestone Radio also filed an intervention, stating that the station's proposed format would compete with its own CFXJ (Flow 93.5)–which was the first urban contemporary station in Canada.

The station did not file a revised application, however, and the initial authorization lapsed; instead, Gordon subsequently reapplied for the same 98.7 frequency. Accordingly, Industry Canada allowed the station to broadcast a test signal for three weeks in 2010 to determine whether the frequency could be used without impacting CBLA. The test signal, a mix of reggae, R&B, hip hop, gospel and soca music, was branded as Caribbean African Radio Network, or CARN.

The test found no significant interference, and on June 9, 2011, Gordon's Intercity Broadcasting Network received CRTC approval to use the 98.7 frequency. The CBC again noted its objection to the licensing of a second-adjacent frequency; four commercial broadcast groups — Rogers Media, Astral Media, Bell Media and Durham Radio — also filed comments in support of the CBC's position. Gordon stated that the station's goal was to have at least a temporary signal on air in time for Caribana, but did not immediately confirm a permanent launch date. RadioInsight revealed on October 1 that the station would begin airing on October 3. On that day, the station officially signed on the air and changed monikers to G98.7.

G98.7 original logo

G98.7 secondary logo

==== On the air ====
On November 28, 2011, at 6 a.m., the station aired its first live broadcast with the song "I Can See Clearly Now" by Jimmy Cliff. Then founder Fitzroy Gordon said a prayer, before handing it over to morning hosts Mark Strong and Jemeni, both formerly of Flow 93.5. The station launched with an urban adult contemporary format serving the Black Canadian community of Africans and Caribbeans in the Greater Toronto Area, airing a mix of R&B, soul, reggae, soca, hip hop, Worldbeat, gospel, and smooth jazz. The station also planned to air local news and sports programming, as well as talk shows relating to the African and Caribbean communities.

Virtually during the same time CKFG-FM signed on the air, its rival CFXJ-FM flipped from rhythmic contemporary back to urban contemporary. Ironically, because there are no other R&B/Hip-Hop or Adult R&B outlets in Canada, the only major music chart CKFG reports to is the BDS Canadian Top 40 chart panel.

==== FM application and TV network ====
In 2012, Intercity Broadcasting was one of 27 applicants for the 88.1 frequency vacated by the revocation in early 2011 of CKLN-FM's license, applying to move CKFG-FM to the 88.1 frequency. The bid was unsuccessful and the CRTC awarded the frequency to CIND-FM.

On October 21, 2014, it was announced that Gordon was granted a licence by the CRTC to launch a national Black/Caribbean television station. It would have been the second Black Canadian television service after FEVA TV, which launched in August 2014 and targets African-Canadians.

=== Financial and ownership crisis; relaunch as Flow ===
Flow 98.7 original logo

Station CEO and founder Fitzroy Gordon died on April 30, 2019 at the age of 65. Soon after his death, shareholder and former chief financial officer Delford Blythe initiated court proceedings in an attempt to take financial control of the station, alleging significant mismanagement by Gordon which was threatening the station's survival. The station was put into receivership under A. Farber & Partners as a result. In 2019, the station reportedly owed over $200,000 to the Canada Revenue Agency (CRA), $138,000 to the CRTC, and "additional sums of more than $165,000 to creditors who have received judgments against the station." By 2020, debts were reported to be in excess of $2,000,000. In July 2020, the court ordered Intercity Broadcasting Network to sell the station. There were calls, including from Ontario Premier Doug Ford and Mayor of Toronto John Tory, that CKFG maintain its format and, if possible, remain Black-owned.

Eleven binding bids were received, although none of them involved Black-owned companies. In October 2020, Neeti P. Ray, owner of multicultural stations CINA in Mississauga and CINA-FM in Windsor, was named winner. Whiteoaks Communications Group, owner of religious station CJYE and multicultural station CJMR in Oakville, was named as a backup in the event that the CRTC did not approve an acquisition by CINA. A. Farber & Partners stated that Ray had an "acute understanding of the station’s position and importance to the community", and had therefore committed to continue operating CKFG as a station targeting the Black community.

The sale was completed in September 2021. CINA Media Group stated that it would maintain CKFG's format and positioning. Former iHeartMedia executive Gary Gunter, who has previously worked with hip-hop and R&B-formatted stations in the United States, was brought on as the station's new general manager. On February 9, 2022, Stingray Radio announced that it had reached an agreement with CINA Media Group to transfer the Flow branding from CFXJ-FM to CKFG, as part of a relaunch of both stations scheduled for February 14.

Stingray's vice president of brands and content Steve Jones stated that the company had wanted to "[bring] Flow back to its roots as a community-driven station" with a broader array of music, but after realizing that such a station would compete directly with CKFG, it instead pursued an agreement with the station to "keep the Flow brand–and mission–alive in Toronto". CKFG is being positioned as "Toronto's Hip Hop and R&B"—expanding its playlist to appeal to the younger demographics associated with CFXJ's urban contemporary format, while still maintaining the broader array of genres it played as G98.7. Gunter described the changes as a "reset" that would leverage the heritage of the Flow branding, and target the entirety of Toronto's Black community.

In anticipation of the relaunch, CKFG began a soft launch with a playlist of classic hip hop hits that afternoon, while CFXJ went jockless and released its airstaff. As scheduled, CKFG rebranded as Flow 98.7 on February 14, while CFXJ concurrently adopted a new adult hits format as 93.5 Today Radio.

In June 2026, the station underwent changes to its on-air lineup, including the addition of former CFXJ personalities Patricia J (co-hosting a new morning show with fellow CFXJ alumni Robert "Spex Da Boss" Lloyd) and former morning host Peter Kash (who became program director and afternoon host). At this time, the station also rebranded with a version of the original Flow logo used by CFXJ.
