= The 1990 Trust =

The 1990 Trust is the first UK national Black organisation set up to protect and pioneer the interest of Britain's Black Communities. Their approach is to engage in policy development and to articulate the needs of Black communities from a Black perspective.

Key figures in the organisation include Lee Jasper, David Weaver, Audrey Adams and Karen Chouhan. It works closely with the National Assembly Against Racism and Operation Black Vote.

The 1990 Trust uses the term 'Black' as a political term to refer to all people of African, Caribbean and Asian descent.

Its stated goals are:

- To establish and influence the practical implementation of the principle that 'Racism is a violation of human rights' for example via the monitoring and analysis of public policy and parliamentary legislation to assess the implications for and effects on the quality of life of Black communities and to keep Black communities informed of progress on these initiatives
- To establish an international reputation for excellence and innovation, as an exemplar organisation demonstrating the benefits of African, Asian, and Caribbean communities working collectively in tackling racism
- To develop self organisation and community leadership to empower Black communities in tackling racism and in reaching their full potential
