= CHDI-FM =

Radio station in Edmonton, Canada

- Edmonton, Alberta; Canada
- Broadcast area: Edmonton Metropolitan Region
- Frequency: 102.9 MHz
- Branding: SONiC 102.9

Programming
- Format: Modern rock

Ownership
- Owner: Rogers Radio; (Rogers Media, Inc.)
- Sister stations: CHBN-FM, CKEM-DT, CJEO-DT

History
- First air date: April 5, 2005

Technical information
- Class: C
- ERP: 100,000 watts horizontal 24,000 watts vertical
- HAAT: 272 metres (892 ft)
- Transmitter coordinates: 53°31′54.84″N 113°46′51.60″W

Links
- Website: sonic1029.com

CHDI-FM (102.9 MHz, Sonic 102.9) is a radio station in Edmonton, Alberta. Owned by Rogers Radio, a division of Rogers Sports & Media, it broadcasts a modern rock format. Its studios are co-located with its sister stations on Gateway Boulevard. While its transmitter is located near Yellowhead Highway/Highway 16A in Acheson.

As of February 28, 2021, CHDI is the 8th-most-listened-to radio station in the Edmonton market according to a PPM data report released by Numeris.

== History ==
The OK Radio Group Ltd. was granted this license in 2005 as one of three new FM stations in Edmonton.

The station spent its first year broadcasting from a run down oil-field trailer on the property of the Airways Country Inn in Nisku, Alberta. The station founders wanted to get the station on the air as quickly as possible so it was decided they would broadcast from the trailer until their Gateway Boulevard studios were complete. Local media latched on to their "pirate" story, giving them a huge shot in the arm in their first year. In November 2006, Rogers Media acquired CHDI, and sister station CKER-FM.

Since the station was launched in 2005, ratings have been steady around a 6.0 share, peaking at an 8.0 share, 4th place station in spring 2007, however CHDI dropped to a 4.8 share in fall 2008, making it the 10th most listened to station in Edmonton. Upon inception of the new BBM Canada radio ratings devices, the PPM (Personal People Meter), Sonic has held a steady 8.0 market share and a top 4 or 5 radio station in the Edmonton market. A fact many in the Edmonton market knew to be more accurate with the audience, based on Sonic's prevalence with the listeners.
