= Quanteisha =

Q-Benjamin
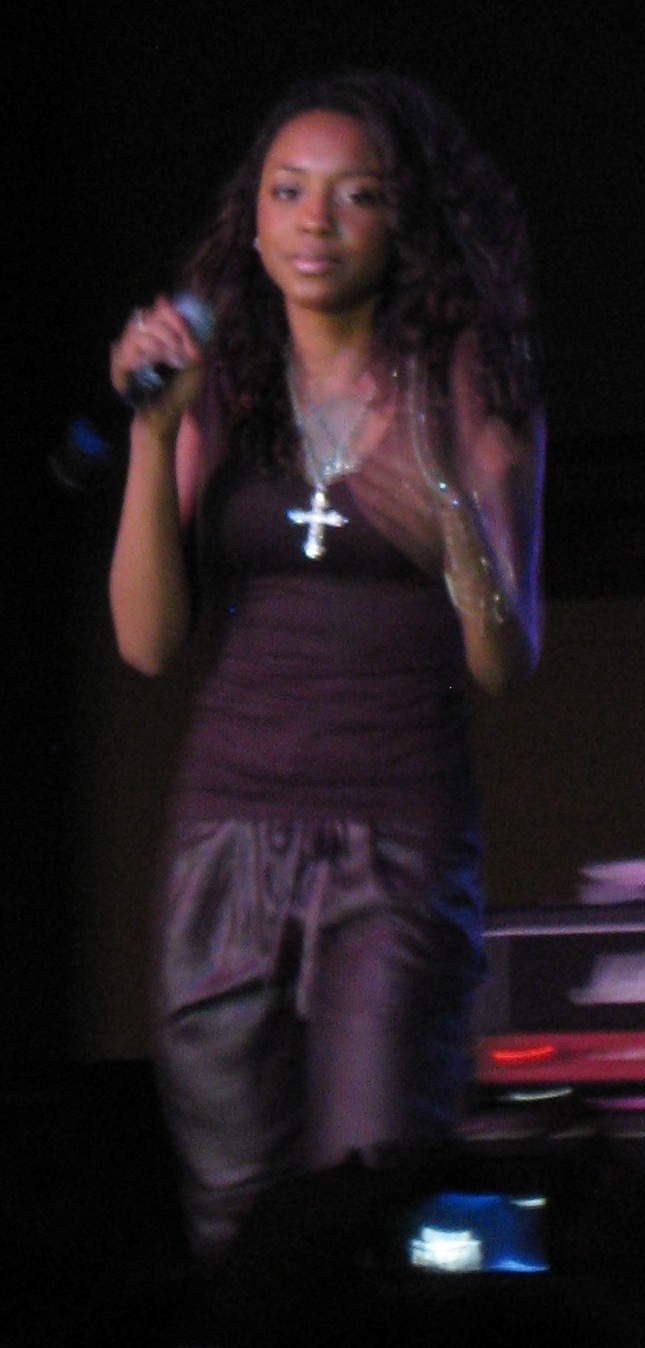
- Quanteisha performing at the Edmonton Expo Centre.

Background information
- Origin: Edmonton, Alberta, Canada
- Genres: R&B
- Occupation(s): Singer, Songwriter, Rapper
- Years active: 2008–present
- Labels: Unsigned

Quanteisha Benjamin, often referred to as Q-Benjamin, is a Canadian R&B singer.

== Early life ==
Quanteisha grew up in Edmonton, Alberta. In 2008 she entered the local singing competition Bounce Showdown, held by contemporary hit radio station 91.7 The Bounce (CHBN-FM), becoming the fourth winner.

== Singing career ==
After being signed with HipJoint Productions, out of Vancouver, Q recorded two songs in 2008, "Cover Girls" and "Get Loose". "Cover Girls" would get licensed for use on the sitcom 'da Kink in My Hair, and a music video. In 2009 she released "Someday" and "D'n'G", and "Someday" was used in the sitcom Gigantic. Also in 2009, a "Get Loose" remix was featured in the American Pie Presents: The Book of Love comedy film. Her single, "Stars", has won a Juno Award for R&B/Soul Recording of the Year.

== Discography ==
Discography for Q-Benjamin FKA Quanteisha.

=== Singles ===
Song	Album	Release date
"Get Loose"	Quanteisha	October 28, 2008
"Cover Girls"	Quanteisha	October 28, 2008
"Someday"	Someday	January 1, 2009
"Someday [Remix]"	Someday	January 1, 2009
"Get Loose - the Remix"	Get Loose the Remix	March 30, 2009
"D'n'G"	single	December 15, 2009
"Stars"	single	2010
"Use Me"	single	February 20, 2020
"Mic Drop"	single	March 27, 2020
"Somebody Son	single	May 22, 2020
"2020 Vision"	single	December 29, 2020
"New Ting"	single	January 22, 2021

=== Music videos ===
Song
"Cover Girls"

== Awards and nominations ==
Year	Nominee / work	Award	Result
2011	"D'n'G"	Canadian Radio Music Award for dance/urban/rhythmic song	Nominated
2011	"Stars"	Juno Award for R&B/soul recording of the year	Won
