= CITL-DT =

Television station in Lloydminster (1976–2025)

- Lloydminster, Alberta–Saskatchewan; Canada
- Channels: Digital: 4 (VHF); Virtual: 4
- Branding: CITL

Programming
- Affiliations: CTV (1976–2025)

Ownership
- Owner: Stingray Group; (Stingray Radio Inc.)
- Sister stations: CKSA-FM, CILR-FM, CKSA-DT

History
- First air date: July 28, 1976
- Last air date: May 13, 2025; (48 years, 289 days)
- Former call signs: CITL-TV (1976–2011)
- Former channel numbers: Analogue: 4 (VHF, 1976–2011)
- Call sign meaning: Television for Lloydminster

Technical information
- Licensing authority: CRTC
- ERP: 9.1 kW
- HAAT: 220.6 m (724 ft)
- Transmitter coordinates: 53°23′47″N 110°0′30″W
- Translator(s): see § Former transmitters

Links
- Website: citltv.ca

CITL-DT (channel 4) was a CTV-affiliated television station in Lloydminster, a city located on the border of the Canadian provinces of Alberta and Saskatchewan. It was owned by Stingray Radio alongside Citytv affiliate CKSA-DT (channel 2). The two stations shared studios at 50 Street and 51 Avenue on the Alberta side of Lloydminster; CITL-DT's transmitter was located near Highway 17 and Township Road 512, near the Saskatchewan provincial line.

== History ==
The station first signed on the air on July 28, 1976, and had been a CTV affiliate since its sign-on. CITL, along with their sister station CKSA, were acquired by Newcap Broadcasting in 2005 from their former owner, Midwest Television.

Prior to the August 31, 2011, digital transition, CITL had rebroadcast transmitters in Wainwright, Provost, Bonnyville, Meadow Lake and Alcot Trail. The station's main transmitter was required to participate in the digital transition, but Newcap also decided to shut its other transmitters, other than Alcot Trail's, on the same date, though there was no requirement to shut down or convert any of these other transmitters to digital.

The station had attempted to add a rebroadcaster in Fort McMurray in 2006, but this was subsequently withdrawn. The application had been surprising since a CTV-owned station, CFRN-TV, had already served the area on cable with some separate news programming and commercials since 1990 from CFRN's repeater in Ashmont.

CITL along with CKSA were two of the last remaining Canadian stations that continued to sign off overnight, along with Omni Television stations and others.

On May 13, 2025, Stingray Radio announced that CITL and CKSA had ceased operations effective immediately, citing "challenging economic conditions" and "careful consideration of the evolving media landscape and the challenges facing local television broadcasting". SaskTel replaced CITL with Saskatoon's CTV station CFQC-DT. On July 18, 2025, CITL-DT had its licence revoked by the CRTC.

== Programming ==
As of October 18, 2018, CITL cleared the vast majority of the CTV schedule, and was the last CTV station in Western Canada to air the network's national morning shows (formerly Canada AM; currently Your Morning) on a tape delay in the 6–9 a.m. time slot (with all CTV owned-and-operated stations between Vancouver and Winnipeg airing local CTV Morning Live programs instead). The station carried the entirety of CTV's prime time lineup. Previously, the station preempted stripped broadcasts of etalk and/or repeats of The Big Bang Theory on certain nights with local programming. Additionally, CITL preempted CTV's The View in favor of 100 Huntley Street, a brokered religious program which is also commonly aired by Global stations, as well as the weekend's network repeats of the previous night's late edition of TSN's SportsCentre for Eat Street and infomercials, Sunday's Question Period and the weekday early edition of CTV National News. CITL also broke away from the network late-night schedule at about 2:12 a.m. (after Conan) on weeknights, and earlier on weekends, to sign off, as CITL, along with sister CKSA, have the Canadian national anthem "O Canada" played during the sign-off.

Until the mid-to-late 2000s, CITL also carried some Global programming alongside CTV shows; however, this was discontinued at some point after Global Edmonton was made available on basic cable in Lloydminster. Nonetheless the station sometimes carried various Canadian-made programs from the library of Global's parent company Corus Entertainment, though this was generally restricted to older programming (or at least older seasons) not currently airing on the Global network schedule.

CITL aired Prime Time Local News from 5 to 7 p.m., and Late Local News at 11:30 p.m. on weeknights; there was no local news on weekends. The 5 p.m. hour of Prime Time Local News was simulcast on CKSA. In addition, unlike CKSA where it simulcast newscasts from Global Edmonton, CITL did not simulcast any newscasts from CTV Edmonton or any other CTV station. Reruns of Chopped Canada aired at noon, in place of any local newscast, or the noon hour newscast from CTV Edmonton.

CITL and CKSA previously aired Newcap News until August 31, 2018. On September 4, 2018, the newscasts were reformatted from a traditional newscast to a news magazine, and was re-branded as Prime Time Local News.

== Former transmitters ==
Until August 31, 2011, CITL-DT also operated the first four transmitters listed below. According to Industry Canada's TV database, as of August 2012, the station no longer has a broadcast licence for the last transmitter noted. Therefore, the station no longer has any rebroadcasting transmitters.

Former transmitters
Station	City of licence	Channel	ERP	HAAT	Transmitter coordinates
CITL-TV-1	Wainwright, AB	6 (VHF)	0.01 kW	NA	52°51′11″N 110°48′6″W
CITL-TV-2	Provost, AB	5 (VHF)	0.01 kW	NA	52°22′10″N 110°10′19″W
CITL-TV-3	Meadow Lake, SK	3 (VHF)	0.01 kW	NA	54°7′16″N 108°27′53″W
CITL-TV-4	Bonnyville, AB	7 (VHF)	0.01 kW	NA	54°11′54″N 110°50′31″W
CITL-TV-10	Alcot Trail, SK	58 (UHF)	0.01 kW	NA	53°53′8″N 108°24′35″W
