= Denham Jolly =

Jamaican Canadian businessman, publisher, broadcaster and civil rights activist

Brandeis Denham Jolly, OD, CM, LL.D (born August 26, 1935) is a Jamaican-Canadian businessman, publisher, broadcaster, human rights activist, philanthropist and author of In the Black: My Life. He was the president and CEO of Milestone Communications.

== Early life and education ==
Jolly was born in Green Island, Jamaica, and attended Cornwall College. He studied at the University of Guelph, Dalhousie University, in Nova Scotia and McGill University, in Montreal where he graduated in 1960 with a degree in science.

== Career ==
Jolly returned to Jamaica after graduation and worked at Nutrition Research for the government of Jamaica. He moved to Canada in 1962 and engaged in Air Pollution Research for Metropolitan Toronto. After studying Education and obtaining a teaching certificate, Jolly taught Chemistry and Physics at Forest Hill Collegiate in Toronto, 1963-1968.

Jolly entered the business world by buying a rooming house on the University of Toronto Campus and in 1968 started Donsview Nursing Home in Toronto. He went on to build a Day's Inn Hotel in Mississauga, Ontario and also acquired a nursing home in Dallas, Texas. He owned and operated for over 40 years a 210 bed nursing and retirement home facility, Tyndall Nursing Home and Estates on a 2.5 acre property in Mississauga. At one time Jolly owned, two medical laboratories in Toronto, Ed-Beck Pharmaceuticals and Standard Medical Diagnostics.

In 1982 Jolly bought and published the community newspaper Contrast. That year he also founded and led the Black Business and Professional Association and the Harry Jerome Awards. He was also active in the civil rights organizations and spoke out on social justice issues as a member of the Black Action Defence Committee and was a founding member of the Committee for Due Process.

Jolly launched Canada's first Black-owned radio station FLOW 93.5 CFXJ-FM through Milestone Communications. The fight to get the license took a dozen years and his struggle was featured in the Washington Post and the Toronto Star as an example of racial barriers in Canada. The license was finally awarded in June 2000. It was supported by both the Toronto Star and the Toronto Sun, which ran an editorial saying that "At long last the dinosaurs at the Canadian Radio and Telecommunications Commission have admitted Toronto needs a black-owned urban format station on the FM dial."

FLOW 93.5 went on air in February 2001 and was the first mainstream radio station to introduce hip-hop to Canada and the first to play Drake, and played and actively promoted Canada's Black musicians. It aired as a mixture of talk and music, including O.T.A. (On the Air) Live!, a weekly interview program with hip hop artists. FLOW 93.5 devoted airtime to black-oriented music and provided opportunities, at the highest level for many Black Canadians in the broadcasting industry. Many world class Artists like Janet Jackson, Lady Gaga, Jay-Z, Kanye West, Damian Marley, Rihanna and Drake found it imperative to visit the FLOW Studios in Toronto, even Sir. Richard Branson personally visited to launch his Virgin Mobile communications.

In 2005 FLOW won the Station of the Year Award in the Contemporary Hit Radio category at the Canadian Music Week Industry Awards. That year Jolly invested in a radio station in Edmonton, called The Bounce 91.7FM CHBN-FM.

Jolly was on the boards of the YMCA, Surrey Place and the world renowned Toronto International Film Festival, and currently serves on the board for the CaribbeanTales Media Group, a film production company based in Toronto. He has won awards for his cultural contributions including the Black Media Pioneer Award. the African Canadian Lifetime Achievement Award and the Canadian Urban Institute's City Soul Award in 2006. In 2007 he was presented with a Black History Award from the Markham African Caribbean Association.

Jolly sold his radio holdings in 2011 for $27 million. He then invested US$750,000 in a real estate development project in Barbados.

In Green Island, Hanover, Jamaica he developed 200 acres of beachfront and sold to Princess Hotels of Spain for their 2,000 room hotel, opening 2022.

Jolly's media appearances and interviews include programs: The Agenda with TVO's Steve Paikin, CBC Radio Q with Tom Powers, CTV's Pop Life and more.

Throughout Jolly's career he has been a keynote, motivational and guest speaker on many occasions. Jolly has spoken at: The National Word on the Street Book Festival in Toronto and at CBC Tent Halifax Festival and many libraries, schools and organizations in Toronto. Jolly has reviewed his book for the Inmates Book Club Collins Bay Medium Security Penitentiary in Kingston, ON.

Jolly's Philanthropic endeavors have included:

- In 2008 Jolly donated $50,000 towards the endowment of the Jean Augustine Chair in Education in the New Urban Environment at York University.
- In 2010, Jolly funded and organized a small group of volunteers to load a 20' shipping container with walking aids from his nursing home, to send to Haiti after the devastating earthquake.
- Jolly donated $50,000 to Sunnybrook Hospital Urology Department, Toronto.
- He also donated to the Lucie & Thorton and Blackburn Conference Centre project, George Brown College Toronto.
- In August 2019, Jolly paid off the mortgage of the Jamaican Canadian Association centre with a donation of $312,000.
- In 2019, Jolly revived a breakfast program at his Alma mater Cornwall College, Montego Bay, Jamaica, for sixty students per day.
- He continues his sponsorship of Industry Cove Basic School in Hanover, Jamaica.
- Since 2019, Jolly continues to sponsor the 2019 undefeated (Cosmos) Regent Park boys under twelve soccer team. In addition to sponsoring other local and Olympic Canadian athletes over the years.
- In May 2021, Jolly pledged $25,000.00 to The Lincoln Alexander School of Law at Toronto Metropolitan University for the B. Denham Jolly Racial Justice Award.

He continues to contribute to many other philanthropic endeavors in the community.

His memoir, In the Black: My Life was published in February 2017 by ECW Press. The book won the 2017 Toronto Book Award. Jolly also received an engraved stone placed in the Toronto's Official Book Garden memorializing his work.

On March 10, 2020, award winning filmmaker and producer, Frances-Anne Solomon of CaribbeanTales announced that she is in the process of developing Jolly's memoir into a feature film that is now in production.

== Honours ==
Jolly is named in the Who’s Who of Ontario, Who’s Who of Canada and the Who’s Who of Professionals.

The City of Toronto, on February 28, 2017, the final day of Black History Month, announced the naming of a street in a new Scarborough sub-division in honour of Mr. Denham Jolly, a Black pioneer in Canada's radio broadcasting industry. "Jolly Way" will commemorate the exceptional contributions to Canada of Denham Jolly. Jolly Way is located near the southwest corner of Midland Avenue and Ellesmere Avenue, in a residential neighbourhood under development by Mattamy Homes. "It is most appropriate that approval to name a street after Mr. Jolly has come through today, the last day of Black History Month 2017," said Councillor Michael Thompson, Chair of Toronto's Economic Development Committee. "Mr. Jolly has been instrumental in giving voice to the culture, achievements, challenges and aspirations of Toronto's Black and Caribbean communities when few channels for such messages were available," Thompson added. On November 1, 2019, The City of Toronto hosted a street name unveiling celebration honouring Jolly.

- November 27, 2020 the Governor General of Canada's office announced Mr. Jolly's appointment to the Order of Canada. Out of the 114 Canadians appointed in year 2020, Mr. Jolly was the only Black Canadian given the honour.
- May 22, 2021 The University of West Indies Toronto Benefit Awards honoured Mr. Jolly with the G. Raymond Chang Award for leadership and commitment to the betterment of communities in Canada and beyond. Mr. Jolly was awarded alongside, Ms. Naomi Campbell and Nelson Mandela's wife, Dr. Graça Machel, who each received Luminary Awards.
- October 2, 2021 Jolly was honoured by McGill University with the Macdonald Distinguished Alumni Award in recognition for his outstanding contributions to society and humanity.
- June 8, 2022 Recipient of Distinguished Leader Award at McGill Toronto Excellence Awards Banquet.
- June 9, 2022 was bestowed the Degree of Doctor of Laws, honoris causa, from the University of Toronto. In his convocation address, to over 400 graduates, his message was you can do well by doing good.
  Invitation read - the founder, president and CEO of FLOW 93.5, B. Denham Jolly is recognized for his service to the local community as a foundational and transformative leader and promoter of equity, social justice, civil rights and opportunity within the GTA.
- October 17, 2022 the Jamaican government awarded B. Denham Jolly the Order of Distinction in the rank of Officer, a national honour for contributions to the diaspora.
- June 15, 2023 was bestowed the Degree of Doctor of Laws, honoris causa, from the University of Guelph for his life of service reflects his commitment to Canada, Black communities and Homeland. Dr. Jolly's convocation address message was open your minds and your hearts to every culture without prejudice or bias. Invitation read - the degree recognizes your incredible success as an entrepreneur, philanthropist, leader, mentor and advocate.
