= CHBN-FM =

Radio station in Edmonton, Alberta

- Edmonton, Alberta; Canada
- Broadcast area: Edmonton Metropolitan Region
- Frequency: 91.7 MHz
- Branding: Kiss 91.7

Programming
- Format: Top 40/CHR

Ownership
- Owner: Rogers Radio; (Rogers Media, Inc.)
- Sister stations: CHDI-FM, CKEM-DT, CJEO-DT

History
- First air date: February 17, 2005
- Call sign meaning: "Bounce" (former branding)

Technical information
- Class: C1
- ERP: 96,000 watts
- HAAT: 200.3 metres (657 ft)
- Transmitter coordinates: 53°27′47″N 113°20′6.5″W

Links
- Webcast: Listen Live
- Website: kiss917.com

CHBN-FM (91.7 FM, "Kiss 91.7") is a radio station in Edmonton. Owned by Rogers Radio, a division of Rogers Sports & Media, it broadcasts a contemporary hit radio format. Its studios are located on Gateway Boulevard in Edmonton, while its transmitter is located near Anthony Henday Drive in eastern Edmonton.

The station was first launched on February 17, 2005 under the joint ownership of CHUM Limited and Milestone Radio, the parent company of CFXJ-FM in Toronto. At launch, CHBN aired a rhythmic top 40 before shifting to the current CHR format. CHBN was acquired by CTVglobemedia in 2007 when it acquired the assets of CHUM Limited. CTVglobemedia would later sell the station to Rogers (which had acquired its sister television station CKEM-DT as part of the CHUM sale) in 2010.

As of February 28, 2021, CHBN is the 10th-most-listened-to radio station in the Edmonton market according to a PPM data report released by Numeris.

== History ==
"The Bounce" logo from 2005 to 2017

CHBN signed on the air as 91.7 The Bounce at 4 p.m. on February 17, 2005. The first song on "The Bounce" was "Let's Get It Started" by The Black Eyed Peas. When the station first signed on, the station aired a rhythmic top 40 format, but moved to their current Top 40/CHR format in December 2005. They became the only top 40 station in the Edmonton market when CKRA (96X) shifted their format to play a hot adult contemporary format in August 2005, and then later to country four months later. After this surprise development, The Bounce shifted to more mainstream pop music.

Every year in October, in an event called "Bras Across the Bridge", for Breast Cancer Awareness Month, CHBN collects bras from listeners, donating $1 to the Canadian Breast Cancer Foundation for every bra collected. At the end of the month, they then tie all the bras together and span the string of bras across the High Level Bridge as many times as they can.

At the time of their launch, CHBN was jointly owned by CHUM Limited and Milestone Radio. In June 2007, all of CHUM's assets, including its share of CHBN, were sold to CTVglobemedia. On June 23, 2010, CTVgm announced that it would sell CHBN to Rogers (then-owner of CHDI-FM and CKER-FM) for an undisclosed amount, pending CRTC approval.

When CFMG-FM flipped from AC to CHR as Virgin Radio, it marked the first three-station FM top 40 battle in Edmonton as of February 2011 (the other competitor being CJNW). Since the launch of Virgin, CHBN has been playing fewer commercials, as seen with the introduction of Commercial Free Mondays, and playing more currents and higher-charting songs than its competition. CHBN will continue to report on Mediabase and Nielsen BDS' Canadian contemporary hit radio panel.

On February 24, 2017, at 10 a.m., CHBN re-branded as Kiss 91.7, to match the branding of other Rogers CHR and hot AC stations.

== Bounce Showdown ==
The Bounce held seven singing contests, named the "Bounce Showdown", it was called Canada's most successful talent competition. The winner of the Bounce Showdown is signed to record two songs with a record label, and their songs played on the Bounce. The past winners have been:

- 2005: Kreesha Turner
- 2006: Shiloh
- 2007: Nathan Brown
- 2008: Quanteisha Benjamin
- 2009: Justin Blais
- 2010 (June): Beatrice "Love" Gouchey
- 2010 (November): Bryan Finlay
