= Fitzroy Gordon =

Jamaican-Canadian broadcaster, radio host, and DJ (1954–2019)

- Born: March 19, 1954; Saint Andrew Parish, Jamaica
- Died: April 30, 2019 (aged 65); Toronto, Ontario, Canada
- Occupation: Radio Broadcaster
- Known for: Grapevine, G98.7
- Notable work: G98.7 FM
- Spouse: Marvette Gordon

Fitzroy Anthony Gordon (March 19, 1954 – April 30, 2019) was a Jamaican-Canadian broadcaster, radio host and DJ, based in Toronto, Ontario, Canada. He was most notable as the founder of G98.7, Canada's second radio station geared specifically to Black and Caribbean audiences. As a broadcaster, he was dedicated to community service, notably through his shows Dr. Love on CHIN Radio and Grapevine on G98.7.

== Early career ==
Born in Jamaica on March 19, 1954, Gordon immigrated to Canada in 1979 and worked as a sports journalist writing for newspapers and magazines in the Canadian and Caribbean communities. Gordon began his radio career on Toronto's CHIN radio station, producing and hosting the Dr. Love Show, an overnight music and talk show aimed at the Caribbean community, for nineteen years. He simultaneously maintained a 15-year career as a sports journalist, specializing on cricket, on The Score where he hosted the International Sports Report, and the FAN 590 in Toronto, and as a columnist for newspapers the Toronto Sun, the Gleaner & Star, and Contrast. In 1998 Gordon left CHIN in order to pursue his dream of opening a radio station dedicated to Black and Caribbean audiences.

== G98.7 ==
G98.7 was a project realized through over a decade of work. Gordon was strongly motivated by a desire to see a platform for Black and Caribbean voices in Toronto. His first application for a broadcast licence from the Canadian Radio-television and Telecommunications Commission (CRTC) was turned down in 2001. In 2009 he was given a partial license, which did not include broadcast frequency. Finally securing a frequency at 98.7FM, Gordon needed the approval of the national Canadian Broadcasting Corporation (CBC) to broadcast so close to CBC Toronto's 99.1 FM band. The CBC initially refused, and Gordon spent all of his personal savings fighting them. The licence was also challenged by commercial radio station FLOW 93.5FM, claiming that the station would duplicate its format. This was despite community input that FLOW did not represent them or their interests. After a CRTC ruling in favour of the station in 2011, the station was officially licensed in June of that year. It launched that November with Jimmy Cliff's cover of "I Can See Clearly Now." The station's listenership quickly expanded to reach a diverse audience throughout the city inclusive of many communities.

Gordon hosted G98.7's Gospel Morning program on weekends, and the Grapevine Talk Show on Sunday afternoons. In addition to Toronto's Black and Caribbean communities, Gordon encouraged programming focusing on Toronto's large African communities as well.

== Awards and honours ==
In 2015, Gordon received a Special Recognition Award from the Jamaican Canadian Association.

== Death and legacy ==
The call numbers of G98.7, CKFG-FM, include the initials of Gordon (CKFG), in recognition of his indispensable role in its founding. Gordon suffered a stroke in 2017 and died on April 30, 2019, in Toronto at the age of 65. At the time of his death, Gordon had been working towards a television station geared towards the Black and Caribbean communities. His death was noted in official statements by the Prime Minister of Canada, Andrea Horwath, Leader of the Official Opposition NDP, and the Mayor of Toronto. Horwath spoke at the memorial service at the invitation of the Gordon family. Hundreds attended Global Kingdom Ministries in Scarborough for Gordon's funeral service, including Ontario's first Black Caucus, made up of NDP MPPs elected to the provincial parliament.
