= Rise and Shine (children's song) =

Children's camp song about Noah's Ark

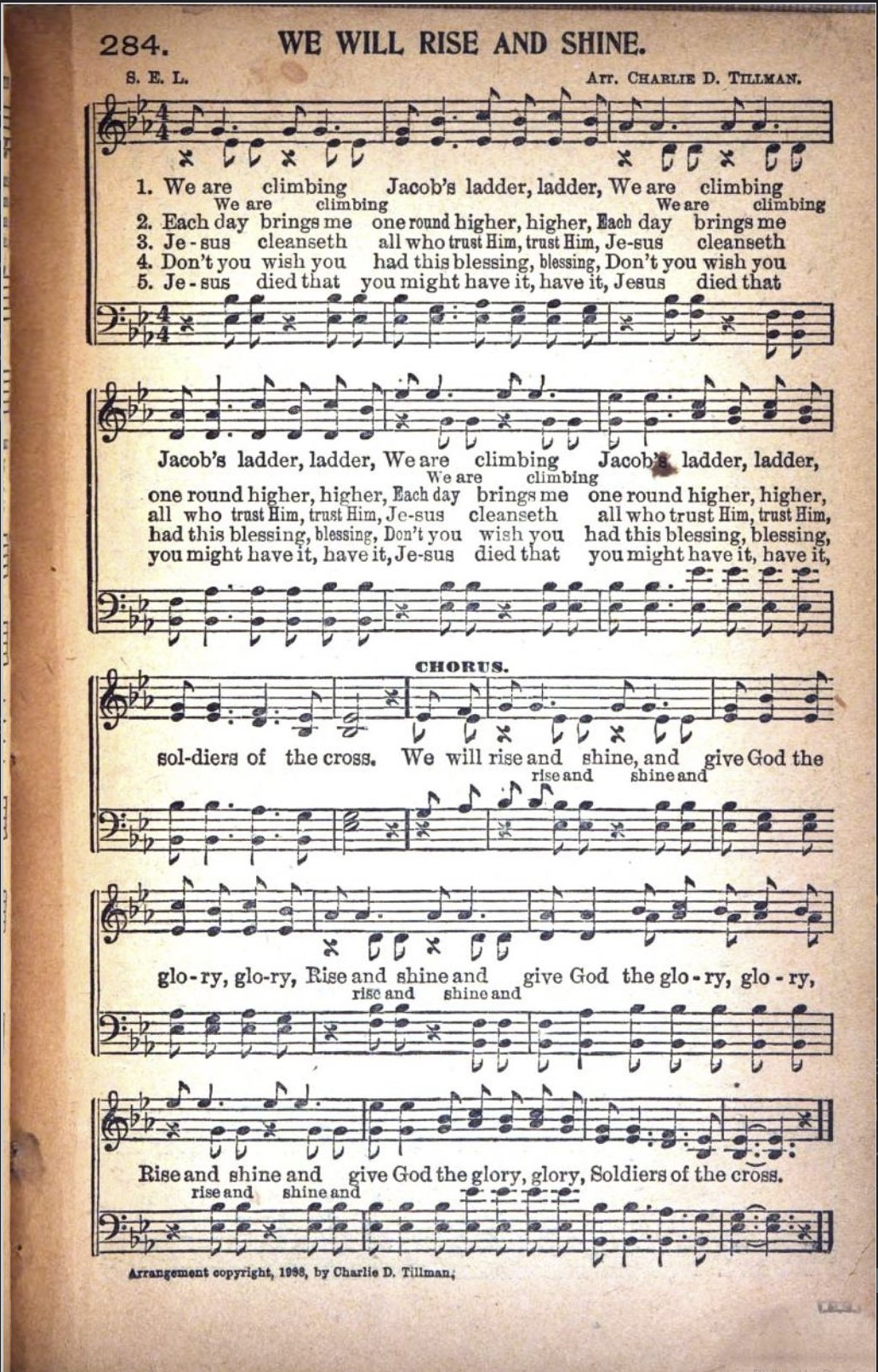
1908 lyrics of "We Will Rise and Shine" a later adaption of "We are Climbing Jacob's Ladder". The lyrics here feature a similar refrain of "Rise and Shine and Give God the Glory, Glory", which is used in the Arky camp song

Rise and Shine (And Give God The Glory, Glory) also known as Arky, Arky (Children of the Lord) is a children's camp song about Noah's Ark.

== History ==
The song lyrics and tune are loosely adapted from the earlier African American Spiritual song, "We Are Climbing Jacob's Ladder", which was written prior to 1825. Later versions of "We Are Climbing Jacob's Ladder" include the refrain "Rise and Shine and Give God the Glory, Glory". The lyric is likely derived from a similar verse in the Book of Isaiah 60:1 which states: "Arise, shine; for thy light is come, and the glory of the Lord is risen upon thee" in reference to Zion.

According to some sources, such as Religious Folk Songs of the Hampton Institute, the earliest version of the children's song date to at least 1874, but the 1874 version does not include the Noah lyrics, which appear to have been added in the twentieth century. Today the children's version of the song is commonly sung at various Sunday schools, scout camps and camps for Christian and Jewish children. Notable folk artists such as Pete Seeger have covered the song.

== In pop culture ==
- The song is featured several times in the VeggieTales film "Minnesota Cuke and the Search for Noah's Umbrella", specifically as the code to open a secret passage in a scene that parodies Indiana Jones and the Last Crusade.
- The modernised “arky arky” chorus version of the song is featured in season 1, episode 10 of The Testaments, sung by Becka (Mattea Conforti) in jail.
