= Yes TV =

Canadian television system

- Country: Canada
- Headquarters: Crossroads Centre, Burlington, Ontario, Canada

Ownership
- Owner: Crossroads Christian Communications
- Key people: Kevin Shepherd (CEO, Crossroads & YesTV); Melissa McEachern (chief operating officer & chief content officer); David Darby (General Manager); Robert Melnichuk (Director of Western Canada)

History
- Launched: September 30, 1998
- Founder: David Mainse
- Former names: Crossroads Television System (1998–2014)

Links
- Website: yestv.com

Yes TV (stylized as yes TV) is an independently owned Canadian nonprofit and Canadian Radio-television and Telecommunications Commission-licensed religious broadcasting television system in Canada. It consists of three conventional over-the-air television stations (located in the Greater Toronto Area, Calgary, and Edmonton), two rebroadcast transmitters, and several partial affiliates. Formerly known as the Crossroads Television System (CTS), the Yes TV stations and repeaters air a line-up consisting predominantly of Christian faith-based programming, such as televangelists and Crossroads' flagship Christian talk show 100 Huntley Street, as well as religious programming from other faiths to meet "balance" expectations of Canadian broadcast policy. During the late-afternoon and evening hours, Yes TV broadcasts secular, family-oriented sitcoms, game shows, and reality series; the system's September 2014 re-launch as Yes TV emphasized its newly acquired Canadian rights to a number of major U.S. reality series, which at that point included American Idol and The Biggest Loser.

Outside of the three owned and operated Yes TV stations, the system also syndicates acquired programming to other Canadian independent stations through a secondary affiliation network called IndieNet (stylized as indieNET). It is operated out of Crossroads' headquarters in Burlington, Ontario.

== History ==
The Crossroads Television System (CTS) originally consisted of a single television station, CITS-TV in Hamilton, Ontario (also serving Toronto), with rebroadcast transmitters in London and Ottawa. CITS, launched in 1998, was the second religious terrestrial television station launched in Canada, after CJIL-TV in Lethbridge, Alberta.

On June 8, 2007, the Canadian Radio-television and Telecommunications Commission approved CTS' application for new television stations to serve the Calgary and Edmonton markets. Respectively, these are CKCS-DT, which broadcasts on channel 32, and CKES-DT, which broadcasts on channel 45; both stations launched on October 8, 2007.

On August 12, 2014, CTS announced that it would relaunch as "Yes TV" on September 1, 2014. Describing the new brand as "embracing positivity and approaching the world with an affirmative position", the re-launch coincided with the announcement that it had picked up many new secular reality and game shows for the 2014–15 season, including America's Funniest Home Videos (formerly aired by Citytv), American Idol (formerly aired by CTV and CTV 2), Judge Judy, Jeopardy! and Wheel of Fortune (both formerly aired most-recently by CHCH-DT), The Biggest Loser (formerly aired by City), and The X Factor (UK).

On September 13, 2016, Yes TV started airing a 3-hour block (later, a 2½-hour block) of Buzzr programs from 1 to 3:30 a.m. (formerly 1 to 4 a.m.). When the block started, the schedule aired original black and white episodes of To Tell the Truth, What's My Line? and I've Got a Secret followed by two episodes of Card Sharks on Tuesdays and Saturdays, Double Dare on Wednesday, Beat the Clock on Thursdays and Sale of the Century on Fridays. The schedule was updated on April 9, 2017, with two episodes of Match Game, episodes of Super Password and Tattletales and concluding with an episode from either Card Sharks, Double Dare, Beat the Clock or Sale of the Century (all four aired on the same day as the previous schedule). The schedule was updated again on October 10, 2017; the current schedule as of now is an episode of Match Game, an episode of Super Password, an episode of Tattletales, an episode of Blockbusters and an episode of Press Your Luck. Body Language briefly replaced the Blockbusters spot on the schedule in December 2017. The Buzzr block was phased out in September 2018.

Sometime around August 2023, Yes TV announced that they would resume streaming live in the 2023-24 season. The live video feed is restricted to Canadian viewers.

== Stations and affiliates ==
=== Owned and operated ===
City of license/market	Call sign	Channel TV (RF)
Hamilton, Ontario (Greater Toronto Area)	CITS-DT	Hamilton: 36.1 (36); CITS-DT-1/Ottawa: 15.1 (15); CITS-DT-2/London: 19.1 (19)
Calgary, Alberta	CKCS-DT	32.1 (32)
Edmonton, Alberta	CKES-DT	45.1 (30)

=== Secondary affiliates (indieNET) ===
Alongside the CTS O/A YES TV stations, the system sublicenses some of its commercial programs to other independent broadcasters in Ontario, British Columbia, and Newfoundland and Labrador. The arrangement was first referred to in advertising sales information as Net5, referring to the three Yes TV stations and two secondary affiliates: CHEK-DT and CJON-DT. Starting with the 2016-2017 broadcast season, Net5 rebranded as indieNET following the addition of CHCH-DT and CHNU-DT.

ZoomerMedia, owner of CHNU-DT, has since withdrawn from indieNET. The partnership continues with the remaining six stations.

City of license	Call sign	Channel TV (RF)	Owner
Hamilton, Ontario	CHCH-DT	11.1 (15)	Channel Zero
Victoria, British Columbia	CHEK-DT	6.1 (49)	CHEK Media Group
St. John's, Newfoundland and Labrador	CJON-DT	21.1 (21)	Stirling Communications International

== Programming ==
=== Removal of Word TV ===
In December 2010, CTS removed Word TV, a program hosted by televangelist Charles McVety, from their schedule, following a decision by the Canadian Broadcast Standards Council (CBSC) over statements that he disparaged gay people while commenting on Toronto's gay pride parade (which he called a "sex parade") and Ontario's sex education curriculum for public schools (which he charged that children would go to school not to learn, but to become gay). The CBSC has ordered CTS to announce the ruling at least twice on the air, and to take steps that incidents like this do not happen again. In January 2011, CTS cancelled Word TV, leading McVety to announce his intention to sue CTS for political persecution. CTS responded in a press release that McVety was asked many times to cease his distorting and polarizing behaviour, and to comply with broadcasting guidelines, yet he refused to do so.

== Logos ==
1998–2002

2002–2005

2005–2014

2014–present

== See also ==
- Joytv, a former television system with affiliates in the provinces of British Columbia and Manitoba carrying similarly styled multi-faith religious and secular programming
- 2007 Canada broadcast TV realignment
