= Radio sweeper =

Pre-recorded radio station identifier

In radio broadcasting, a sweeper is a short, pre-recorded sample used by radio stations as segues between songs that give listeners a brief station identifier or promo, generally 20 seconds or less: "You're listening to the soft sounds of [NAME] radio. Easy listening throughout the Bay Area," for example.

Dry radio sweepers are voice only—no music or sound effects—whereas wet sweepers generally contain sound effects (also known as "sonic", a global term for all sound effects and elements used in a sweeper).

Sweepers are also known as liners, bumpers, radio imaging, sweeps, station imaging, stingers, IDs, idents, promos, shotguns and intros. Most sweepers will have a voice over included on the audio.

The term sweeper can mean more specifically a louder volume type of promo, usually announcing the station name or presenter or event. Promos, as distinct from sweepers, do not sweep in and are not intended to wake up or jolt the listener or brush what is currently on air. On radio software used in studio software there are sweeper sections, promos sections, effects, intros, etc. Over time terms can get blurred; sweeper is both a general term and a more specific term.
