= 100 Huntley Street =

Canadian Christian talk show

- Genre: Talk show
- Created by: David Mainse
- Starring: Joe Amaral; Lara Watson; Mark Masri; Cheryl Weber
- Country of origin: Canada
- Original language: English

Production
- Executive producers: Lara Watson; Melissa McEachern
- Running time: 90 minutes (1977–?); 60 minutes (?–2012, 2014–2017); 30 minutes (2013–present)

Original release
- Network: Global (1977-2018); Yes TV (1998–present)
- Release: June 15, 1977 – present

100 Huntley Street is a Canadian Christian daily television talk show and the flagship program of Crossroads Christian Communications based in Burlington, Ontario, Canada. It is the longest-running Canadian daily television show, with over 12,000 episodes.

Created in 1976 by David Mainse, it first aired on June 15, 1977, from its first studios, located at 100 Huntley Street in the St. James Town area of downtown Toronto with Mainse as the original host. Originally 90 minutes long, it now lasts 30 minutes. The program currently airs at 9 a.m. and 9 p.m. weekdays on Yes TV. Guests have included Malcolm Muggeridge, Colonel Harland Sanders, Billy Graham, Keith Green and Charlton Heston.
