= CKES-DT =

Television station in Edmonton

- Edmonton, Alberta; Canada
- Channels: Digital: 30 (UHF); Virtual: 45
- Branding: Yes TV Edmonton

Programming
- Affiliations: Yes TV

Ownership
- Owner: Crossroads Christian Communications; (Crossroads Television System)

History
- First air date: October 8, 2007
- Former call signs: CKES-TV (2007–2011)
- Former channel numbers: Analog: 45 (UHF, 2007–2011)

Technical information
- Licensing authority: CRTC
- ERP: 42 kW
- HAAT: 294.0 m (965 ft)
- Transmitter coordinates: 53°27′47″N 113°20′6.5″W

Links
- Website: Yes TV Edmonton

CKES-DT (channel 45) is a television station in Edmonton, Alberta, Canada, part of the Yes TV system. Owned and operated by Crossroads Christian Communications, the station has studios on Calgary Trail Northwest and 52nd Avenue in Edmonton, and its transmitter is located in Sherwood Park.

== History ==
Licensed by the Canadian Radio-television and Telecommunications Commission (CRTC) on June 8, 2007, the station began broadcasting five months later on October 8, 2007, on UHF channel 30.

CTS was rebranded as "Yes TV" on September 1, 2014. The rebranding coincided with the introduction of several secular programs into the schedule such as American Idol, Wheel of Fortune and Jeopardy!.

== Programming ==
Yes TV airs programming intended for family viewing, mostly based on Christian values, including dramas, comedies, mini-series and reality, game, and talk shows; although Yes TV also features shows on political commentary and other religions, including Judaism, Islam and Sikhism. Yes TV also airs secular mainstream programs during prime time hours. It is governed by the CRTC's Religious Broadcast Regulations and follows a policy of not airing shows containing "coarse language, gratuitous violence or explicit sexual scenes."

== Technical information ==
=== Subchannel ===
Subchannel of CKES-DT
Channel	Res.	Short name	Programming
30.1	1080i	YESTV-H	Yes TV

=== Analog-to-digital conversion ===
On August 11, 2011, 3 1/2 weeks before the official August 31 date on which Canadian television stations in CRTC-designated mandatory markets transitioned from analog to digital broadcasts, the station flash cut its digital signal into operation on UHF channel 30, using virtual channel 45.1.
