= CJEO-DT =

Television station in Edmonton

- Edmonton, Alberta; Canada
- Channels: Digital: 16 (UHF); Virtual: 56
- Branding: Omni Television

Programming
- Affiliations: Omni Television

Ownership
- Owner: Rogers Sports & Media; (Rogers Media Inc.)
- Sister stations: TV: CKEM-DT, Sportsnet West; Radio: CHDI-FM, CHBN-FM

History
- First air date: September 15, 2008
- Former call signs: CJEO-TV (2008–2011)
- Former channel numbers: Analog: 56 (UHF, 2008–2011); Digital: 44 (UHF, 2011–2020)
- Call sign meaning: Edmonton's Omni

Technical information
- Licensing authority: CRTC
- ERP: 32 kW
- HAAT: 288 m (945 ft)
- Transmitter coordinates: 53°31′55″N 113°46′53″W

Links
- Website: Omni Alberta

CJEO-DT (channel 56) is a multicultural television station in Edmonton, Alberta, Canada, part of the Omni Television network. It is owned and operated by Rogers Sports & Media alongside Citytv station CKEM-DT (channel 51). Both stations share studios with Rogers' local radio stations on Gateway Boulevard in Edmonton, while CJEO-DT's transmitter is located near Yellowhead Highway/Highway 16A.

== History ==
CJEO-TV's pre-launch logo

Omni Alberta logo used from 2008 to 2018.

The station was licensed by the Canadian Radio-television and Telecommunications Commission (CRTC) on June 8, 2007, and first signed on the air on September 15, 2008. The station was originally assigned the call sign CHXE by Industry Canada, but this was changed to CJEO in February 2008.

In late 2015, Rogers' television stations in Edmonton moved from their studios in downtown Edmonton to the headquarters of Rogers' Edmonton radio stations on Gateway Boulevard.

== Newscasts ==
Omni Alberta formerly produced local newscasts aimed at the Cantonese, Mandarin, and South Asian communities across the province. While there were newsgathering teams in both Edmonton and Calgary, the production of the newscasts themselves were based out of CKEM's studios in Downtown Edmonton. The newscasts were discontinued and replaced by Omni's national newscasts in September 2011; the national newscasts still featured contributions from Edmonton-based reporters.

On May 30, 2013, Rogers announced that it would immediately close down the production facilities for both Omni Alberta stations as a result of budget cuts—ending the production of local programming and news content from the stations.

== Technical information ==
=== Subchannel ===
Subchannels of CJEO-DT
Channel	Res.	Short name	Programming
56.1	1080i	CJEO-DT	Omni Television

=== Analog-to-digital conversion ===
On August 31, 2011, when Canadian television stations in CRTC-designated mandatory markets transitioned from analog to digital broadcasts, the station flash cut its digital signal on UHF channel 44, using virtual channel 56.
