= David Mainse =

Canadian televangelist, broadcast executive and producer

- Born: August 13, 1936; Campbell's Bay, Quebec, Canada
- Died: September 25, 2017 (aged 81); Hamilton, Ontario, Canada
- Occupations: broadcaster, evangelical minister

David Mainse (August 13, 1936 – September 25, 2017) was a Canadian televangelist, broadcast executive and producer, and an evangelical Christian leader. He was the founder of Crossroads Christian Communications and host of the long-running Christian talk show 100 Huntley Street.

== Television career ==
In 1976, Mainse began a project to telecast daily. He took the initiative and obtained a $100,000 a year, 20-year lease on a building at 100 Huntley Street in downtown Toronto that was suitable for conversion into a television studio. The lead program of this new production company took the studio's address as its name. On June 15, 1977, the interview/talk show 100 Huntley Street (based on The 700 Club in the United States) was launched. This TV program featured more than 14,000 guests such as Billy Graham and Charlton Heston, and in 2015 was reported as one of three Canadian TV programs attracting over one million viewers each week. Crossroads produced a short-lived program for teenagers, Inside Track, in 1978.

In 1979, outside the Toronto mayor's office, Mainse protested the gay publication The Body Politic, saying that "parents and all decent people are particularly disgusted by the perversity, which publishes and disseminates anti-child, anti-parent dehumanizing materials." During the rally, Mainse was filmed protesting alongside Ken Campbell.

In 2009, Mainse returned to host 100 Huntley Street while his sons Ron and Reynold stepped down from the ministry while under investigation concerning an alleged Ponzi scheme.

In January 2010, he launched new television programs, Really Good Medicine and A Living Witness to Amazing Grace. That year he undertook a tour of 150 Canadian cities, "Thank You Canada", celebrating his 50th year of television ministry.

In June 2012, the same month as Crossroads' 50th anniversary, Mainse was presented the Queen Elizabeth II Diamond Jubilee Medal at a gala event at Roy Thomson Hall. In May 2015 he received a Lifetime Global Impact award from Empowered21, for making "a significant impact on the world through the power of the Holy Spirit".

Mainse died on September 25, 2017, from complications from MDS leukemia.
