= Rise & Shine (TV series) =

- Logo
- Starring: Calvin Floyd
- Country of origin: United States

Production
- Running time: 1 hour

Original release
- Network: WLTZ
- Release: November 1989 – December 2010

Related
- The Calvin Floyd Show

Rise & Shine is a morning talk show that aired weekdays at 6:00 AM ET on WLTZ in Columbus, Georgia from 1989 to 2010. The show ended due to host Calvin Floyd moving to a noon talk show.
