= CKEM-DT =

Television station in Edmonton

- Edmonton, Alberta; Canada
- Channels: Digital: 17 (UHF); Virtual: 51
- Branding: Citytv Edmonton; CityNews Edmonton (newscasts)

Programming
- Affiliations: Citytv

Ownership
- Owner: Rogers Sports & Media; (Rogers Media Inc.)
- Sister stations: TV: CJEO-DT, Sportsnet West; Radio: CHDI-FM, CHBN-FM

History
- First air date: September 18, 1997
- Former call signs: CKEM-TV (1997–2011)
- Former channel numbers: Analog: 51 (UHF, 1997–2011)
- Former affiliations: A-Channel (1997–2005)

Technical information
- Licensing authority: CRTC
- ERP: 107 kW
- HAAT: 294 m (965 ft)
- Transmitter coordinates: 53°31′55″N 113°46′53″W
- Repeater: CKEM-DT-1 Red Deer (See below)

Links
- Website: Citytv Edmonton

CKEM-DT (channel 51) is a television station in Edmonton, Alberta, Canada, owned and operated by the Citytv network, a division of Rogers Sports & Media. It is sister to Omni Television outlet CJEO-DT (channel 56). The two stations share studios with Rogers's local radio stations on Gateway Boulevard in Edmonton; CKEM-DT's transmitter is located near Yellowhead Highway/Highway 16A. The station also operates a rebroadcast transmitter (CKEM-DT-1, channel 4) in Red Deer.

CKEM was built as part of A-Channel, the regional television service constructed by Craig Broadcast Systems in 1997. Broadcasting from studios downtown in the historic Hudson's Bay Building, it was the first new commercial TV station in Edmonton since 1974; its style of news and programming was young and aggressive. The station also broadcast Edmonton Oilers hockey for its first several years on air. Ratings settled into third place, above the CBC but behind the established stations in town, CFRN and CITV. However, the station lost ratings momentum following a five-month strike by unionized employees.

Craig, overextended by its launch of Toronto 1 in 2003, sold itself to CHUM Limited, then-owner of Citytv, in 2004. CHUM moved other media properties into the Hudson's Bay Building, including a new radio station and Access Media Group; in 2005, the A-Channel stations took on the Citytv brand. Due to poor ratings and as part of a wave of layoffs, CHUM reduced the size of its local operation in Edmonton in 2006, cancelling the station's evening newscast. CHUM sold most of its assets to Bell Globemedia that same year; as Bell owned the CTV Television Network, the Citytv stations were spun off to Rogers. The station continued producing a morning newscast under the Breakfast Television brand until 2015 and reinstated evening local news programs in 2017.

== A-Channel ==
=== Hearing process ===
In 1993, The Alberta Channel Inc., a majority-owned company of Craig Broadcast Systems, applied to the Canadian Radio-television and Telecommunications Commission (CRTC) for a television service in the province of Alberta, to be known as The Alberta Channel (or A-Channel, for short). Craig owned two stations in its home province of Manitoba, namely CKX-TV, a CBC Television affiliate in Brandon, and the Manitoba Television Network (MTN) in Portage la Prairie and serving Winnipeg. Craig's application competed with AltaWest Television, a subsidiary of the CanWest Global System. The Alberta Channel promised stations in Calgary and Edmonton as well as repeaters to serve Drumheller, Lethbridge, and Red Deer. The Calgary and Edmonton stations would each offer 20 hours a week of local news plus the same amount of non-news local programming. The AltaWest bid, part of network parent CanWest's bid to turn Global into a third national network, envisioned a main station in Calgary. In the end, the CRTC opted not to award either group a licence, saying that neither proposal "would have added sufficient diversity" to Alberta television and would have harmed the province's existing television broadcasters.

In 1996, CanWest and Craig tried again with plans for new television service in Alberta. The A-Channel stations in Calgary and Edmonton would be autonomous, each employing 139 people; Craig also promised a C$14 million investment in independent television production in Alberta. The newscasts would have a style similar to Citytv in Toronto; U.S. entertainment programming would come from previously untapped sources, such as Fox and UPN.

Both bids drew concern from rural broadcasters, such as RDTV in Red Deer. Edmonton's CITV protested the CanWest bid, believing it would cause "an unbalancing of the Canadian broadcasting system". CITV subleased the Edmonton-market rights to many popular U.S. shows from CanWest and stood to lose much of its highest-rated programming were they to establish a Global station there.

After a hearing in July, the CRTC issued a ruling in favor of A-Channel and against CanWest in November 1996. Unlike two years prior, it found the Alberta television market to be "stronger than the national average". Craig won out because of its promises to air more local programming and schedule more Canadian production in prime time. CanWest appealed to the federal cabinet, having suffered a blow to its ambitions of constructing a third national network. It believed that the smaller Craig, which it called "boutique", was less preferable than a third national choice for Canadians. The cabinet rejected CanWest's appeal in January 1997 and permitted Craig to construct the A-Channel stations, though it endorsed inquiries into a third national TV network, a minor win for the company.

=== Construction and early years ===
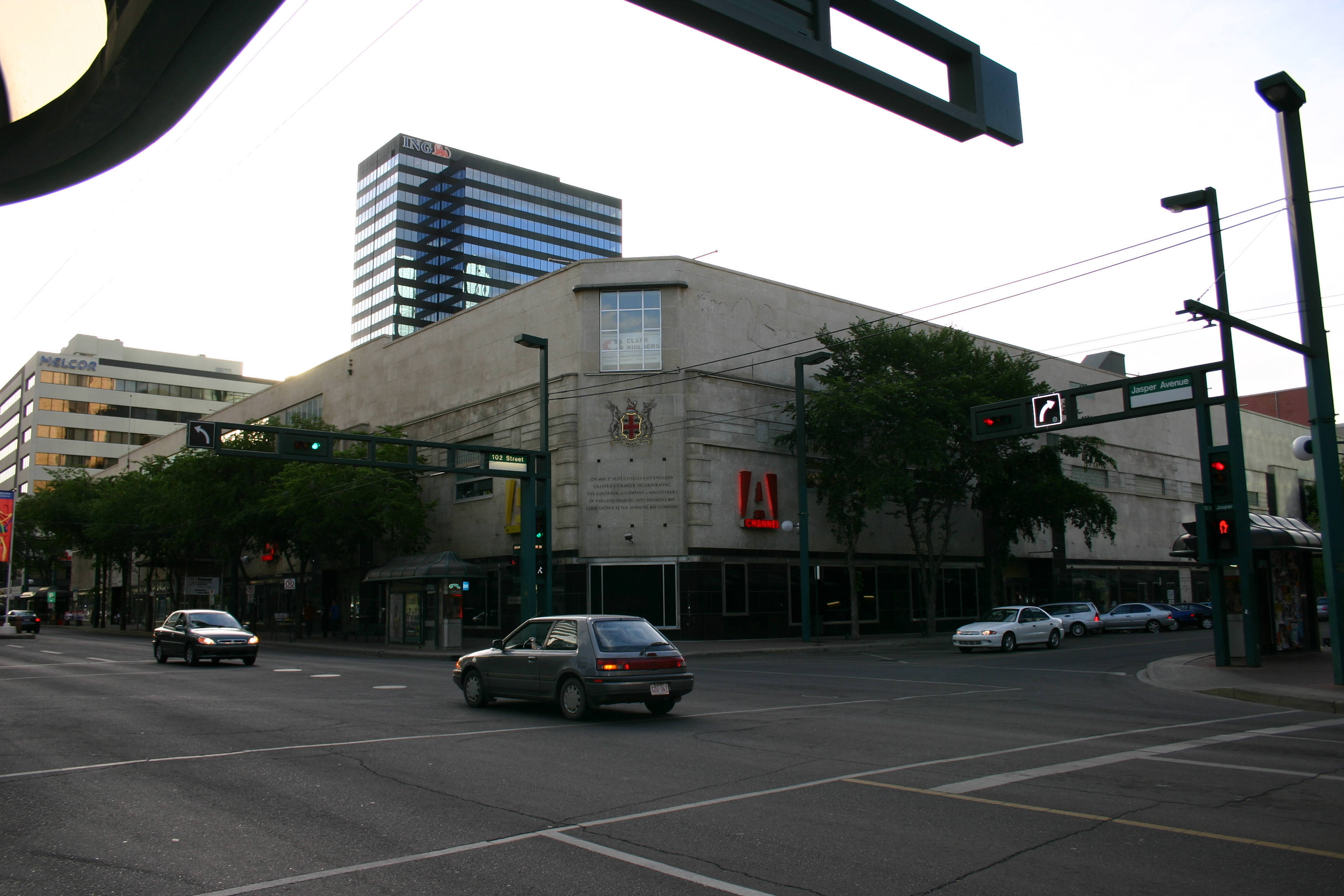
A-Channel Edmonton's original studios were in the historic Hudson's Bay Building downtown.

With the licence awards approved, Craig began construction on the Edmonton station. In Edmonton, A-Channel set up in the heritage-listed Hudson's Bay building on Jasper Avenue, where it added large windows to its streetside studio; historic preservation conditions complicated work, with new tiles having to be ordered from Quebec. In the Edmonton market, Craig scored a coup by rights to midweek telecasts of Edmonton Oilers hockey, which had been held by CFRN.

Most of the on-air talent hired for A-Channel Edmonton came from outside the market, except for Bruce Buchanan, who handled Oilers play-by-play. Darren Dreger was the first sports anchor, coming to the station from Winnipeg; Janis Mackey was a substitute anchor for CTV News in Toronto.

A-Channel launched in Edmonton on channel 51, cable 7 on September 18, 1997—two days before CKAL-TV in Calgary. The new station was the first addition to Edmonton broadcast television since CITV in 1974. Both stations relied on prime-time movies, a formula Craig had used with some success at MTN in Manitoba. For local programming, the station featured a two-hour morning show, The Big Breakfast; 6 and 10 p.m. newscasts; and the local programs Live @ Five and Wired, among others.

A-Channel's debut was riddled with technical issues. Jennifer Lyall, the co-host for the local Wired entertainment magazine, quit after just one day on air after not being given time to rehearse. News footage showed on the wrong stories or froze, while sound failed to play out. At one news conference, a local politician saw an A-Channel cameraman enter the room and began mouthing his words without speaking. The Calgary station also faced similar issues when it started. Many of the issues came down to the tapeless playback and editing system used for segments: over five days, the Calgary control room was rewired to bypass it in favor of older, but more reliable, video tape equipment, which led to far fewer on-air errors.

In the spring 1998 ratings, A-Channel Edmonton surpassed the CBC in prime time, but its local programs—outside of hockey—attracted few viewers. BBM found that Live@Five, the station's 5:00 news program, had just 600 viewers. Over the next two years, the stations became more competitive with ratings rises for their local morning and evening programming.

Craig agreed in building A-Channel to provide some protection to rural broadcasters by delaying the launch of rebroadcasters for one year. This resulted in uproar from Oilers fans who lived outside of A-Channel's coverage area and were shut out of seeing hockey. In December 1998, A-Channel debuted on cable in Red Deer, with a rebroadcaster following the next year.

On June 17, 1999, CKEM assignment editor Garnet Lewis was opening a videotape believed to contain news footage. It was actually a letter bomb, which exploded and injured Lewis and reporter Stacey Brotzel. The newsroom was able to return for its regular edition of News@Night after viewers saw the Calgary editions of the early evening news programs as a substitute. A month later, police arrested 28-year-old Raymond Neal Best for sending letter bombs to A-Channel and the Calgary police chief, as well as a hoax bomb to the police chief of Edmonton. Best was convicted of sending the bombs and sentenced to 12 years in prison.

For the second year, Gene Principe joined Buchanan on the Oilers telecasts and became A-Channel's sports anchor. The Oilers departed A-Channel Edmonton after the 2000–2001 season and consolidated their television games with Sportsnet West, adding 20 games to the cable channel's existing 28-game inventory. The team was believed to see increased revenue opportunity with a regional telecast. Principe, who had doubled as the sports director for A-Channel while appearing on its Oilers telecasts, left the station altogether to become a host for the Sportsnet telecasts.

=== 2003–2004 workers' strike ===
In July 2002, a majority of A-Channel Edmonton employees signed union cards and organized under the Communications, Energy and Paperworkers Union of Canada (CEP), which represented employees at Edmonton's other TV stations. Contract negotiations were unsuccessful, with the parties at odds over wages and a promise to not move jobs from Edmonton to Calgary; for the start of the fall television season, on September 17, 2003, workers walked out and began a strike. A-Channel continued airing newscasts because 10 to 15 employees crossed the picket line. Picketers made it difficult for employees to get inside the studios and sometimes followed news crews, while the union mounted a pressure campaign to urge national advertisers to cease doing business with A-Channel. Union members rejected a contract offer in December 2003, though about a third of the members had returned to work.

The strike was disastrous for A-Channel's ratings in the Edmonton market. A-Channel News at Six lost more than 60 percent of its viewership and slipped into a tie with the CBC for last. At the same time, startup costs for Toronto 1, a new station which Craig had built in 2003, and a series of new digital specialty channels proved to be a drain on the company's finances. In late January, Craig Media put itself up for sale. Weeks later, on February 14, strikers overwhelmingly voted to accept a contract offer, recognizing that much work was needed to regain the viewership that A-Channel had lost during the strike.

=== Acquisition by CHUM ===
On April 12, 2004, CHUM Limited announced a deal to purchase Craig Media for $265 million. The move came more than a month after the CRTC denied CHUM's applications for new Calgary and Edmonton stations because the market did not have sufficient advertising revenue to support a new entrant. The sale was approved by the Canadian Radio-television and Telecommunications Commission on November 19, 2004. CHUM had to sell off Toronto 1 because it already owned stations in Toronto (CITY) and nearby Barrie (CKVR); Toronto 1 was sold to Quebecor Media, owners of the media units TVA and Sun Media.

CHUM brought other media holdings into the Hudson's Bay Building on Jasper Avenue, which aside from A-Channel had few tenants. In February 2005, CHUM and Milestone Media launched a new Edmonton radio station, CHBN-FM "91.7 The Bounce", and built a streetside radio studio for it next to A-Channel's quarters. That same month, CHUM acquired all outstanding shares in Learning and Skills Television of Alberta (also known as Access Media Group), which operated Access, the provincial educational broadcaster. CHUM then moved Access Media Group's operations from an east Edmonton industrial park into the Hudson's Bay Building; traffic and master control were moved to Calgary and Toronto, resulting in 17 layoffs in Edmonton while creating four jobs in Calgary. The Calgary facility was already handling master control functions for A-Channel Edmonton.

== Citytv ==
=== Rebrand and news cuts ===
In addition to launching The Bounce and becoming the sole owner of Access Media Group in February 2005, CHUM announced that it would rebrand the three A-Channel stations—in Calgary, Edmonton, and Winnipeg—as Citytv, aligning with the stations it already owned in Toronto and Vancouver. No other significant changes were made, since the A-Channel stations' on-air look had always been very similar to that of Citytv; they initially retained their local programs, relaunched under Citytv's Breakfast Television morning brand and CityNews news brand. CHUM hoped to lift the stations' ratings with the new moniker. The change took effect on August 2 of the same year, when the A-Channel name was transferred to CHUM's NewNet stations.

The rebrand failed to increase news ratings. The spring 2006 BBM survey showed that the 6 p.m. newscast on Citytv Edmonton had dipped from 11,000 viewers to 4,000. On July 12, 2006, CHUM announced that it would dramatically reduce its newsgathering operations in Edmonton, Calgary, and Winnipeg, as well as in several other cities. It laid off 195 part- and full-time employees, including 47 in Edmonton. The evening newscasts were cancelled, while the noon newscast remained and Breakfast Television was expanded; news anchor Paul Mennier remained to host a new evening newsmagazine program. In a coincidental development, that same day, BCE Inc., the parent company of CTV, announced it would buy CHUM Limited.

=== Under Rogers ownership ===
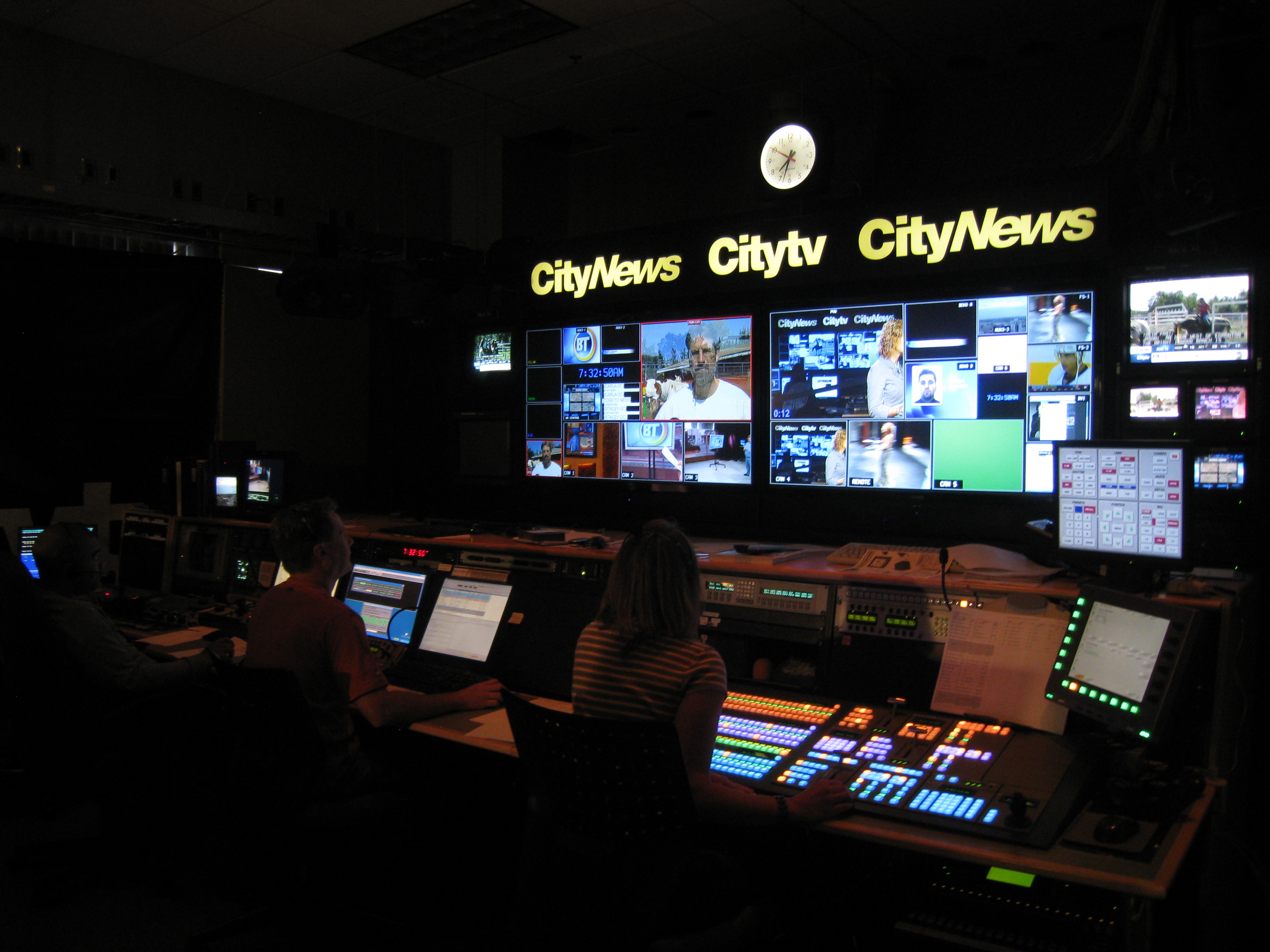
The Citytv Edmonton control room during Breakfast Television in 2010

On July 12, 2006, Bell Globemedia (later known as CTVglobemedia, and now Bell Media) announced plans to take over CHUM Limited. On June 8, 2007, the CRTC announced its approval of CTVglobemedia's purchase of CHUM Limited, but the commission added a condition that CTVglobemedia must sell off CHUM's Citytv stations to another buyer while allowing it to retain the A-Channel stations. The following Monday, Rogers Communications agreed to buy the five Citytv stations. The sale was approved by the CRTC on September 28, 2007. In 2008, Rogers launched Omni Edmonton, part of its Omni Television multicultural station group.

On January 19, 2010, CityNews at Noon, Your City, and CityNews International were cancelled as part of Citytv's corporate restructuring and concurrent layoffs. The CRTC approved the installation of digital transmission facilities for CKEM-TV on channel 17 that same year, ahead of the August 31, 2011, digital television switchover date.

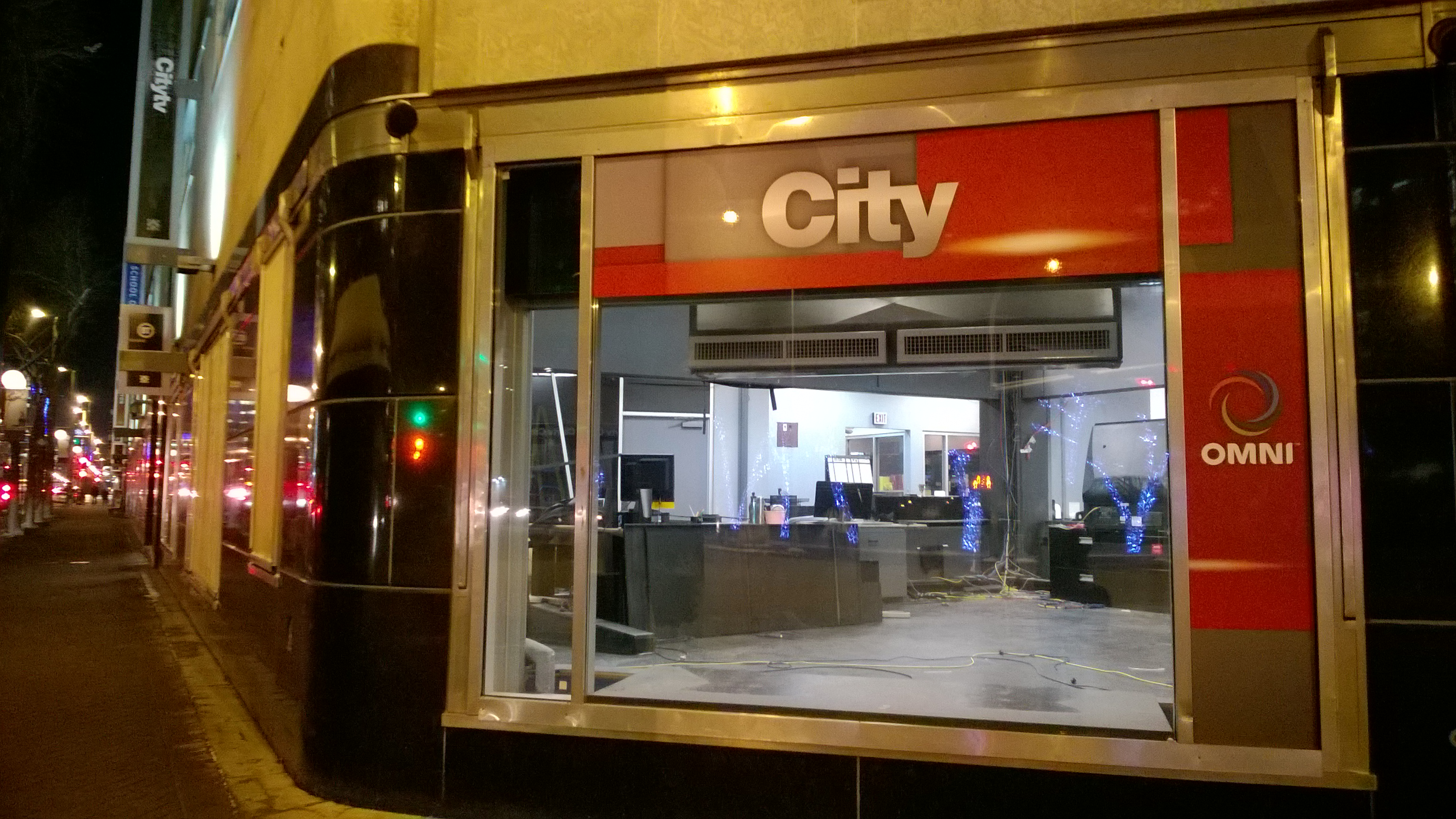
The former Citytv studio in Edmonton

On May 7, 2015, Rogers announced that as part of further cuts, Breakfast Television would be cancelled on May 19, 2015. It was replaced by the spin-off Dinner Television, a two-hour newsmagazine and discussion program hosted by former CFRN host and Edmonton Oilers player Jason Strudwick. The program did not feature original news reporting. An encore of the previous night's Dinner Television with on-screen news, weather, and traffic updates replaced Breakfast Television in its morning timeslot.

That December, the Rogers television stations in Edmonton moved from downtown to the headquarters of Rogers's Edmonton radio stations on Gateway Boulevard. Where once CHUM had 220 employees in the Hudson's Bay Building, there were fewer than two dozen when the company moved out. Some of the space was absorbed by the University of Alberta, which had previously purchased the historic structure.

On September 4, 2017, CityNews returned as part of a national expansion of local news programming across the Citytv stations, with Dinner Television being discontinued. CKEM airs two, hour-long newscasts at 6 and 11 p.m. nightly. Similarly to the format of its sister station in Toronto, Citytv Edmonton's newscasts use an "anchorless" format where all stories are presented by videojournalists on the field, eschewing in-studio anchors.

== Notable former on-air staff ==
- Stephanie Beaumont – host of Wired (2002–2003)
- Bill Welychka – host of Breakfast Television (2005–2006)

== Technical information ==
=== Subchannel ===
Subchannel of CKEM-DT
Subchannel	Res.	Short name	Programming
51.1	1080i	CItyTV	Citytv

=== Rebroadcaster ===
CKEM-DT has one dependent rebroadcaster, in Red Deer. In 2020, the CRTC approved the conversion of CKEM-TV-1 in Red Deer from analog to digital operation, switching from channel 4 to channel 15.

Technical information for CKEM-DT-1
Call sign	Location	Channel	ERP	HAAT	Transmitter coordinates
CKEM-DT-1	Red Deer	15 (UHF); Virtual: 4	35 kW	225.6 m (740 ft)	52°14′10″N 113°38′56″W
