= CKSA-FM =

Radio station in Lloydminster, Alberta/Saskatchewan

Coordinates: 53.2836°N 110.0077°W

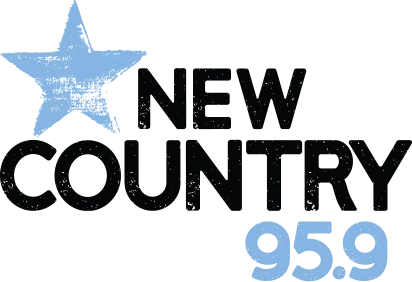
- Lloydminster, Alberta/Saskatchewan; Canada
- Frequency: 95.9 MHz
- Branding: New Country 95.9

Programming
- Format: Country

Ownership
- Owner: Stingray Group

History
- First air date: April 3, 1957
- Former frequencies: 1150 kHz (1957–1965); 1080 kHz (1965–2002)
- Call sign meaning: Saskatchewan and Alberta

Technical information
- Class: C1
- ERP: 43 kW vertical 100 kW horizontal
- HAAT: 164.2 metres (539 ft)

Links
- Webcast: Listen Live
- Website: newcountrylloydminster.ca

CKSA-FM (95.9 FM, New Country 95.9) is a radio station in Lloydminster, Alberta/Saskatchewan. Owned by Stingray Group, it broadcasts a country format. The station broadcasts from the studios in downtown Lloydminster on the Alberta side of the provincial border.

== History ==
CKSA started as an AM station on April 3, 1957. CKSA first broadcast on the 1150 kHz frequency and later changed to 1080 kHz in 1965. In 2002, the station received approval by the CRTC to move from the AM dial to the FM dial. For many years, CKSA was the only radio station in Lloydminster and the surrounding area owned by Midwest Broadcasting.

In the 1990s, CKSA changed its format to country, and it was once known as Country 108. After it was acquired by Newcap, it was rebranded as 95.9 Lloyd FM.

In November 2016, CKSA rebranded under the Real Country brand, as part of a rebranding of all Newcap-owned country stations in Alberta.

On March 4, 2024, CKSA rebranded under the New Country brand, as part of a rebranding of all Stingray-owned country stations in Canada.

== Past station logos ==
Real Country 95.9 Logo 2016–2024.
