= CKCS-DT =

Television station in Calgary

- Calgary, Alberta; Canada
- Channels: Digital: 32 (UHF); Virtual: 32
- Branding: Yes TV Calgary

Programming
- Affiliations: Yes TV

Ownership
- Owner: Crossroads Christian Communications; (Crossroads Television System)

History
- First air date: October 8, 2007
- Former call signs: CKCS-TV (2007–2011)
- Former channel numbers: Analogue: 32 (UHF, 2007–2011)
- Call sign meaning: Crossroads (current owner)

Technical information
- Licensing authority: CRTC
- ERP: 36 kW
- HAAT: 207.4 m (680 ft)
- Transmitter coordinates: 51°3′34″N 114°10′13″W

Links
- Website: Yes TV Calgary

CKCS-DT (channel 32) is a television station in Calgary, Alberta, Canada, part of the Yes TV system. Owned and operated by Crossroads Christian Communications, the station has studios at 5 Avenue and 8 Street Southwest in Downtown Calgary, and its transmitter is located in the Prominence Point neighborhood on the city's west side.

== History ==
Licensed by the Canadian Radio-television and Telecommunications Commission (CRTC) on June 8, 2007, the station began broadcasting five months later on October 8, 2007 on UHF channel 32.

CTS was rebranded as "Yes TV" on September 1, 2014. The rebranding coincided with the introduction of several secular programs into the schedule such as American Idol, Wheel of Fortune and Jeopardy!.

== Programming ==
Yes TV airs programming intended for family viewing, mostly based on Christian values, including dramas, comedies, mini-series and reality, game, and talk shows; although Yes TV also features shows on political commentary and other religions, including Judaism, Islam and Sikhism. Yes TV also airs secular mainstream programs during prime time hours. It is governed by the CRTC's Religious Broadcast Regulations and follows a policy of not airing shows containing "coarse language, gratuitous violence or explicit sexual scenes."

== Technical information ==
=== Subchannel ===
Subchannel of CKCS-DT
Channel	Res.	Short name	Programming
32.1	1080i	YESTV-H	Yes TV

=== Analogue-to-digital conversion ===
On August 11, 2011, 3 1/2 weeks before the official August 31 date on which Canadian television stations in CRTC-designated mandatory markets transitioned from analogue to digital broadcasts, the station shut down its analogue signal and flash cut its digital signal into operation on UHF channel 32.
