= 1983 in Canadian television =

This is a list of Canadian television related events from 1983.

== Events ==
Date	Event
February 1	The first pay television channels launch. They include Movie Central, The Movie Network, Super Écran and C Channel
March 23	4th Genie Awards.
April 5	Juno Awards of 1983.
May 29	The Atlantic Satellite Network launches in the Maritime provinces.

=== Debuts ===
Show	Station	Premiere Date
The Joke's on Us	Global	January 10
Fraggle Rock	CBC Television	January 10
Guess What	CTV	January 10
Snow Job	CTV	February 21

=== Ending this year ===
Show	Station	Cancelled
V.I.P.	CBC Television	April 8
Home Fires	CBC Television	November 17
The Alan Thicke Show	CTV	Unknown
Headline Hunters	CTV	Unknown
University of the Air	CTV	Unknown
Read All About It!	TVOntario	Unknown

== Television shows ==
=== 1950s ===
- Country Canada (1954–2007)
- The Friendly Giant (1958–1985)
- Hockey Night in Canada (1952–present)
- The National (1954–present)
- Front Page Challenge (1957–1995)
- Wayne and Shuster Show (1958–1989)

=== 1960s ===
- CTV National News (1961–present)
- Land and Sea (1964–present)
- Man Alive (1967–2000)
- Mr. Dressup (1967–1996)
- The Nature of Things (1960–present, scientific documentary series)
- Question Period (1967–present, news program)
- Reach for the Top (1961–1985)
- The Tommy Hunter Show (1965–1992)
- W-FIVE (1966–present, newsmagazine program)

=== 1970s ===
- The Beachcombers (1972–1990)
- Canada AM (1972–present, news program)
- Celebrity Cooks (1975–1984)
- City Lights (1973–1989)
- Definition (1974–1989)
- the fifth estate (1975–present, newsmagazine program)
- Let's Go (1976–1984)
- The Littlest Hobo (1979–1985)
- Live It Up! (1978–1990)
- The Mad Dash (1978–1985)
- Marketplace (1972–present, newsmagazine program)
- Polka Dot Door (1971-1993)
- Second City Television (1976–1984)
- Smith & Smith (1979–1985)
- You Can't Do That on Television (1979–1990)
- 100 Huntley Street (1977–present, religious program)

=== 1980s ===
- Bizarre (1980–1985)
- The Edison Twins (1982–1986)
- The Frantics (1981–1984)
- Hangin' In (1981–1987)
- The Journal (1982–1992)
- Lorne Greene's New Wilderness (1982–1987)
- Seeing Things (1981–1987)
- Switchback (1981–1990)
- Today's Special (1982–1987)
- Thrill of a Lifetime (1981–1987)

== TV movies and miniseries ==
- Empire, Inc.
- I Am a Hotel
- Moving Targets
- Out of Sight, Out of Mind
- Ready for Slaughter
- Reasonable Force
- Stratasphere: Portrait of Teresa Stratas
- Rubberface
- The Undaunted

== Television stations ==
=== Debuts ===
Date	Market	Station	Channel	Affiliation	Notes/References
March	Regina, Saskatchewan	Saskatchewan Legislative Network	(cable-only)	Independent	
Unknown	Cardston, Alberta	CFSO-TV	32	Independent	
Unknown	Chéticamp, Nova Scotia	CHNE-TV	36	Independent	
Unknown	High Prairie, Alberta	CIRE-TV	12	Independent	
Unknown	Neepawa, Manitoba	CH5248	30	Community channel	Over-the-air relaunch of NAC TV
Unknown	Teslin, Yukon	CFTS-TV	6	Independent	
Unknown	Valemount, British Columbia	CHVC-TV-1	7	Independent	

=== Network affiliation changes ===
Date	Market	Station	Channel	Old affiliation	New affiliation	References
December 18	Carleton, Quebec	CHAU-TV	5	Radio-Canada	TVA	

== Births ==
Date	Name	Notability
March 31	Ashleigh Ball	Actress (My Little Pony: Friendship is Magic)
March 31	Noah Shebib	Former actor, music producer

== See also ==
- 1983 in Canada
- List of Canadian films of 1983
