= 2026–27 QMJHL season =

58th season of the QMJHL

- League: Quebec Maritimes Junior Hockey League
- Sport: Hockey
- Duration: Preseason; August 15, 2026 – September 12, 2026; Regular season September 18, 2026 – March 20, 2027; Playoffs; March 2027 – May 2027
- Teams: 18
- TV partner(s): Eastlink TV; TVA Sports; MATV; FloHockey

Draft

Regular season

Playoffs

QMJHL seasons
- 2025–26 2027–28

2026–27 CHL season
- League: Canadian Hockey League
- Sport: Hockey
- Duration: OHL; September 2026 – May 2027; QMJHL; September 2026 – May 2027; WHL; September 2026 – May 2027
- Teams: 61
- TV partner(s): RDS; TSN; Rogers TV

Memorial Cup

The 2025–26 QMJHL season is the 58th season of the Quebec Maritimes Junior Hockey League. The league is playing a 64-game regular season which began on September 18, 2026, and ends on March 20, 2027.

== Interleague schedule ==
On June 10, 2026, the QMJHL and the Ontario Hockey League announced eight interleague games between the two leagues.

2026-27 OHL/QMJHL schedule
Date	Away	Home	Arena
November 1	Val d'Or Foreurs	North Bay Battalion	Boart Longyear Memorial Gardens
November 1	Rouyn-Noranda Huskies	Sudbury Wolves	Sudbury Community Arena
November 20	Ottawa 67's	Gatineau Olympiques	Centre Slush Puppie
November 22	Blainville-Boisbriand Armada	Kingston Frontenacs	Slush Puppie Place
November 22	Gatineau Olympiques	Ottawa 67's	TD Place Arena
January 17	Kingston Frontenacs	Blainville-Boisbriand Armada	Centre d'Excellence Sports Rousseau
January 22	North Bay Battalion	Val d'Or Foreurs	Centre Agnico Eagle
February 21	Sudbury Wolves	Rouyn-Noranda Huskies	Aréna Glencore

== Regular season standings ==
Standings as of games through November 21, 2026.

Note: GP = Games played; W = Wins; L = Losses; OTL = Overtime losses; SL = Shootout losses; GF = Goals for; GA = Goals against; PTS = Points; x = clinched playoff berth; y = clinched conference title; z = clinched Jean Rougeau Trophy

=== Eastern Conference ===
Rank	Team	GP	W	L	OTL	SOL	Pts	ROW	GF	GA
1	Québec Remparts	22	16	5	1	0	33	16	87	59
2	Saint John Sea Dogs	23	15	5	1	2	33	13	88	73
3	Newfoundland Regiment	24	13	8	1	2	29	12	77	74
4	Halifax Mooseheads	21	11	6	3	1	26	9	74	75
5	Cape Breton Eagles	22	10	7	2	3	25	9	77	69
6	Chicoutimi Saguenéens	20	11	8	0	1	23	11	72	65
7	Moncton Wildcats	23	11	11	0	1	23	8	70	74
8	Rimouski Océanic	22	9	9	3	1	22	8	88	84
9	Charlottetown Islanders	23	9	12	2	0	20	7	77	102
10	Baie-Comeau Drakkar	22	5	16	0	1	11	4	50	88

=== Western Conference ===
Rank	Team	GP	W	L	OTL	SOL	Pts	ROW	GF	GA
1	Val-d'Or Foreurs	21	16	3	1	1	34	14	84	50
2	Victoriaville Tigres	22	15	6	0	1	31	14	93	87
3	Rouyn-Noranda Huskies	22	12	7	3	0	27	11	65	63
4	Sherbrooke Phœnix	20	11	5	3	1	26	11	75	57
5	Gatineau Olympiques	23	11	8	3	1	26	10	75	74
6	Drummondville Voltigeurs	21	10	9	0	2	22	9	73	76
7	Blainville-Boisbriand Armada	23	9	12	1	1	20	9	62	77
8	Shawinigan Cataractes	21	5	13	3	0	13	5	63	99

== Scoring leaders ==
These are the top ten skaters based on points. If there is a tie in points, goals take precedence over assists; if there is a tie in goals, players with fewer games played take precedence over those with more. Updated following games played on November 21, 2026.

Note: GP = Games played; G = Goals; A = Assists; Pts = Points; PIM = Penalty minutes

Player	Team	GP	G	A	Pts	PIM
Philippe Veilleux	Val-d'Or Foreurs	21	19	23	42	6
Thomas Desruisseaux	Victoriaville Tigres	22	13	23	36	12
Egor Shilov	Victoriaville Tigres	22	14	20	34	2
Chad Lygitsakos	Shawinigan Cataractes	21	10	21	31	20
Alexey Vlasov	Victoriaville Tigres	19	15	15	30	16
Liam Lefebvre	Cape Breton Eagles	20	14	14	28	30
Nathan Quinn	Québec Remparts	21	12	16	28	10
Mathys Dubé	Rimouski Océanic	22	14	13	27	18
A.J. Schaaf	Rimouski Océanic	21	10	16	26	16
Nathan Brisson	Val-d'Or Foreurs	21	6	20	26	33

== Leading goaltenders ==
These are the top five goaltenders based on goals against average who have played more than 40% of their team's total minutes. Updated following games played on November 21, 2026.

Note: GP = Games played; Mins = Minutes played; W = Wins; L = Losses: OTL = Overtime losses; SL = Shootout losses; GA = Goals Allowed; SO = Shutouts; GAA = Goals against average

Player	Team	GP	Mins	W	L	OTL	SOL	GA	SO	Sv%	GAA
Vincent Moreau	Val-d'Or Foreurs	11	605:57	8	2	0	1	22	1	.916	2.18
Alexandre Raymond	Rouyn-Noranda Huskies	16	964:57	9	5	2	0	37	2	.908	2.30
Arseni Radkov	Val-d'Or Foreurs	12	668:29	8	1	1	0	26	0	.917	2.33
Lucas Beckman	Cape Breton Eagles	16	954:39	8	6	1	1	39	1	.910	2.45
Justin Lee	Chicoutimi Saguenéens	10	513:07	5	4	0	0	21	1	.913	2.46

== See also ==
- List of QMJHL seasons
- 2026–27 OHL season
- 2026–27 WHL season

Preceded by 2025–26 QMJHL season	QMJHL seasons	Succeeded by 2027–28 QMJHL season
