= Television Rogers =

Television Rogers can refer to:

- Rogers Television, a network of community television in Canada
- Télévision Rogers, sister network in French
