= 2026–27 OHL season =

- League: Ontario Hockey League
- Sport: Hockey
- Duration: Preseason; August 28, 2026 – September 13, 2026; Regular season September 17, 2026 – March 21, 2027; Playoffs; March 2027 – May 2027
- Teams: 20
- TV partner(s): Rogers TV; YourTV; TSN; FloHockey

Draft

Playoffs

OHL seasons
- 2025–26 2027–28

2026–27 CHL season
- League: Canadian Hockey League
- Sport: Hockey
- Duration: OHL; September 2026 – May 2027; QMJHL; September 2026 – May 2027; WHL; September 2026 – May 2027
- Teams: 61
- TV partner(s): RDS; TSN; Rogers TV

Memorial Cup

The 2026–27 OHL season is the 47th season of operation (46th season of play) of the Ontario Hockey League. The league is playing a 68-game regular season which began on September 17, 2026, and will conclude on March 22, 2027. The post-season will begin in March 2027, and conclude in May 2027.

The team who wins the championship will win the J. Ross Robertson Cup and will represent the Ontario Hockey League at the 2027 Memorial Cup, which will be hosted by the Guelph Storm. The tournament will be held at the Sleeman Centre in Guelph, Ontario.

== Off-season ==
=== Seaway shootout ===
On April 2, the OHL announced the Seaway Shootout, a special two-game event bringing major junior hockey back to Cornwall, Ontario.

The Cornwall Civic Complex will host the Brampton Steelheads for two regular season games against the Ottawa 67's on October 16 and the Kingston Frontenacs on October 17.

=== Interleague schedule ===
On June 10, the OHL and the Quebec Maritimes Junior Hockey League announced eight interleague games between the two leagues.

2026-27 OHL/QMJHL schedule
Date	Away	Home	Arena
November 1	Val d'Or Foreurs	North Bay Battalion	Boart Longyear Memorial Gardens
November 1	Rouyn-Noranda Huskies	Sudbury Wolves	Sudbury Community Arena
November 20	Ottawa 67's	Gatineau Olympiques	Centre Slush Puppie
November 22	Blainville-Boisbriand Armada	Kingston Frontenacs	Slush Puppie Place
November 22	Gatineau Olympiques	Ottawa 67's	TD Place Arena
January 17	Kingston Frontenacs	Blainville-Boisbriand Armada	Centre d'Excellence Sports Rousseau
January 22	North Bay Battalion	Val d'Or Foreurs	Centre Agnico Eagle
February 21	Sudbury Wolves	Rouyn-Noranda Huskies	Aréna Glencore

=== Rivalry week ===
On June 10, the OHL announced the return of OHL Rivalry Week, as it highlights intense matchups in a four-day window from October 21 until October 25. The matchups featured a home-and-home between two familiar opponents.

The matchups included:

- Barrie Colts vs. Owen Sound Attack
- Brampton Steelheads vs. Brantford Bulldogs
- Erie Otters vs. Niagara IceDogs
- Flint Firebirds vs. Saginaw Spirit
- Guelph Storm vs. Kitchener Rangers
- Kingston Frontenacs vs. Ottawa 67's
- London Knights vs. Sarnia Sting
- North Bay Battalion vs. Sudbury Wolves
- Oshawa Generals vs. Peterborough Petes
- Sault Ste. Marie Greyhounds vs. Windsor Spitfires

== Pre-season ==
On July 7, 2026, the OHL announced the preseason schedule for the 2026–27 season. In total, there will be 53 preseason games which will begin on August 28 and conclude on September 13.

List of neutral site OHL pre-season games:

2026 OHL pre-season neutral site games
Date	Away	Home	City	Arena
August 29	Oshawa Generals	Owen Sound Attack	Barrie	Sadlon Arena
August 29	Erie Otters	London Knights	Watford	East Lambton Community Centre
August 30	Oshawa Generals	Brantford Bulldogs	Barrie	Sadlon Arena
August 31	Barrie Colts	Sudbury Wolves	King City	Zancor Centre
September 4	Kingston Frontenacs	Ottawa 67's	Cornwall	Cornwall Civic Complex
September 5	Peterborough Petes	Ottawa 67's	Arnprior	Bert Hall Arena
September 5	Erie Otters	Saginaw Spirit	Kitchener	Kitchener Memorial Auditorium
September 6	Oshawa Generals	Saginaw Spirit	Kitchener	Kitchener Memorial Auditorium
September 7	Saginaw Spirit	Kitchener Rangers	Elmira	Woolwich Memorial Centre
September 11	Niagara IceDogs	Erie Otters	Fort Erie	Fort Erie Recreation Complex
September 11	Windsor Spitfires	Flint Firebirds	Leamington	Leamington Community Centre
September 12	Niagara IceDogs	Peterborough Petes	Peterborough	Miskin Law Community Complex
September 12	Flint Firebirds	Windsor Spitfires	LaSalle	Vollmer Complex
September 12	Sudbury Wolves	Kingston Frontenacs	Newmarket	Ray Twinney Recreation Complex

The OHL will play interleague pre-season games against both the QMJHL and the WHL.

2026 OHL pre-season interleague games
Date	Away	Home	City	Arena
August 28	Saginaw Spirit	Newfoundland Regiment	Gander, NL	Steele Community Centre
August 29	Saginaw Spirit	Newfoundland Regiment	Grand Falls-Windsor, NL	Windsor Stadium
August 31	Saginaw Spirit	Newfoundland Regiment	Corner Brook, NL	Corner Brook Civic Centre
September 2	Rouyn-Noranda Huskies	Sudbury Wolves	Timmins	McIntyre Arena
September 4	London Knights	Victoria Royals	Victoria, BC	Save-On-Foods Memorial Centre
September 5	London Knights	Victoria Royals	Victoria, BC	Save-On-Foods Memorial Centre

OHL training camps began in late August in preparation of the 2026–27 season, which began on September 17, 2026.

== Regular season ==
=== Season standings ===
Note: DIV = Division; GP = Games played; W = Wins; L = Losses; OTL = Overtime losses; SL = Shootout losses; GF = Goals for; GA = Goals against;
PTS = Points; x = clinched playoff berth; y = clinched division title; z = clinched conference title
Standings as of November 22, 2026

==== Eastern conference ====
Rank	Team	DIV	GP	W	L	OTL	SOL	Pts	ROW	GF	GA
1	Brantford Bulldogs	East	24	16	7	0	1	33	15	94	66
2	Sudbury Wolves	Central	23	14	8	1	0	29	13	86	69
3	Kingston Frontenacs	East	25	15	9	0	1	31	15	102	90
4	Peterborough Petes	East	24	13	11	0	0	26	13	88	79
5	Ottawa 67's	East	23	10	10	3	0	23	9	69	82
6	Niagara IceDogs	Central	23	10	10	3	0	23	9	71	93
7	North Bay Battalion	Central	24	10	11	2	1	23	10	89	90
8	Oshawa Generals	East	23	7	11	4	1	19	6	70	89
9	Brampton Steelheads	Central	24	6	15	1	2	15	6	66	100
10	Barrie Colts	Central	25	5	17	3	0	13	4	57	98

==== Western conference ====
Rank	Team	DIV	GP	W	L	OTL	SOL	Pts	ROW	GF	GA
1	Guelph Storm	Midwest	23	19	4	0	0	38	19	102	63
2	Windsor Spitfires	West	25	15	7	2	1	33	15	90	72
3	Kitchener Rangers	Midwest	25	16	6	2	1	35	16	91	68
4	Sault Ste. Marie Greyhounds	West	26	14	10	2	0	30	13	87	89
5	Flint Firebirds	West	21	14	6	1	0	29	13	80	57
6	Erie Otters	Midwest	24	13	8	2	1	29	12	83	84
7	London Knights	Midwest	22	12	7	1	2	27	11	88	82
8	Saginaw Spirit	West	24	9	11	3	1	22	8	86	89
9	Sarnia Sting	West	25	10	13	2	0	22	10	91	101
10	Owen Sound Attack	Midwest	24	8	12	4	0	20	7	62	98

=== Scoring leaders ===
Note: GP = Games played; G = Goals; A = Assists; Pts = Points; PIM = Penalty minutes

Player	Team	GP	G	A	Pts	PIM
Dima Zhilkin	Saginaw Spirit	24	20	20	40	29
Ryan Roobroeck	Guelph Storm	21	19	19	38	14
Mclean Agrette	Erie Otters	24	10	25	35	2
Owen Griffin	Guelph Storm	21	9	25	34	20
Cameron Arquette	Kitchener Rangers	25	19	14	33	14
Michael Dec	Erie Otters	21	15	17	32	8
Braidy Wassilyn	Saginaw Spirit	24	13	19	32	2
Tanner Lam	Kitchener Rangers	25	11	20	31	10
Spencer Bowes	Ottawa 67's	22	17	13	30	18
Easton Walos	Sarnia Sting	24	12	18	30	10

=== Leading goaltenders ===
Note: GP = Games played; Mins = Minutes played; W = Wins; L = Losses: OTL = Overtime losses;
SL = Shootout losses; GA = Goals Allowed; SO = Shutouts; GAA = Goals against average

Player	Team	GP	MINS	W	L	OTL	SOL	GA	SO	Sv%	GAA
Zach Jovanovski	Guelph Storm	11	661	10	1	0	0	22	2	0.927	2.00
Michael Newlove	Windsor Spitfires	19	1122	10	6	2	1	45	4	0.901	2.41
Paolo Frasca	Sudbury Wolves	12	698	9	3	0	0	29	1	0.923	2.49
Vilmer Salen Forsberg	Brantford Bulldogs	15	880	8	5	0	1	38	1	0.917	2.59
Jason Schaubel	Kitchener Rangers	18	1081	11	4	2	1	48	1	0.899	2.66

== See also ==
- List of OHL seasons
- 2026–27 QMJHL season
- 2026–27 WHL season

Preceded by 2025–26 OHL season	OHL seasons	Succeeded by 2027–28 OHL season
