= PersonaTV =

Canadian cable television channel

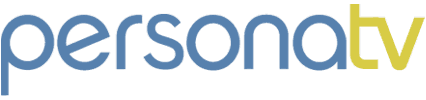

PersonaTV, a television production subsidiary of Canadian cable and telecommunications company Bragg Communications, operates cable community channel and real estate listing channels in television markets served by the Persona Cable division in Western Canada.

Unlike similar divisions such as Rogers Television or TVCogeco, the branding of Persona TV channels may vary according to the market. The channel serving the Grande Prairie, Alberta market is branded as Persona News 7, while other channels may be branded as MyTown or Persona TV.

== Defunct operations ==
In Persona's largest markets in Ontario, the primary community channel was branded as Persona News #, where # refers to the channel's placement on the cable dial. Persona News stations acted as local news channels, airing a rotation of community-oriented news and public interest reports. Persona News Channel operations also broadcast their local city council meetings, and when not airing live programming or news reports, ran a computer-generated community bulletin board of events listings, weather and other news that can be delivered graphically.

Persona News stations aired in Greater Sudbury, Saugeen Shores and Timmins. These channels were originally named News Channel #, and were rebranded as Persona News in 2007. Following Persona's 2009 rebranding as EastLink in Ontario, all three channels were rebranded as EastLink News.

In Sudbury and Timmins, Persona also aired separate channels for local real estate and advertising listings. The channel in Sudbury is branded as Home & Market Television, while the channel in Timmins is branded as ClaimPost Realty.

A more traditional community channel format, branded as MyTown, aired in Elliot Lake, Kapuskasing, Kirkland Lake, Sauble Beach, Temiskaming Shores and West Nipissing in Ontario, and Trinity-Conception Bay in Newfoundland and Labrador. All of these channels are now branded as EastLink Television.
