= Gordon Montador =

Canadian book editor and publishing executive

Gordon Montador (1950 - 1991) was a Canadian book editor and publishing executive. He was most noted as executive director of the Canadian Book Information Centre, a marketing and public relations agency which sought to publicize and promote Canadian literature.

Originally from Prince Rupert, British Columbia, he was educated at Carleton University before joining Macmillan of Canada as a sales representative. Openly gay, he was a prominent early activist as a host of Gay News and Views, one of Canada's first LGBT-oriented television series, and as an organizer of Gay Days, one of the precursors to the contemporary Pride Toronto. He established his reputation as an editor when the first book he ever edited, Oonah McFee's novel Sandbars, won the Books in Canada First Novel Award.

He subsequently spent some time in Los Angeles in 1979 and 1980, attempting to write a novel and helping his friends Norman Laurila and Richard Labonté to set up the city's LGBT bookstore A Different Light, but had returned to Canada as director of the Canadian Book Information Centre by 1983. In 1987, he acquired shares in the publishing firm Summerhill Press, a publisher of non-fiction titles. The company's most successful title, Sherman Hines's photography book Extraordinary Light: A Vision of Canada, enabled the company to announce in 1989 that it would try to expand its catalogue of books for the coming year.

Montador became gravely ill with AIDS in 1991, threatening the financial viability of Summerhill Press. He died on May 27, 1991, and by August Summerhill Press had been acquired by the Newfoundland-based firm Breakwater Books. In September, a group of his friends collaborated with the Writers' Trust of Canada to create the Gordon Montador Award, a literary award honouring non-fiction writing, in his memory. The award was presented until 1999, following which it was superseded by a reorganization of the Writers Trust awards program.
