= 2026–27 WHL season =

- League: Western Hockey League
- Sport: Ice hockey
- Duration: Regular season September 18, 2026 – March 28, 2027; Playoffs March 31, 2027 –
- Teams: 23
- TV partner(s): KRCW-TV, KZJO, CBC, TSN, RDS, Victory+

Regular season

Playoffs

Seasons
- 2025–26 2027–28

2026–27 CHL seasons
- League: Canadian Hockey League
- Sport: Ice hockey
- Duration: OHL September 2026–May 2027; QMJHL September 2026–May 2027; WHL September 2026–May 2027
- Teams: 61
- TV partner(s): CBC Television/Gem, TSN, RDS, Rogers TV

Memorial Cup

The 2026–27 WHL season is the 61st season of the Western Hockey League (WHL). The regular season begins on September 18, 2026.

This season will see some rule changes, and schedule changes, and a playoff format change:

- The league has extended the season by one week. The regular season will end on March 28th, and the playoffs will start on March 31st.
- For the first time, air travel will be permitted for one set of away games per team, under the following parameters: travel by bus must be longer than 10 hours, and it is permitted for inter-conference travel only.
- A "no return" 3-on-3 overtime pilot program, where during overtime, players will no longer be able to bring the puck back over the blue line. All 2026 WHL preseason games featured "no return" 3-on-3 overtime, regardless of the scope at the end of regulation, and WHL general managers voted on the implementation of the program for the regular season following the conclusion of the preseason. "No return" overtime was officially instated as a rule for the 2026–27 WHL regular season.
- With the change of the schedule, the 1st round of the playoffs will now be best out of 5.
- Coaches may request video reviews of goals scored by opposing teams where the defending team claims that the play should have been stopped due to an offside infraction at the blue line by the attacking team.
- After all major penalties and match penalties, except for fighting majors, referees must review video of the penalty to either confirm the penalty assessed or downgrade to a lesser penalty.

== Conference standings ==
Western Conference
Pos	Div	Team	Pld	W	L	OTL	SOL	GF	GA	Pts	PCT
1	U.S.	Spokane Chiefs	15	12	2	0	1	52	33	25	.833
2	B.C.	Vancouver Giants	18	10	5	1	2	69	50	23	.639
3	B.C.	Victoria Royals	15	11	4	0	0	63	50	22	.733
4	B.C.	Kamloops Blazers	17	10	5	2	0	57	49	22	.647
5	B.C.	Kelowna Rockets	16	6	3	4	3	49	47	19	.594
6	B.C.	Penticton Vees	17	8	8	0	1	47	47	17	.500
7	U.S.	Tri-City Americans	18	8	9	0	1	47	52	17	.472
8	U.S.	Portland Winterhawks	16	7	6	2	1	44	47	17	.531
9	U.S.	Everett Silvertips	19	6	8	1	4	39	56	17	.447
10	U.S.	Wenatchee Wild	16	6	9	1	0	38	47	13	.406
11	B.C.	Prince George Cougars	16	5	8	1	2	39	59	13	.406
12	U.S.	Seattle Thunderbirds	16	5	9	1	1	42	60	12	.375

Updated to match(es) played on October 18, 2026. Source: "2026-27 Regular Season Conference Standings". CHL.ca.

Eastern Conference
Pos	Div	Team	Pld	W	L	OTL	SOL	GF	GA	Pts	PCT
1	Central	Red Deer Rebels	19	12	4	1	2	74	58	27	.711
2	East	Brandon Wheat Kings	19	12	6	0	1	60	60	25	.658
3	Central	Medicine Hat Tigers	17	11	5	0	1	69	55	23	.676
4	East	Swift Current Broncos	18	11	7	0	0	58	59	22	.611
5	Central	Calgary Hitmen	18	10	7	0	1	71	63	21	.583
6	East	Saskatoon Blades	16	7	5	4	0	61	60	18	.563
7	East	Regina Pats	15	8	6	0	1	58	46	17	.567
8	Central	Lethbridge Hurricanes	17	8	8	1	0	53	64	17	.500
9	Central	Edmonton Oil Kings	15	7	5	2	1	46	49	17	.567
10	East	Prince Albert Raiders	18	7	8	1	2	56	75	17	.472
11	East	Moose Jaw Warriors	17	7	9	1	0	56	75	15	.441

Updated to match(es) played on November 09, 2026. Source: "2026-27 Regular Season Conference Standings". CHL.ca.

== Statistical leaders ==
=== Scoring leaders ===
These are the top ten skaters based on points. If there is a tie in points, goals take precedence over assists; if there is a tie in goals, players with fewer games played take precedence over those with more. Updated following games played on November 21, 2026.

Note: GP = Games played; G = Goals; A = Assists; Pts. = Points; PIM = Penalty minutes

Player	Team	GP	G	A	Pts	PIM
Poul Andersen	Red Deer Rebels	23	22	16	38	6
Beckett Hamilton	Red Deer Rebels	21	15	20	35	9
Kazden Mathies	Saskatoon Blades	20	12	20	32	10
Gavin Katz	Penticton Vees	24	15	16	31	8
Markus Ruck	Medicine Hat Tigers	19	7	24	31	12
Chase Harrington	Spokane Chiefs	19	8	22	30	41
Dayne Beuker	Lethbridge Hurricanes	22	14	15	29	2
Carter Sanderson	Calgary Hitmen	20	17	11	28	21
Mathis Preston	Vancouver Giants	20	15	13	28	14
Hunter Liang	Saskatoon Blades	20	12	16	28	5

== Attendance ==
=== Regular season ===
Home team	Home games	Average attendance	Total attendance
Spokane Chiefs	1	9,057	9,057
Saskatoon Blades	2	7,896	15,793
Everett Silvertips	4	5,949	23,796
Edmonton Oil Kings	3	4,951	14,854
Medicine Hat Tigers	2	4,741	9,482
Seattle Thunderbirds	2	4,612	9,224
Kelowna Rockets	2	4,514	9,028
Portland Winterhawks	3	3,971	11,915
Regina Pats	1	3,931	3,931
Prince George Cougars	3	3,698	11,094
Kamloops Blazers	2	3,693	7,386
Red Deer Rebels	2	3,667	7,334
Victoria Royals	3	3,626	10,879
Vancouver Giants	3	3,613	10,840
Penticton Vees	3	3,343	10,031
Lethbridge Hurricanes	4	3,327	13,308
Tri-City Americans	2	3,160	6,320
Brandon Wheat Kings	2	3,034	6,068
Calgary Hitmen	3	2,924	8,774
Prince Albert Raiders	3	2,758	8,274
Wenatchee Wild	2	2,639	5,278
Moose Jaw Warriors	3	2,479	7,430
Swift Current Broncos	2	2,154	4,308
League	57	3,935	224,332

== See also ==
- List of WHL seasons
- 2026–27 OHL season
- 2026–27 QMJHL season
- 2027 Memorial Cup

Preceded by 2025–26 WHL season	WHL seasons	Succeeded by 2027–28 WHL season
