= Persona Communications =

Defunct Canadian telecommunications company

- Industry: telecommunications
- Founded: 1986
- Fate: Acquired by Eastlink
- Key people: Brendan Paddick
- Products: cable television, high speed internet, telephone
- Website: www.persona.ca

Persona Communications, formerly Regional Cablesystems, was a cable television, Internet and telecommunications provider in Canada.

Persona was purchased by EastLink in 2007. At that point it ceased to be an independent company, and the Persona name survived only as the brand name of some of EastLink's operations in Western Canada, before the transition to the EastLink brand was completed in 2010. Other brands used included Coast Cable along the Sunshine Coast, Delta Cable near the Fraser River Delta, and Northern Cablevision in parts of rural Alberta.

Until its takeover by EastLink, Persona was the fifth largest cable television provider in Canada, following Shaw, Rogers, Vidéotron and Cogeco.

== History ==
As Regional Cablesystems, the company began operations in 1986 in Newfoundland. It expanded through the acquisition of non-metropolitan cable systems in Canada through the 1990s — notably Northern Cable in 1998, which gave the company two of the largest markets, Sudbury and Timmins, that it ever served as an independent company — and changed its corporate name to Persona in 2001.

Formerly traded on the Toronto Stock Exchange, the publicly listed company went private in 2004 when it was bought by Dallas-based Hicks Muse Tate & Furst Inc. (now HM Capital), TD Capital Canadian Private Equity Partners (now Birch Hill Equity Partners) and CIBC World Markets Inc.

On May 4, 2007, EastLink announced a purchase offer for Persona, for an undisclosed price. The deal was approved by the Canadian Radio-television and Telecommunications Commission (CRTC) later that year. Persona's cable services in Newfoundland and Labrador were rebranded in 2008 as EastLink, although systems elsewhere in Canada remained branded as Persona. In May 2009, this rebranding was extended to Ontario and Quebec. The Persona name was still used in parts of Western Canada until 2010.

On July 1, 2009, Eastlink sold Persona's cable operations in Saskatchewan to Access Communications.

== Other operations ==
In 2005, several longtime executives of Persona Cable, including former CEO Brendan Paddick, moved on to construct and develop a Caribbean-based cable provider named Columbus Communications, which currently operates in The Bahamas, Barbados, Grenada, Jamaica and Trinidad and Tobago. Persona also formerly owned Cable Bahamas, a cable operator in the Bahamas which is now part of Columbus. In 2015 Columbus Communications was acquired by Cable & Wireless Communications.

The company's PersonaTV division operated local cable community channels in the markets Persona served, although the channels' branding varied depending on the market.

The company launched cable Internet services in 2001 through a partnership with Sudbury-based ISP Cyberbeach. The following year, Persona directly acquired Cyberbeach. Persona also offered dial-up Internet service in some markets, including both North Bay and Sault Ste. Marie, which were not served by Persona's cable division.
