= CJTR-FM =

Community radio station in Regina, Saskatchewan

Coordinates: 50°27′18″N 104°36′33″W

- Regina, Saskatchewan; Canada
- Frequency: 91.3 MHz
- Branding: AccessNow Radio 91.3

Programming
- Format: Community radio

Ownership
- Owner: Access Communications

History
- First air date: November 1, 2001

Technical information
- Class: A
- ERP: 480 watts
- HAAT: 94.2 metres (309 ft)

Links
- Website: accessnowradio.ca

CJTR-FM (91.3 FM, "AccessNow Radio 91.3") is a Canadian radio station, airing at 91.3 FM in Regina, Saskatchewan. Owned by Access Communications, the station airs a community radio format featuring a mix of music, talk, and multicultural programming.

This station is run primarily by volunteers, supported financially by some Regina-area sponsors and by fundraisers. It also, in part, serves as an unofficial campus radio station for the University of Regina, actively soliciting volunteer participation among the university's student body as the school does not have its own campus radio station.

== History ==
Until CJTR signed on, Regina was the largest market in Canada without either a campus or community radio station. An attempt in 1995 to incorporate a campus radio station at the University of Regina was abandoned for financial reasons, and as a result of that project's failure, a non-profit known as Radius Communications continued to pursue a community radio license.

On February 8, 2001, the Canadian Radio-television and Telecommunications Commission (CRTC) approved an application by Radius for a new community radio station on 91.3 FM.

CJTR derives most of its revenue from the sale of advertising between shows. It also hosts annual fundraisers, including radiothons and a garage sale oriented towards music and related items.

The COVID-19 pandemic severely impacted CJTR's operations due to a decline in advertising, with its revenue having decreased by 50%. The station was also impacted by the Online News Act, which prohibited its Facebook page from being available in Canada and thus hindered the reach of its fundraising activities.

On April 16, 2024, CTJR's members accepted an offer for the station to be acquired by local cable provider and telecom cooperative Access Communications; Access does not plan any major changes to the station's staff or programming, and foresaw synergies between CJTR and its community channel AccessNow. The existing board of directors will be maintained as an advisory board. In July 2024, CJTR relocated its studios from the GMC Building to Access Communications' headquarters on Park Street. The sale was approved by the CRTC in December 2024.

== Notes ==
CJTR was formerly the callsign of a now-defunct AM radio station in Trois-Rivières, Quebec.
