= 10% QTV =

Canadian television newsmagazine series

10% QTV is a Canadian television newsmagazine series, which aired on Rogers Television stations in Ontario from 1995 to 2001. It was the first multiseason television series in Canada targeted specifically to the lesbian, gay, bisexual and transgender community, being preceded only by short run series such as Coming Out in 1972, and Out of the Closets and Gay News and Views in 1977–1978.

The series aired on all Rogers community channels in Southern and Eastern Ontario. In 1996, the series was also briefly carried nationally by Vision TV.

The series first aired in 1995 as Cable 10%, and adopted the 10% QTV name in 1997. The series was produced in Toronto by a volunteer committee. It aired documentary and feature reports on LGBT life and news in Canada and internationally, including an annual episode airing highlights from the Toronto Pride Parade.

Following the end of the series, the Canadian Lesbian and Gay Archives took over the program's website, incorporating it into the CLGA's own website.
