= Emanuel Xavier =

American poet (born 1970)

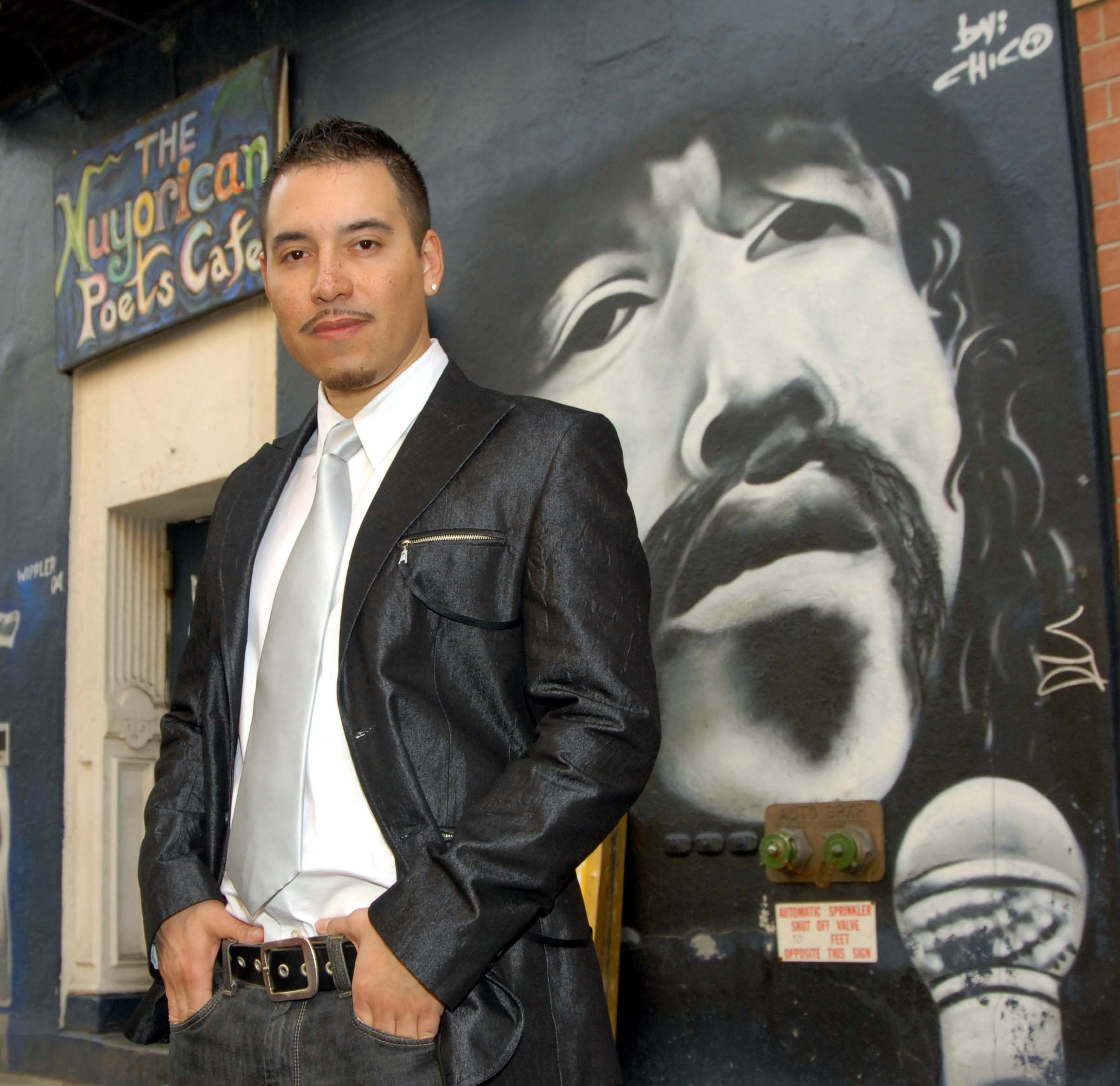
- Emanuel Xavier outside Nuyorican Poets Cafe (2008)
- Born: May 3, 1970 (age 56); Brooklyn, New York, U.S.
- Spouse: Brian Berger (m. 2018)
- Parent(s): Mercedes Tapia, Augusto Granja
- Website: https://www.emanuelxavier.org/

Emanuel Xavier (born May 3, 1970), is an American poet, spoken word artist, author, editor, screenwriter, and LGBTQ activist born and raised in the Bushwick neighborhood of Brooklyn, New York. Associated with the East Village arts scene in New York City, he emerged from the ball culture scene and became one of the first openly gay poets associated with the Nuyorican movement, as well as an advocate for LGBTQ youth and Latino literature. His work has appeared in POETRY, Poets.org, and Latino Poetry: The Library of America Anthology.

== Early years and education ==
Born Emanuel Xavier Granja in Brooklyn, New York, Xavier was raised in the Bushwick neighborhood by his Ecuadorian mother after his father left shortly after learning of the pregnancy. Bushwick at the time was a predominantly immigrant neighborhood composed largely of Puerto Rican, Black, and Italian residents. Xavier has spoken publicly about experiencing sexual abuse as a child by a family member.

During school integration efforts in New York City, Xavier was bussed to a predominantly white elementary school in Queens, where he experienced racism. At age sixteen, after coming out as gay to his mother and her boyfriend, he was forced to leave home. He survived as an underage sex worker along the Christopher Street piers on Manhattan's West Side and later became associated with the House of Xtravaganza within New York City's ballroom scene, forming relationships with individuals later featured in the documentary Paris Is Burning.

Xavier later returned home and completed his diploma at Grover Cleveland High School (Queens). He attended St. John's University, where he studied communications before leaving school and relocating to Manhattan's West Village. He later worked at the LGBTQ bookstore A Different Light, where he became involved in queer literary and arts communities. Xavier has stated that poetry became an outlet through which he processed trauma, identity, and anger.

== Professional career ==
In the mid-1990s, Xavier helped introduce spoken word poetry to LGBTQ+ audiences by organizing the monthly series Realness & Rhythms in the basement of A Different Light in New York City. He self-published his first chapbook, Pier Queen, in 1997. The collection has been noted for thematic similarities to works such as Tongues Untied by Marlon Riggs.

With encouragement from ballroom figure Willi Ninja, Xavier founded the House of Xavier in 1998 and launched the annual Glam Slam competition. Originally hosted at the Nuyorican Poets Cafe and later the Bowery Poetry Club, Glam Slam combined ballroom performance and spoken word poetry, at times collaborating with the House of Xtravaganza.

His autofiction novel Christ Like was published by Painted Leaf Press in 1999 and shortlisted for a Lambda Literary Award in the Small Press category. The novel was reissued by Rebel Satori Press in 2009 as a tenth-anniversary edition.

Following the September 11 attacks, Xavier helped organize Words to Comfort, a poetry benefit held at The New School. His poem "September Song" was archived on the original National September 11 Memorial & Museum website and later appeared in his 2002 poetry collection Americano.

Xavier hosted the 14th annual Lambda Literary Awards in 2002. His visibility in spoken word and LGBTQ+ media led to appearances on Russell Simmons Presents Def Poetry, hosting duties on In The Life alongside Laverne Cox, and appearances in the documentary How Do I Look and the feature film The Ski Trip.

Xavier edited the anthologies Bullets & Butterflies: Queer Spoken Word Poetry (2005) and Mariposas: A Modern Anthology of Queer Latino Poetry (2008), receiving a Lambda Literary Award nomination for the former. In 2010, El Museo del Barrio presented a choreographed dance work inspired by his spoken word album Legendary.

His poetry collection If Jesus Were Gay was published in 2010 and noted for its religious imagery and exploration of sexuality and spirituality. He later published Nefarious in 2013, delivered a TEDxBushwick talk in 2015, and released Radiance in 2016.

Xavier participated in events organized by the Stonewall Inn Gives Back Initiative during the 50th anniversary of the Stonewall riots in 2019. He also helped establish the Penguin Random House LGBTQ Network in 2011.

Selected Poems of Emanuel Xavier was published in 2021. Xavier joined the board of The Publishing Triangle in 2022. His poetry collection Love(ly) Child was published in 2023 and earned him a third Lambda Literary Award nomination.

In 2024, Xavier's poem "Old Pro" appeared in POETRY magazine. That same year, his poem "How Some of Us Survived / Cuando El Mundo Did Not Want Us" was featured by the Academy of American Poets on Poets.org. His poem "Madre America" was also included in Latino Poetry: The Library of America Anthology, edited by Rigoberto Gonzalez.

Xavier appeared at the Geraldine R. Dodge Poetry Festival in 2024 and has performed his poem "Americano" with percussionist Bobby Sanabria.

In November 2025, actor Christopher Rivas performed Xavier's poem "Americano" as part of Voices of a People's History: The People Speak and Sing! during the 2025 Diversity & Inclusion Film Festival at Lincoln Center.

Still, We Are Sacred was published in 2026. The book's launch event was held at the Stonewall National Monument Visitor Center and featured filmmaker Jennie Livingston.

== Activism ==
Drawing from his experiences as a formerly homeless queer youth, Xavier has organized and participated in benefit events supporting organizations including Sylvia Rivera's Place and the Ali Forney Center. He has also been involved with LGBTQ+ and HIV/AIDS advocacy groups including the ACT UP Latino Caucus, the Latino Commission on AIDS, Men of All Colors Together/New York (MACT/NY), and Marriage Equality New York (MENY).

In 2017, PEN America invited Xavier to read his poem "Americano" during the Writers Resist rally held on the steps of The New York Public Library in protest of the Trump administration. That same year, a week-long exhibition commemorated the 20th anniversary of his poetry collection Pier Queen.

In 2018, Xavier presented his poetry at the United Nations during the International Symposium on Cultural Diplomacy, where he debuted a poem addressing gun violence.

== Assault and aftermath ==
In October 2005, Xavier was the victim of a violent anti-gay assault by a group of approximately twenty men in the Bushwick neighborhood of Brooklyn. Following the attack, he was diagnosed with an acoustic neuroma, a benign brain tumor, and underwent surgery that resulted in temporary partial facial paralysis. Although he later regained mobility, the procedure left him deaf in his right ear.

In 2015, Xavier announced that the acoustic neuroma had recurred and later underwent radiosurgery.

== Awards and honors ==
In 2010, the Equality Forum named Xavier an LGBTQ History Month Icon.

The American Library Association selected Xavier's poetry collections If Jesus Were Gay and Nefarious for its Over the Rainbow book lists in 2011 and 2015, respectively.

Xavier's books Radiance, Selected Poems of Emanuel Xavier, and Love(ly) Child, as well as the anthology Me No Habla With Acento: Contemporary Latino Poetry, received recognition from the International Latino Book Awards. Three of his books were finalists for Lambda Literary Awards: the novel Christ Like, the anthology Bullets & Butterflies: Queer Spoken Word Poetry, and the poetry collection Love(ly) Child.

He is the recipient of a Gay City Impact Award and the Marsha A. Gomez Cultural Heritage Award.

Xavier has served as a judge for the Lambda Literary Awards and as a poetry judge for the 2023 Saints & Sinners LGBTQ+ Literary Festival. He was inducted into the Saints & Sinners LGBTQ+ Literary Festival Hall of Fame in 2023.

In 2025, Xavier participated in a Lambda Literary Retreat screenwriting cohort mentored by Steven Canals.

In 2026, Xavier was awarded a fellowship residency at the Virginia Center for the Creative Arts based on an excerpt from his memoir.

== Bibliography ==
=== Poetry ===
- Pier Queen, Rebel Satori Press, 1997; expanded edition published 2012
- Americano, Rebel Satori Press, 2002; reissued 2022
- If Jesus Were Gay, Rebel Satori Press, 2010; reissued 2020
- Nefarious, Rebel Satori Press, 2013
- Radiance, Rebel Satori Press, 2016
- Selected Poems of Emanuel Xavier, Rebel Satori Press, 2021
- Love(ly) Child, Rebel Satori Press, 2023
- Still, We Are Sacred, Rebel Satori Press, 2026

=== Fiction ===
- Christ Like, Painted Leaf Press, 1999; reissued by Rebel Satori Press, 2009

=== Edited collections ===
- Bullets & Butterflies: Queer Spoken Word Poetry, suspect thoughts press, 2005
- Mariposas: A Modern Anthology of Queer Latino Poetry, Floricanto Press, 2008
- Me No Habla With Acento: Contemporary Latino Poetry, El Museo del Barrio and Rebel Satori Press, 2011

=== Anthologies featuring work ===
- Queer & Catholic, edited by Trebor Healey and Amie M. Evans, Haworth Press, 2008
- Ambientes: New Queer Latino Writing, edited by Lázaro Lima and Felice Picano, University of Wisconsin Press, 2011
- collective BRIGHTNESS: LGBTIQ Poets on Faith, Religion & Spirituality, edited by Kevin Simmonds, Sibling Rivalry Press, 2011
- Born This Way: Real Stories of Growing Up Gay, edited by Paul Vitagliano, Quirk Books, 2012
- For Colored Boys Who Have Considered Suicide When the Rainbow is Still Not Enough, edited by Keith Boykin, Magnus Books, 2012
- Studs, edited by Richard Labonte, Cleis Press, 2014
- Untangling the Knot: Queer Voices on Marriage, Relationships & Identity, edited by Carter Sickels, Ooligan Press, 2015
- If You Can Hear This: Poems in Protest of an American Inauguration, edited by Bryan Borland, Sibling Rivalry Press, 2017
- Nepantla: An Anthology Dedicated to Queer Poets of Color, edited by Christopher Soto, Nightboat Press, 2018
- Latino Poetry: The Library of America Anthology, edited by Rigoberto Gonzalez, Library of America, 2024
- Just YA: Short Poems, Essays, & Fiction for Grades 7–12, edited by Sarah J. Donovan, Oklahoma State University Libraries, 2024
- Poets for Harris: A Poetry Anthology, edited by James Morehead, Viewless Wings Press, 2024

=== Literary journals and online publications ===
- "Old Pro", POETRY, 2024
- "How Some of Us Survived / Cuando El Mundo Did Not Want Us", Poets.org, 2024
- Featured contributor, Tulip Wolf Journal, vol. 4

=== Collaborative and featured works ===
- A Tale of Two Cities: Disco Era Bushwick, photographs by Meryl Meisler, Bizarre Publishing, 2014
- Purgatory & Paradise: Sassy '70s Suburbia & The City, photographs by Meryl Meisler, Bizarre Publishing, 2015
- Paradise Lost: Bushwick Era Disco, photographs by Meryl Meisler, Bizarre Publishing, 2021

== Discography ==
- Legendary The Spoken Word Poetry of Emanuel Xavier, ELKAT Productions, 2010
- Legendary (The RE-Mixes), Hades Music, 2010
- Sound X, Royal Advisor Records, 2011
- Pulse, Nymphs & Thugs Recording Co., 2021
- World Out There, Supaqween Records, 2023
