= I Am a Hotel =

- Directed by: Allan F. Nicholls
- Written by: Leonard Cohen; Mark Shekter
- Produced by: Barrie Wexler; Moses Znaimer
- Starring: Leonard Cohen; Celia Franca; Alberta Watson; Toller Cranston
- Narrated by: Leonard Cohen
- Music by: Leonard Cohen
- Production company: Blue Memorial Video Ltd.
- Distributed by: Canadian Broadcasting Corporation (CBC); Morningstar Entertainment
- Release date: 1983
- Running time: 28 minutes
- Country: Canada
- Language: English

I Am a Hotel is a 1983 Canadian made for TV short musical film, written by Leonard Cohen and Mark Shekter and directed by Allan F. Nicholls.

The storyline is based on imaginary events in the King Edward Hotel in Toronto, and the guests' (usually romantic) interactions with each other.

== Production ==
Leonard Cohen had the idea for the film based upon his personal experiences and his song "The Guests". It was originally intended for the Canadian pay TV network C-Channel, but when the network collapsed, the production was completed by Citytv with financial assistance from Canadian Broadcasting Corporation (CBC) and the Canadian Film Development Corporation.

=== Scenes ===
Cohen features frequently, as an amused bystander ('the Resident'). Extensive dance routines in scenes 2 and 3 were choreographed by Ann(e) Ditchburn, who also dances as the Gypsy wife in scene 3. There are five scenes, each based on a Cohen song.

1. "The Guests" in which the characters enter via the lobby and are taken to their rooms; The bellboy and chambermaid meet in the corridor; and the manager and his wife apparently have angry words in the lobby after which she strides off.
2. "Memories" (in which the bellboy pursues the chambermaid around the laundry and ballroom)
3. "The Gypsy Wife" (in which the manager's wife, in fetching attire, dances on the boardroom table)
4. "Chelsea Hotel #2" (in which the two lovers try, and fail, to have sex, and the admiral and diva at last face each other across the hallway)
5. "Suzanne" (in which scenes of Suzanne with Cohen are interspersed with shots of the two couples reunited and dancing together, and the hotel manager distraught and then drinking at the bar)

A short epilogue repeats the opening material from 'The Guests'. The final credits give the makers as 'Blue Memorial Video Ltd' and dedicate the piece to David Blue (1941-1982).

== Cast ==
- Leonard Cohen as The Resident
- Celia Franca as The Diva
- Alberta Watson as Suzanne
- Toller Cranston as The Manager
- Claudia Moore as Chambermaid
- Daniel Allman as Young Lover
- Samantha Logan as Young Lover
- Robert Desrosiers as The Bellboy
- Anne Ditchburn as The Gypsy Wife
- Leo Leyden as The Admiral

== Release ==
The film was released on video in 1996.

== Recognition ==
The film won a Golden Rose international television award at the 1984 Montreux TV festival in Montreux, Switzerland.
