= Access Communications =

Canadian telecom cooperative

Access Communications Co-operative Limited
- Trade name: Access Communications
- Formerly: Cable Regina
- Type: Co-operative
- Industry: Telecommunications
- Founded: 1974; 52 years ago (as Regina Cablevision Co-operative Ltd.); Regina, Saskatchewan, Canada
- Headquarters: Regina, Saskatchewan
- Area served: Saskatchewan
- Key people: Carmela Haines (CEO) Derrick Thue (CFO) Craig Van Ham (CTO)
- Products: Cable television, high-speed internet, telephone, home security, broadcasting
- Number of employees: 350+

Access Communications Co-operative Limited is a Canadian telecom cooperative based in Regina, Saskatchewan. The cooperative provides internet, cable television, telephone, smart home and security services to residential and business customers in 235 Saskatchewan communities. Its primary wireline competitor is the provincial crown corporation SaskTel; it is one of two cable providers in Saskatchewan, with Rogers Xfinity (formerly Shaw) primarily serving areas such as Moose Jaw, Prince Albert, Saskatoon, and Swift Current.

== History ==
Access Communications was established in 1974 as the Regina Cablevision Co-operative. After a prolonged legal and constitutional dispute between the federal and the provincial governments, which had differing visions of how cable television should be delivered in the province, the co-operative was granted a Canadian Radio-television and Telecommunications Commission (CRTC) licence for broadcast in 1976 and began providing cable television services as Cable Regina on February 14, 1978. More than 24,000 households in Regina signed up for cable services in its first years of operations.

After nearly two decades focusing solely on cable television and local broadcasting, the co-operative launched dial-up internet service in September 1995 and cable modem broadband service followed in 1997. Cable Regina diversified and extended its reach into other areas of the province in the 1990s through the acquisition of other cable television providers in Regina Beach, White City, Weyburn, Estevan and Yorkton. On April 17, 2000, the co-operative's name changed to Access Communications. In the early 2000s, Access Communications merged with the Battlefords Community Cablevision. Primary line telephone services were launched in 2007.

Looking to further expand its presence in smaller communities, Access Communications purchased Persona's cable operations in Saskatchewan from Halifax-based Eastlink in 2009, becoming the largest cable television provider in the province. In 2015, Access Communications acquired Askivision and Saskatoon-based Little Loon Wireless; the purchase of the latter allowed the co-operative to deliver fixed-wireless broadband high-speed internet to rural areas in Saskatchewan.

== Services ==
Access Communications offers cable modem and fixed-wireless broadband internet, cable television (digital and analog), telephone, home security and home automation.

=== Internet ===
Access uses a hybrid fibre-coaxial (HFC) network infrastructure to deliver its internet services, branded as AccessHyperSpeed. In March 2019, it announced that it is one of the internet service providers participating in the federal government's Connecting Families Program.

=== Cable television ===
Access distributes standard-definition and high-definition cable television programming, including digital cable. It offers digital video recorders such as TiVo, video-on-demand services and has implemented switched digital video (SDV) technology in many markets.

=== Telephone ===
Access Communications' digital phone service was launched in February 2007 and utilizes IP technology instead of a traditional landline. Such a system operates on an ATA (Analog Telephony Adapter) device with a built-in cable modem. The modem communicates over cable lines to a private IP network. In this sense, it can be considered VoIP, in that it is voice delivered over an IP network. However, because it travels over dedicated lines, it is still designed to be usable in a power outage scenario.

=== Home security ===
Access offers home security and home automation services. In 2016, an Alarm.com-based home automation monitored service was introduced. Subscribers can secure and monitor their property through web-based and mobile applications, as well as through Apple, Amazon and Google devices.

== Broadcasting ==
=== AccessNow TV ===
Access operates community channels on its cable systems branded as AccessNow TV (formerly Access7), which have carried locally produced programs and events, including programs highlighting multicultural, Indigenous and LGBT communities in Saskatchewan.

The channels adopted their current name in September 2020. Its sports coverage includes broadcasts of the Regina Pats and other Western Hockey League games. Its first agreement with the Western Hockey League was signed in 1993.

=== Radio ===
In April 2024, the members of Regina-based community radio station CJTR-FM accepted an offer to be acquired by Access; the station will relocate its studios to the Access headquarters in Regina and build synergies with AccessNow TV, while retaining its existing programming, staff, and volunteers.

== Structure ==
Access Communications operates as a not-for-profit co-operative and its brand focuses on its community-based ownership, reinvesting its revenues on service improvements, as well as promoting and supporting local events and community organizations. It has a charity, the Access Communications Children's Fund, as well as a scholarship program. In 2019, the co-operative supported close to 2,000 community groups and was recognized as one of Canada's Best Diversity Employers, one of Saskatchewan Top 100 Companies and was named a Caring Company by Imagine Canada in 2017.

== See also ==
- List of VOIP companies
- List of internet service providers in Canada
