= CHMG-DT =

Television station in Quebec City

- Quebec City, Quebec; Canada
- Channels: Digital: 10 (VHF); Virtual: 10
- Branding: Télé-Mag Canal 10

Programming
- Affiliations: Independent

Ownership
- Owner: Télé-Mag inc.

History
- Founded: 1979
- First air date: October 20, 2005
- Former call signs: CHMG-TV (2005–2020)
- Former channel numbers: Analog: 9 (VHF, until 2020)
- Call sign meaning: CH Mag

Technical information
- Licensing authority: CRTC
- ERP: 33 W
- HAAT: 118.8 m (390 ft)
- Transmitter coordinates: 46°46′16″N 71°16′56″W

Links
- Website: Télé-Mag Website (In French)

CHMG-DT (channel 10) is a low-power independent community television station in Quebec City, Quebec, Canada, owned by Télé-Mag inc. The station's studios are located on Jean-Perrin Street, along Autoroutes 40/73 in Les Rivières, and its transmitter is located at Place de la Cité in Sainte-Foy.

CHMG-DT is branded on air as Télé-Mag, which is a portmanteau of "television" and "magazine".

== History ==
Telemag's former logo

Télé-Mag first broadcast in 1979 as cable-only "Télé-Plus 24"; it was renamed "Télé-Mag 24" in 1994. The "24" in the name represented the cable channel position at the time, on channel 24; it has since moved to channel 10.

In August 2003, the Canadian Radio-television and Telecommunications Commission (CRTC) granted Télé-Mag a low-power terrestrial broadcast licence on channel 9, under the calls CHMG-TV. Broadcasting only at 38 watts, the broadcast station launched on October 20, 2005.

== Technical information ==
=== Subchannel ===
Télé-Mag HD logo

Subchannel of CHMG-DT
Channel	Res.	Short name	Programming
10.1	1080i		Main CHMG-DT programming

=== Analog-to-digital transition ===
The station began broadcasting in high-definition via cable television in December 2010.

As CHMG-TV's transmitter is low power, it was not subject to the required analog television shutdown and digital conversion, which took place on August 31, 2011. The station flash-cut to digital sometime in 2020.
