= CHNE-TV =

Television station in Chéticamp, Nova Scotia

Coordinates: 46°36′24.12″N 61°3′11.88″W

Chéticamp, Nova Scotia; Canada
- Channels: Analog: 25 (UHF)

Programming
- Affiliations: Independent

Ownership
- Owner: Acadian Communications, Limited

History
- Former channel number: 36
- Call sign meaning: Chéticamp, Nouvelle-Écosse ("Nova Scotia" in French)

Technical information
- ERP: 0.02 kW

Links
- Website: CHNE-TV on Facebook

CHNE-TV (channel 25) is a community channel in Chéticamp, Nova Scotia, Canada.

In 1999, the station moved from channel 29 to 39. Its license was renewed in 2020.
