= TVNB =

Television station in New Brunswick

TVNB Logo

TVNB, or Television New Brunswick, was the brand of a group of cable television community channels in the Canadian province of New Brunswick, active in the late 1990s. The network was created by uniting the various local community channels of the province's cable television provider, Fundy Cable. Network master control located in Moncton provided two provincial feeds (English and French) of programs produced around New Brunswick, including sporting events and provincial political coverage of the Legislative Assembly of New Brunswick, while local programming inserts were made for local content like TV bingo games, high school sports, city council meetings and municipal election debates.

TVNB English service was available in the majority of the province, except the Edmundston area which provided the French TV service. English and French TVNB service could be seen on two separate channels in Moncton, Miramichi, Bathurst, Campbellton and Dalhousie.

The TVNB network was re-branded Rogers Television in February 2002, after a series of acquisitions made Rogers Cable the dominant cable provider in the province.
