= A Different Light (bookstore) =

LGBT bookstore chain that operated from 1979 to 2011

- Company type: Private
- Industry: Bookselling
- Founded: October 1979
- Founder: George Leigh; Norman Laurila
- Defunct: 2011
- Fate: Closed
- Headquarters: Los Angeles, California, United States
- Area served: United States
- Key people: George Leigh; Norman Laurila; Richard Labonté
- Products: LGBT literature

A Different Light was a chain of four LGBT bookstores in the United States, active from 1979 to 2011.

== History ==
George Leigh, a Toronto attorney met Norman Laurila, an employee of Toronto's Glad Day Bookshop in 1976. Leigh was impressed enough with Laurila's knowledge of LGBT literature and business acumen that in 1978 he suggested they look at opening a specialty bookstore in the U.S. Several cities were considered - Atlanta, New York, Chicago and Los Angeles, but Laurila quickly narrowed it down to Los Angeles as the best bet for a new startup. It was felt that the Los Angeles gay and lesbian community both needed and was able to support a specialty gay and lesbian bookstore. Leigh and Laurila formed an equal partnership, with Leigh providing 75% of the startup costs and Laurila providing the rest, with the understanding that Laurila would move to Los Angeles and manage the store.

Laurila and his then-partner Richard Labonté moved to Los Angeles to open the book store. At the time, Labonté was a journalist for the Ottawa Citizen. Leigh remained in Ontario, where he was a corporate lawyer for Texaco's Canadian division. The name of the bookstore came from the title of the novel A Different Light by science fiction author Elizabeth Lynn, suggested by Labonté. Gordon Montador, Laurila's close friend from Toronto, decided to take a year off from work to write his first novel in Los Angeles, and he was instrumental in helping set up A Different Light. His ideas and enthusiasm made the first year very successful.

The first A Different Light Bookstore opened at 4014 Santa Monica Blvd. in Los Angeles' Silver Lake neighborhood in October 1979, followed by a branch in New York City's Greenwich Village in 1983 and a branch in San Francisco's Castro (489 Castro St.) district in 1985. In May 1990, a second Los Angeles store opened at 8853 Santa Monica Blvd. in West Hollywood, and the New York City store moved from its original location on 548 Hudson Street to 151 19th Street in Chelsea, Manhattan. Supplanted by the West Hollywood store, the original store in Silver Lake closed in 1992.

For 22 years, the stores were immensely successful and influential. By the time ADL moved to Chelsea in New York City, it was hosting over 300 author events a year in its three stores. Each store became a serious part of the local LGBT community and fostered the careers of many LGBT authors. At its zenith, it employed over 80 people.

== Apex ==
At its height, the chain was one of the most influential LGBT booksellers in the United States, serving as a cultural hub and social center for LGBT people. It hosted events including author readings, art shows, reading groups, writing conferences, art exhibitions and panel discussions. In the mid-1970s, mass market publisher Avon was the largest publisher of gay and lesbian books including Patricia Nell Warren's best selling novel The Front Runner. A significant part of A Different Light bookstore's first inventory was from Avon Book's backlist.

The Silverlake bookstore was located in the Sunset Junction area of Los Angeles where the Santa Monica and Sunset Boulevard met at Sanborn Avenue. Laurila and Leigh had to choose between either West Hollywood or Silverlake, both areas home to a large populations of gays and lesbians. At that time West Hollywood was not incorporated as a separate city. The decision was made to open the store in Silverlake where many gay men had purchased homes, and in anticipation of the gentrification of the Silverlake area as had happened in The Castro district of San Francisco.

The building rented for the bookstore was originally intended to house and repair Red Car system trolleys. The space had been minimally upgraded to allow for renting to retail businesses. With an unusual slanting front facade, high ceilings and mock-Tudor appearance, the store appeared to have occupied its space for decades. At the end of the first year, A Different Light expanded it to the next storefront by opening up wall in between the two locations, more than doubling the floor space. The store fixtures were built by a master carpenter who was a friend of Laurila's. With high ceilings and ample display space above the shelving, the bookstore worked with local artists and photographers to display artwork on a rotating basis.

Gay and lesbian authors made A Different Light bookstore part of their book signing tours, including Quentin Crisp, Ned Rorem, Judy Grahn, Katherine V. Forrest, Armistead Maupin, Christopher Isherwood and his partner Don Bacardi, David Hockney Mark Thompson, Michael Nava, Joseph Hansen, Paul Monette, William Burroughs, Edmund White and hundreds of others. The first author to have a signing was local author John Rechy, best known for his gay novel City of Night. Rechy appeared several times at the store, and he was coincidentally the last author to do a book signing at the original store before it closed.

On February 18, 1984, bookstore employee Ann Bradley initiated the first reading of “The Lesbian Writers Series”. Later playwright and store employee James Carroll Pickett would launch “The Gay Writers Series” and hosted the monthly readings from 1987 to 1990. In New York, bookstore employee Emanuel Xavier helped introduce spoken word poetry to the LGBTQ+ community with his "Realness & Rhythms" monthly readings.

== Decline and closure ==
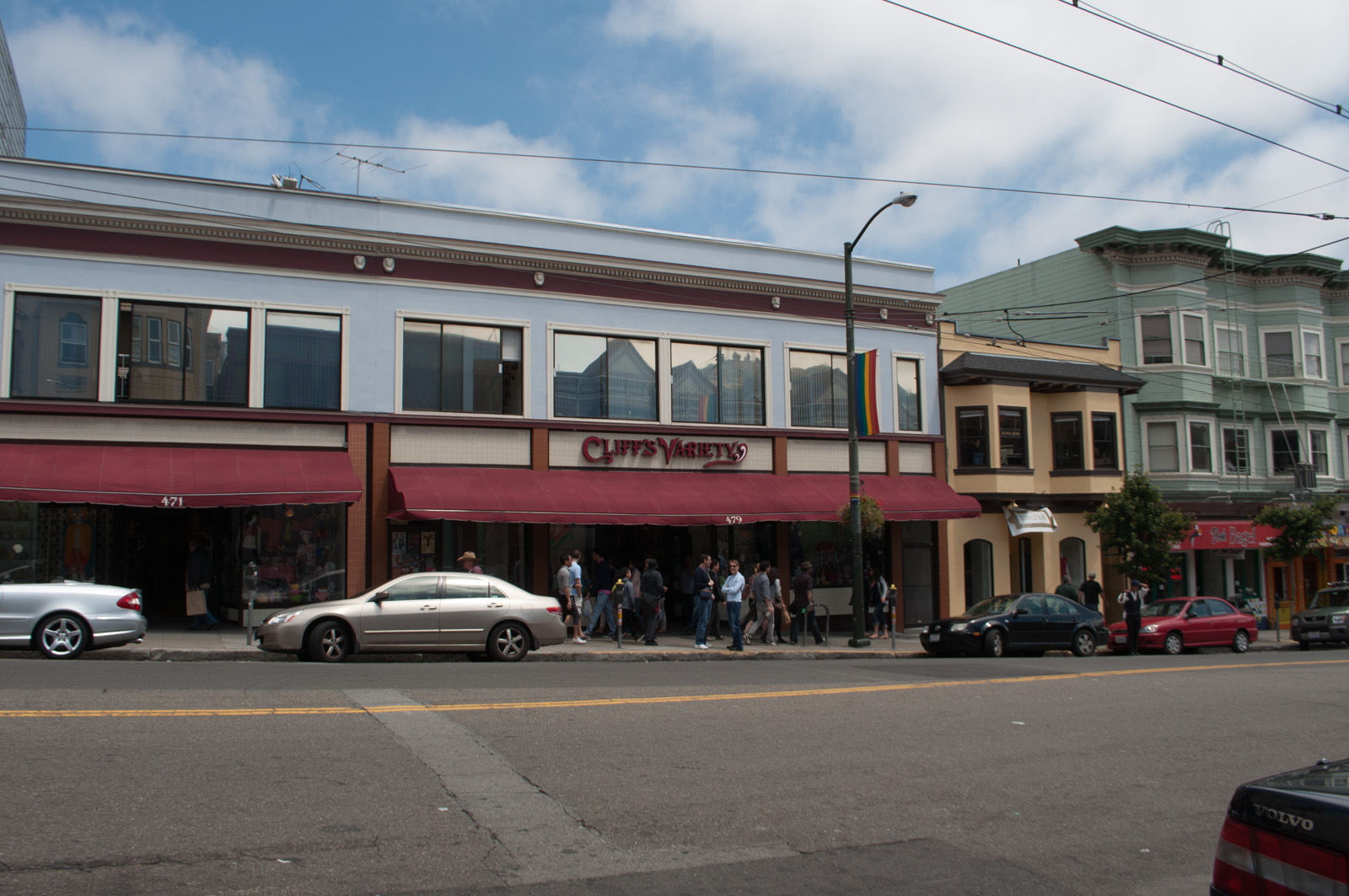
The former location in the Castro neighborhood of San Francisco

Leigh unexpectedly died in 1998 in West Hollywood while on vacation. The original Mission Statement from 1979 had a primary goal of making LGBT literature as widely available as possible. ADL was instrumental in making that happen. By the mid-90s most serious independent bookstores had LGBT sections with Barnes & Noble stores throughout the country entering the market and offering substantial discounts. Amazon was next. They too heavily discounted LGBT books. The three ADL stores were in high rent cities and could not afford to match their prices. Laurila sold the three stores in 2000 to Bill Barker and Stanley Newman, who closed the New York City store in 2001, citing Manhattan's high rent and retained the two stores in California.

Following several years of increased financial difficulty amid extreme competition with online book sellers, Barker and Newman closed the West Hollywood store in 2009, and the Castro branch in 2011. The chain's closure was part of a spate of LGBT bookstore closings in the United States early in the 21st century, including New York's Oscar Wilde Bookshop and Washington, D.C.'s Lambda Rising.

Laurila now works for New York City's Museum of Modern Art as its book manager. Labonté continued to work as an editor of LGBT literary anthologies for Cleis Press and Arsenal Pulp Press before his death in 2022.
