= NAC TV =

Community television station

CH5248
- Neepawa, Manitoba
- Channels: Analog: 30 (UHF) Cable: 12 (VHF); Digital: 1030 (MTS) 592 (Westman Communications)

Ownership
- Owner: Neepawa Access Community Television (NACTV) Inc.

History
- Founded: 1978 (cable); 1983 (over-the-air); 2012 (regional)
- Call sign meaning: Sequentially assigned by the CRTC

Technical information
- ERP: 100 W

Links
- Website: NAC TV Official Website

NAC TV (Neepawa Access Community Television) is a community channel based in Neepawa, Manitoba. It is available on local cable provider Westman Cable channel 117, broadcasts over the air on MTS channel 30/1030 and also on Bell ExpressVu channel 592.

== History ==
NAC TV became available across Manitoba on MTS TV in October 2012. NAC is on Channel 30 on the MTS lineup. NAC TV is also carried by Bell Satellite TV, channel 592, since late 2012.

In addition to airing local town council meetings, the station also airs live bingo, local news and public affairs shows, curling (currently absent from being shown) and hockey matches, plus ethnic, religious, children's cartoons, and special interest programs, totaling 55 hours per week of local programming. Scheduled programming runs from 10a.m. to 10p.m. each day. In 2022, it was decided to run 24 hour scheduled programming and programming is repeated overnight.

== See also ==
- Community channel (Canada)
- Public access
