= Richard Labonté =

Canadian writer and editor (1949–2022)

Richard Labonté (1949 – March 20, 2022) was a Canadian writer and editor, best known as the editor or co-editor of numerous anthologies of LGBT literature.

Originally from Edmonton, Alberta, Labonté studied English and political science at Carleton University in Ottawa, where he was an editor for The Charlatan. Following school he joined the Ottawa Citizen in 1972 as an editor, later writing film and book reviews, and was a contributor to The Body Politic. In 1980, he contributed to an Ottawa Citizen series on gay life in Ottawa, becoming one of the first Canadian journalists ever to come out in the pages of a mainstream newspaper.

During his time contributing to the Citizen, Labonté began a relationship with Norman Laurila, then worked at Glad Day Bookshop in Toronto. The couple subsequently moved to Los Angeles, where they would become co-founders of the influential LGBT bookstore A Different Light. Although their relationship broke up in 1983, they both remained involved in the store, with Labonté managing the Silver Lake store and Laurila managing a new branch in New York City.

After Michael Thomas Ford stepped down as editor of Cleis Press's annual Best Gay Erotica series in 1996, Labonté was invited to become editor of the series, because the deadline for the next anthology was imminent and his job as a bookstore manager meant he would have extensive contacts in the gay literary world whose work he could call in quickly. He remained the editor of the series for many years, and also edited numerous other themed anthologies for the company. He also published several anthologies with the Canadian Arsenal Pulp Press, and wrote book reviews for Books to Watch Out For/Gay Men's Edition, Book Marks, PlanetOut, Q Syndicate and Publishers Weekly.

Labonté won three Lambda Literary Awards for his work as an editor, for Best Gay Erotica 2005, First Person Queer (coedited with Lawrence Schimel) in 2008 and Best Gay Erotica 2009; his other titles included The Future Is Queer, Second Person Queer and I Like It Like That: True Tales of Gay Desire.

In 2008, Labonté received the Michele Karlsberg Leadership Award from the Publishing Triangle.

Labonté and his husband, Asa Dean Liles, moved back to Canada in 2001 and were living on Bowen Island in British Columbia at the time of his death.
