= Gay News and Views =

Canadian television series

- Presented by: Gordon Montador
- Country of origin: Canada

Production
- Production locations: Toronto, Ontario
- Running time: 30 minutes
- Production companies: Gay TV Collective; Maclean-Hunter

Original release
- Network: Maclean-Hunter; Rogers Cable; Metro Cable
- Release: September 19, 1977 – May 26, 1978

Gay News and Views is a Canadian television series, which aired on cable community channels in the Toronto area in 1977 and 1978. Produced by the Gay TV Collective at the facilities of Maclean-Hunter, the series was a news and information program targeted at LGBT audiences. Although produced by Maclean-Hunter, the series also aired on the Rogers Cable and Metro Cable systems.

The program premiered on September 19, 1977. It consisted of a news segment produced in conjunction with the staff of The Body Politic, interviews and discussion segments, entertainment by gay musicians and comedians, and a community events calendar.

Known members of the programming collective included host Gordon Montador and producer Frank Hutchings.

== Controversies ==
The program's first episode aired at 6 p.m., although in subsequent weeks it was rescheduled to air at 10 p.m. due to viewer complaints. Two days after the first episode, Rogers backed out of airing the show on the grounds of the complaints. Rogers claimed that they already had their own separate LGBT-oriented show in development, and that they were concerned about the CRTC making an issue of the service airing a program produced by another cable company.

Due to pressure from the LGBT community, including support from the collective producing a similar show in Ottawa, the company reinstated the program three weeks later. It was eventually revealed that there were fewer than 20 actual complaints about the first episode.

The show was also subject to efforts by Maclean-Hunter to impose a special code of conduct, a practice it did not follow with any other show being produced for the company. The code would have banned "propagandizing" or "recruiting" for gay organizations, would have restricted the show to content that was "educational and informative", and would have required in the name of "balance" that at least one person "not identified with the gay community" had to appear on each episode. The code was not adopted, although Maclean-Hunter retained the right to pre-screen content that might involve "controversial or unusual material".

== Cancellation ==
The program was cancelled by Maclean-Hunter on May 26, 1978. In his statement announcing the cancellation, Maclean-Hunter executive John Haynes described the program as "offensive", as "intellectually hostile", and as "disrespectful to the establishment heterosexual community". He falsely claimed that the program had shown a photo of two men kissing in the nude, when in fact the men in the photo were fully clothed and attending a Gay Alliance Toward Equality dance. A spokesman for Metro Cable issued a statement indicating that company had no issues with the program's content.

Following its cancellation, a radio program of the same title debuted on CKMS-FM in Waterloo as Canada's first known LGBT-oriented radio program.
