= Coming Out (TV series) =

Canadian television series

Coming Out is a Canadian television series, which aired on Maclean-Hunter's cable community channel in Toronto in 1972. It was the first Canadian television program targeted specifically to a lesbian, gay, bisexual and transgender community audience.

The program, a thirteen-episode documentary and interview series, profiled LGBT people living in Toronto in the earliest years of the gay rights movement. It was hosted by Paul Pearce and Sandra Dick of the Community Homophile Association of Toronto, and premiered on September 11, 1972.
