= MAtv =

Community television channels in Quebec, Canada

- Country: Canada
- Broadcast area: Provincial
- Headquarters: Montreal, Quebec

Ownership
- Owner: Vidéotron (Quebecor Media)

History
- Launched: 1970s
- Former names: Télé communautaire (1970s-1996); TCV Vidéotron (1996-1999); Canal Vox (1999-2007); Vox (2007-2012)

Links
- Website: matv.ca

MAtv (formerly Vox) is a Canadian community channels operated by the cable provider Vidéotron within the province of Quebec.

== History ==
In the 1970s, the first community radio stations started to appear in Quebec. These were non-commercial radio stations operated by social groups, in which the population can participate and whose operation is based on a cooperative basis. These types of stations broadcast programs that dealt with social issues that were typically neglected by other radio stations.

The 1970s also saw the emergence of cable television, which allowed the broadcasting of more television programs in certain regions.

Community television operates on the same principle as community radio and is hosted by the cable distribution companies, which are governed by a regulation of the Canadian Radio-television and Telecommunications Commission (CRTC).

The CRTC wanted the cable companies to reinvest in the sharing of the airwaves by offering a service to subscribers via a community channel. In Quebec, in 1973, the provincial government, through the Ministry of Culture and Communications, promoted the establishment of community television stations by financially supporting their basic operation. For example, citizen groups chose to develop such a community media because they believed in freedom of expression, public speaking and the opportunity to participate in social change. Autonomous Community Television Corporations (ACT) are therefore born of the will of these communities of citizens to equip themselves with a television communication tool. Some considered this means of communication as a place of creation, others chose to make it a place of debate and local public expression.

In 1978, in the Greater Montreal area, Cablevision Nationale (formerly National Cablevision) and CF Cable TV (today CFCF-DT, identified on-air by CTV Montreal) the East and West territories of the Island of Montreal, while Télécâble Vidéotron serves the South Shore and the North Shore of the city. Each cable operator manages its own community channel and broadcasts programs produced by ACT in its schedule. Cablevision Nationale's community television has a large recording studio, located at 90 Beaubien Street West, in Montreal. She also has a reporter's post that covers various events. Several programs are recorded, both by volunteers and professionals. In addition to the more traditional community programs, others such as a series that gives voice to the gay community, another that follows amateur hockey games and even a striptease show at midnight in the evening, is off the beaten path and interest people to subscribe to the cable. For its part Télécable Vidéotron owns several small community studios in several municipalities (Longueuil, Beloeil, Saint-Bruno-de-Montarville, Saint-Hubert, Saint-Jean-sur-Richelieu, Mont-Saint-Hilaire, Saint-Jérôme, Laval, Joliette and north of Montreal).

In 1980, Télécâble Vidéotron acquired Cablevision Nationale. With this acquisition, the four small studios serving different areas of Montreal and Laval, (90 Beaubien Street West, one on Beaubien Street East, one on Louvain Street and one on Saint-Elzéar Boulevard in Laval) will replace unique Montreal studio. Each of the studios will be managed by a community animator who will produce the programs while supervising the groups of volunteers who come to propose their projects. All of these programs produced by these small studios, as well as some produced by other community TVs served by Télécâble Vidéotron, are now broadcast on Cable 9.

In 1985, Télé communautaire was modernized and a large studio was established at 3555 Berri Street in Montreal. Located just above the Sherbrooke metro station, this studio offers better accessibility to the community. The team is growing and now consists of six versatile director-coordinators, who also work alternately as assistant directors, cameramen, lighting technicians, depending on the programs recorded.

Cable 9 broadcasts not only programs produced in the Montreal studio, but also other local programs from ACT in Greater Montreal, the South Shore or other regions of Quebec.

In 1987, Vidéotron moved its head office to 300 Viger Avenue (right next to the Champ-de-Mars metro station and Télé communautaire also installs, prominently, on the ground floor. Télé communautaire then has a very large studio, modern equipment and a larger production team. In November 1996, there are 21 employees: directors, cameramen, a secretary, a receptionist and a video library.

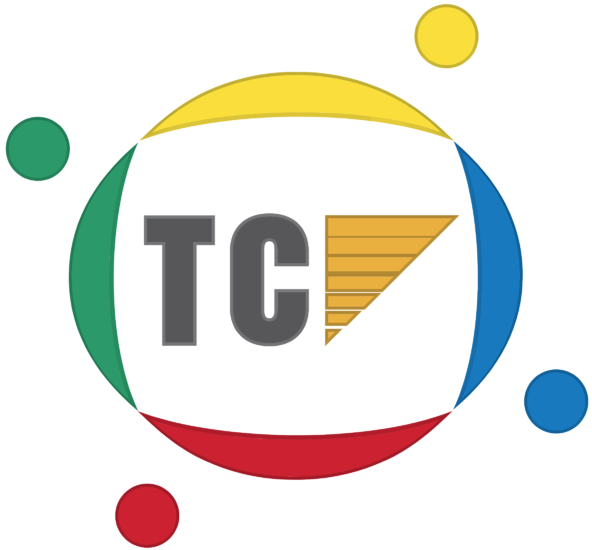
Logo of TCV Vidéotron used from 1996 until 1999

In 1996, Télé communautaire was renamed TCV. TCV Vidéotron's network in Greater Montreal covers the entire island of Montreal, its North Shore (including Saint-Jérôme, Joliette, Sainte-Thérèse, Repentigny), its South Shore (including Boucherville, Beloeil, Longueuil, Saint- Jean-sur-Richelieu and Châteauguay), Laval and the Vaudreuil region.

Logo of Canal Vox used from 1999 until 2004 (the Quebecor Media name was added in 2001 after the sale of Vidéotron at Quebecor)

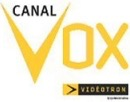
Logo of Canal Vox used from 2004 until 2007

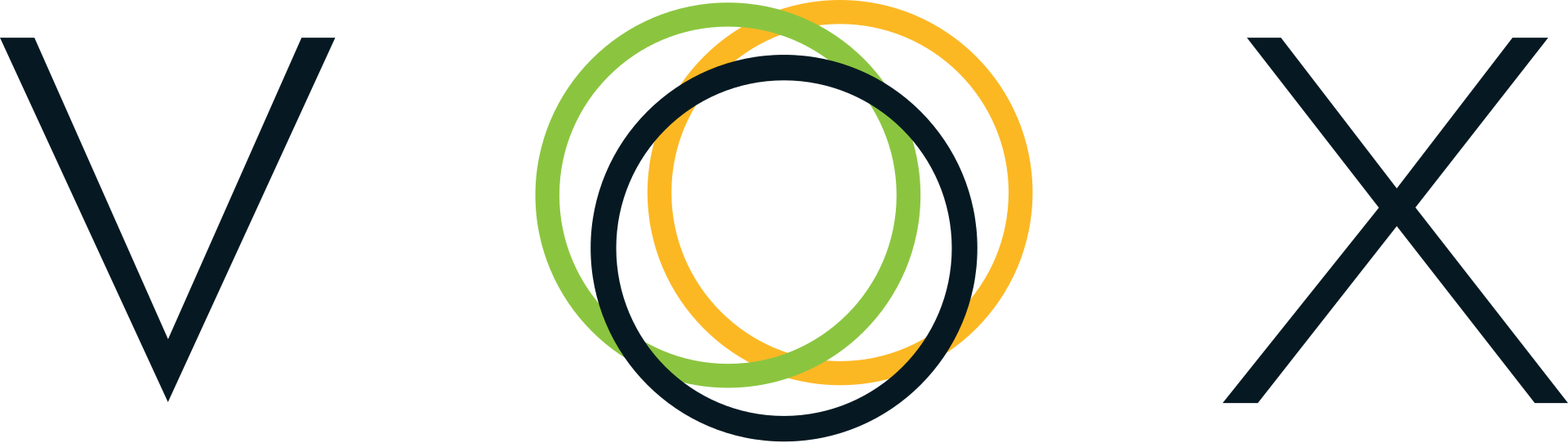
Logo of Vox used from 2007 until 2012

In 1999, Télé communautaire was renamed Canal Vox, then renamed Vox in 2007. Ten of its flagship programs, including The Confident and ICI et là , saw their audience triple.

On November 19, 2012, Vox was renamed MAtv with a planned focus on more viewer-produced programming.

=== Addition of English programming, ICTV complaint ===
On September 5, 2013, Vidéotron announced that they filed an application to the CRTC for permission to launch an English-language version of the channel, MYtv, to focus on Greater Montreal's anglophone communities. Vidéotron intended on only having one MYtv channel, but was open to carrying it on the lineups of service areas with a sizable anglophone population.

In 2014, the group Independent Community TV (ICTV) filed a complaint with the CRTC, alleging that Vidéotron was failing in its responsibility to provide public access and community programming, and demanded that the provider be ordered to relinquish control of the service to ICTV so that it could operate a replacement. ICTV cited the heavy involvement of Vidéotron staff in its programming, as well as the networking of programming across all MATV channels (thus failing the requirement for programming to reflect the local community).

In February 2015, the CRTC issued a decision on the matter; it agreed with ICTV's position on MAtv's regulatory non-compliance, but declined to transfer the license to ICTV. According to the commission, MAtv's schedule comprised just 30 per cent public access programming compared to its license requirement of 45 per cent, and instead was counting shows hosted and produced by professional broadcasters as public access. In addition, the majority of the channel's schedule comprised general interest programming shared by all of Vidéotron's community channels across Quebec, rather than being specifically oriented toward Montreal. The CRTC authorized the creation of the English-language channel, while setting out a number of new regulatory compliance conditions for MAtv.

Rather than establishing a second channel, Vidéotron instead began to carry some English-language programming on MATV in Montreal in September 2015, beginning with the premiere of five new series. The channel has committed to having 20% of its programming be English-language productions, corresponding roughly with the size of Montreal's anglophone population.

In August 2023, Vidéotron announced that MAtv in Montreal would be shut down in 2024, in order to prioritize investments into the local news operations of CFTM.

== Markets ==
- Montreal-Laval-Longueuil
- Quebec City-Lévis
- Saguenay
- Sherbrooke
- Cap-de-la-Madeleine
- Sorel-Tracy
- Granby
- Rivière-du-Loup
- Gatineau-Outaouais
