= Community television in Canada =

Form of media in Canada

Community television in Canada is a form of media that carries programming of local community interest produced by a cable television company and by independent community groups and distributed by a local cable company.

A community channel is a form of community television, much like public-access television cable TV in the United States and other forms of citizen-produced content. The provision of a community channel is required by CRTC regulations governing the licensing of cable companies. Cable companies are required to allocate a small percentage of cable subscription revenues for the provision of a community channel. As of 2009, this amounted to over $116 million annually in Canada. The community channel is viewed as a public trust that the cable companies manage on behalf of the Canadian public.

In 2016, the CRTC enacted rules allowing television providers in metropolitan markets (population of 1 million or higher) to allocate the required investment to the local news departments of a co-owned terrestrial television station instead, in lieu of operating a community channel. In the wake of the changes, Rogers Cable and Shaw Cable began to wind down their community channels in larger regions to take advantage of this policy. Community television services remain mandatory among television providers in smaller markets (or if not co-owned by a local owner of broadcast stations).

== History ==
In Canada, citizen media has roots going back to 1922 when filmmaker Robert Flaherty brought in an Inuk hunter to participate in Nanook of the North. In the 1960s this film was cited as an inspiration by a group of filmmakers associated with the National Film Board of Canada, whose Challenge for Change project was part of Canada's war on poverty. In 1967 Challenge for Change contributed to a prototype studio where people were free to help shape community media. More public access experiments followed. The Canadian Radio-television and Telecommunications Commission required cable companies to provide public access on July 16, 1971.

In 1997, the CRTC deregulated community television in Canada, causing a protracted period of political tension between cable companies and community groups. After complaints to the CRTC from the Canadian public, a policy review process was initiated, culminating in CRTC Decision 2002-61, a reinvigoration of the participatory elements of the community channel. Under 2002-61, community channels can be run by independent community groups, and up to one-half of the channel must be made available for independent community producers.

In June 2016, as part of the recommendations put forth by the CRTC's "Let's Talk TV" review, the commission enacted a policy allowing television providers in metropolitan markets (population of one million or higher) to reallocate their mandatory community television expenditures towards the news departments of co-owned broadcast stations in the same market. Subsequently, Shaw Communications announced in April 2017 that it would wind down its Shaw TV community channels in Calgary, Edmonton, and Vancouver on August 15, 2017, and shift their funding allotments to the Global stations (owned by sister company Corus Entertainment) in each market. Rogers Cable similarly announced that it would cut back on its Rogers TV services in the Greater Toronto Area, shutting down four channels (including Brampton, Richmond Hill, Mississauga, and Toronto) and cutting staff at others. After the acquisition of Shaw by Rogers in 2023, Shaw's allocation was pulled from Corus and Global and moved to Rogers' Citytv stations.

== Branding ==
Large companies may brand all of their community channels similarly — for example, all community channels operated by Rogers Cable are branded as Rogers TV, and Cogeco Cable's channels are branded as YourTV. Such systems may also share some of their more general interest programming. For example, the Toronto-produced movie review series Reel to Real aired on all Rogers Television channels throughout Ontario. Prior to the Telecable system in Saskatoon being taken over by Shaw Communications, its designated community-access channel was branded Telecable 10.

In markets served by more than one cable company, the cable companies may also produce a single community channel through shared ownership — Cable 14 in Hamilton is a notable example of this.

More rarely, a cable company may offer more than one community channel. For instance, in Ottawa and some communities in New Brunswick, distinct channels serve the anglophone and francophone communities, while in Vancouver, Shaw Cable produces a multicultural programming channel in addition to the primary community channel.

== Programming ==
Community channels commonly broadcast a mix of public access television and community service programming such as city council meetings, sports broadcasts or local talk shows. Under CRTC policy 2002-61, up to one half of the air time of the community channel must be made available to independent community producers. Some community channels produce and show full programs, while others predominantly adopt the format of a local news channel with a constant rotation of news, public affairs and human interest reports. When not broadcasting live programming, a community channel typically displays a bulletin board of community event listings.

Cable companies sometimes collaborate with volunteer committees and community groups to produce programming of community interest. Through their community programming initiatives, community channels have often been leaders in media diversity in Canada — for example, community channel programs such as Coming Out, Gay News and Views and 10% QTV were the first Canadian television programs targeted to LGBT audiences in Canada.

Community channels also frequently broadcast local minor or junior league sporting events, such as OHL, QMJHL or WHL hockey games. In provinces which do not operate a dedicated legislature broadcaster channel, community channels may also air some proceedings of the provincial Legislative Assembly.

While Canadian community channels are expected to make efforts to solicit program proposals from the public, nowadays despite the many requests for airtime it is relatively uncommon (compared to American public-access television cable TV channels) for a proposal from an individual member of the public to make air. Community groups and cable companies disagree as to the best way to manage the public-access television channel assets. Many cable companies develop system-wide formats which fill up much of a local channel's schedule – for instance, several Rogers Television channels air programs entitled Daytime, First Local, or (City/Region) Living. Community groups want access to airtime for their independently produced programs.

In February 2015, the CRTC reprimanded Vidéotron — a major cable provider serving Quebec — for not producing enough programming of local interest for its Montreal community channel MAtv. It cited arguments by non-profit group ICTV, including networking of programming between MAtv outlets across the provider's footprint, and insufficient community involvement in the production of its programming (including a number of programs produced by an in-house team of professional staff, and rejecting a number of programs by citing insufficient production capacity — a claim the CRTC felt was unsubstantiated). The CRTC ordered MAtv to establish a community advisory board.

Bell Fibe's TV1 has also invested in some scripted comedy and drama programming by independent local producers, including the series Pink Is In, Vollies and Sunshine City. Hamilton's Cable 14 is a partner in the city's annual Hamilton Film Festival, airing the festival's short film programs as a series of special television broadcasts.

A notable community channel success story is Tom Green, whose guerilla gross-out comedy first appeared on Rogers Television in Ottawa. Some other personalities who have been associated with community channel programming include Catherine Clark, Jacqueline Hennessy and Dale Goldhawk.

== Terrestrial television ==
The term community channel may also refer to a conventional broadcast station — such as, CFTV-DT in Leamington, Ontario, CFSO-TV in Cardston, Alberta, CHCO-TV in St. Andrews, New Brunswick, and CIMC-TV in Arichat, Nova Scotia — owned and operated by a local non-profit organization to serve a similar function. Terrestrial community stations are offered only where a local group has presented a viable business plan to the CRTC and been awarded a license — unlike cable community channels, it is not mandatory that a terrestrial community channel be made available in any given market. Cable companies may also apply to the CRTC for relief of carriage responsibilities on the basic cable tier, such as in the case of CFTV, which is carried on digital basic cable.

One of the most famous attempts to launch a terrestrial community station in Canada, Star Ray TV, became notable when its owner began operating it as a pirate television station after failing to secure a CRTC license.

On occasion, a cable community channel may itself be awarded a license to broadcast terrestrially in addition to its cable television carriage. Examples include NAC TV in Neepawa, Manitoba and Télé-Mag in Quebec City. This occurs most frequently in smaller communities that have no commercial media service of their own.

== Notable community channel systems ==
- AccessNow TV (Access Communications)
- EastLink Television
- MAtv (Vidéotron)
- PersonaTV
- Rogers TV/TV Rogers
- TVNB (defunct)
- YourTV (Cogeco)
