= Ontario Hockey League =

Junior ice hockey league in Ontario and United States

- Current season, competition or edition: 2026–27 OHL season
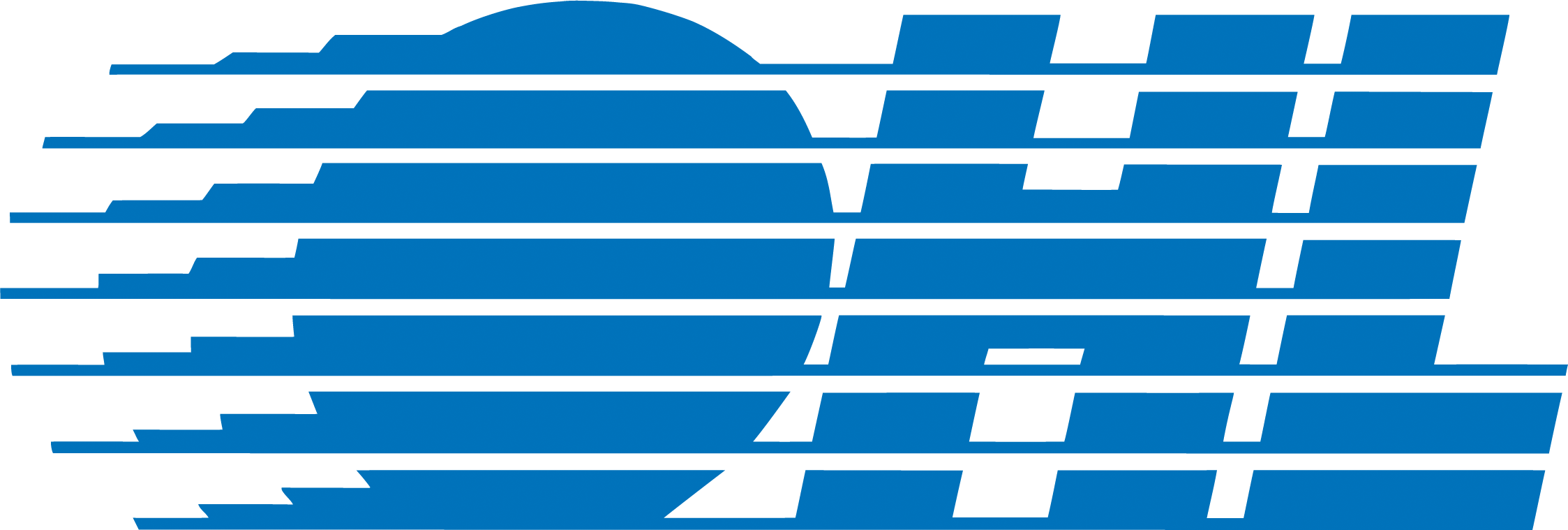
- Sport: Ice hockey
- Founded: 1980
- Commissioner: Bryan Crawford
- No. of teams: 20
- Countries: Canada (17 teams); US (3 teams)
- Most recent champion: Kitchener Rangers (5)
- Most titles: Oshawa Generals (13)
- Broadcasters: FloSports, TSN, YourTV, Rogers TV, TV Rogers
- Website: ontariohockeyleague.com

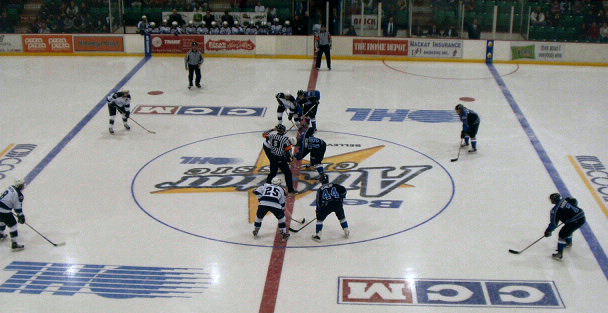
OHL All-Star Game opening face off at Belleville's Yardmen Arena on February 1, 2006

The Ontario Hockey League (OHL; French: Ligue de hockey de l'Ontario (LHO)) is one of the three major junior ice hockey leagues which constitute the Canadian Hockey League, alongside the Western Hockey League and the Quebec Maritimes Junior Hockey League. The league is for players aged 16–20. There are currently 20 teams in the OHL: seventeen in Ontario, two in Michigan, and one in Pennsylvania.

The league was founded in 1980 when its predecessor, the Ontario Major Junior Hockey League, formally split away from the Ontario Hockey Association, joining the Canadian Major Junior Hockey League and its direct affiliation with Hockey Canada. The OHL traces its history of Junior A hockey back to 1933 with the partition of Junior A and B. In 1970, the OHA Junior A League was one of five Junior A leagues operating in Ontario. The OHA was promoted to Tier I Junior A for the 1970–71 season and took up the name Ontario Major Junior Hockey League. Since 1980 the league has grown rapidly into a high-profile marketable product, with many games broadcast on television and radio.

== History ==
Leagues for ice hockey in Ontario were first organized in 1890 by the newly created Ontario Hockey Association (OHA). In 1892 the OHA recognized junior hockey—referring to skill rather than age. In 1896 the OHA moved to the modern age-limited junior hockey concept, distinct from senior and intermediate divisions. Since then the evolution to the Ontario Hockey League has developed through four distinct eras of junior-aged non-professional hockey in Ontario. In 1933, the junior division was divided into two levels, Junior A and Junior B. In 1970 the Junior A level was divided into two levels, Tier I (or Major Junior A) and Tier II (or Minor Junior A). In 1974 the Tier I/Major Junior A group separated from the OHA and became the independent Ontario Major Junior Hockey League (OMJHL). In 1980, the OMJHL became the Ontario Hockey League.

The OHL split from the OHA in July 1982. The OHA and OHL disagreed on financial terms of affiliation, then the OHL decided to handle its own administration. The OHA and the OHL later reached an interim affiliation agreement, which allowed the OHL to compete at the Memorial Cup.

In March 2005, the league announced the launch of OHL Live Stream, resulting in OHL games being broadcast live on a pay-per-view (PPV) broadband basis.

=== Commissioners ===
OMJHL and OHL commissioners (years in office)

- Tubby Schmalz (September 23, 1974 – December 15, 1978)
- Bill Beagan (December 15, 1978 – January 1979)
- Sherwood Bassin (interim; January–September 1979)
- David Branch (September 17, 1979 – August 6, 2024)
- Bryan Crawford (August 6, 2024 – present)

== Teams ==
- East Division
- Central Division Midwest Division
- West Division

Ontario Hockey League
Eastern Conference
Division	Team	City	Arena
East	Brantford Bulldogs	Brantford, Ontario	TD Civic Centre
East	Kingston Frontenacs	Kingston, Ontario	Slush Puppie Place
East	Oshawa Generals	Oshawa, Ontario	Tribute Communities Centre
East	Ottawa 67's	Ottawa, Ontario	TD Place Arena
East	Peterborough Petes	Peterborough, Ontario	Peterborough Memorial Centre
Central	Barrie Colts	Barrie, Ontario	Sadlon Arena
Central	Brampton Steelheads	Brampton, Ontario	CAA Centre
Central	Niagara IceDogs	St. Catharines, Ontario	Meridian Centre
Central	North Bay Battalion	North Bay, Ontario	Boart Longyear Memorial Gardens
Central	Sudbury Wolves	Greater Sudbury, Ontario	Sudbury Community Arena
Western Conference
Division	Team	City	Arena
Midwest	Erie Otters	Erie, Pennsylvania	Erie Insurance Arena
Midwest	Guelph Storm	Guelph, Ontario	Sleeman Centre
Midwest	Kitchener Rangers	Kitchener, Ontario	Kitchener Memorial Auditorium Complex
Midwest	London Knights	London, Ontario	Canada Life Place
Midwest	Owen Sound Attack	Owen Sound, Ontario	Harry Lumley Bayshore Community Centre
West	Flint Firebirds	Flint, Michigan	Dort Federal Credit Union Event Center
West	Saginaw Spirit	Saginaw, Michigan	Dow Event Center
West	Sarnia Sting	Sarnia, Ontario	Progressive Auto Sales Arena
West	Sault Ste. Marie Greyhounds	Sault Ste. Marie, Ontario	GFL Memorial Gardens
West	Windsor Spitfires	Windsor, Ontario	WFCU Centre

=== Former teams ===
- Cornwall Royals 1981–1992, moved to Newmarket
  - Newmarket Royals 1992–1994, moved to Sarnia
- Niagara Falls Flyers 1980–1982, moved to North Bay
  - North Bay Centennials 1982–2002, moved to Saginaw
- Brantford Alexanders 1980–1984, moved to Hamilton
  - Hamilton Steelhawks 1984–1988, moved to Niagara Falls
  - Niagara Falls Thunder 1988–1996, moved to Erie
- Guelph Platers 1982–1989, moved to Owen Sound
- Toronto Marlboros 1980–1989, moved to Hamilton
  - Dukes of Hamilton 1989–1991, moved to Guelph
- Detroit Junior Red Wings 1992–1995, became the Detroit Whalers
  - Detroit Whalers 1995–1997, moved to Plymouth
  - Plymouth Whalers 1997–2015, moved to Flint
- Brampton Battalion 1998–2013, moved to North Bay
- Mississauga IceDogs 1998–2007, moved to St. Catharines
- Toronto St. Michael's Majors 1996–2007
  - Mississauga St. Michael's Majors 2007–2012, became the Mississauga Steelheads
  - Mississauga Steelheads 2012–2024, moved to Brampton
- Belleville Bulls 1981–2015, moved to Hamilton
  - Hamilton Bulldogs 2015–2023, moved to Brantford

=== Timeline of franchises (since 1980) ===
Note: The 12 original OHL franchises were all previously members of the OMJHL. Some other franchises played in different junior leagues prior to joining the OHL.

Current teams are listed in blue. Gold stars denote J. Ross Robertson Cup (League championship) winners

== Schedule ==
The 20 OHL clubs play a 68-game unbalanced schedule, which starts in the third full week of September, running until the third week of March. Ninety percent (90%) of OHL games are scheduled between Thursday and Sunday to minimize the number of school days missed for its players.

=== OHL playoffs and Memorial Cup ===
The J. Ross Robertson Cup is awarded annually to the winner of the Championship Series. The Cup is named for John Ross Robertson, who was president of the Ontario Hockey Association from 1901 to 1905.

The OHL playoffs consist of the top 16 teams in the league, 8 from each conference. The teams play a best-of-seven game series, and the winner of each series advances to the next round. The final two teams eventually compete for the J. Ross Robertson Cup.

The OHL champion then competes with the winners of the Western Hockey League, the Quebec Maritimes Junior Hockey League, and the host of the tournament to play for the Memorial Cup, which is awarded to the junior hockey champions of Canada. The host team of the tournament is alternated between the three leagues every season. The most recent OHL team to win the Memorial Cup was the Kitchener Rangers in 2026.

== Memorial Cup champions ==
The Memorial Cup has been captured 20 times by OHL/OHA teams since the tournament went to a three-league format in 1972:

- 2026: Kitchener Rangers
- 2025: London Knights
- 2024: Saginaw Spirit
- 2017: Windsor Spitfires
- 2016: London Knights
- 2015: Oshawa Generals
- 2010: Windsor Spitfires
- 2009: Windsor Spitfires
- 2005: London Knights
- 2003: Kitchener Rangers
- 1999: Ottawa 67's
- 1993: Sault Ste. Marie Greyhounds
- 1990: Oshawa Generals
- 1986: Guelph Platers
- 1984: Ottawa 67's
- 1982: Kitchener Rangers
- 1979: Peterborough Petes
- 1976: Hamilton Fincups
- 1975: Toronto Marlboros
- 1973: Toronto Marlboros

The Cup was also won 16 times by OHA teams in the period between 1945 and 1971:

- 1970: Montreal Junior Canadiens
- 1969: Montreal Junior Canadiens
- 1968: Niagara Falls Flyers
- 1967: Toronto Marlboros
- 1965: Niagara Falls Flyers
- 1964: Toronto Marlboros
- 1962: Hamilton Red Wings
- 1961: Toronto St. Michael's Majors
- 1960: St. Catharines Teepees
- 1956: Toronto Marlboros
- 1955: Toronto Marlboros
- 1954: St. Catharines Teepees
- 1953: Barrie Flyers
- 1952: Guelph Biltmores
- 1951: Barrie Flyers
- 1947: Toronto St. Michael's Majors

== Priority selection ==
The OHL's predecessor, the OHA, had a midget and juvenile draft dating back to the 50s, until voted out in 1962. In 1966 it was resumed, though not publicized. Starting in the 1970s the draft went through several changes. Originally the draft was for 17-year-old midgets not already associated with teams through their sponsored youth programs. In 1971 the league first allowed "underage" midgets to be picked in the first three rounds. In 1972 disagreements about the Toronto team's rights to its "Marlie" players (and Greg Neeld) and claims to American player Mark Howe led to a revised system. In 1973 each team was permitted to protect eight midget area players (Toronto was allowed to protect 10 players from its midget sponsored teams). In 1975 the league phased out the area protections, and the 1976 OHA midget draft was the first in which all midget players were eligible. In 1999 the league changed the draft to a bantam age (15 and 16 year old). It is a selection of players who are residents of the province of Ontario, the states of Michigan, Pennsylvania and New York, and other designated U.S. states east of the Mississippi River plus Missouri.

Prior to 2001, the OHL held the Priority Selection in a public forum, such as an arena. Drafts were attended by many players and family members. In 2001, the OHL decided to hold the "draft" via the internet, greatly reducing the costs the league and its member teams incurred in hosting a public draft. This move reduced the stress and pressure that prospective players faced with a large crowd present. In November 2025, the OHL announced that the 2026 Priority Selection would return to an in-person format for the first time since 2000.

The Jack Ferguson Award is presented annually to the first overall selection. The award was named in honour of long time OHL scout and former Director of Central Scouting Jack Ferguson.

== Trophies and awards ==
List of trophies and awards in the Ontario Hockey League.

Playoffs trophies
Trophy name	Recognition	Founded
J. Ross Robertson Cup	OHL playoffs champion	1934
Bobby Orr Trophy	Eastern Conference champion	1999
Wayne Gretzky Trophy	Western Conference champion	1999
Wayne Gretzky 99 Award	Playoffs MVP	1999
Regular season — Team trophies
Trophy name	Recognition	Founded
Hamilton Spectator Trophy	Team with best record	1958
Leyden Trophy	East division champion	1976
Emms Trophy	Central division champion	1976
Bumbacco Trophy	West division champion	1995
Holody Trophy	Midwest division champion	1999
Regular season — Executive awards
Trophy name	Recognition	Founded
Matt Leyden Trophy	Coach of the year	1972
Jim Gregory Award	General manager of the year	2020
Bill Long Award	Lifetime achievement	1989
OHL Executive of the Year	Executive of the Year (not awarded since 2013)	1990
Regular season — Player awards
Trophy name	Recognition	Founded
Red Tilson Trophy	Most outstanding player	1945
Eddie Powers Memorial Trophy	Top scorer	1946
Dave Pinkney Trophy	Lowest team goals against	1949
Max Kaminsky Trophy	Most outstanding defenceman	1961
Jim Mahon Memorial Trophy	Top scoring right winger	1972
Emms Family Award	Rookie of the year	1973
William Hanley Trophy	Most sportsmanlike player	1975
F. W. "Dinty" Moore Trophy	Best rookie GAA	1976
Bobby Smith Trophy	Scholastic player of the year	1980
Leo Lalonde Memorial Trophy	Overage player of the year	1984
OHL Goaltender of the Year	Goaltender of the year	1988
Dan Snyder Memorial Trophy	Humanitarian of the year	1993
Roger Neilson Memorial Award	Top academic college/university player	2005
Ivan Tennant Memorial Award	Top academic high school player	2005
Mickey Renaud Captain's Trophy	Team captain that best exemplifies character and commitment	2009
Prospect player awards
Trophy name	Recognition	Founded
Jack Ferguson Award	First overall pick in priority selection	1981
Tim Adams Memorial Trophy	OHL Cup MVP	2003

== See also ==
- List of OHL seasons
- List of OHA Junior A standings
- CHL USA Prospects Challenge
