= YourTV (Canada) =

Cable community channels owned by Cogeco

- Formerly: TVCogeco (2005–2016); CogecoTV (2016–2017)
- Company type: Subsidiary
- Industry: Media
- Founded: Varies
- Headquarters: Burlington, Ontario; Trois-Rivières, Quebec
- Parent: Cogeco Connexion
- Website: YourTV.TV

YourTV (formerly TVCogeco and CogecoTV) is the brand of community channels owned by Cogeco. YourTV broadcasts into the Canadian provinces of Ontario and Quebec. Some channels broadcast in both the English and French languages, often on separate channels, in which case the French-language station is branded NousTV.

Programming the channels is produced with the assistance of volunteers. This programming was created in response to CRTC regulations which previously required that cable companies produce local content (this is no longer required but strongly encouraged).

== Programming ==
Former logo as TVCogeco

YourTV in Ontario provides comprehensive coverage of the Ontario Hockey League, broadcasting games in Peterborough, Sarnia, Windsor, North Bay, Kingston and Niagara. Most home and away games of those teams being available only on cable on the local station, while many other OHL games are available as part of a package in partnership with Rogers TV. Quebec systems air Quebec Major Junior Hockey League games, in partnership with Vidéotron.

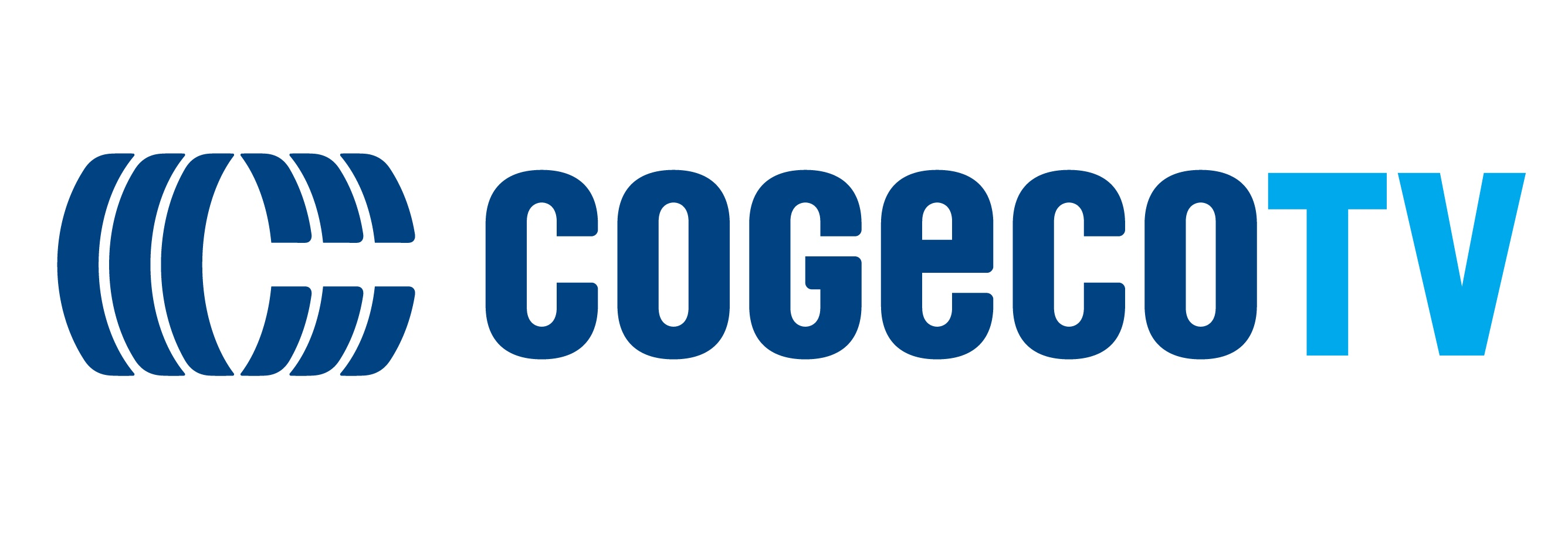
Former logo as CogecoTV

YourTV also provides community access and community oriented programming, and an electronic bulletin board service, featuring public service announcements regarding activities and events of local non-profit agencies.

== YourTV stations ==
All YourTV channels are available to Cogeco Cable subscribers. As well, programming is also available to Digital Cable subscribers through Cogeco's "Free On Demand".

=== Ontario ===
==== Central ====
- Belleville Cable 4/700 HD
- Cobourg Cable 10/700 HD
- Kingston Cable 13/700 HD
- Peterborough/Kawartha Lakes Cable 10/700 HD

==== Eastern ====
- Arnprior Cable 22/700 HD
- Brockville Cable 10/700 HD
- Cornwall Cable 11/700 HD
- Hawkesbury Cable 11 (former)
- Pembroke Cable 12/700 HD
- Renfrew Cable 22/700 HD
- Smiths Falls Cable 10/700 HD

==== Golden Horseshoe ====
- Burlington/Oakville Cable 23/700 HD
- Milton Cable 14/700 HD
- Fergus Cable 14/700 HD (Now discontinued, as of 2023)
- Niagara Falls Cable 10/700 HD /Grimsby Cable 14/700 HD /St. Catharines Cable 10/700 HD /Welland Cable 10/700 HD/Niagara-on-the-Lake Cable 10/700HD

(Although Cogeco provides cable service in parts of the Hamilton market, regional monopolies in the region are also held by Rogers Cable and Source Cable. The 3 companies jointly operate a single community channel for Hamilton known as Cable 14, so there is no YourTV channel proper in the region.)

==== Northern ====
Cogeco North Bay News

- Gravenhurst Cable 10 HD 700
- Huntsville Cable 10 HD 700
- North Bay Cable 12 HD 700
- Parry Sound Cable 11 HD 700

==== Southwest ====
- Chatham-Kent Cable 11 HD 700
- Sarnia Cable 6 HD 700
- Windsor Cable 11 HD 700

=== Quebec ===
(list does not include local channels not operated by Cogeco)

- Alma
- Baie-Comeau
- Drummondville
- Magog
- Matane
- Montmagny
- Rimouski
- Sept-Îles
- Shawinigan
- Saint-Georges
- Saint-Hyacinthe
- Sainte-Adèle
- Salaberry-de-Valleyfield
- Thetford Mines
- Trois-Rivières (Cogeco-served areas only)
