= C Channel =

Defunct Canadian pay-TV channel

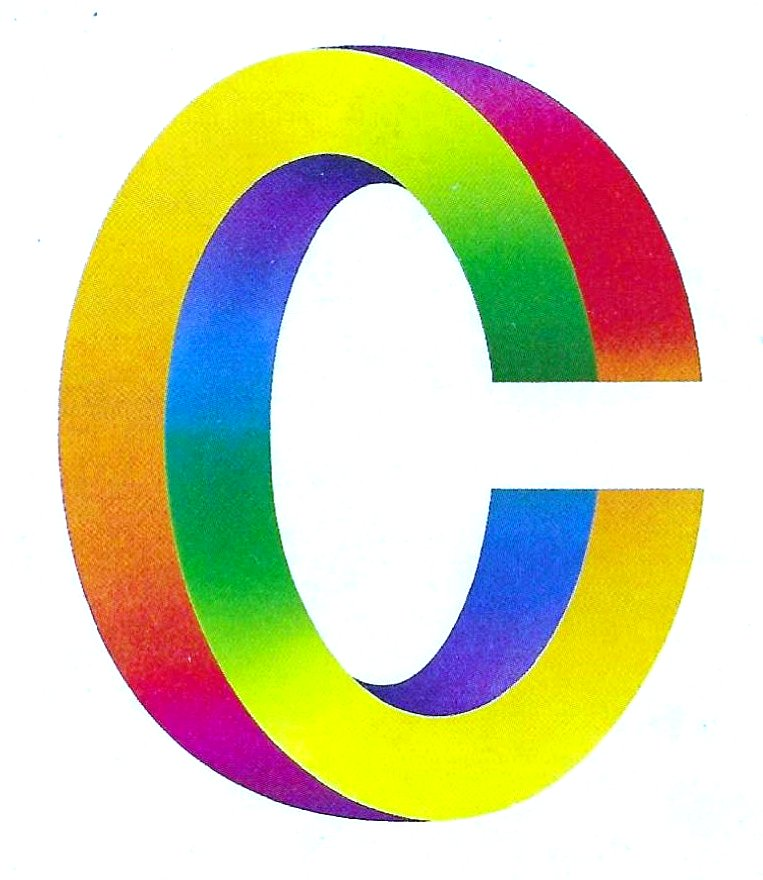
- Country: Canada
- Broadcast area: National
- Network: Independent
- Headquarters: Toronto, Ontario

Programming
- Picture format: 240i

Ownership
- Owner: Lively Arts Market Builders Inc.

History
- Launched: February 1, 1983
- Closed: June 30, 1983

C Channel was a short-lived Canadian premium television channel specializing in arts programming. It was one of Canada's first licensed "pay TV" channels when it began in 1983 but it ended in failure within five months.

== History ==
Toronto-based company Lively Arts Market Builders Inc. was one of several companies that received a license from the Canadian Radio-television and Telecommunications Commission (CRTC) to provide a subscription television service for Canadian cable companies. The company's offering, C Channel, would feature artistic content such as theatrical, opera, and ballet performances. This format was distinct from the other new pay-movie services, First Choice and Superchannel.

C Channel, First Choice, and Superchannel began their broadcasts on February 1, 1983. C Channel's President Edgar Cowan predicted 200,000 subscribers and financial equilibrium within a year.

== Programming ==
C Channel was required, as a condition of license from the CRTC, to spend no less than 20% of its revenues and 50% of its expenditures on Canadian-produced programming. The channel had planned to spend C$4 million in production during its initial seven months of broadcasting.

C Channel held a two-night preview of its programming on January 20–21, cablecast on most cable systems, such as Greater Winnipeg Cablevision, which was actually not able to carry the real service due to the dispute with the Manitoba Telephone System (MTS).

On the first night, there were only two programs, beginning at 8 p.m. (Eastern Standard Time): Swan Lake, performed by the Royal Ballet at the Royal Opera House in London, England. The other was a film originally released in 1980, The Last Metro.

One of the programs featured was a Bach-themed concert performed by flautist James Galway and violinist Kyung-wha Chung, while jazz enthusiasts could watch performances from the Montreal International Jazz Festival.

Stereo audio broadcasts using available cable FM channels were permitted by the CRTC on February 11, 1983. C Channel immediately activated its stereo audio feed when it received this approval.

One of its marquee presentations was the Royal Shakespeare Company's 8½ hour production of The Life and Adventures of Nicholas Nickleby acquired from Britain's Channel 4. The program ran on March 13, 1983, from 1 p.m. to midnight with breaks for lunch, tea, and dinner.

=== Hours ===
C Channel initially broadcast approximately 8 hours per day, beginning at 7 p.m. (Eastern) with the children's programming block and ended approximately 11 p.m. or midnight. The station planned to expand the schedule by May 1983 with an earlier daily on-air time with the broadcast day ending at approximately 3:30 a.m. C Channel president Ed Cowan had hoped to implement a 24-hour schedule later that year.

== Demise ==
The three Canadian premium channels, at a steep and expensive $16 per channel per subscriber (equivalent to $45 in 2025) at a time when a basic cable subscription was $10–12, appealed to only to a small percentage of the many existing Canadian cable TV subscribers.

C Channel's cultural offerings, similar to the type of programming occasionally seen on PBS and CBC Television, failed to attract the expected number of subscribers. In April 1983, station president Ed Cowan admitted that "we always knew we were under-financed", noting that C$5 million in financing was raised, when double that capital amount was deemed "safe". Also, during the round of private financing in December 1982, share prices were cut to $3 each from $10 in order to sell.

On June 17, 1983, the broadcaster was in a receivership with C$9 million in debt, equivalent to C$25.4 million in 2025, and gained only 27,000 subscribers where 60,000–100,000 were expected, well short of its break-even point of 175,000 subscribers. As a result, C Channel's broadcasts ceased on June 30, 1983.

== Aftermath ==
Following the receivership, the production facility and other studio assets were sold to Crossroads Christian Communications which was planning to establish a national faith-based television service.

C Channel's demise was one part of a troubled start to Canada's subscription television industry. The remaining premium movie channels were forced to restructure into regional monopolies for survival; these monopolies still exist despite the current profitability of this sector.

About 10 years later, a second attempt at launching an arts-oriented cable network in Canada was made when the CRTC heard an application by CHUM Limited of Toronto for a Canadian version of the Bravo television network that had been in operation in the United States since December 1980. Bravo! signed on January 1, 1995, and was considerably more successful and continues to broadcast, though (in the vein of the "channel drift" encountered with many niche specialty channels) it has gradually shifted towards more popular fare at the expense of its fine-arts programming. Unlike C Channel, Bravo! does not charge an individual fee for service, but rather is included in various "bundles" or "tiers" offered by the country's cable and satellite service providers.
