= Eastlink Community TV =

- Country: Canada
- Broadcast area: Northern Ontario; New Brunswick; Newfoundland and Labrador; Nova Scotia; Prince Edward Island

Programming
- Picture format: 1080i (HDTV); 480i (SDTV)

Ownership
- Owner: Eastlink

Links
- Website: www.eastlink.ca/cable-digital-tv/community-tv

Availability

Eastlink Community TV is the brand for Eastlink's community channels that serve Nova Scotia, Prince Edward Island, Newfoundland, Ontario, Alberta and British Columbia. As of 2009, the company's systems in Western Canada are served by the distinct PersonaTV division.

The channels are known for providing weekly broadcasts of the Quebec Major Junior Hockey League.

== Original programs ==
Eastlink TV produces a variety of original programming. Some is specific to a particular region, and some is shown network-wide.

Show	Theme	Area covered
Backyard BBQ Battle	A BBQ themed show with two backyard friends competing.	
Friday Night Hockey	A show that broadcasts QMJHL games	
Sportsland	A weekly hour-long talk show devoted to the world of sports	
Eastlink Magazine	A weekly compilation of good news stories from around Nova Scotia	Nova Scotia
Welcome to my Kitchen	Cooking show	
Fishing with Friends	Fishing show	
the path of yoga	Yoga show	
Island View -	Local half hour interview, call-in show.	Prince Edward Island
Avalon East Senior Hockey League	Local coverage of the Harbour Grace CeeBee Stars.	Newfoundland and Labrador
Home Ice	a weekly magazine program about the Northern Ontario Junior Hockey League (NOJHL) Produced out of Timmins, Ontario	

== Production ==
Eastlink Community TV shows are produced by crews composed of both television professionals and community volunteers. Some programs, such as live sports events or Eastlink Magazine, will generally have more volunteers on crew than Eastlink Community TV employees. Providing training and opportunities for volunteers is both a duty under the terms of Eastlink's cable license, and an opportunity to produce a wider range of programming than would otherwise be possible.

== Eastlink Community TV stations ==
In Greater Sudbury, Saugeen Shores and Timmins, the community channels were previously branded as Eastlink TV News, a holdover from the branding used by these stations when they were operated by PersonaTV. Then in 2018, the branding of all community channels changed to Eastlink Community TV.

=== Nova Scotia ===
- Amherst - Channel 10
- Antigonish - Channel 10
- Avonport/Windsor - Channel 10
- Bedford/Sackville - Channel 10
- Berwick/Aylesford/Greenwood/Middleton - Channel 5
- Bridgewater/Lunenburg - Channel 10
- Digby - Channel 10
- Halifax/Dartmouth - Channel 10 SD/610 HD
- Liverpool - Channel 10
- Mount Uniacke - Channel 10
- Pictou County - Channel 10
- New Minas/Kentville/Coldbrook/Wolfville - Channel 10
- Oxford/Collingwood/River Philip - Channel 10
- Parrsboro - Channel 10
- Porters Lake - Channel 10
- Pubnico - Channel 10
- River Hebert - Channel 10
- St. Margaret's Bay/Prospect Bay - Channel 10
- Shelburne/Barrington Passage - Channel 10
- Springhill - Channel 10
- Sydney - Channel 10
- Tidnish - Channel 10
- Truro/Bible Hill - Channel 10
- Yarmouth - Channel 10

=== New Brunswick ===
- Strait Shores - Channel 14
  - Community programs provided from Amherst, Nova Scotia
- Sackville - Channel 10
  - Community programs provided from Amherst, Nova Scotia

=== Prince Edward Island ===
- Charlottetown - Channel 10
- Summerside - Channel 10
- Rural areas - Channel 10

=== Newfoundland and Labrador ===
- Bay Roberts - Channel 10
- Clarenville - Channel 10
- Lewisporte - Channel 10
- Marysvale - Channel 10
- Springdale - Channel 10
- Stephenville - Channel 10
- Marystown - Channel 10

=== Ontario ===
- Elliot Lake
- Greater Sudbury - Channel 10 SD/Channel 610 HD
- Kapuskasing
- Kirkland Lake
- Sauble Beach
- Saugeen Shores
- Temiskaming Shores
- Timmins
- West Nipissing
