= TV Rogers =

Programming
- Language: French

Ownership
- Owner: Rogers Communications
- Sister channels: Rogers TV

History
- Launched: 1968
- Former names: Télévision Rogers

Links
- Website: www.tvrogers.com

TV Rogers is the French-language sister station of Rogers TV, with a network of five stations in Ontario and New Brunswick, Canada.

Former logo

Former logo

== Programming ==
=== New Brunswick ===
Rogers offers French-language community channels in Edmundston, Bathurst, the Acadian Peninsula and Moncton. The programming shown on Rogers TV channels is a mix of access programming produced by the general public, and licensee programming originating from Rogers staff. Topics include political programming, sports coverage, live bingo shows, entertainment series, election coverage, telethons, municipal council coverage, documentaries and specials. In 2015, some cartoons discontinued from this channel, but reappeared on this channel since 2017, starting with The ZhuZhus (Frankie et les ZhuZhu Pets in French). Since January 2019, some cartoons have been completely discontinued.

== Stations ==
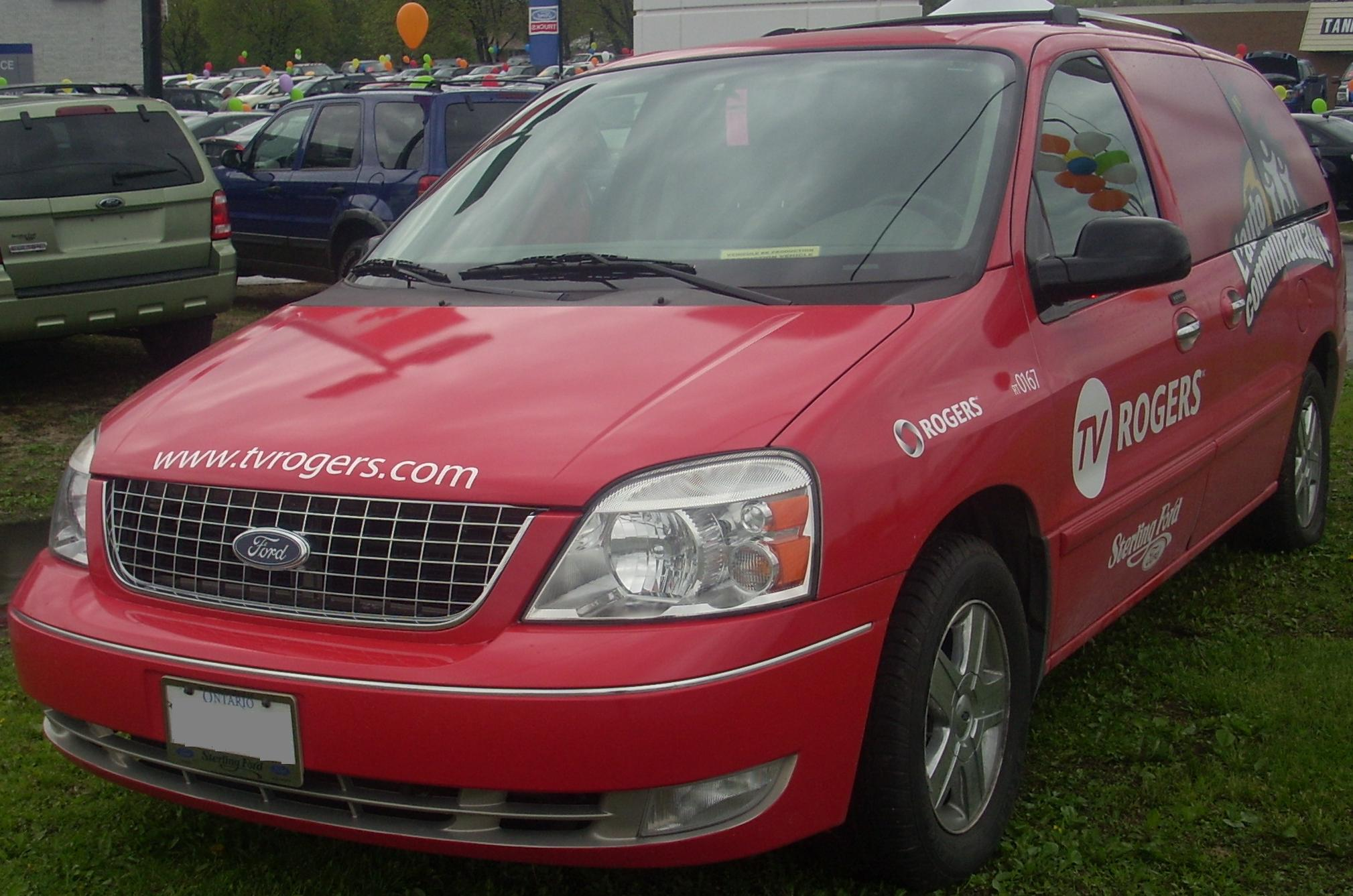
Ford Freestar from TV Rogers

=== New Brunswick ===
- Bathurst Channel 9
- Acadian Peninsula Channel 10
- Edmundston Channel 10
- Moncton Channel 9

=== Ontario ===
- Ottawa Channel 23

== See also ==
- Rogers TV
- TV1 (Canada), a counterpart launched by Bell Media
