= Rogers TV =

Canadian community-oriented TV network

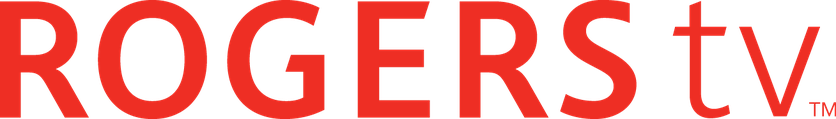
- Country: Canada
- Broadcast area: Regions in Canada

Programming
- Language: English

Ownership
- Owner: Rogers Communications
- Sister channels: TV Rogers

History
- Launched: 1968 (some areas); 2000 (current form)
- Former names: Rogers Television (1968–2008)

Links
- Website: www.rogerstv.com

Rogers TV (stylized as Rogers tv) is a group of English-language community channels owned by Rogers Communications. Many of these channels share common programs. Rogers TV broadcasts in the Canadian provinces of New Brunswick, Newfoundland and Labrador and Ontario. Rogers TV is available only in communities served by Rogers' cable and telecom division, and is not carried by other television service providers. Its French counterpart is TV Rogers.

Rogers TV serves over 2.3 million cable subscribers. Programming on the channels is produced with the assistance of volunteers and community partners and associations who assist with the production and content of these programs.

== History ==
Logo used from 2001 to 2008

Logo used from 2008 until sometime in 2016

Historically Rogers TV channels have been run as local public-access television channels; whereas some stations are still run as community access, most stations are run as community stations where production is done in-house with community involvement, or produced by local production studios that provide their shows to be aired by Rogers TV.

The present form of Rogers TV dates to 2000, when Rogers and Shaw Communications agreed to swap cable systems servicing British Columbia and Alberta by Rogers as well as Ontario, New Brunswick and Nova Scotia served by Shaw.

In April 2008, the company re-branded itself from Rogers Television to the simpler Rogers TV (TV Rogers for the French-language stations). As with most re-branding initiatives, it included a new logo (seen to the side), a revamped website, on-air graphics elements and new paint schemes for the network's large fleet of production vehicles. Some media critics speculated that the name change was done to bring the cable channels into line with the rest of Rogers Communications' media properties, notably Omni Television and the Citytv network. On September 1, 2016, Rogers TV was relaunched with a new look, consisting a new logo and a new on-air presentation.

In 2017 Rogers TV stations in the Greater Toronto Area closed as part of budget reallocations; this came in response to new CRTC regulations, allowing companies that co-own broadcast stations and cable providers in a metropolitan market to divert the mandatory funding for community channels to support local news operations for their broadcast stations.

== Programming ==
This programming was created in response to older Canadian Radio-television and Telecommunications Commission (CRTC) regulations which previously required that cable companies produce content reflecting the local community. Rogers TV annually receives applications from the community for new shows, and are reviewed by individual station managers and producers to access which programs can be produced with given production capabilities, likelihood of sponsorship, willingness of community involvement, and uniqueness of programming as major considerations. And because of CRTC requirements, the majority of the programs are produced in the local region of the station, while others are produced in neighbouring studios.

Some programs feature local journalists from radio, print and TV media. The programs are occasionally derivative of mainstream commercial fare with emphasis on the communities the stations are in.

=== New Brunswick ===
In New Brunswick, Rogers TV operates nine distinct community channels. Rogers offers French-language community channels (TV Rogers) in Edmundston, Bathurst, the Acadian Peninsula and Moncton, as well as English-language community channels in Fredericton, Saint John, Moncton, Miramichi and Bathurst. The programming shown on Rogers TV channels is a mix of access programming produced by the general public, and licensee programming originating from Rogers staff. Topics include political programming, sports coverage, live bingo shows, entertainment series, election coverage, telethons, municipal council coverage, documentaries and specials.

Notable examples of past successes include Acadieman – the world’s first animated Acadian superhero; the Afternoon News with Tom Young – a simulcast of the popular Rogers Radio show; 2 Bon’Heures – the region’s only early-morning French-language studio talk show; and First Local – a live, daily 15 minute news show with stories from around the province.

Cable companies have been offering community channels in New Brunswick for 40 years. Fundy Cable started setting up community channels in Saint John and Edmundston in the early 1970s. Shaw Cable acquired the New Brunswick cable licenses from Fundy Cable in 1998. Rogers TV in New Brunswick was formerly known as TVNB, a group of local community programming stations that became in 1998 the first provincial programming network in Canada not owned by a provincial government. Rogers and Shaw exchanged assets in the year 2000, and the stations were re-branded to Rogers Television in February 2002.

=== Newfoundland and Labrador ===
- Originally cable systems in St. John's (Avalon Cablevision), Gander (Omni Cablevision), Grand Falls-Windsor (Central Cable) & Corner Brook (Shellbird Cable) became part of the new Cable Atlantic cable system in 1990, which was sold to Rogers Cable in 2000.
- Local talk shows focused on community events air in St. John's (Out of the Fog), Gander (Skyways) and Grand Falls-Windsor (Exploits Central) and Corner Brook (Corner Brook Cafe).
- Jason Peircey, Mellissa Royal and Don-E-Coady host the show (Out OF The Fog) in St. John's.
- Kathryn Musseau hosts the show (Exploits Central) in Grand Falls-Windsor.
- Wendy Woodland is the host of (Corner Brook Cafe) in Corner Brook.
- Gina Brown is currently the host for Gander's local program, (Skyways).
- Programming in Channel-Port aux Basques is limited to Community Billboard.
- There is also some programming seen on all Newfoundland systems, such as One Chef One Critic (produced in St. John's), hosted by Central Dairies chef Steve Watson and The Telegram food critic (and former CBNT weather personality) Karl Wells. Also featured is the puppet hosted talk show (NL NOW) hosted by Gary Wheeseltin with all the puppetry being done by Jake Thompson.
- All stations air local municipal politics coverage in their respective areas.
- Rogers TV in Gander, Grand Falls-Windsor and Corner Brook also support local charities by holding bi-annual telethons to assist in raising funds. Some of the charities include Children's Wish Foundation, SPCA, Kiwanis Club, as well as the Lion's Club.
- Gander, Grand Falls-Windsor, and Corner Brook air bingo games in support of local charities. (Gander - Lion's Club, GFW - GFW Volunteer Fire Dept & Botwood Kinsmen, Corner Brook - Corner Brook Shrine Club)
- St. John's airs Newfoundland Growlers ECHL hockey for Saturday games. It is also aired on all Rogers TV stations across the province and also Eastlink TV, where Rogers TV is not available. Rogers TV St. John's has a long tradition of airing hockey in St. John's previously showing St. John's IceCaps AHL Hockey, QMJHL Hockey (St. John's Fog Devils and the original St. John's Maple Leafs AHL hockey team.
- St. John's airs all day live coverage of the Royal St. John's Regatta. Cable 9 has aired complete coverage since 1992, except for 2 years, once due to equipment upgrading, and once due to the production of a summer replacement show, Summerbreeze which has since been cancelled.
- Since 2011, Rogers TV shares most of its St. John's programming with Eastlink's community channel in Newfoundland and is regularly seen on each other's stations.

=== Ontario ===
- The variety show daytime is produced in many Ontario markets.
- In partnership with TVCogeco, Rogers Television in Ontario provides coverage of the Ontario Hockey League
- Tom Green started his career on the Rogers community channel in Ottawa. The Tom Green Show was based in Ottawa between 1993 and 1999.
- Puppet and former Muchmusic VJ Ed the Sock began on Newton Cable and continued on the Rogers Television station in Toronto after Rogers purchased Newton.
- Rogers also featured programs that were given international recognition such as "Talking Sex with Sue", "The Lemon-Aid Show" and "The Beaches Jazz Festival".
- In 1987 Rogers Television took over production of The Rob Cormier Show from Scarboro Cable.
- In 1995, Rogers Television in Toronto launched Cable 10%, the first multiseason Canadian television series targeted specifically to the lesbian, gay, bisexual and transgender community in Canada.
- In 1998, Rogers Cable 10 in Toronto launched "First Time Out", a community lifestyle program exploring urban culture.
- In 2008, Rogers Television presented exclusive coverage of the TSC Stores Tankard curling championship. The Fan 590's Dan Dunleavy served as the play by play announcer and former World Curling Champion Marilyn Bodogh was the color commentator. Rogers TV’s Matt McCooeye and David Hutchison also contributed.
- In 2008, Rogers TV Toronto broadcast 29 Toronto Marlies AHL regular season games.
- Rogers TV Toronto also features Our Toronto, a streeter based program featuring impromptu interviews; and Toronto Trivia, a look at the city's cultural festivals and special events.
- In Q2 of 2013 Rogers TV Launched Sports +. The Channel airs local sports and other programming from across the province. The channel is available on digital 368 (SD) and 369 (HD) to all Rogers Digital customers across the province of Ontario.
- In 2015 to present, Rogers TV aired Top Million Dollar Agent.
- In Barrie, Rogers TV airs Barrie Colts hockey games, with the commentary team of Mike Poirier and Gene Pereira.

== Rogers TV stations ==
Some programming is also available on the digital Rogers On Demand service.

=== New Brunswick ===
- Bathurst Channel 10
- Edmundston Channel 10
- Fredericton Channel 10
- Miramichi Channel 10
- Moncton Channel 10
- Saint John Channel 10

=== Newfoundland and Labrador ===
- Corner Brook Channel 9
- Gander Channel 9
- Grand Falls-Windsor Channel 9
- St. John's Channel 9
- Channel-Port aux Basques Channel 9

=== Ontario ===
- Barrie Channel 10
- Brantford Channel 20
- Durham Region Channels 10 & 63; eight full time staff were cut in 2017.
- Grey County Channel 53
- Guelph Channel 20
- Kitchener Channel 20
- London Channel 13 - HD Channel 510
- Orangeville Channel 63
- Ottawa Channel 22 - HD Channel 510; 5 laid off in 2017
- Simcoe County Channels 10 & 53; in May 2017, it was announced programming changes would be announced in "coming weeks".
- St. Thomas Channel 13
- Stratford Channel 20
- Strathroy-Caradoc Channel 13
- Tillsonburg Channel 13
- Woodstock Channel 13; one employee was laid off in 2017

Rogers also owns a stake in Cable 14, a community channel in Hamilton, Ontario co-owned with Cogeco and Source Cable.

== See also ==
- TV Rogers (French-language counterpart)
