= Media in Calgary =

This is a list of media outlets in the city of Calgary, Alberta, Canada.

== Radio ==
The city of Calgary has 33 terrestrial radio stations in which 8 are on the AM frequency and around 30 on the FM frequency.

AM/FM

Frequency	Call sign	Branding	Format	Owner	Notes
AM 660	CFFR	NewsRadio Calgary	all-news	Rogers Media	Signed off the air permanently July 7, 2026.
AM 700	CJLI	AM 700 The Light	Christian	Touch Canada Broadcasting	
AM 770	CHQR	QR Calgary	news/talk	Corus Entertainment	
AM 910	CKDQ	New Country 910 (now moved to 92.5)	country music	Stingray Radio	broadcasting from Drumheller
AM 960	CFAC	Sportsnet 960 The Fan	sports	Rogers Media	Signed off the air permanently July 7, 2026.
AM 1010	CBR	CBC Radio One	news/talk	Canadian Broadcasting Corporation	
AM 1060	CKMX	Funny 1060	comedy	Bell Media	airs a shortwave relay on 6.030 MHz with the call sign CFVP Signed off the air permanently June 14, 2023.
AM 1140	CHRB	AM 1140	Christian music	Golden West Broadcasting	broadcasts from High River
FM 88.1	CJWE-FM	CJWE 88.1 FM	country, First Nations community radio	Aboriginal Multi-Media Society	
FM 88.9	CJSI-FM	Shine FM	Christian music	Touch Canada Broadcasting	
FM 89.7	CBCX-FM	Ici Musique	public music	Canadian Broadcasting Corporation	French
FM 90.3	CKMP-FM	Amp Radio 90.3	contemporary hit radio	Stingray Radio	
FM 90.9	CJSW-FM	CJSW 90.9	campus radio	University of Calgary Student Radio Society	
FM 92.1	CJAY-FM	CJAY 92	active rock	Bell Media	
FM 92.9	CFEX-FM	X92.9	modern rock	Harvard Broadcasting	
FM 93.7	CKUA-FM-1	CKUA Radio Network	public broadcasting	CKUA Radio Foundation	Relays CKUA, Edmonton
FM 94.7	CHKF-FM	Fairchild Radio 94.7	Asian Canadian community	Fairchild Media Group	
FM 95.3	CKWD-FM	Wild 95.3	country	Jim Pattison Group	
FM 95.9	CHFM-FM	Star 95.9	adult contemporary	Rogers Media	
FM 96.9	CJAQ-FM	Jack FM	adult hits	Rogers Media	
FM 97.7	CHUP-FM	C97.7	hot adult contemporary	Rawlco Communications	
FM 98.5	CIBK-FM	Virgin Radio 98.5	contemporary hit radio	Bell Media	
FM 99.1	CBR-1-FM	CBC Radio One	public broadcasting	Canadian Broadcasting Corporation	simulcasts CBR 1010 AM
FM 99.7	CFXO-FM	Sun Country 99.7	country	Golden West Broadcasting	broadcasting from High River
FM 100.9	CKUV-FM	The Eagle 100.9	hot adult contemporary	Golden West Broadcasting	broadcasting from Okotoks
FM 101.5	CKCE-FM	101.5 Today Radio	hot adult contemporary	Jim Pattison Group	
FM 102.1	CBR-FM	CBC Music	public music	Canadian Broadcasting Corporation	
FM 102.7	VF5111	Punjabi Radio	Multicultural	International Education & Employment	
FM 103.1	CFXL-FM	XL103	classic hits/oldies	Stingray Radio	
FM 103.5	C103	Legacy 103	campus radio	Southern Alberta Institute of Technology	cable FM only
FM 103.9	CBRF-FM	Ici Radio-Canada Première	public broadcasting	Canadian Broadcasting Corporation	French; relays CHFA Edmonton
FM 105.1	CKRY-FM	Country 105	country music	Corus Entertainment	
FM 106.1	CFIT-FM	Air 106.1	hot adult contemporary	Golden West Broadcasting	broadcasting from Airdrie
FM 106.7	CKYR-FM	Red FM	Multicultural	Multicultural Broadcasting Corporation Inc.	
FM 107.3	CFGQ-FM	107.3 The Edge	classic alternative	Corus Entertainment	
FM 107.9	CIRI-FM	Traffic Advisory Radio	traffic information	City of Calgary	

Internet radio stations

Frequency	Branding	Format	Owner	Notes
Internet only	Falafel Frequencies	Multilingual, Community radio	N/A	Arabic, English
Internet only	Pamir Radio	Multilingual, Persian pop	N/A	Persian
Internet only	Spice Radio	Multilingual	Spice radio inc	Punjabi
Internet only	The Lynx Retro 80s	Classic hits	N/A	
Internet only	Zvuci Hrvatske Calgary	Multilingual	Zvuci Hrvatske Calgary	Croatian

On November 9, 2011, a number of applications were filed to the CRTC for new radio stations to serve Calgary.

== Television ==
OTA virtual channel (PSIP)	OTA actual channel	Shaw Cable	Call sign	Network	Notes
2.1	25 (UHF)	7	CICT-DT	Global	
4.1	29 (UHF)	3	CFCN-DT	CTV	
5.1	20 (UHF)	8	CKAL-DT	Citytv	
9.1	21 (UHF)	6	CBRT-DT	CBC Television	
32.1	32 (UHF)	51	CKCS-DT	Yes TV	
38.1	34 (UHF)	4	CJCO-DT	Omni Television	News programming originates from CJEO-DT (Edmonton), or CFMT-DT/CJMT-DT (Toronto).
–	–	10	Shaw TV Calgary	Shaw TV	Community channel for Shaw Cable subscribers.

CTV Two Alberta ceased broadcasting over-the-air in Calgary on August 31, 2011.

The incumbent cable television provider in Calgary is Shaw Cable. Network programming from the United States is received on cable via affiliates from Spokane, Washington. While prime time in most of Canada runs from 8 pm to 11 pm, American prime time shows on weekdays run from 9 pm to midnight in Calgary, since Spokane is in the Pacific Time Zone. Although Calgary is in the Mountain Time Zone, many of the American cities closer to Calgary didn't have full network service until the late 1980s. Calgary has more than double the population of the Spokane stations' American coverage area. In particular, Spokane's PBS member station, KSPS-TV, has long relied on viewership in Calgary. Except for PBS, HDTV network programming is from Seattle, not Spokane.

On digital cable, U.S. network programming (in standard definition) is available from Detroit, Michigan in the Eastern Time Zone. Prime time shows on weekdays run from 6 to 9 pm. Via digital cable, Calgary customers can also receive broadcasts from other CTV and CBC markets across Canada.

See also .

== Newspapers ==
=== Daily (paid purchase) ===
- Calgary Herald - Broadsheet format. Owned by Postmedia Network.
- Calgary Sun - Tabloid format. Owned by Postmedia Network.

=== Daily (free) ===
- Metro News, a Calgary franchise of Metro International

=== Semi-Weekly ===
- Calgary Citizen, self-described as "2x weekly", but appear to publish on Tuesdays, Thursdays, and Saturdays. Owned by Overstory Media Group.
- Calgary Tech Journal, published on Wednesdays and Sundays. Owned by Overstory Media Group.

=== Weekly ===
- Epoch Times - The general consensus among scholars and professors is that The Epoch Times is a "mouthpiece" of the Falun Gong movement, "heavily biased", and "lacks credibility." It has been called a "known disinformation operation."
- Coffee news - weekly fun news and community business marketing tool displayed primarily in local restaurants and coffee shops.
- Vision Times Calgary - free weekly Chinese newspaper that focus on balanced and in-depth reporting and promote traditional Chinese culture.
- Sing Tao - free weekly Chinese newspaper, pro-communist paper with self-censored news.

=== Monthly ===
- City Light News - A Christian monthly newspaper.
- BeatRoute- Monthly alternative arts paper.
- Kerby News - a seniors-focused newspaper published out of the Kerby Centre
- The Calgary Journal - Community-focused newspaper with an aim to cover stories that are not covered heavily by other major media outlets.
- Calgary's Child Magazine - Family friendly focused magazine with parenting tips, news and local advertisers.

=== Student ===
The city's four major post-secondary institutions publish student-run newspapers that are circulated throughout Calgary:

- The Gauntlet (University of Calgary)
- The Journal (Mount Royal University)
- The Reflector (Mount Royal University)
- The Weal (Southern Alberta Institute of Technology).

=== Defunct ===
The following newspapers served Calgary and area, but are no longer published.

- The Albertan - broadsheet daily which served Calgary from 1901 to 1980, at which point it was replaced by the tabloid-format Calgary Sun.
- North Hill News - community weekly founded in the 1950s; later amalgamated with The Calgary Mirror.
- The Calgary Mirror - community weekly, c.1970s to 2001; published by Sun Media during its final decade.
- Fast Forward Weekly (FFWD) - free weekly newspaper, published from 1995 to 2015
- The Calgary Straight - alternative news/entertainment weekly published from 1998 to 2002. Short-lived Calgary expansion of B.C.'s The Georgia Straight.
- FYI Calgary In-Print - community weekly published January to May 2001 by Sun Media as successor to the Mirror. Tied into a news website initiative of Sun Media; later, the idea was revived as 24 Hours.
- Dose - free daily newspaper, 2005–2006, published by CanWest. Later became a website. Succeeded by RushHour.

== See also ==
- List of newspapers in Canada
- List of radio stations in Alberta
- List of television stations in Alberta
