= CKXY-FM =

Radio station in Cochrane, Alberta

Coordinates: 51.298°N 113.989°W

- Cochrane, Alberta; Canada
- Frequency: 91.5 MHz (FM)
- Branding: 91.5 Cochrane Now

Programming
- Format: Country

Ownership
- Owner: Golden West Broadcasting
- Sister stations: CFIT-FM, CKMR-FM, CFXO-FM, CKUV-FM, CHRB

History
- First air date: October 24, 2019

Technical information
- Class: B1
- ERP: 4.7 kWs average 10 kWs peak
- HAAT: 118.1 meters (387 ft)

Links
- Website: cochranenow.com

CKXY-FM (91.5 FM, 91.5 Cochrane Now) is a radio station licensed to Cochrane, Alberta. Owned by Golden West Broadcasting, it broadcasts a country format.

== History ==
In February 2007, Tiessen Media received CRTC approval to add a rebroadcaster of CFIT-FM/Airdrie at 95.3 FM in Cochrane, Alberta. In March 2009, the CRTC approved an application by Tiessen to move CFIT-FM-1's transmitter to a new location with a higher elevation, and change its frequency to 91.5. Tiessen cited that this would improve reception (especially among those commuting from Calgary), and allow it to be fed over-the-air by CFIT's main signal.

On July 9, 2015, CFIT's current owner Golden West Broadcasting submitted an application with the CRTC to convert CFIT-FM-1 into a new standalone station serving Cochrane, proposing a country format with a focus on local news and information. The application was denied by the CRTC, which doubted the economic feasibility of the station without soliciting advertising sales outside of Cochrane (therefore diluting the revenue of Calgary-based stations).

On December 3, 2018, the CRTC approved a revised application for the station, citing that improving economic conditions and population growth in Cochrane had made it economically feasible to operate a standalone station in the town without diluting Calgary stations. Golden West specified a shorter signal range than the first application, and agreed to a condition of license prohibiting the station from soliciting advertising sales in the city of Calgary. Rawlco Communications intervened in support of the application due to Golden West's established experience in hyperlocal operations.

On October 24, 2019, the new station officially launched as 91.5 Cochrane Now, with the call letters CKXY-FM.

== Call letter history ==
The CKXY callsign was used at a number of unrelated defunct radio stations such as AM 1040 Vancouver, British Columbia in the late 1980's and 92.3 FM in Fort Smith, Northwest Territories, a repeater of CIRK-FM Edmonton, until it left the air in 2018.
