= CKMR-FM =

Radio station in Strathmore, Alberta

Coordinates: 51.035556°N 113.424722°W

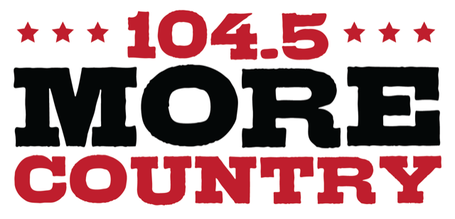
- Strathmore, Alberta; Canada
- Broadcast area: Wheatland County
- Frequency: 104.5 MHz
- Branding: 104.5 More Country

Programming
- Language: English
- Format: Country

Ownership
- Owner: Golden West Broadcasting
- Sister stations: CFIT-FM, CFXO-FM, CHRB, CKUV-FM, CKXY-FM

History
- First air date: September 27, 2018
- Former call signs: CKOV-FM (2018–2021)
- Call sign meaning: "Strathmore"

Technical information
- Class: B1
- ERP: 7,000 watts
- HAAT: 101.5 m

Links
- Website: strathmorenow.com/104-5-fm-blog

CKMR-FM (104.5 FM, 104.5 More Country) is a radio station in Strathmore, Alberta. Owned by Golden West Broadcasting, it broadcasts a country format.

== History ==
On December 9, 2014, Clear Sky Radio received approval from the Canadian Radio-television and Telecommunications Commission (CRTC) for a new FM radio station in Strathmore, Alberta. The new station planned to broadcast a country music format, and would operate at 104.5 MHz (channel 283B1) with an average effective radiated power (ERP) of 2,800 watts (maximum ERP of 7,000 watts with an effective height of antenna above average terrain of 101.5 metres).

In January 2018, prior to its launch, the CRTC approved the sale of a 25% stake in the station to Golden West Broadcasting (which would serve as operating partner), with the remainder held by Clear Sky Radio's owners Mary McKinnon Mills and Paul Larsen—all via licensee 2044577 Alberta Ltd. Clear Sky noted Golden West's experience with small-market stations, and stated that economic conditions had prevented it from fully realizing its plans for the market. The station officially launched September 27, 2018 as 104.5 More Country, with the call letters CKOV-FM.

In 2019, the remaining stake in the station was sold to Golden West. In March 2020, its call letters were changed to CKMR-FM; the CKOV calls returned to their heritage market of Kelowna in 2021 after Larsen's subsequent acquisition of CKOO-FM.

In November 2026, Golden West announced that it would swap CKMR and High River sister station CFXO-FM to Pattison Media in exchange for three Pattison stations in Red Deer and Rocky Mountain House.
