= CKRY =

CKRY may refer to:

- CKRY-FM
- Central Kansas Railway
