= Dan McLeod =

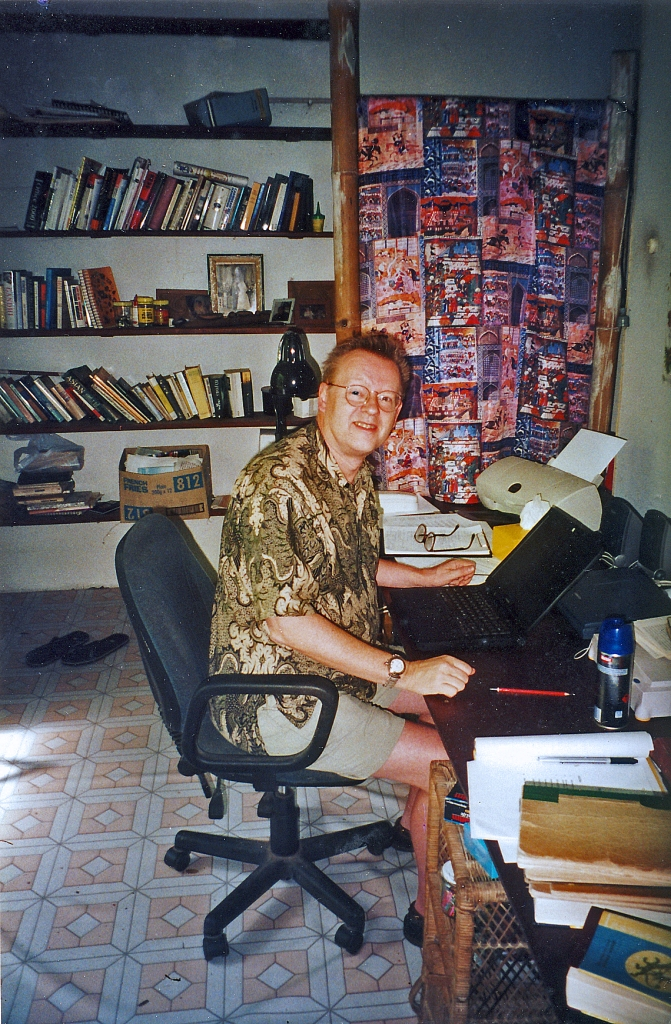
- Dan McLeod at work near Cooktown, Australia
- Born: Canada
- Citizenship: Canada
- Occupations: Journalist, writer
- Writing career
- Language: English
- Genre: Journalism

Dan McLeod (born 1943) is a Canadian writer and journalist. He is one of the founders and the former owner, publisher, and editor of the influential weekly newspaper, The Georgia Straight in Vancouver, British Columbia, Canada.

Dan was born and raised in Vancouver. He graduated from Kitsilano High School and went on to study mathematics and meteorology at the University of British Columbia, where Dan earned an Honours B.Sc degree in mathematics. He was also a poet, and after readings by the poet Charles Duncan (poet) at U.B.C. in the summer of 1961, he, with some friends, began a small newsletter, Tish, which he edited from about 1964 until The Georgia Straight was founded in 1967.

== Foundation of The Georgia Straight ==
"Legend has it the joint decision to start a so-called underground newspaper like the Village Voice was made at a party following a poetry reading by Leonard Cohen. McLeod emerged as the prime leader behind the idealistic, naive, frequently irresponsible, consistently cheeky, often insightful, collectively-run initiative because he was most willing to take the brunt of police persecution and unmitigated legal harassment that ensued."

In April 1967: "The proposed paper is christened The Georgia Straight over beer at the Cecil Hotel. The name aims to play on the fact that the weather forecasts will offer free publicity: they're always issuing gale warnings for The Georgia Strait."

The paper was founded by Pierre Coupey, Milton Acorn, Dan McLeod, Stan Persky, and others, and operated originally as a collective.

The first issue appeared on 5 May 1967 and cost a dime. It was at first a biweekly. On 12 May the paper moved into its first office at 432 Homer St., and soon after Dan was taken away in a paddy wagon and jailed for three hours for "investigation of vagrancy." College Printers refused to print the second issue, but an alternative printer was soon found. Dan continued to regularly find himself at odds with the Law, especially in the early days, and was even asked once by a policeman: "What do you want me to arrest you for—disturbing the peace?"

"The Straight" soon developed into an anti-establishment alternative newspaper with a focus on investigative reporting, and providing a voice for the growing alternative culture in Vancouver, which grew rapidly in the late 1960s with an influx of many thousands of Vietnam War draft dodgers and military deserters seeking refuge, as Canada remained neutral. This exodus was "the largest politically motivated migration from the United States since the United Empire Loyalists moved north to oppose the American Revolution."

"Then-editor (and now publisher) Dan McLeod was a grad student and a poet who strongly advocated press freedoms. He opened up the pages of the Straight as a forum for alternative opinions, which often got him in trouble with the law. Within the first two years of publication, McLeod and his paper were charged with 27 counts of obscenity, one charge of "counselling to commit an indictable offence" (for publishing tips on how to grow marijuana) and one count of criminal libel for comparing a judge to Pontius Pilate."

== Awards ==
In 1998, Dan won the Bruce Hutchison Lifetime Achievement Award from the Jack Webster Foundation.

In 2002, Dan McLeod was honoured with another Lifetime Achievement Award from the Western Magazine Awards Foundation.

== Recent activities ==
As of 2009, Dan McLeod still owns, edits and publishes The Georgia Straight, and he and his partner Yolanda Stepien, are involved in many philanthropic and other projects supporting the arts. They have two grown children. Their son, Matt, is currently VP of Operations for the Straight, while Yolanda is the Distribution Director.
