= Justin Wilcomes =

Justin Wilcomes (born April 16, 1979), also known as Drex, is an Australian radio host currently working in Canada.

== Early career ==
Originally from the Sunshine Coast Region in Queensland, he began his career in Australian community radio before joining Triple J in 1995. He remained with Triple J until 2001, and then worked for other Australian commercial radio stations until moving to British Columbia in 2009.

== Canada ==
His style, which has sometimes been compared to a more centrist or progressive version of in-your-face shock jocks such as Stan Zemanek or Howard Stern, became national news in December 2012 when, in an interview with British Columbia premier Christy Clark on CFCP-FM, he asked her a listener-submitted question about how she felt about being labelled a MILF. Following some controversy about the question, the station fired him in January 2013, although even Clark herself considered the controversy to be overblown, and he was offered a new job at CFOX-FM the very next day.

In 2014 he moved to sister station CKNW, hosting an evening talk show for the station. In 2018 this show was expanded into The Shift with Drex, airing on many of Corus Radio's talk stations across the country including CKNW, CHQR Calgary, CHED Edmonton, CJOB Winnipeg, CFMJ Toronto, CHML Hamilton and CFPL London. He left the show in June 2020 to pursue other opportunities, and joined CJAX-FM in Vancouver as its new morning host in December.

In fall 2022 he had to take several weeks off from CJAX after suffering a heart attack and undergoing surgery. but was back on air by spring 2023. His Jack FM show was cancelled in April 2024, and he was subsequently heard as a temporary fill-in host on Toronto stations CFIQ and Indie 88 in fall 2024.

In February 2025, Corus announced that The Drex Show will be added to the lineups of its Edge-branded modern rock radio stations, CFNY-FM in Toronto and CFGQ-FM in Calgary, beginning March 3.

== Personal life ==
Wilcomes, who is gay, married massage therapist Otto Chan in 2022, and has since sometimes gone by the names Justin Wilcomes-Chan or Drex Chan.
