= CFIT (disambiguation) =

CFIT most commonly refers to controlled flight into terrain. It may also refer to:

- The Cattell Culture Fair III IQ test
- CFIT-FM, a Canadian radio station
