= CHRB (AM) =

Christian radio station in High River, Alberta

Coordinates: 50.5783°N 113.8704°W

- High River, Alberta; Canada
- Broadcast area: Calgary Metropolitan Region; Southern Alberta
- Frequency: 1140 kHz (AM)
- Branding: AM 1140

Programming
- Format: Christian

Ownership
- Owner: Golden West Broadcasting
- Sister stations: CKMR-FM, CFXO-FM, CKUV-FM, CFIT-FM, CKXY-FM

History
- First air date: 1977

Technical information
- Class: B
- Power: 50 kW (daytime); 46 kW (nighttime)

Links
- Website: highriveronline.com/radio/am1140

CHRB (1140 kHz, AM 1140) is a radio station licensed to High River, Alberta, Canada. Owned by Golden West Broadcasting, it broadcasts a Christian format.

It first began broadcasting in 1977 on 1280 kHz before moving to its current frequency in 1996. CHRB is a Class B station broadcasting on a clear-channel frequency with daytime power of 50,000 watts, and nighttime power of 46,000 watts; a directional antenna is used at all times. Its Class B status indicates that it is not a clear-channel station, but it does broadcast on the clear-channel frequency of 1140 kHz, on which Class A status is shared by Mexico and the U.S.
