= CFXL-FM =

Radio station in Calgary

- Calgary, Alberta; Canada
- Broadcast area: Calgary Metropolitan Region
- Frequency: 103.1 MHz
- Branding: XL 103

Programming
- Format: Classic hits

Ownership
- Owner: Stingray Group
- Sister stations: CKMP-FM, CHUP-FM

History
- First air date: August 30, 2002
- Former call signs: CIQX-FM (2001–2008)
- Call sign meaning: XL

Technical information
- Facility ID: 6935
- ERP: 100,000 watts
- HAAT: 342.2 metres (1,123 ft)
- Transmitter coordinates: 51.0725°N 114.261°W

Links
- Webcast: Listen Live (Canada Only)
- Website: xl103calgary.com

Former logo

CFXL-FM (103.1 FM, XL 103) is a radio station in Calgary, Alberta. Owned by Stingray Group, it broadcasts a classic hits format. CFXL's studios are located on Centre Street Northeast just north of downtown Calgary, while its transmitter is located on Old Banff Coach Road in western Calgary.

As of Winter 2020, CFXL is the 6th-most-listened-to radio station in the Calgary market according to a PPM data report released by Numeris.

== History ==
The station officially began broadcasting on August 30, 2002, at 1:03 pm, with the call sign CIQX-FM and the brand name The Breeze. However, the station was rebranded on December 26, 2005, as California 103, a soft adult contemporary/smooth jazz format.

On March 3, 2008, at 3:00 pm, the station switched to its current classic hits format branded as XL103. The last song played on "California" was "Like a Lover" by Emilie-Claire Barlow while the first song played on "XL" was "Crocodile Rock" by Elton John.

The station's license was originally awarded to Telemedia; prior to its launch, Telemedia's Alberta stations were sold to Newcap Radio, with Standard Broadcasting as minority shareholder until 2007. The station adopted its current call sign on June 5, 2008, shortly after the former CFXL-FM in High River changed its own call sign to CKUV-FM.
