= CIRI-FM =

Traffic advisory radio station in Calgary

- Calgary, Alberta; Canada
- Broadcast area: Calgary Metropolitan Region, Bow Valley
- Frequency: 107.9 MHz
- Branding: Traffic Advisory Radio

Programming
- Format: Highway advisory radio

Ownership
- Owner: City of Calgary

History
- First air date: 2006
- Former frequencies: 97.5 MHz (2006–2008); 106.5 MHz (2008–2020)

Technical information
- Licensing authority: CRTC
- ERP: 37.7 watts
- HAAT: 67.9 metres (223 ft)
- Transmitter coordinates: 51°02′57″N 113°59′45″W

CIRI-FM is a traffic advisory radio station that operates at 107.9 FM in Calgary, Alberta, Canada.

Owned by the City of Calgary, the station began broadcasting at 97.5 MHz as part of a year-long pilot project in 2006. It moved to its former 106.5 MHz frequency in early 2008 to make way for the new CIGY-FM, which launched on March 6, 2008 on the adjacent 97.7 FM frequency. In 2013, a new radio station (CKYR-FM) was launched on the adjacent frequency at 106.7 FM while CIRI-FM remained at 106.5, until the station received an upgrade on October 15, 2020 to replace the broadcasting equipment and relocate the transmitter to a more central location, thereby increasing the radio's coverage area over Calgary at its new current frequency 107.9 FM.
