= CKMP-FM =

Radio station in Calgary

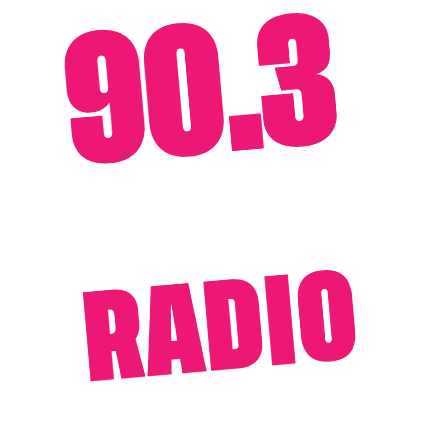
- Calgary, Alberta; Canada
- Broadcast area: Calgary Metropolitan Region
- Frequency: 90.3 MHz
- Branding: 90.3 Amp Radio

Programming
- Format: Contemporary hit radio

Ownership
- Owner: Stingray Group
- Sister stations: CHUP-FM, CFXL-FM

History
- First air date: March 19, 2007
- Former call signs: CFUL-FM (2007–2009)
- Call sign meaning: From "Amp"

Technical information
- Class: C
- ERP: 100,000 watts
- HAAT: 342.2 metres (1,123 ft)
- Transmitter coordinates: 51.075°N 114.261°W

Links
- Website: ampcalgary.com

CKMP-FM (90.3 FM, "90.3 Amp Radio") is a radio station in Calgary, Alberta. Owned by Stingray Radio, it broadcasts a contemporary hit radio format.

CKMP's studios are located on Centre Street in Eau Claire, while its transmitter is located on Old Banff Coach Road. As of Fall 2023, CKMP is the 2nd-most-listened-to radio station in the Calgary market according to a PPM data report released by Numeris.

== History ==
=== Fuel (2007–2009) ===
On August 2, 2006, the Canadian Radio-television and Telecommunications Commission (CRTC) approved an application by Newcap Broadcasting for a new adult album alternative radio station to serve the city of Calgary. The station soft launched for testing on March 17, 2007 under the brand name Fuel 90.3, with the callsign CFUL-FM.

Program director Murray Brookshaw explained that the main goal of Fuel was to "respect the music of the past but [..] uncover the new as well", promising a balance between classic rock hits and modern material. Among the station's initial on-air personalities were two alumni from CFGQ-FM, including morning co-host Frazier (who worked a similar position at CFGQ when it was the top 40-formatted Power 107), and midday host Laurie Healey (who worked for the station when it was the adult contemporary-formatted The Peak 107.3).

In 2009, the CRTC approved a request by Newcap to increase the power of CFUL's signal to an effective radiated power of 100,000 watts.

=== Amp Radio (2009–present) ===
On June 20, 2009, at 6PM, after playing "Know Your Enemy" by Green Day, CFUL flipped to Top 40/CHR as 90.3 Amp Radio; the new format launched with a marathon of 10,000 songs played commercial-free, with the first being "Don't Stop the Music" by Rihanna. Afterwards, the station changed its call sign to CKMP-FM.

Former Amp Radio 90.3 logo

Following the switch to Amp, the station began attracting controversy for a number of unconventional on-air promotions. In June 2011, CKMP held a contest known as Breast Summer Ever—in which the station would give away a breast implant, valued at $10,000. Entrants submitted a photo of themselves and explained why they wanted the implant; a shortlist of 10 entries were chosen by judges, and the winner was decided by an online poll. The contest was met with mixed reaction; the station's program manager Kris Mazurak stated that the contest had received a positive reaction, given that "somebody out there that wants that prize", while a critic believed that the promotion could have a positive response if the prize were to go to someone in legitimate need of a breast implant, such as a woman suffering from breast cancer. However, the station also received criticism for the promotion, particularly from those who felt that it was sexist and promoted the objectification of women (even though the station did not specifically restrict the contest to females), and the Canadian Broadcast Standards Council received two complaints about the contest upon its introduction. After receiving 76% of 30,000 votes, the implant was awarded to a trans woman who had been affected by the provincial government's decision to drop funding for gender reassignment operations as part of budget cuts.

In March 2013, CKMP's morning show held a stunt contest entitled Bank It or Burn It, in which listeners were asked to vote via social media on whether $5,000 in cash would be saved, or burned in an incinerator. If a majority of listeners voted to save the money, those who voted in favor would be entered into a contest with the money as a prize. Ultimately, 54% of viewers voted in favour of burning the money, which was presented in a video set to Ellie Goulding's song "Burn". Reaction to the stunt was negative; local charities complained that the money could have been donated instead of burned (and in turn, encouraged listeners to donate themselves), a listener started a petition demanding that CKMP be taken off the air, and others questioned the legality of the stunt—however, Canadian law only bans the burning of coins, and not paper currency. Morning show host Katie Summers defended the stunt, stating that "Part of me is glad we burned the money. A week ago, all of the same people and all of the same charities in this city were just as in need. Only now, after an awfully tragic social experiment, are they the forefront of everyone's mind. Maybe this sparked a conversation we needed to have." In turn, the station announced it would perform a second round of Bank It or Burn It, but with $10,000 instead. This time, listeners voted to save the money; additionally, the station announced that it would donate $10,000 to the Children's Wish Foundation in the name of the contest's winner.

==== 2014 "QuickHitz" re-launch ====
On July 22, 2014, CKMP's program director Paul Kaye left the station to pursue a position at newly acquired sister station CKZZ-FM in Vancouver. At the same time, the station dropped its on-air talent and began promoting an impending "update" on August 1 at 9:00 a.m. At that time, CKMP re-launched as simply 90.3 Amp; while staying as a top 40 station, CKMP adopted a new syndicated format known as "QuickHitz", in which the station played edited versions of songs that had been cut to one-and-a-half to two minutes in length, primarily by removing additional choruses and shortening intros. The station promoted that under the new format, it could play approximately 24 songs per hour with only 9 minutes of commercials—doubling the amount of total music played per-hour. Developed by the Vancouver-based firm Sparknet Communications, CKMP was the first Canadian station to adopt the QuickHitz format full-time—it was first introduced by a station in the United States in September 2013. The format featured hourly "First Play" tracks, highlighting songs trending on social media and charting in other countries.

Steve Jones, Newcap Radio's vice president of programming, explained that the format was designed to suit modern listening habits; research concluded that the convention of three to four-and-a-half minute radio edits (a concept which dates back to the 1950s and the need to fit singles on 45 rpm records) was dated, as listeners would use their portable music players to skip through and only listen to portions of songs—developing a short attention span to music. He also noted that with the ability to hear at least six to eight songs in a fifteen-minute span, listeners would feel a better "sense of momentum and energy" with the new format. Newcap chose to pilot the format in Calgary, noting the tight market for CHR stations, and because Calgary was a "progressive, young forward-thinking city"; the company did not rule out implementing the format on its other stations.

The new format was met with mixed reception; musician Jann Arden made numerous remarks attacking CKMP on Twitter (despite her music not being played by the station because it does not fit its format), contending that the edited songs were unethical and disrespectful to the artists work. She called for a boycott of CKMP due to the changes, and among other remarks, jokingly announced that the NHL had shortened its games to be only one period long, and asked her followers to recommend her "half a good book" to read. In response to the boycott, Newcap pulled Jann Arden's music from all of its stations. Jones stated that the response to the format was "generally quite favourable", with many listeners praising the increased amount of music, but noted that Arden was the only artist to have complained about it yet.

Previous Amp Radio 90.3 logo

After only three weeks with the format, CKMP dropped QuickHitz on August 19, 2014, and reverted to a standard top 40 format. Jones admitted that while the format "was greeted with a lot of curiosity", Newcap had received a number of legal threats about the format, particularly from Canadian artists. He explained that "in order to successfully do this we were going to face a lengthy and divisive and expensive legal process that we weren't willing to do right now, especially when some of those would come from the very content providers we work with—they are partners in our success." In regards to Arden's complaints, Jones stated that "we have tremendous amount of respect for the artists that we play and the artists we don't play, and the music they make", but admitted that he foresaw the possibility of complaints.

In January 2019, Stingray began to syndicate a repackaged version of CKMP's Katie & Ed morning show as a national evening show on its other CHR and hot adult contemporary-formatted stations.
