= CICT-DT =

Television station in Calgary

- Calgary, Alberta; Canada
- Channels: Digital: 25 (UHF); Virtual: 2
- Branding: Global Calgary (general); Global News (newscasts)

Programming
- Affiliations: 2.1: Global

Ownership
- Owner: Corus Entertainment; (Corus Television Limited Partnership)
- Sister stations: TV: CISA-DT; Radio: CHQR, CFGQ-FM, CKRY-FM

History
- First air date: October 8, 1954
- Former call signs: CHCT-TV (1954–1968); CFAC-TV (1968–1990); CKKX-TV (1990–1993); CICT-TV (1993–2011)
- Former channel numbers: Analogue: 2 (VHF, 1954–2011); Digital: 41 (UHF, 2009–2020)
- Former affiliations: CBC (1954–1975); Independent (1975–2000); Global (secondary, 1988–2000)
- Call sign meaning: Independent Calgary Television

Technical information
- Licensing authority: CRTC
- ERP: 48 kW
- HAAT: 369.5 m (1,212 ft)
- Transmitter coordinates: 51°4′21″N 114°15′38″W
- Translator(s): see § Transmitters

Links
- Website: Global Calgary

CICT-DT (channel 2, cable channel 7) is a television station in Calgary, Alberta, Canada, owned and operated by the Global Television Network, a division of Corus Entertainment. The station has studios at the Calgary Television Centre at the intersection of 23 Street Northeast and Barlow Trail in northeast Calgary, near the Mayland Heights neighbourhood; its transmitter is located near the intersection of Old Banff Coach Road/Highway 563 and Artists View Drive, west of the Calgary city limits. Until August 29, 2022, CICT-DT served as the master control hub for all 15 Global owned-and-operated stations across Canada.

== History ==
CICT-TV first signed on the air on October 8, 1954, as CHCT-TV, and was the first television station in the province of Alberta (as a result, it is also the oldest television station in the country that is part of the Global Television Network). The station was originally an affiliate of CBC Television. Its studios, offices and transmitter facility were located on a hill seven miles (11 km) west of the city. The station was owned by Calgary Television Ltd., a consortium of Calgary radio stations CFCN, CFAC and CKXL. The "CT" in CHCT stood for "Calgary Television".

During the construction of the transmitter, the 70-foot (21 m), 5-ton antenna was being hoisted on the top of the 600-foot (180 m) tower when the cable snapped and the antenna fell all the way down the tower to imbed itself 15 feet (4.6 m) in the ground. No one was injured in the accident, and the antenna was able to be repaired, but the station's launch was delayed by 10 days. A year later, CHCT moved its studios and offices from the transmitter site on Old Banff Coach Road, to a renovated badminton club/sea cadet drill hall on 955 Rideau Road S.W. in Calgary.

CICT-TV's logo montage of its different logos over the years, from the station's former website.

Notable programs that were produced at the original studio include Klara's Korner, a cooking show that was in national syndication for many years; Yan Can, a cooking show hosted by Martin Yan which later aired for many years on PBS in the United States as Yan Can Cook; Stampede Wrestling, which was produced for over 20 years, finding loyal audiences worldwide; and It Figures, which originated at the station and was produced for nearly 20 years.

In 1957, CKXL Ltd. sold its share in Calgary Television Ltd. to Fredrick Shaw, who had recently sold his share in CKXL-AM to Tel-Ray Ltd. The Love family, owners of CFCN, sold off its stake in 1961 when it opened its own station, CFCN-TV. In 1968, Tel-Ray sold its stake to Selkirk Communications, part-owner of CFAC radio alongside Southam Inc. This gave Selkirk full ownership of the station, and accordingly the callsign changed to CFAC-TV.

On September 1, 1975, after the CBC launched its own station in Calgary, CBRT (channel 9; prior to its sign-on, Calgary was the largest TV market in Canada without a CBC owned-and-operated station of its own), CFAC-TV disaffiliated from CBC and became an independent station. In 1979, the station branded itself as "2&7", the latter channel number referring to both its cable location and to sister station CFAC-TV7 in Lethbridge (now CISA). For a number of years afterwards, it continued to use the old CFAC "star" logo (modelled after the logo used by then-sister station CHCH in Hamilton, Ontario) alongside the 2&7 logo.

In 1981, the station moved to its current home, the Calgary Television Centre, a move reflecting its growth since its disaffiliation from the CBC. Soon after obtaining the television rights to the (then-newly relocated) Calgary Flames NHL franchise the year before, the station purchased a seven-camera mobile unit. The station has been the Flames' television partner since 1980. In the fall of 1982, the station became the first station in Calgary to begin broadcasting a 24-hour schedule. Programs seen during the overnight hours consisted of movies and reruns of The Jackie Gleason Show, among other shows.

Although it continued to nominally be an independent station, in 1988, CFAC-TV began airing some programs from the Global Television Network. In 1989, Maclean-Hunter purchased Selkirk Communications, but due to Canadian Radio-television and Telecommunications Commission (CRTC) ownership regulations at the time (Maclean-Hunter already owned CFCN-TV), CFAC-TV was sold to Western International Communications (WIC). A year after WIC bought channel 2, it changed the call letters to CKKX-TV. In 1992, CKKX's news operations were expanded with the acquisitions of a satellite uplink truck and a fleet of electronic news gathering microwave trucks.

Logo used as Calgary 7, used from 1993 to 2000. For logos used while as Global, refer to the Global Television Network article.

On September 7, 1993, CKKX changed its callsign to CICT-TV (for "Independent Calgary Television"), and also took on the brand of "Calgary 7", referring to the station's cable channel. Throughout the 1990s, prime time programming became a mix of Global-sourced shows and those either produced or acquired by WIC itself, including the nationally oriented newscast Canada Tonight. WIC's properties were split between Shaw Communications and Canwest in 1998. This move required CRTC approval, the plans for which were filed in 1999 and approved in 2000. Canwest acquired WIC's television assets, including CICT; incidentally, Shaw later bought Canwest's assets amidst the latter company seeking creditor protection in 2009, with the properties becoming the present-day Shaw Media (which is based in the same city).

On September 4, 2000, CICT joined the Global Television Network full-time as an owned-and-operated station, along with fellow Alberta stations CITV-TV in Edmonton and CISA in Lethbridge. By 2001, CICT-TV began relays in Drumheller (CICT-TV-1) and Banff (CICT-TV-2).

== Programming ==
CICT airs the entire Global programming lineup, operating on the same schedule as its Edmonton sister station CITV-DT. All non-news programming and some Calgary-based newscasts are also aired on fellow sister station CISA-DT in Lethbridge.

=== News operation ===
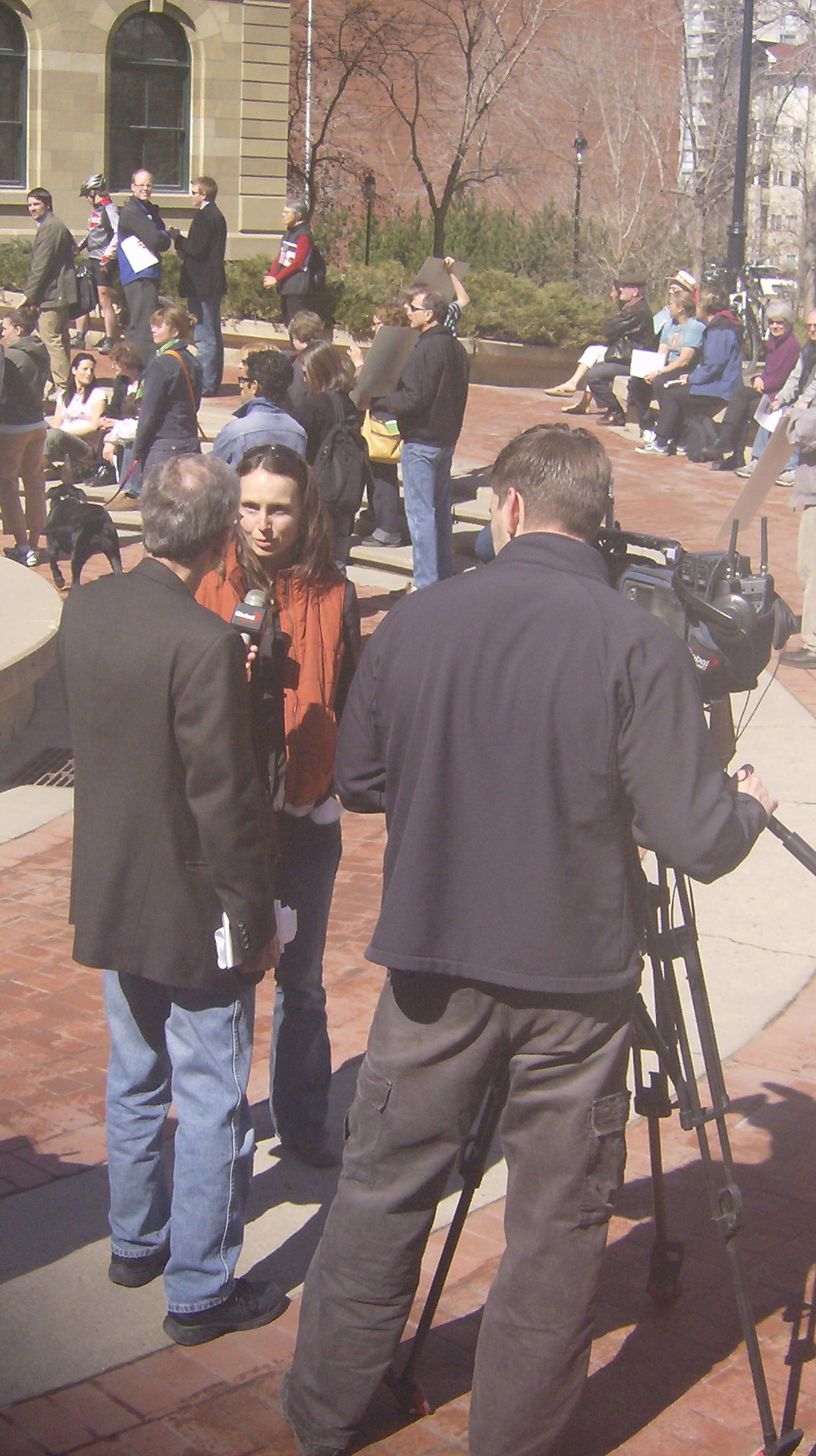
Meghan Beveridge with the Bow Riverkeeper organization is interviewed by Global Calgary reporter Louis Koutis at a rally on April 13, 2007, in Downtown Calgary.

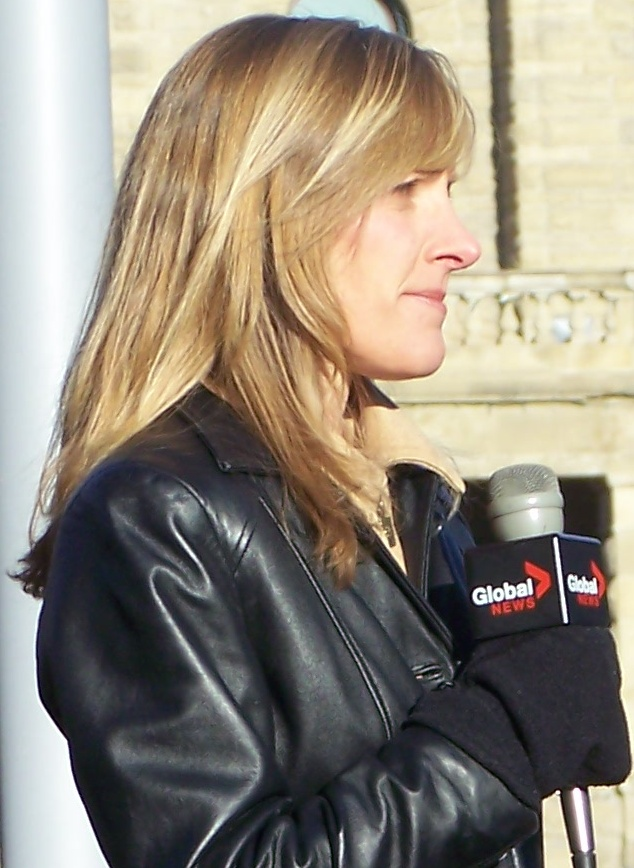
Carolyn Kury de Castillo reporting for Global Calgary at City Hall in 2008.

CICT presently broadcasts 46 1/2 hours of locally produced newscasts each week (with 7 1/2 hours each weekday and 4 1/2 hours each on Saturdays and Sundays); in regards to the number of hours devoted to news programming, it is the highest local newscast output out of any English-language television station in the Calgary market.

On April 11, 2007, CICT-DT became the first television station in Calgary to use a helicopter for newsgathering. Named "Global 1", it provides traffic reports on the Morning News in combination with in-studio traffic segments, and is also intended to provide breaking news coverage. The helicopter is also shared with CHQR (770 AM) during the morning and afternoon rush hour periods. CICT became the first television station in Calgary, and the second television station in the province of Alberta, to begin broadcasting its local newscasts in high definition on November 22, 2010; a new virtual set for the newscasts was also introduced on that date.

On September 11, 2011, CICT debuted a two-hour Sunday morning newscast, running from 8 to 10 a.m. Mountain Time. On August 27, 2012, the station expanded its weekday morning newscast to four hours, with the addition of a half-hour at 5 a.m., the 5–6 a.m. hour of the newscast being titled the Early Morning News; in addition on September 2, 2012, the station expanded its Sunday morning newscast to three hours with an additional hour at 7 a.m. The expansions of the morning newscasts were part of a benefits package that was included as a condition of the sale of the Global network to Shaw Communications.

In July 2026, Corus announced layoffs impacting the Global News division, which impacted 28 positions in Alberta; as part of the layoffs, CICT and Edmonton sister CITV will both centralize some production of their newscasts out of Toronto.

=== Notable former on-air staff ===
- Ashleigh Banfield
- Sandra Jansen
- Bruce McAllister
- Mike Toth
- Ed Whalen

== Technical information ==
=== Subchannel ===
Subchannel of CICT-DT
Subchannel	Res.	Short name	Programming
2.1	1080i	CICT-DT	Global

=== Analog-to-digital conversion ===
CICT-DT received a construction permit for channel 41 on March 5, 2009, and began broadcasting on May 25, 2009. On August 31, 2011, when Canadian television stations in CRTC-designated mandatory markets transitioned from analogue to digital broadcasts, the station's digital signal remained on UHF channel 41, using virtual channel 2.

As of July 28, 2020, due to the DTV spectrum repack happening across North America, CICT-DT has moved from UHF 41 to UHF 25. The virtual channel number remains as 2.1.

=== Transmitters ===
Station	City of licence	Channel	ERP	HAAT	Transmitter coordinates
CICT-TV-1	Drumheller	8 (VHF)	0.009 kW	NA	51°27′1″N 112°44′10″W
CICT-TV-2	Banff	13 (VHF)	0.009 kW	NA	51°11′53″N 115°36′47″W
