= The Georgia Straight =

Canadian newspaper in British Columbia

- Former editors: Dan McLeod, Charlie Smith, Ian Hanington, Beverley Sinclair, Charles Campbell, Bob Mercer, Nick Collier
- Categories: Alternative weekly newspaper
- Frequency: Weekly
- First issue: 1967; 59 years ago
- Company: Overstory Media Group
- Country: Canada
- Based in: Vancouver, British Columbia
- Language: English
- Website: www.straight.com
- ISSN: 1485-1318

The Georgia Straight is a free Canadian weekly news and entertainment newspaper published in Vancouver, British Columbia, by Overstory Media Group. Often known simply as The Straight, it is delivered to newsboxes, post-secondary schools, public libraries and a large variety of other locations. The Straight has a long history of independent, unconventional editorials and content, and is known as a vocal critic of government, notably the former Liberal government of Gordon Campbell.

As surveyed by VAC its per-issue circulation average as of January 25, 2011, was once 119,971 copies, and its average weekly readership was once 804,000 as of 2009. Its website traffic once ranked 92,215 globally and 5,395 within Canada, according to November 2, 2021, figures from Alexa.

In January 2020, the newspaper's acquisition by Media Central Corporation was announced, a few weeks after the same company announced a deal to acquire the similar Toronto publication Now. In September 2022, after Media Central Corporation filed for bankruptcy, The Straight was acquired by Overstory Media Group.

== History ==
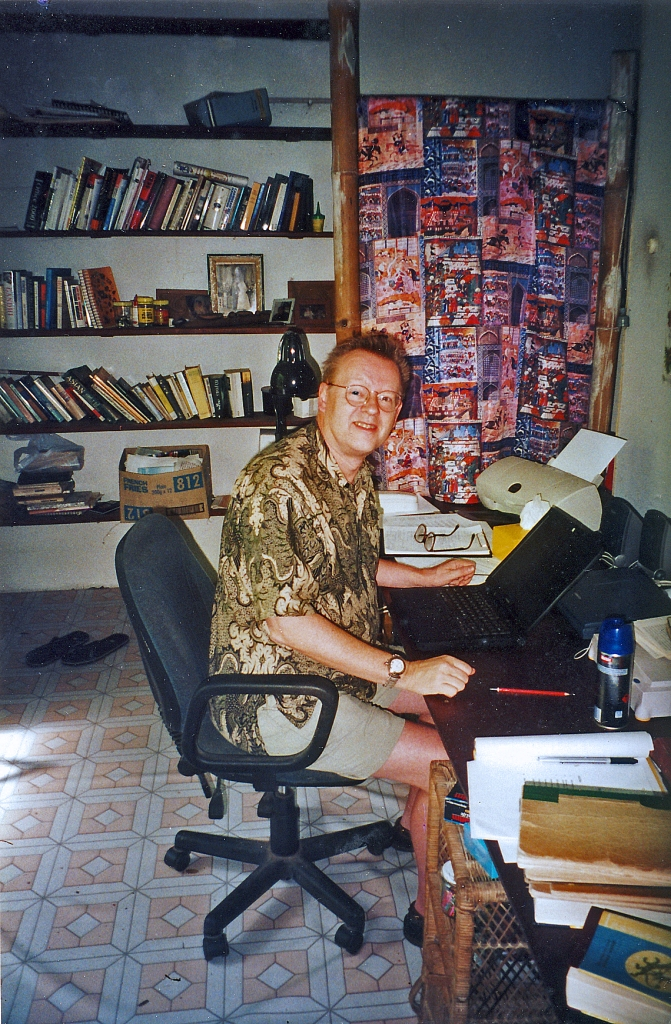
Dan McLeod working on the Straight while visiting Cooktown, Australia, circa 2000

The paper was founded as an underground newspaper in May 1967 by Pierre Coupey, Milton Acorn, Dan McLeod, Stan Persky, and others, and originally it operated as a collective.

In April 1967: "The proposed paper was christened the Georgia Straight over beer at the Cecil Hotel. The name aims to play on the fact that the weather forecasts will offer free publicity: they're always issuing gale warnings for the Georgia Strait."

On May 5, 1967, the first issue was presented and cost ten cents. It was originally a biweekly newspaper. On May 12, Dan McLeod was taken away in a paddy wagon and jailed for three hours for "investigation of vagrancy." College Printers refused to print the second issue, but an alternative was found.

In 1972, original staff members left Georgia Straight to publish the competitor bi-weekly The Grape.

=== Suspension over "obscenities" ===
On May 12, 1967, the paper was raided and fined by the Vancouver Police for publishing obscenities, and was often banned from distribution for its criticism of the local police and politicians. Vancouver mayor Tom Campbell described the paper as "filth" and, objecting of its sale to "school children," urged the city's licensing inspector to suspend the paper for "gross misconduct" contrary to city bylaws. The paper's business license was suspended September 9, 1967, making it illegal for them to sell papers.

McLeod announced that he would continue to publish, giving the paper away and asking for donations. During the time the license was suspended, city police attempted to confiscate the "free" papers and to take donation money away from vendors, though any who refused to hand over money or papers were left alone. In addition, McLeod and others associated with the paper were subjected to violent attacks.

The British Columbia Civil Liberties Association (BCCLA) challenged the suspension in court by arguing that only federal laws could restrict freedom-of-the-press. On this matter, the daily papers Vancouver Sun and The Province both weighed in on the side of the Georgia Straight. The initial challenge filed October 2, 1967 was unsuccessful, with Justice Thomas Dohm praising the mayor for his actions.

On October 6, the Canadian Post Office ruled that the paper was not obscene, allowing for distribution by mail; nonetheless, street vending remained illegal without a city business license. On appeal, the appellate court agreed to lift the suspension on the grounds that a hearing should have been provided to explain why the paper was suspended, but did not rule on the BCCLA's freedom-of-the-press argument.

The BCCLA provided further legal assistance to Dan McLeod and the paper when both were criminally charged with three counts of obscenity for publishing a photograph, an advertisement described as being titled "Young man wants to meet women to 30 years old for Muffdiving, etc," and an article titled "Penis de Milo Created by Cynthia Plaster-Caster." McLeod and the paper were acquitted on all three charges due to the Crown having failed to prove its case beyond a reasonable doubt, with the judge noting that no evidence was provided as to the meaning of the word muffdiving and that he could not take judicial notice of a word that he had not previously heard.

Those controversies ended in the 1970s, as the paper moved to become a more conventional news and entertainment weekly, albeit with a progressive editorial slant. Bob Geldof worked as a music journalist for the Georgia Straight in the 1970s before he returned to Ireland and joined the Boomtown Rats. In the mid-1990s a second Straight newspaper in Calgary, Alberta, called the Calgary Straight was produced, however, its existence was brief.

=== BC government tax case ===
Regulatory controversy erupted again in October 2003, when the provincial government sent The Straight a bill totalling more than $1 million for outstanding provincial sales tax. In British Columbia, print publications must have at least 25 per cent editorial content to be considered a newspaper, and qualify for exemption from PST on printing bills. The extensive "Time Out" listing of the paper, detailing the what and where of virtually every public event in the city, was judged to be advertising – pushing the paper below the required thresholds for a newspaper.

Publisher Dan McLeod said this re-interpretation of the rules was a politically motivated attempt to silence a persistent critic:

"We're the only paper that is consistently critical of the government in our editorials week after week, and we're the only paper that's being fined a million dollars," he said. "So I put two and two together."

However, not everyone agreed with McLeod's interpretation of events and pointed out that The Straight had a significantly lower editorial-to-advertising ratio than many other alternative and university papers. This highly public battle garnered considerable attention, and the BC government later reversed their decision, stating "clearly the Georgia Straight is a newspaper..."

2006 The Straight moves into its own completely renovated four-storey building at 1701 West Broadway. Architect J. Kerrigan Sproule upgrades a commercial building constructed in 1948 by adding one more level of underground parking and a fourth-floor amenity space with spectacular views of the city. The fourth-floor addition includes a kitchen, lunch room, exercise room, large patio area, and a shower for employees. (We hope the cyclists make use of it.) Extensive landscaping, including 11 trees and various shrubs, transforms the Pine Street side of the site and the back alley. The emblematic Mr. Wuxtry appears on a flag hanging on the Broadway side of the building. The Straight's move comes as this section of the Broadway corridor experiences significant growth with the addition of several new restaurants and retail outlets.

=== Acquisition by Media Central Corporation Inc. ===
On March 2, 2020, Media Central Corporation Inc. announced it has closed its acquisition of Vancouver Free Press Corp, owner and operator of the Georgia Straight. The company paid $1.25 million (included fees associated with the transaction) in cash and shares. Media Central Corporation filed for bankruptcy in March 2022. Long-time editors and contributors to the Georgia Straight continued publishing, even as regular paycheques stopped coming in.

=== Acquisition by Overstory Media Group ===
On September 27, 2022, Overstory Media Group announced it had acquired the assets of the Georgia Straight for an undisclosed sum. Around a dozen remaining employees at the Straight, including longstanding editor Charlie Smith, were fired shortly before the acquisition and did not receive unpaid wages, severance, or vacation pay. Overstory Media Group has declined to pay back wages, calling it the responsibility of the previous owner. On April 8, 2024, the BC Employment Standards Branch ruled that Overstory Media must pay $270,819.02 in unpaid wages to the group of former employees. Overstory Media made headlines in December 2023 for laying off employees who had voted to unionize in an apparent attempt to quash their union drive.

In March 2024, Overstory announced that former BC Premier and former Jim Pattison executive Glen Clark has taken over as Interim CEO. Clark resigned as Premier after Conflict of interest commissioner H.A.D. Oliver concluded in 2001 that Clark had violated conflict of interest laws in British Columbia.

== Readership ==
A readership survey conducted on behalf of The Georgia Straight in 2007 found that:

In its core market of the City of Vancouver, 61 percent of all adults 18+ reported reading a copy of the Georgia Straight within the past six issues. By comparison, 48% of respondents indicated reading the Vancouver Sun within the past six issues (past week). The Province followed with 41% reading a copy within the past six issues (past week). The free daily, 24 Hours, had a weekly (past six issue) readership of 38%, followed by Metro at 25%.

== Content ==
The Straight carries feature articles, ranging from social topics, such as drug use and gentrification to in-depth looks at cultural newsmakers like the writer Salman Rushdie. Former editor Charlie Smith has a record of covering women's movement issues as well as COVID-19, the climate, diverse communities, and arts and culture. There are also many articles and listings on lifestyle and entertainment, commenting on restaurants, new wines, new gadgets, designer clothes, and the latest in music, theatre, and movies. Rounding out the regular features are the American advice columnist Dan Savage with his Savage Love, commentator Gwynne Dyer, cartoons, and a local astrology column. The newspaper's editorial slant is strongly left wing as conceived in the Canadian political spectrum.

The Straight has been criticized for publishing cigarette and other tobacco advertising when most publications in Canada have declined to do so for moral and ethical reasons. And of promoting local events that had tobacco industry sponsorship, such as the formerly Benson and Hedges-sponsored Symphony of Fire. The Straight has long been condemned for this practice by the major health groups and, more recently, by Vancouver businessman and political candidate Dale Jackaman in a series of Google attack ads.

== See also ==
- List of newspapers in Canada
- List of underground newspapers of the 1960s counterculture
