= The Coast (newspaper) =

Canadian newspaper in Nova Scotia

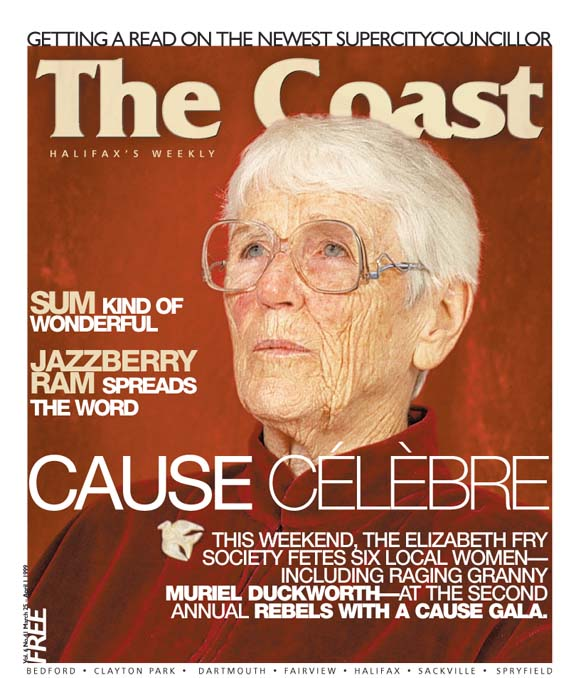
- Type: Alternative weekly
- Format: Tabloid
- Owner: Overstory Media Group
- Publisher: Christine Oreskovich
- Editor: Kyle Shaw
- Founded: 1993
- Language: English
- Headquarters: 2309 Maynard Street; Halifax, NS B3K 3T8; Canada
- Circulation: 22,961
- ISSN: 1497-0201
- Website: thecoast.ca

The Coast is a free alternative weekly newspaper in Halifax, Nova Scotia, Canada that was founded in 1993. Up until the COVID-19 pandemic, the paper distributed an estimated 24,000 copies per week throughout the Halifax Regional Municipality.

In March of 2020, the paper began shifting to a digital news outlet, and never fully returned to print. Occasional special one-off print issues of the paper's special editions, such as the Back to School edition and the Hot Summer Guide, were printed throughout the pandemic.

The paper was owned by founders Kyle Shaw and Christine Oreskovich until April 2022, when it was purchased by Overstory Media Group. Shaw and Oreskovich originally stayed on as managers, but both had left by June 2025.

The Coast has a generally left wing editorial policy. It focuses on local issues, especially "people working for change" within the community.

The Coast was available in print throughout Bedford, Lower Sackville, Tantallon, and the Stanfield International Airport, but 75 percent of its readership lived in downtown Halifax and Dartmouth.

The print paper claimed a readership of 61,263. According to a January 2007 Corporate Research Associates metro quarterly survey, 55 percent of The Coast's readers were between 18 and 34 years of age (34.701 readers).

== See also ==
- List of newspapers in Canada
