= CHRB =

CHRB may refer to:

- California Horse Racing Board, horse racing authority in California, United States
- CHRB (AM), a radio station licensed to High River, Alberta, Canada
- Corporate Human Rights Benchmark, an index that measures how companies perform according to the United Nations Guiding Principles on Business and Human Rights
