= CKYR-FM =

Radio station in Calgary

Coordinates: 51°04′21″N 114°15′38″W

- Calgary, Alberta; Canada
- Broadcast area: Calgary Metropolitan Region
- Frequency: 106.7 MHz
- Branding: RED FM Calgary

Programming
- Language: Multilingual
- Format: Multicultural

Ownership
- Owner: South Asian Broadcasting Corporation

History
- First air date: May 3, 2013

Technical information
- Class: B
- ERP: 1.1 kilowatts 8 kW Maximum
- HAAT: 236 metres (774 ft)

Links
- Webcast: Listen live
- Website: calgary.redfm.ca

CKYR-FM is a radio station which operates a multilingual/ethnic radio station on the frequency of 106.7 MHz/FM in Calgary, Alberta, Canada. CKYR's studios are located on Westwinds Drive Northeast in Calgary, while its transmitter is located on Old Banff Coach Road in western Calgary.

== History ==
On May 24, 2012, Multicultural Broadcasting Corporation Inc. received a licence from the Canadian Radio-television and Telecommunications Commission (CRTC) to operate a new ethnic commercial radio station to serve Calgary.

In February 2013, the station is doing on-air tests and will be branded as RED FM. The station launched on May 3, 2013.

== Notes ==
CIRI-FM, a very low power traffic radio station operating at 106.5 MHz is an adjacent frequency to the new proposed multicultural station at 106.7 MHz. CIRI remained at 106.5 FM, until the station moved to a new frequency in 2020.

== Programming ==
CKYR's programming is primarily South Asian (Hindi and Punjabi) but it also airs programming in the following languages: Akan, Arabic, Bengali, Croatian, Dari, Fijian, Gujarati, Korean, Pashto, Persian, Russian, Sindhi, Spanish, Tagalog, Tamil, Twi, Urdu, and Vietnamese.
