= Overstory Media Group =

Canadian media company

- Type: Private
- Industry: Mass media
- Founded: 2021; 5 years ago
- Founders: Farhan Mohamed; Andrew Wilkinson
- Headquarters: Victoria, British Columbia, Canada
- Areas served: British Columbia; Alberta; Nova Scotia
- Key people: Glen Clark (CEO)
- Website: www.overstorymedia.com

Overstory Media Group (OMG) is a Canadian media company based in Victoria, British Columbia. Established in 2021, the company owns 12 publications across three provinces, including The Coast and The Georgia Straight. Launching with plans to establish 50 new outlets and hire 250 new journalists, the company's workforce has instead decreased significantly, and they have come under scrutiny for alleged union busting. Editorial staff at Overstory Media Group's publications are expected to integrate artificial intelligence tools into their work.

== History ==
Overstory Media Group was established in 2021 by Farhan Mohamed and Andrew Wilkinson. Mohamed began his career in publishing in 2012 at the Vancity Buzz, a Vancouver-based blog, becoming its managing editor in 2014. Wilkinson, a multi-millionaire tech entrepreneur, established the Victoria-based newsletter Capital Daily in 2019. It quickly grew to a readership of 40,000 within its first year, laying the groundwork for the launch of OMG. Starting with ten outlets in British Columbia and Alberta, the company announced plans to establish 50 new outlets and employ 250 more journalists by 2023.

In April 2022, OMG acquired The Coast, a Halifax-based weekly. Later that year, the company acquired The Georgia Straight, a Vancouver-based weekly. The previous owner of The Georgia Straight, Media Central Corporation Inc., declared bankruptcy in March 2022. Roughly a dozen employees of the newspaper were fired as OMG assumed ownership.

In December 2022, OMG laid off three journalists: one at The Coast and two at Capital Daily. More layoffs followed in January 2023, when the company fired four of the remaining seven journalists at Capital Daily, including the managing editor, Jimmy Thomson. The editorial staff of Capital Daily was thus reduced by half. Three of those journalists were members of a union organizing committee working with CWA Canada to unionize OMG. The day after they were fired, CWA Canada filed an application with the Canada Industrial Relations Board (CIRB) for certification of the union, aiming to represent all of the remaining 27 employees of OMG not employed in sales or managerial positions. Overstory objected to their application, claiming that the company was not subject to federal jurisdiction as a publisher of local newsletters. The same day as the application, OMG solicited the services of the law firm Fasken LLP, described as a "union-busting law firm", with bills totaling over $60,000 across a span of two months. On 6 June 2024, CIRB ruled in favour of the company, finding that "Overstory is a written news organization that operates a series of publications in three provinces. Its normal and habitual activities do not involve interprovincial communications and broadcasting. ... The presumption of provincial jurisdiction has not been rebutted, and the Board does not have jurisdiction over Overstory's labour relations."

In March 2024, OMG's board of directors fired Mohamed as CEO, but he retained his seat on the board. Glen Clark, the former Premier of British Columbia, succeeded Mohamed as CEO later that month.

== Operations ==
Overstory Media Group publishes 12 newspapers and newsletters in three provinces, including British Columbia, Alberta, and Nova Scotia. The company directs its editorial staff to use artificial intelligence tools in their work; their AI usage policy states: "As part of our commitment to editorial excellence and operational efficiency, Overstory Media is implementing AI tools to enhance our editorial workflows. ... Starting Monday, June 2, 2025, all editorial teams across our publications are expected to integrate the following AI tools into their daily workflows." Their policy lists four AI tools to be used by staff: Otter.ai, Quillbot, Beehiiv, and Claude.ai. Tim Bousquet of the Halifax Examiner has opined that articles from The Coast bylined "Team Coast" may be entirely AI-generated.

== Publications ==
List of publications owned by Overstory Media Group
Title	Location	ISSN	Ref(s).
Burnaby Beacon	British Columbia	2819-0424	
Calgary Citizen	Alberta	2819-0467	
Calgary Tech Journal	Alberta	2819-0386	
Capital Daily	British Columbia	2819-0297	
The Coast	Nova Scotia	1497-0201	
Fraser Valley Current	British Columbia	2819-0432	
The Georgia Straight	British Columbia	0016-8432	
Oak Bay Local	British Columbia	N/A	
Tasting Victoria	British Columbia	2819-0459	
Vancouver Tech Journal	British Columbia	2819-0378	
Victoria Tech Journal	British Columbia	2819-0416	
The Westshore	British Columbia	2819-0440	

== See also ==
- History of Canadian newspapers
- List of newspapers in Canada
- Media of Canada
