= High River =

Town in Alberta, Canada

- Town
- Town of High River
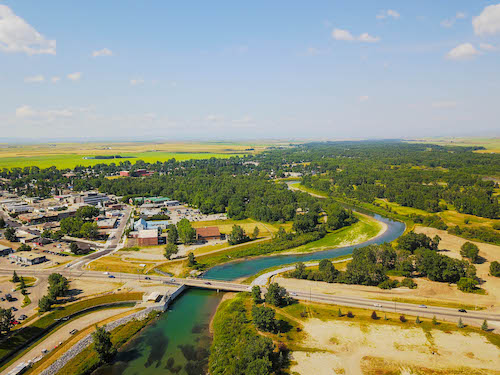
- Aerial view photo taken of downtown High River Alberta in July 2017

- Location of High River in Alberta
- Coordinates: 50°34′50.7″N 113°52′28.0″W
- Country: Canada
- Province: Alberta
- Region: Calgary
- Census division: 6
- Municipal district: Foothills County
- Incorporated
  - Village: December 6, 1901
  - Town: February 12, 1906

Government
  - Mayor: Craig Snodgrass
  - Governing body: High River Town Council: Cathy Couey; Jamie Kinghorn; Carol MacMillan; Michael Nychyk; Bruce Masterman; Don Moore
  - Manager: Tom Maier
  - MLA: Chelsae Petrovic

Area (2021)
  - Land: 22.19 km^{2} (8.57 sq mi)
- Elevation: 1,040 m (3,410 ft)

Population (2021)
  - Total: 14,324
  - Density: 645.4/km^{2} (1,672/sq mi)
  - Municipal census (2019): 14,052
  - Estimate (2020): 14,434
- Time zone: UTC−06:00 (Alberta Time)
- Forward sortation area: T1V
- Area codes: 403, 587, 825, 368
- Highways: Highway 2 Highway 23
- Waterway: Highwood River
- Website: Official website

High River is a town within the Calgary Metropolitan Region of Alberta, Canada. It is approximately 68 kilometres (42 mi) south of Calgary, at the junction of Alberta Highways 2 and 23. High River had a population of 14,324 in 2021.

== History ==
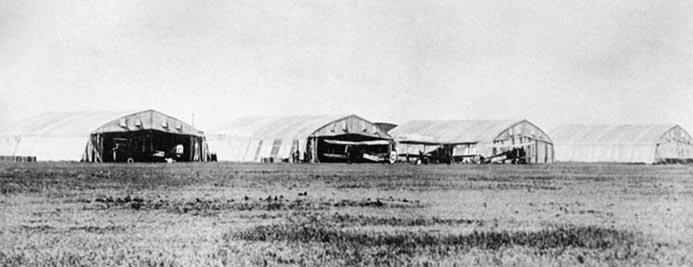
Hangars at the High River Air Station in 1922

The community takes its name from the Highwood River, which flows through the town. The area was originally inhabited largely by the Blackfoot First Nation, who called the site Ispitzee (or the "place of high trees along running water"). By 1870, after the arrival of the North-West Mounted Police and after Treaty Number 7 had been signed in 1877, settlers began arriving into the region. High River's development centred on a convenient location for people, horses and cattle to cross the Highwood River - a location known as "The Crossing".

Development of the town was supported by the completion of the Calgary and Edmonton Railway in 1892. High River incorporated as a village on December 5, 1901, and was incorporated as a town on February 12, 1906. Future Senator and area rancher Daniel Edward Riley would serve as the Town of High River's first mayor.

Although growth slowed during the First World War, it continued after the war with the building of brick structures and a number of industries. One of Canada's first air force stations was constructed to the east of the town in 1921 The establishment of a British Commonwealth Air Training Plan elementary flying training school at the same air station helped boost High River's economy during the Second World War.

High River continued to grow throughout the 1950s and 1960s. In the 1970s the downtown saw some major redevelopment, and redevelopment is continuing.

=== Floods ===
The Highwood River is subject to frequent flooding. Flood events of exceptional magnitude occurred in 1894, 1899, 1902, 1908, 1912, 1923, 1929, 1932, 1942, 1995, 2005 and 2013. Most recently during the 2013 Alberta floods, thousands of people in Alberta were ordered to evacuate their homes after the rise of the Highwood River, Bow River, Elbow River, Sheep River, and numerous others. In 2013, three people died as a result of the flooding of the Highwood River.

== Geography ==
=== Climate ===
High River experiences a humid continental climate (Köppen climate classification Dfb). Summer days are mild to warm with cool nights, while winters are cold and snowy with annual snowfall averaging 69 inches (175 cm).

Climate data for High River
| Month | Jan | Feb | Mar | Apr | May | Jun | Jul | Aug | Sep | Oct | Nov | Dec | Year |
|---|---|---|---|---|---|---|---|---|---|---|---|---|---|
| Record high °C (°F) | 20.6 (69.1) | 23.0 (73.4) | 22.2 (72.0) | 30.0 (86.0) | 33.3 (91.9) | 35.0 (95.0) | 37.2 (99.0) | 35.6 (96.1) | 33.9 (93.0) | 31.7 (89.1) | 24.4 (75.9) | 20.0 (68.0) | 37.2 (99.0) |
| Mean daily maximum °C (°F) | −0.1 (31.8) | 1.6 (34.9) | 4.8 (40.6) | 10.9 (51.6) | 15.8 (60.4) | 19.3 (66.7) | 23.0 (73.4) | 23.1 (73.6) | 17.7 (63.9) | 11.9 (53.4) | 4.4 (39.9) | -0 (32) | 11.0 (51.8) |
| Daily mean °C (°F) | −6.5 (20.3) | −4.9 (23.2) | −1.7 (28.9) | 4.1 (39.4) | 8.8 (47.8) | 12.5 (54.5) | 15.3 (59.5) | 15.0 (59.0) | 10.2 (50.4) | 5.1 (41.2) | −1.6 (29.1) | −6.2 (20.8) | 4.2 (39.6) |
| Mean daily minimum °C (°F) | −12.9 (8.8) | −11.3 (11.7) | −8.1 (17.4) | −2.8 (27.0) | 1.7 (35.1) | 5.7 (42.3) | 7.6 (45.7) | 7.0 (44.6) | 2.7 (36.9) | −1.7 (28.9) | −7.6 (18.3) | −12.3 (9.9) | −2.7 (27.1) |
| Record low °C (°F) | −45 (−49) | −43.3 (−45.9) | −40.6 (−41.1) | −30 (−22) | −19.4 (−2.9) | −4.4 (24.1) | −3.9 (25.0) | −16.7 (1.9) | −16.1 (3.0) | −29.4 (−20.9) | −37 (−35) | −45 (−49) | −45 (−49) |
| Average precipitation mm (inches) | 20.4 (0.80) | 19.2 (0.76) | 33.0 (1.30) | 38.7 (1.52) | 72.8 (2.87) | 111.0 (4.37) | 60.2 (2.37) | 59.6 (2.35) | 55.0 (2.17) | 24.8 (0.98) | 26.5 (1.04) | 27.1 (1.07) | 538.6 (21.20) |
| Average rainfall mm (inches) | 0.2 (0.01) | 0.0 (0.0) | 2.1 (0.08) | 12.1 (0.48) | 58.1 (2.29) | 110.9 (4.37) | 60.2 (2.37) | 59.6 (2.35) | 49.7 (1.96) | 9.5 (0.37) | 1.2 (0.05) | 0.1 (0.00) | 363.7 (14.32) |
| Average snowfall cm (inches) | 20.0 (7.9) | 19.0 (7.5) | 31.0 (12.2) | 27.0 (10.6) | 15.0 (5.9) | 0.0 (0.0) | 0.0 (0.0) | 0.0 (0.0) | 5.0 (2.0) | 15.0 (5.9) | 25.0 (9.8) | 17.0 (6.7) | 175.0 (68.9) |
Source: Environment Canada

== Demographics ==
Federal census population history
| Year | Pop. | ±% |
|---|---|---|
| 1901 | 153 | — |
| 1906 | 1,018 | +565.4% |
| 1911 | 1,182 | +16.1% |
| 1916 | 1,182 | +0.0% |
| 1921 | 1,198 | +1.4% |
| 1926 | 1,377 | +14.9% |
| 1931 | 1,459 | +6.0% |
| 1936 | 1,359 | −6.9% |
| 1941 | 1,430 | +5.2% |
| 1946 | 1,674 | +17.1% |
| 1951 | 1,888 | +12.8% |
| 1956 | 2,102 | +11.3% |
| 1961 | 2,276 | +8.3% |
| 1966 | 2,239 | −1.6% |
| 1971 | 2,676 | +19.5% |
| 1976 | 3,598 | +34.5% |
| 1981 | 4,792 | +33.2% |
| 1986 | 5,096 | +6.3% |
| 1991 | 6,269 | +23.0% |
| 1996 | 7,359 | +17.4% |
| 2001 | 9,345 | +27.0% |
| 2006 | 10,716 | +14.7% |
| 2011 | 12,920 | +20.6% |
| 2016 | 13,584 | +5.1% |
| 2021 | 14,324 | +5.4% |
Source: Statistics Canada

In the 2021 Census of Population conducted by Statistics Canada, the Town of High River had a population of 14,324 living in 5,787 of its 5,950 total private dwellings, a change of 5.4% from its 2016 population of 13,594. With a land area of 22.19 km^{2} (8.57 sq mi), it had a population density of 645.5/km^{2} (1,671.9/sq mi) in 2021.

The population of the Town of High River according to its 2019 municipal census is 14,052, a 19.3% change from its 2010 municipal census population of 11,783.

In the 2016 Census of Population conducted by Statistics Canada, the Town of High River recorded a population of 13,584 living in 5,367 of its 5,655 total private dwellings, a 5.1% change from its 2011 population of 12,930. With a land area of 21.39 km^{2} (8.26 sq mi), it had a population density of 635.1/km^{2} (1,644.8/sq mi) in 2016.

Panethnic groups in the Town of High River (2001−2021)
| Panethnic group | 2021 | | 2016 | | 2011 | | 2006 | | 2001 | |
| Panethnic group | Pop. | % | Pop. | % | Pop. | % | Pop. | % | Pop. | % |
|---|---|---|---|---|---|---|---|---|---|---|
| European (Note: Statistic includes all persons that did not make up part of a visible minority or an indigenous identity.) | 11,165 | 79.13% | 11,205 | 84.09% | 11,315 | 88.95% | 9,695 | 91.25% | 8,640 | 94.02% |
| Southeast Asian (Note: Statistic includes total responses of "Filipino" and "Southeast Asian" under visible minority section on census.) | 1,580 | 11.2% | 945 | 7.09% | 410 | 3.22% | 105 | 0.99% | 85 | 0.92% |
| Indigenous | 470 | 3.33% | 505 | 3.79% | 540 | 4.25% | 295 | 2.78% | 200 | 2.18% |
| Latin American | 280 | 1.98% | 155 | 1.16% | 160 | 1.26% | 85 | 0.8% | 25 | 0.27% |
| African | 225 | 1.59% | 140 | 1.05% | 55 | 0.43% | 80 | 0.75% | 20 | 0.22% |
| South Asian | 170 | 1.2% | 140 | 1.05% | 120 | 0.94% | 45 | 0.42% | 20 | 0.22% |
| Middle Eastern (Note: Statistic includes total responses of "West Asian" and "Arab" under visible minority section on census.) | 115 | 0.82% | 105 | 0.79% | 0 | 0% | 180 | 1.69% | 95 | 1.03% |
| East Asian (Note: Statistic includes total responses of "Chinese", "Korean", and "Japanese" under visible minority section on census.) | 60 | 0.43% | 75 | 0.56% | 50 | 0.39% | 120 | 1.13% | 100 | 1.09% |
| Other/multiracial (Note: Statistic includes total responses of "Visible minority, n.i.e." and "Multiple visible minorities" under visible minority section on census.) | 65 | 0.46% | 65 | 0.49% | 65 | 0.51% | 50 | 0.47% | 0 | 0% |
| Total responses | 14,110 | 98.51% | 13,325 | 98.02% | 12,720 | 98.38% | 10,625 | 99.15% | 9,190 | 97.94% |
| Total population | 14,324 | 100% | 13,594 | 100% | 12,930 | 100% | 10,716 | 100% | 9,383 | 100% |
Note: Totals greater than 100% due to multiple origin responses

== Arts and culture ==
As part of High River's tourism and heritage endeavours, a number of murals illustrating High River's history were painted around town. The first of which were painted in the 1990s, and the most recent one being completed in 2016.

== Attractions ==
The Museum of the Highwood (c. 1911–12), which sustained smoke, water and fire damage following a fire in the building's attic in July 2010, is on the Canadian Register of Historic Places.

== Education ==
High River is part of the Foothills School Division No. 38, as well as the Christ The Redeemer Catholic Schools Division.

Foothills School Division:

- École Joe Clark School – Grades K-5
- Spitzee Elementary School – Grades K-5
- École Senator Riley Middle School – Grades 6–8
- École Secondaire Highwood High School – Grades 9–12

Christ The Redeemer Catholic Schools:

- Holy Spirit Academy – Grades K-6
- Notre Dame Collegiate – Grades 7–12

== Media ==
- CHRB AM 1140, community radio
- CFXO-FM 99.7, country music
- CKUV-FM 100.9, classic hits
- High River Times

== Notable people ==
- Evan Berger, Member of the Legislative Assembly of Alberta, 2008 - 2012
- George Canyon, country music singer
- Joe Clark, former Canadian Prime Minister
- John "Pie" McKenzie, former professional hockey player
- W. O. Mitchell, author
- Glen Sather, former hockey player/head coach
- Danielle Smith, Premier of Alberta

== Film and television ==
High River has been used as a filming location for the following films and television series:

- Superman III (1983)
- Caitlin's Way (2000–2002)
- Heartland (2007–present)
- Fargo (2014–present)
- Tin Star (2017–2020)
- Black Summer (2019–2021)
- The Last of Us (2023–present)

== See also ==
- List of communities in Alberta
- List of towns in Alberta
- Foothills Regional Airport
- RCAF Station High River
- Frank Lake
