= CKRY-FM =

Radio station in Calgary

- Calgary, Alberta; Canada
- Broadcast area: Calgary Metropolitan Region
- Frequency: 105.1 MHz (HD Radio)
- Branding: Country 105

Programming
- Format: Country
- Subchannels: HD2: CHQR simulcast News/talk/sports
- Affiliations: Premiere Networks

Ownership
- Owner: Corus Entertainment; (Corus Radio Company)
- Sister stations: CHQR, CFGQ-FM, CICT-DT, CISA-DT

History
- First air date: July 9, 1982
- Call sign meaning: Either "Calgary" or "country"

Technical information
- Class: C
- ERP: 100,000 watts
- HAAT: 298.5 metres (979 ft)
- Transmitter coordinates: 51.050°N 114.075°W
- Repeater: CKRY-FM-2 93.3 Banff

Links
- Website: country105.com

CKRY-FM is a Canadian radio station that broadcasts a country format at 105.1 FM in Calgary, Alberta. The station uses its on-air brand name Country 105. The station is owned by Corus Entertainment, which also owns sister stations CHQR, CFGQ-FM, CICT-DT, and CISA-DT. CKRY's studios are located on 17th Ave SW near Westbrook Mall, while its transmitter is located at 85th Street Southwest and Old Banff Coach Road in western Calgary.

As of Winter 2020, CKRY is the 5th-most-listened-to radio station in the Calgary market according to a PPM data report released by Numeris. Country 105 has been awarded Station of the Year several times, most recently in 2019.

Country 105 logo prior to 2013

A transmitter located in Banff, Alberta, rebroadcasts the station at 93.3 FM.

In December 2015, CKRY launched HD Radio services, becoming the first station in Alberta to do so. Their HD2 sub-channel airs a simulcast of sister station CHQR. On April 1. 2016, Corus acquired Shaw Media, giving CKRY two TV stations (CISA and CICT) for additional sister networks. CKRY is simulcast across Canada on Bell Satellite TV satellite channel 968.
