= CHQR =

Radio station in Calgary

- Calgary, Alberta; Canada
- Broadcast area: Calgary Metropolitan Region; Southern Alberta
- Frequency: 770 kHz
- Branding: QR Calgary

Programming
- Format: News/talk/sports
- Affiliations: Global News; Calgary Stampeders; Calgary Flames

Ownership
- Owner: Corus Entertainment; (CKIK-FM Ltd.)
- Sister stations: CFGQ-FM, CKRY-FM, CICT-DT, CISA-DT

History
- First air date: August 15, 1964
- Former frequencies: 810 kHz (1964–1986)
- Call sign meaning: "Calgary's Highest Quality Radio"

Technical information
- Licensing authority: CRTC
- Class: B
- Power: 50,000 watts
- Transmitter coordinates: 50.8211°N 114.052°W
- Repeater: 105.1 CKRY-FM HD2 (Calgary)

Links
- Website: globalnews.ca/radio/qrcalgary/

CHQR is a radio station owned by Corus Entertainment operating in Calgary, Alberta, Canada. Broadcasting at AM 770, it airs news/talk and sports programming. With the exception of one show, all of CHQR's weekday programming is produced in-house. CHQR is also the exclusive radio voice of the Calgary Stampeders and Calgary Flames. CHQR is also the last AM station in the Calgary market to broadcast in C-QUAM AM stereo. CHQR is a Class B station on the clear-channel frequency of 770 kHz.

CHQR's studios are located on 17th Avenue Southwest in Calgary, while its transmitters are located just south of the Calgary city limits near De Winton.

As of Winter 2021, CHQR is the most-listened-to radio station in the Calgary market according to a PPM data report released by Numeris.

== History ==
Logo used from 2021-2023

The station originally began broadcasting at 810 AM in 1964, and received approval to move to its current frequency on June 26, 1986.

On November 9, 2011, Corus Entertainment applied to the Canadian Radio-television and Telecommunications Commission (CRTC) to add an FM transmitter to serve Calgary on the frequency 106.9 MHz to rebroadcast the programming of CHQR 770. This application was denied on May 24, 2012.

In December 2015, CHQR was added to sister station CKRY-FM's HD2 sub-channel when they activated HD Radio services, becoming the first station in Alberta to do so.

Logo during the simulcast with CFGQ-FM, 2023-2024

On January 9, 2023, CHQR rebranded as QR Calgary and added an FM simulcast on CFGQ-FM. That spring, following inquiries by the CRTC regarding whether the simulcast complies with broadcasting regulations, Corus filed a set of applications with the CRTC to formalize the simulcast by re-designating CFGQ as the originating station of the news/talk format under a specialty FM licence, revoking CHQR's AM licence, and repurposing the current 770 AM facility as a rebroadcaster of CFGQ. In doing so, Corus questioned the format's continued viability on AM in Calgary, reiterating the arguments it had made during its 2011 rebroadcaster application while also referencing increased interference, and automakers removing AM radio from electric vehicles due to electrical interference issues.

Corus withdrew the application in June 2024, and announced that it would end the simulcast by the end of July 2024 in favour of returning to a music format on 107.3 FM. A Corus spokesperson stated that the simulcast was not economically successful "the way we had hoped". CFGQ broke from the simulcast in late-July, and relaunched as classic alternative The Edge on July 31.

== Programming ==
On August 12, 2026, the Calgary Flames announced that they had reached a five-year deal to move their radio broadcasts to CHQR beginning in the 2026–27 NHL season. Their long-time home of CFAC had closed on July 7, 2026 as part of cuts by owner Rogers Radio.
