= Pierre Coupey =

Canadian painter, poet, and editor

- Born: 1942; Montreal, Quebec
- Known for: painter, poet, and editor

Pierre Coupey RCA (born 1942) is a Canadian painter, poet, and editor.

== Career ==
Pierre Coupey was born and raised in Montreal, Quebec. He graduated from Lower Canada College, received his BA from McGill University, studied drawing at the Académie Julian and studied printmaking at the Atelier 17 in Paris. He received his MA in English and Creative Writing from the University of British Columbia and a Certificate in Printmaking from the Art Institute, Capilano University.

He was a founding co-editor of The Georgia Straight and the founding editor of The Capilano Review. He currently serves on The Capilano Review Contemporary Arts Society Board. His work has received awards such as the Vancouver 2013 Distinguished Artist Award from FANS (Fund for the Arts on the North Shore). Coupey has been given grants by the Conseil des Arts du Québec, the Canada Council, the British Columbia Arts Council, and the Audain Foundation for the Arts, among others. In 2017, he was elected to the Royal Canadian Academy of Arts (RCA) and he was formally inducted in 2018.

He has published several books of poetry, chapbooks. and catalogs, and exhibited in solo and group shows nationally and internationally. His work is represented in private collections in Canada, the United States, Japan, and Europe as well as numerous corporate, university and public collections across Canada. Major public collections include the Burnaby Art Gallery, the Canada Council Art Bank, the Kelowna Art Gallery, Simon Fraser University Art Gallery, University of Guelph Collection, the University of Lethbridge Art Gallery, the Vancouver Art Gallery and the West Vancouver Art Museum.

He recently completed major painting commissions for two new buildings, 745 Thurlow in Vancouver and Fifteen 15 in Calgary.

A Coupey poem, "Study No. X" has been included in GCSE syllabuses in English schools.

In 2019, Capilano University recognized Coupey with the honour of Faculty Emeritus for his outstanding service as a Capilano University instructor, writer and artist, and for his continuing contribution to the arts.

== Exhibitions ==
=== Solo (recent) ===
- 2017 New Work, Odon Wagner Contemporary, Toronto [Catalogue]
- 2016 Recent Work: RaptureRupture, Gallery Jones, Vancouver
- 2016 Requiem Notations I-IX, curator Darrin Morrison, West Vancouver Museum at West Vancouver Library
- 2014 Measures: Recent Work, Odon Wagner Contemporary, Toronto [Catalogue]
- 2013 Cutting Out the Tongue: Selected Work 1976-2012, curators Astrid Heyerdahl / Darrin Morrison, Art Gallery at Evergreen, West Vancouver Museum [Catalogue]

=== Group ===
- 2017 Art Toronto 2017, Toronto International Art Fair, Odon Wagner Contemporary, Toronto [Catalogue]
- 2017 Vivid Dimensions: Group Show, Odon Wagner Contemporary, Toronto
- 2017 Canada 150: Celebrating Our Artists, Odon Wagner Contemporary, Toronto
- 2017 The Big Picture, curator Liz Wylie, Kelowna Art Gallery [Catalogue]
- 2017 Art Palm Beach 2017, Odon Wagner Contemporary, Palm Beach, Florida
- 2016 Art Toronto 2016, Toronto International Art Fair, Odon Wagner Contemporary, Toronto [Catalogue]
- 2016 Summer Show: Gallery Artists, Gallery Jones, Vancouver

== Awards | Grants | Commissions ==
- 2017 RCA elect, Royal Canadian Academy of Arts
- 2016 Painting Commission, Fifteen 15, Calgary
- 2015 Painting Commission, 745 Thurlow, Vancouver
- 2013 Distinguished Artist Award (Visual & Literary Arts), FANS, North Vancouver
- 2013 Exhibitions Grant, Audain Foundation for the Arts, Vancouver

== Books | Catalogues ==
- Bring Forth the Cowards. Montreal: McGill Poetry Series, 1964.
- Circle Without Center. Vancouver: Talonbooks/Very Stone House, 1968.
- Four Island Poems. Prince George: Caledonia Writing Series, 1975.
- Terminal Series. Prince George: Caledonia Writing Series, 1973.
- Counterpoint: Recent Work. Catalogue. Vancouver: Gallery Jones, 2008.
- Cutting Out the Tongue: Selected Work 1976-2012. Catalogue. West Vancouver/Coquitlam: West Vancouver
- Museum/Art Gallery at Evergreen Cultural Centre, 2013.
- Measures: Recent Work. Catalogue. Toronto: Odon Wagner Contemporary, 2014.

== Publications Edited ==
- The Capilano Review, founding editor 1971-1976; editor 1989-1991; assistant editor 1987-1989, 2002
- The Georgia Straight, founding co-editor, 1967-1968
- The Western Gate, founding co-editor, 1968

== Anthologies ==
- Actis, Andrea and Dylan Godwin, eds. For Jamie Reid: 1941-2015. (The Capilano Review) ti-TCR: A Web Folio 13 (Spring 2016).
- Ganter, Brian, ed. The Capilano Review: The Manifesto Issue 3rd ser.13 (Winter 2011).
- Houglum, Brook, ed. The Capilano Review: The George Stanley Issue 3rd ser.14 (Spring 2011).
- The Capilano Review: 40th Anniversary Issue 3rd ser.17 (Spring 2012).
- Revisiting Roy Kiyooka’s Pacific Windows. ti-TCR: A Web Folio 12 (Spring 2015).
- Kernaghan, Patti and Jenny Penberthy, eds. One More Once: for Pierre Coupey's 70th. North Vancouver: CUE, 2012.
- Mahood, Aurelea, ed. Everything Is Deep Enough: Pierre Coupey at 70. ti-TCR: A Web Folio 5 (Fall 2012).
- Nield, John, Graham Fletcher and Unsah Tabassum. AQA GCSE English: Skills for Language & Literature, Teacher Guide + CD. Deddington, England: Philip Allan, 2010.
- Reid, Carol, ed. Can You Hear Me Now: A Tribute to Jamie Reid. North Vancouver: Blue Window, 2011.
- Schermbrucker, Bill and Crawford Kilian, eds. The Dialogue Continues Tales from the Making of Capilano College. North Vancouver: Capilano Faculty Association, 2014.

== Covers | Broadsides | On-Line ==
- "The Big, Bad World of Public Readings." TCR Blog (Fall 2012).
- A Book of Days I (Lorca). Cover. Jack Hannan, Rhythm to Stand Beside. Toronto: Cormorant, 2013.
- "The Alphabet of Blood." Visual Writing: Documents in Concrete & Visual Poetry: Ubu Editions, 2011.
- Field IV (detail). Cover. One More Once: for Pierre Coupey's 70th. North Vancouver: CUE, 2012.
- "The Night We Hijacked Leonard Cohen, with digressions." TCR Blog (Fall 2012).
- Notations 20: As If. Cover. Daniel Karasik, Hungry. Toronto: Cormorant, 2013.
- Notations 25. Cover. Marilyn Gear Pilling, A Bee Garden. Toronto: Cormorant, 2013.
- Notations 28. Cover. Amanda Jernigan, All the Daylight Hours. Toronto: Cormorant, 2013.
- "On Editing the Pacific Windows Issue." ti-TCR: A Web Folio 12 (Spring 2015).
