= CISA-DT =

Television station in Lethbridge

- Lethbridge, Alberta; Canada
- Channels: Digital: 7 (VHF); Virtual: 7
- Branding: Global Lethbridge

Programming
- Affiliations: Global

Ownership
- Owner: Corus Entertainment; (Corus Television Limited Partnership)
- Sister stations: CICT-DT

History
- First air date: November 20, 1955
- Former call signs: CJLH-TV (1955–1972); CJOC-TV (1972–1976); CFAC-TV-7 (1977–1990); CISA-TV (1990–2011)
- Former channel numbers: Analogue: 7 (VHF, 1955–2011)
- Former affiliations: CBC (1955–1975); Independent (1975–2001); Global (secondary, 1988–2000)
- Call sign meaning: Canadian Independent Southern Alberta

Technical information
- Licensing authority: CRTC
- ERP: 19.7 kW
- HAAT: 201.4 m (661 ft)
- Transmitter coordinates: 49°46′47″N 112°52′18″W
- Translator(s): see § Transmitters

Links
- Website: Global Lethbridge

CISA-DT (channel 7, cable channel 2) is a television station in Lethbridge, Alberta, Canada, owned and operated by the Global Television Network, a division of Corus Entertainment. The station maintains studios inside the Royal Bank building at the corner of 7 Street South and 4 Avenue South in downtown Lethbridge, and its transmitter is located near Highway 25 and Range Road 221, just outside the city.

The station carries the full Global network schedule, and its programming is similar to sister stations CICT-DT in Calgary and CITV-DT in Edmonton. It is the smallest station in the Global network (formerly second to the defunct Shaw-owned affiliate CJBN-TV in Kenora, Ontario) and is the only standalone commercial station in Southern Alberta.

== History ==
=== As CJLH-TV ===
The station first signed on the air on November 20, 1955, as CJLH-TV, broadcasting on VHF channel 7 from a 167,000-watt transmitter atop a 638-foot (194 m) tower located at what was the city limits of Lethbridge. The station was a joint venture between local radio station CJOC (the "CJ" in the call sign) and the Lethbridge Herald (the "LH"). It was managed by CJOC's owners, Taylor Pearson & Carson, and began life as an affiliate of the Canadian Broadcasting Corporation's (CBC) television network. Network programs on kinescope arrived within a few days to a week after they went to air live in Toronto, Montreal, Vancouver, or the U.S. networks. Three months after CJLH went to air, measurement services showed that the station had a potential audience of 9,400 homes, but within a year, that grew to 19,200, and of those, 16,000 had bought television sets. At the time, CJLH was the only station in the Lethbridge area.

Local programming at the time included local newscasts; Channel 7 Spotlight, showcasing area talent; Remember When, a series of programs hosted by Harry Baalim using slides, pictures and relics to tell the history of Southern Alberta; and Home Gardener, featuring many experts in the field demonstrating proper horticultural technique. These programs (along with several others) earned the station many awards, including seven awards from Liberty magazine in the 1950s and 1960s.

In 1958, the timeshifting problems the station had with network programming were eliminated when it was able to get a direct microwave link to the CBC network via its Calgary time-delay centre. The problem still existed for live sports events, such as NHL hockey and CFL football telecasts. In 1961, CJLH expanded into the Crowsnest Pass area, by opening a repeater station at Burmis on channel 3. An application from CFCN-TV in Calgary to open a repeater station in Lethbridge was unsuccessful in getting CRTC approval that year.

However, a few years later in 1968, an agreement was reached between CFCN and CJLH to share space on the CJLH tower and building for technical equipment. On September 3, CFCN went on the air with a repeater station on channel 13. That same year, the station's first 2-inch black and white videotape recorder was installed, and a repeater in Brooks began operations, transmitting at low power on VHF channel 3.

=== As CJOC-TV ===
In 1970, program production was increased significantly when CJLH became a two-camera operation. Two years later, the Herald sold its stake in the station to Selkirk Communications (as Taylor Pearson & Carson had been renamed in 1959), who changed its call sign to CJOC-TV to match the radio station. It became a semi-satellite of co-owned CFAC-TV in Calgary (now CICT-DT) and continued local production with shows such as Time Out, Ski Reports, Our Town, Sunday Hour, Thought for the Day, Focus on University, College Campus and numerous specials. In 1974, CJOC went full colour with two colour cameras and three colour 1" VTRs. CFCN moved out of the CJOC building and into its own during that same year.

=== As CFAC-TV-7 ===
On September 1, 1975, CFAC-TV disaffiliated from the CBC and became an independent station when CBC Television put its own station, CBRT (channel 9), on the air. On the same day, CJOC also disaffiliated from the CBC as CBRT had set up a rebroadcaster in Lethbridge. In 1976, it changed its callsign to CFAC-TV-7. Despite its rebroadcaster-like callsign, it was still licensed as a full-fledged station. The station took on the same branding as CFAC-TV in Calgary, adopting the moniker "2&7 Lethbridge Television". In 1979, the station increased its transmitter power to 167,000 watts. In 1988, it added a satellite dish to get video news feeds from Global Television, and also began carrying some of Global's entertainment programming along with its Calgary sister.

Local programming continued to play an important role at the station, with successful shows such as Ski West, which was syndicated to CHCH-TV in Hamilton, BCTV in Vancouver and CFCF-TV in Montreal, and was also judged best syndicated show in the country at the time; We Won't Let Him Die, which won the CanPro Founders award in 1983; and Kids Belong Together (1990) and Key to Literacy (1992), both shows won the Canadian Association of Broadcasters Gold Ribbon Award for community involvement.

=== As CISA-TV ===
CISA-TV's last independent logo, before gaining the Global affiliation

In 1989, Selkirk Communications merged with CFCN's then-owner, Maclean Hunter, who immediately sold most of Selkirk's television holdings, including CFAC-TV-7, to Western International Communications. One year later, WIC changed the station's calls to CISA-TV. Through the years, CISA's commitment to local programming has continued to reap both industry awards, making it one of the country's most awarded stations, and audience numbers in its local area.

CISA-TV's first Global logo, used from 2000 to 2006

In 1998, the Griffiths family sold WIC's assets to Shaw Communications and Canwest. In 1999, agreements were lodged with the CRTC to split WIC assets between Canwest, Corus Radio and Shaw. The CRTC approved the purchase in 2000; Western International Communications was sold to Canwest, and CISA-TV became a full-time Global Television Network station under the brand "Global Lethbridge" on September 4 that year. CISA was the last Global station to have its website integrated into the canada.com network.

== Programming ==
Since 1970, CISA's non-news schedule has been identical to that of CICT. Both stations air Global programming on the same schedule as CITV in Edmonton.

=== News operation ===
CISA-DT presently broadcasts 7 1/2 hours of locally produced newscasts during the week; in regards to the number of hours devoted to news programming, it is the lowest local newscast output out of Global's news-producing owned-and-operated stations. On September 10, 2008, news production for CISA shifted from Lethbridge to Calgary, with the addition of a new virtual set. In 2015, a new local news production model was launched at CISA, eliminating locally produced weekend newscasts.

==== Notable former on-air staff ====
- Jackson Proskow

== Technical information ==
=== Subchannel ===
Subchannel of CISA-DT
Channel	Res.	Short name	Programming
7.1	1080i	CISA-DT	Global

=== Analog-to-digital conversion ===
On July 27, 2011, one month before Canadian television stations in CRTC-designated mandatory markets transitioned from analogue to digital broadcasts, the station shut down its Lethbridge analog transmitter and flash cut to digital, becoming the first television station in Southern Alberta to convert to digital. The station's digital signal remained on VHF channel 7.

=== Transmitters ===
The following translators will continue to offer the analog signal after CISA's main Lethbridge transmitter is converted to digital.

==== Alberta translators ====
Station	City of licence	Channel	ERP	HAAT	Transmitter coordinates
CISA-TV-1	Burmis	3 (VHF) (to move to 9 (VHF))	0.409 kW	128 m	49°31′54″N 114°11′41″W
CISA-TV-2	Brooks	3 (VHF)	0.01 kW	NA	50°32′3″N 111°55′0″W
CISA-TV-3	Coleman	12 (VHF)	0.01 kW	NA	49°34′39″N 114°30′6″W
CISA-TV-4	Waterton Park	12 (VHF)	0.001 kW	NA	49°3′32″N 113°54′23″W
CISA-TV-5	Pincher Creek	9 (VHF)	0.001 kW	NA	49°28′48″N 113°58′1″W

==== Montana translator ====
CISA-DT has one translator in Montana, which is operated by a local TV association.

Station	City of license	Licensee	Channel	ERP	HAAT	Facility ID	Transmitter coordinates	Public license information
K36DK-D	Joplin, MT	East Butte TV Club, Inc.	36 (UHF)	0.41 kW	851.5 m (2,794 ft)	18192	48°51′16.5″N 111°8′32.3″W	LMS
