= CHUP-FM =

Radio station in Calgary

- Calgary, Alberta; Canada
- Broadcast area: Calgary Metropolitan Region
- Frequency: 97.7 MHz
- Branding: C97.7

Programming
- Format: Hot adult contemporary

Ownership
- Owner: Stingray Radio
- Sister stations: CKMP-FM, CFXL-FM

History
- First air date: March 6, 2008
- Former call signs: CIGY-FM (2008–2011)
- Call sign meaning: "Up" (former branding)

Technical information
- Licensing authority: CRTC
- Class: C1
- ERP: 100,000 watts
- HAAT: 298.6 metres (980 ft)
- Transmitter coordinates: 51.065°N 114.213°W

Links
- Website: c977.ca

CHUP-FM (97.7 FM, "C97.7") is a radio station in Calgary, Alberta, Canada. Owned by Stingray Radio, it broadcasts a hot adult contemporary format. CHUP's studios are located on Railway Street Southeast in Calgary, while its transmitter is located at 85 Street Southwest and Old Banff Coach Road in western Calgary.

As of Summer 2023, CHUP is the #1 most-listened-to radio station in the Calgary market with Adults 35–54, according to a PPM data report released by Numeris.

== History ==
In August 2006, Rawlco Communications received CRTC approval for a new FM radio station on 100.3 FM in Calgary; it proposed a station carrying a specialty format devoted to acoustic and folk music. In August 2007, the CRTC approved a request by Rawlco to relocate the station to 97.7 FM, concurrent with a request by CAB-K Broadcasting to move its station CKLJ-FM in Olds, Alberta from 97.7 to 96.5 FM—allowing them to increase their effective radiated power to 100,000 and 35,000 watts respectively.

The station officially launched on March 6, 2008, at 10:00 a.m. as 97.7 Calgary FM, CIGY-FM. It originally broadcast a hybrid hot adult contemporary/country format; the station's programming director Doug Pringle explained that the format was tailored towards local preferences for melodic, guitar-based music, since there was no single station that played "all [the] sorts of music that qualified".

In September 2008, the station rebranded as The New 97.7 FM with no change in format, and then Mix 97.7 the following August. In April 2010, CIGY dropped the country lean and segued to a modern adult contemporary format.

On May 20, 2011, the station flipped to adult hits as Up! 97.7, modeled after Edmonton sister station CIUP-FM. The station changed its call letters to CHUP-FM to match the new branding.

In 2013, the CRTC relieved CHUP of broadcasting a specialty music format.

On September 4, 2015, CHUP flipped to mainstream adult contemporary, branded as Soft Rock 97.7, returning the format to the market after Rogers' flip of CHFM to adult top 40.

On October 13, 2021, the station rebranded as C97.7, a hot AC-leaning format focusing on music from the 1990s through the present.

On November 26, 2025, Rawlco announced that it would sell the station to Stingray Radio, making it a sister to CFXL-FM and CKMP-FM, and ending Rawlco's broadcast presence in Alberta. The sale was approved by the CRTC on June 18, 2026. On July 27, 2026, Stingray took ownership of CHUP, the company stated that there would be no major changes to CHUP’s programming.
