= CFXO-FM =

Radio station in High River, Alberta, Canada

Coordinates: 50.578°N 113.870°W

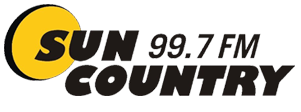
- High River, Alberta; Canada
- Broadcast area: Southern parts of Calgary Region; Foothills Region
- Frequency: 99.7 MHz
- Branding: 99.7 Sun Country

Programming
- Language: English
- Format: Country

Ownership
- Owner: Golden West Broadcasting
- Sister stations: CHRB, CKUV-FM

History
- First air date: October 30, 2007

Technical information
- Class: B
- ERP: 6.9 kW vertical 16 kW horizontal
- HAAT: 140.1 metres (460 ft)

Links
- Webcast: Listen Live
- Website: highriveronline.com

CFXO-FM is a Canadian radio station that broadcasts a country format at 99.7 FM in High River, Alberta. The station is branded as 99.7 Sun Country and is owned by Golden West Broadcasting.

The station began broadcasting on October 30, 2007.

In November 2026, Golden West announced that it would swap CFXO and Strathmore station CKMR-FM to Pattison Media in exchange for three Pattison stations in Red Deer and Rocky Mountain House.
