= CFGQ-FM =

Radio station in Calgary

- Calgary, Alberta; Canada
- Broadcast area: Calgary Metropolitan Area; Banff
- Frequencies: 107.3 MHz (CFGQ-FM); 100.1 MHz (CFGQ-FM-2)
- Branding: 107.3 The Edge

Programming
- Format: Classic alternative
- Affiliations: Calgary Stampeders

Ownership
- Owner: Corus Entertainment; (CKIK-FM Ltd.)
- Sister stations: CHQR, CKRY-FM

History
- First air date: April 15, 1982
- Former call signs: CKIK-FM (1982–2004)

Technical information
- Class: C
- ERP: 100,000 watts
- HAAT: 298.5 metres (979 ft)
- Transmitter coordinates: 51.050°N 114.075°W

Links
- Webcast: Listen Live
- Website: 1073edge.com

CFGQ-FM (107.3 FM, "107.3 The Edge") is a radio station in Calgary, Alberta, Canada. Owned by Corus Entertainment, it broadcasts a classic alternative format. CFGQ broadcasts from the Bet MGM Studio located on 17th Ave SW near Westbrook Mall, while its transmitter is located at 85th Street Southwest and Old Banff Coach Road in western Calgary.

As of Winter 2020, CFGQ was the 7th-most-listened-to radio station in the Calgary market according to a PPM data report released by Numeris.

== History ==
The station was launched on April 15, 1982, as CKIK-FM, and first broadcast an adult album rock format. Throughout the 1980s and much of the 1990s, CKIK (known on-air as 107 KIK FM and later as Rock 107) played a variety of rock formats. Early in its history, the station encountered financial difficulties, which were alleviated in 1985, when Harvey Glatt, Ottawa music impresario and founder of CHEZ-FM, acquired a 75% interest in the station, which he held until 1995.

Logo as "Q107" used until 2023

On September 26, 1997, CKIK flipped to contemporary hit radio as Power 107. On January 25, 2002, it flipped to hot adult contemporary as The Peak 107.3. On February 19, 2004, at 1:07 p.m., the station flipped to classic rock as Q107, after which it adopted its current call letters.

In 2007, Terry DiMonte, formerly associated with CHOM-FM in Montreal, joined CFGQ as its morning host. In December 2011, Terry DiMonte left CFGQ, returning to CHOM in Montreal. In August 2019, the station replaced its morning show with Willy in the Morning from sister station CFMI-FM.

=== CHQR simulcast ===
Logo as "QR Calgary" used from 2023-2024

On December 16, 2022, it was reported that CFGQ would launch a new format on January 9, 2023, with CFGQ's remaining local personalities (including afternoon hosts "Tarzan Dan" Freeman and Cam Sullivan) announcing the end of their respective shows. On the announced date, the station became an FM simulcast of AM news/talk station CHQR, with both stations collectively rebranded as "QR Calgary".

In May 2023, following inquiries by the Canadian Radio-television and Telecommunications Commission (CRTC) regarding whether the simulcast complies with broadcasting regulations, Corus filed a set of applications with the CRTC to formalize the simulcast by re-designating CFGQ as the originating station of the news/talk format under a specialty FM licence, revoking CHQR's AM licence, and formally designating the current CHQR facility as an AM rebroadcaster of CFGQ.

=== The Edge ===
In June 2024, before the CRTC began any action on Corus' application, the company abruptly rescinded the application and announced that it would abandon the CHQR simulcast on CFGQ instead. A Corus spokesperson stated that the choice was made because the company was "not able to monetize QR on both AM and FM the way we had hoped". Corus then confirmed that CFGQ would return to a music-based format by the end of July. Later that month, RadioInsight reported that Corus had purchased the domain name "1073Edge.com", implicating the possibility of a modern rock format modeled after Toronto sister station CFNY-FM 102.1 The Edge.

On July 31, 2024, at 7 a.m., CFGQ flipped to a classic alternative format as 107.3 The Edge. The new format focuses primarily on alternative rock, grunge, and new wave music from the 1980s, 1990s, and 2000s (marketed by the station as "iconic alternative"). The station will also air Alan Cross's The Ongoing History of New Music, and continue to carry Calgary Stampeders CFL games. The station competes primarily with Harvard Media's modern rock CFEX-FM, and to an extent with Bell Media's active rock CJAY-FM.

In February 2025, Corus announced Justin "Drex" Wilcomes as CFGQ's new morning host.

== Rebroadcasters ==
CFGQ also has an FM transmitter in Banff (CFGQ-FM-2), which broadcasts at 100.1 MHz with an effective radiated power of 92 watts.
