= CFIT-FM =

Radio station in Airdrie, Alberta, Canada

Coordinates: 51.298°N 113.989°W

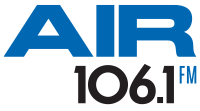
- Airdrie, Alberta; Canada
- Broadcast area: Northern Calgary, Airdrie, Cochrane
- Frequency: 106.1 MHz
- Branding: Air 106

Programming
- Format: Hot adult contemporary

Ownership
- Owner: Golden West Broadcasting

History
- First air date: April 12, 2007

Technical information
- Class: A
- ERP: 3 kWs average 6 kWs peak
- HAAT: 40 metres (130 ft)

Links
- Webcast: Listen Live
- Website: discoverairdrie.com/air-106

CFIT-FM is a Canadian radio station that broadcasts a hot adult contemporary format at 106.1 FM in Airdrie, Alberta. The station is currently owned by Golden West Broadcasting. The station played more pop/rock music other than its rival station, CHFM-FM. The station's launch in 2007 marked the first time Calgary began having two adult contemporary stations on FM.

In 2011, regarding CIGY-FM flipping to adult hits, the station switched formats from a rock-leaning adult contemporary to more of a modern adult contemporary, leaving CHFM-FM as Calgary's only adult contemporary station and regarding the continuity of rock music in its playlist. It was also the largest English-language modern adult contemporary radio station in Canada. Like CKNO-FM in Edmonton, the station mixed in classic hits, and despite not reporting to Mediabase & Nielsen BDS' Canadian hot AC panels, Calgary is the largest market in Canada having two English hot AC stations, with the other station being CKCE-FM.

== History ==
On August 2, 2006, Tiessen Media received approval for an FM licence at Airdrie, with a transmitter at Cochrane. In February 2007, Tiessen Media received approval to operate an FM rebroadcaster at Cochrane on the frequency 95.3 MHz.

On November 25, 2008, Tiessen Media applied to change the frequency of its Cochrane transmitter CFIT-FM-1 to 91.5 MHz. This application received approval on March 9, 2009.

On March 17, 2011, the station applied change the authorized contours by increasing the average effective radiated power (ERP) from 3,000 to 60,000 watts (maximum ERP from 6,000 to 100,000 watts with an effective height of antenna above average terrain to 40 metres). This application for increasing the ERP was approved by the CRTC on September 8, 2011. In early 2011, the station's ownership change to Golden West Broadcasting was approved by the CRTC.

On December 7, 2011, the Range changed their branding to Air 106.1, and shifted its format to adult top 40 from modern adult contemporary by adding more rhythmic contemporary titles. All the pre-1989 titles were dropped as well as they are now heard by its CKUV-FM sister station.

In 2015, Golden West submitted an application to convert CFIT-FM-1 in Cochrane to a standalone country station on the same frequency, carrying news and information relevant to the community. However, the application was rejected by the CRTC, citing concerns that the station would potentially have to rely on soliciting advertising outside of Cochrane in order to be economically viable in the current conditions, and that it could dilute Calgary-based stations. The CRTC approved a revised application in 2018, and the station relaunched on October 24, 2019, as CKXY-FM.
