= CKUV-FM =

Radio station in Okotoks, Alberta

Coordinates: 50°55′25″N 113°50′02″W

- Okotoks, Alberta; Canada
- Broadcast area: Calgary Region; Foothills Region
- Frequency: 100.9 MHz
- Branding: The Eagle 100.9

Programming
- Format: Hot adult contemporary
- Affiliations: Okotoks Oilers

Ownership
- Owner: Golden West Broadcasting
- Sister stations: CFIT-FM, CFXO-FM

History
- First air date: August 29, 2003
- Former call signs: CFXL-FM (2003–2008)

Technical information
- Class: C1
- ERP: 100,000 watts
- HAAT: 138.2 metres (453 ft)

Links
- Website: theeagle1009.com

CKUV-FM is a Canadian radio station being licensed to Okotoks, Alberta, serving the Foothills region broadcasting at 100.9 FM. The station currently broadcasts a hot adult contemporary format branded as The Eagle 100.9. The station first began broadcasting in 2003. The station is currently owned by Golden West Broadcasting.

The station held the call sign CFXL-FM until June 2008, when it adopted its current call sign. The former CIQX-FM in Calgary took over the "CFXL-FM" call sign a few days later.

The Eagle also operates a local news portal called Okotoks Online and provides local news and coverage for Okotoks and surrounding area.
