= BBC Television =

British television service

- Logo used since 2021
- Type: Division
- Industry: Television
- Founded: 2 November 1936; 90 years ago
- Headquarters: Broadcasting House, London, England; MediaCityUK, Salford, England
- Area served: Worldwide
- Services: Television broadcasting
- Parent: BBC
- Website: bbc.co.uk/iplayer

The "Television Symbol", known informally as the "Bats Wings", was the first BBC Television Service (now BBC One) ident. It was created by Abram Games and was used from 1953 to 1960.

BBC Television is the television service of the BBC. The corporation has operated a public broadcast television service in the United Kingdom, under the terms of a royal charter, since 1 January 1927. It produced television programmes from its own studios from 1932, although the start of its regular service of television broadcasts is dated to 2 November 1936.

The BBC's domestic television channels have no commercial advertising and collectively they accounted for more than 30% of all UK viewing in 2013. The services are funded by a television licence.

As a result of the 2016 Licence Fee settlement, the BBC Television division was split, with in-house television production being separated into a new division called BBC Studios and the remaining parts of television (channels and genre commissioning, BBC Sport and BBC iPlayer) being renamed BBC Content.

== History of BBC Television ==
The BBC operates several television networks, television stations (although there is generally very little distinction between the two terms in the UK), and related programming services in the United Kingdom. As well as being a broadcaster, the corporation also produces a large number of its own outsourcing programmes and thereby ranks as one of the world's largest television production companies.

=== Early years (before 1939) ===
John Logie Baird set up the Baird Television Development Company in 1926; on 30 September 1929, he made the first experimental television broadcast for the BBC from its studio in Long Acre in the Covent Garden area of London via the BBC's London radio transmitter propagating an analog signal. Baird used his electromechanical system with a vertically scanned image of 30 lines, which is just enough resolution for a close-up of one person, and a bandwidth low enough to use existing radio transmitters. The simultaneous transmission of sound and pictures was achieved on 30 March 1930, by using the BBC's new twin transmitter at Brookmans Park. By late 1930, thirty minutes of morning programmes were broadcast from Monday to Friday, and thirty minutes at midnight on Tuesdays and Fridays after BBC radio went off the air. Baird's broadcasts via the BBC continued until June 1932.

The BBC began its own regular television programming from the basement of Broadcasting House, London, on 22 August 1932. The studio moved to larger quarters in 16 Portland Place, London, in February 1934, and continued broadcasting the 30-line images, carried by telephone line to the medium wave transmitter at Brookmans Park, until 11 September 1935, by which time advances in the all-electronic 405-line television system made electromechanical broadcasts and systems obsolete.

Following a series of test transmissions and special broadcasts that began in August 1936, the BBC Television Service officially launched at 3.00pm on 2 November 1936 from a converted wing of Alexandra Palace in London. The opening day's programming started using the Baird System at 10.00 am with "Opening of the B.B.C. television service by Major G. C. Tryon", the Postmaster General of the United Kingdom, followed by the latest British Movietone News newsreel at 10.30. This was then followed up with a 10-minute variety show with Adele Dixon and the African-American duo of Buck and Bubbles, and the BBC Television Orchestra. These programmes were then shown at 3.00pm using the Marconi-E.M.I. System. "Ally Pally" housed two studios; Studio A for the 405-line Marconi E.M.I. system, and Studio B for Baird's 240-line intermediate film system. It also housed several scenery stores, make-up areas, dressing rooms, offices, and the transmitter itself, which then broadcast on the VHF band. BBC television initially used both the Baird and Marconi-E.M.I systems on alternate weeks. The use of both formats made the BBC's service the world's first regular high-definition television service; it broadcast from Monday to Saturday between 10:00 and 15:00, and 17:00 and 22:00. The first programme broadcast – and thus the first ever, on a dedicated TV channel – was "Opening of the BBC Television Service" at 10:00. The first major outside broadcast was the coronation of George VI and Elizabeth in May 1937.

The two systems were to run on a trial basis for six months; early television sets supported both resolutions. However, the Baird system, which used a mechanical camera for filmed programming and Farnsworth image dissector cameras for live programming, proved too cumbersome and visually inferior, and ended with closedown (at 22:00) on Saturday 30 January 1937. It was advertised in Radio Times for two weeks later but the decision to end the Baird system was made too late for it be changed in the printed Radio Times.

Initially, the station's range was officially a 40 kilometres radius of the Alexandra Palace transmitter—in practice, however, transmissions could be picked up a good deal further away, and on one occasion in 1938 were picked up by engineers at RCA in New York, who were experimenting with a British television set. (Note: They filmed the static-ridden output they saw on their screen, and this poor-quality mute film footage is the only surviving record of 1930s British television filmed directly from the screen. Some images of programmes do survive in newsreels, which also contain footage shot in studios while programmes were being made, giving a feel for what was being done, albeit without directly replicating what was being shown on screen.) The service was reaching an estimated 25,000–40,000 homes before the outbreak of World War II which caused the BBC Television service to be suspended on 1 September 1939 with little warning.

=== Wartime closure (1939–1946) ===
On 1 September 1939, the station went off the air; the government was concerned that the VHF transmissions would act as a beacon to enemy aircraft homing in on London. Also, many of the television service's technical staff and engineers would be needed for the war effort, in particular on the radar programme. The last programme transmitted was a Mickey Mouse cartoon, Mickey's Gala Premier (1933), which was followed by test transmissions; this account refuted the popular memory according to which broadcasting was suspended before the end of the cartoon.

According to figures from Britain's Radio Manufacturers Association, 18,999 television sets had been manufactured from 1936 to September 1939, when production was halted by the war.

=== The remaining monopoly years (1946–1955) ===
BBC Television returned on 7 June 1946 at 10:00. Jasmine Bligh, one of the original announcers, made the first announcement, saying, 'Good afternoon, everybody. How are you? Do you remember me, Jasmine Bligh? Well, here we are after a lapse of nearly seven years ready to start again and of course we are all terribly excited and thrilled...' The Mickey Mouse cartoon of 1939 was repeated twenty minutes later. On 31 December the BBC broadcast First-year Flashbacks, a compilation of the year's highlights. An edited copy is now the oldest programme on the BBC's iPlayer streaming service.

Alexandra Palace was the home base of the channel until the early 1950s, when the majority of production moved into the newly acquired Lime Grove Studios. Postwar broadcast coverage was extended to Birmingham in 1949, with the opening of the Sutton Coldfield transmitting station on 17 December, and by the mid-1950s most of the country was covered, transmitting a 405-line interlaced video image on VHF.

=== The duopoly from 1955 ===
When ITV was launched in 1955, the BBC Television Service (renamed "BBC tv" in 1960) showed popular programming, including comedies, drama, documentaries, game shows, and soap operas, covering a wide range of genres and regularly competed with ITV to become the channel with the highest ratings for that week. The channel also introduced the science fiction show Doctor Who on 23 November 1963 - at 17:16 - which went on to become one of Britain's most iconic and beloved television programmes.

=== 1964 to 1967 ===
BBC TV was split into BBC1 and BBC2 in 1964, with BBC2 having a remit to provide more niche programming. The channel was due to launch on 20 April 1964, but this was postponed after a fire at Battersea Power Station resulted in most of west London, including Television Centre, losing power. A videotape made on the opening night was rediscovered in 2003 by a BBC technician. The launch went ahead the following night, beginning with host Denis Tuohy sarcastically blowing out a candle. BBC2 was the first British channel to use UHF and 625-line pictures, giving higher definition than the existing VHF 405-line television system.

=== 1967 to 2003 ===
A special ident was created in 1982 to celebrate 60 years of the BBC.

On 1 July 1967, BBC Two became the first television channel in Europe to broadcast regularly in colour, using the West German PAL system that was used for decades until it was gradually superseded by digital systems. (BBC One and ITV began 625-line colour broadcasts simultaneously on 15 November 1969). Unlike other terrestrial channels, BBC Two does not have soap opera or standard news programming, but a range of programmes intended to be eclectic and diverse (although if a programme has high audience ratings it is often eventually repositioned to BBC One). The different remit of BBC2 allowed its first controller, David Attenborough to commission the first heavyweight documentaries and documentary series such as Civilisation, The Ascent of Man and Horizon.

Attenborough was later granted sabbatical leave from his job as Controller to work with the BBC Studios Natural History Unit which had existed since the 1950s. This unit is now famed throughout the world for producing high quality programmes with Attenborough such as Life on Earth, The Private Life of Plants, The Blue Planet, The Life of Mammals, Planet Earth and Frozen Planet.

National and regional variations also occur within the BBC One and BBC Two schedules. England's BBC One output is split up into fifteen regions (such as South West and East), which exist mainly to produce local news programming, but also occasionally opt out of the network to show programmes of local importance (such as major local events). The other nations of the United Kingdom (Wales, Scotland and Northern Ireland) have been granted more autonomy from the English network; for example, programmes are mostly introduced by local announcers, rather than by those in London. BBC One and BBC Two schedules in the other UK nations can vary immensely from BBC One and BBC Two in England.

Programmes, such as the politically fuelled Give My Head Peace (produced by BBC Northern Ireland) and the soap opera River City (produced by BBC Scotland), have been created specifically to cater for some viewers in their respective nations. BBC Scotland produces daily programmes for its Gaelic-speaking viewers, including current affairs, political and children's programming such as the popular Eòrpa and Dè a-nis?. BBC Wales also produces a large amount of Welsh language programming for S4C, particularly news, sport and other programmes, especially the soap opera Pobol y Cwm ('People of the Valley') briefly shown on BBC2 across the UK with subtitles in the 1990s. The UK nations also produce a number of programmes that are shown across the UK, such as BBC Scotland's comedy series Chewin' the Fat, and BBC Northern Ireland's talk show Patrick Kielty Almost Live.

During the 1980s, the BBC came under pressure to commission more programmes from independent British production companies, and following the Broadcasting Act 1990 it was legally required to source 25% of its output from such companies by the terms of the Act. This eventually led to the creation of the "WoCC" (Window of Creative Competition) for independent production companies to pitch programmes to the BBC.

Programmes have also been imported mainly from English-speaking countries: notable—though no longer shown—examples include The Simpsons from the United States and Neighbours from Australia. Programming from countries outside the English-speaking world consisted of feature films, shown in the original language with subtitles instead of being dubbed, with dubbing only used for cartoons and children's programmes. These included programmes from Eastern Europe, including The Singing Ringing Tree from East Germany, although voice-over translation was used instead of dubbing for budgetary reasons.

Ceefax, the first teletext service, launched on 23 September 1974. This service allowed BBC viewers to view textual information such as the latest news on their television. CEEFAX did not make a full transition to digital television, instead being gradually replaced, from late onwards, by the new interactive BBCi service before being fully closed down on 22 October 2012.

In March 2003 the BBC announced that from the end of May 2003 (subsequently deferred to 14 July) it intended to transmit all eight of its domestic television channels (including the 15 regional variations of BBC1) unencrypted from the Astra 2D satellite. This move was estimated to save the BBC £85 million over the next five years.

While the "footprint" of the Astra 2D satellite was smaller than that of Astra 2A, from which it was previously broadcast encrypted, it meant that viewers with appropriate equipment were able to receive BBC channels "free-to-air" over much of Western Europe. Consequently, some rights concerns have needed to be resolved with programme providers such as Hollywood studios and sporting organisations, which have expressed concern about the unencrypted signal leaking out. This led to some broadcasts being made unavailable on the Sky Digital platform, such as Scottish Premier League and Scottish Cup football, while on other platforms such broadcasts were not disrupted. Later, when rights contracts were renewed, this problem was resolved.

=== 2006 onwards ===
The BBC Television department headed by Jana Bennett was absorbed into a new, much larger group; BBC Vision, in late 2006. The new group was part of larger restructuring within the BBC with the onset of new media outlets and technology.

In 2008, the BBC began experimenting with live streaming of certain channels in the UK, and in November 2008, all standard BBC television channels were made available to watch online via BBC iPlayer.

When Tony Hall became Director General in April 2013, he reverted the division to its original name of BBC Television. As Television it was responsible for the commissioning, scheduling and broadcasting of all programming on the BBC's television channels and online, as well as producing content for broadcast.

Following the 2016 Licence Fee settlement, BBC Television was split into two divisions, with in-house television production being separated into a new division called BBC Studios controlled by Mark Linsey and the remaining parts of television (channels and genre commissioning, BBC Sport and BBC iPlayer) being renamed as BBC Content, controlled by Charlotte Moore. As a result, the BBC Television division is now known internally as BBC Content and "BBC Television" as an entity has ceased to exist.

On 8 December 2020, Moore announced a new leadership structure for BBC Content taking effect in April 2021, which will prioritise iPlayer in order to compete with commercial streaming services. The role of Controller for BBC One, Two, and Four will be scrapped, in favour of giving the BBC's genre heads autonomy in commissioning programmes without the requirement for a channel controller to provide secondary approval. A team of "portfolio editors" will select from these commissions for carriage on BBC television channels and iPlayer, with iPlayer Controller Dan McGolpin will becoming Portfolio Director for iPlayer and channels. McGolpin and the genre heads will report to Moore.

In July 2022, the BBC announced plans to merge BBC News (for UK audiences) and BBC World News (for international audiences) as one international news network, under the name BBC News, covering news from both the UK and around the world. The merger took effect in April 2023.

In November 2024, six BBC FAST channels were added to Australia's 9Now platform.

== Funding ==
The BBC domestic television channels do not broadcast advertisements; they are instead funded by a television licence fee which TV viewers are required to pay annually. This includes viewers who watch real-time streams or catch up services of the BBC's channels online or via their mobile phone. The BBC's international television channels are funded by advertisements and subscription.

== Channels ==
=== Free-to-air in the UK ===
These channels are also available outside the UK in neighbouring countries e.g. Belgium, the Netherlands and the Republic of Ireland. For BBC News, CBBC and Cbeebies see national & international channels

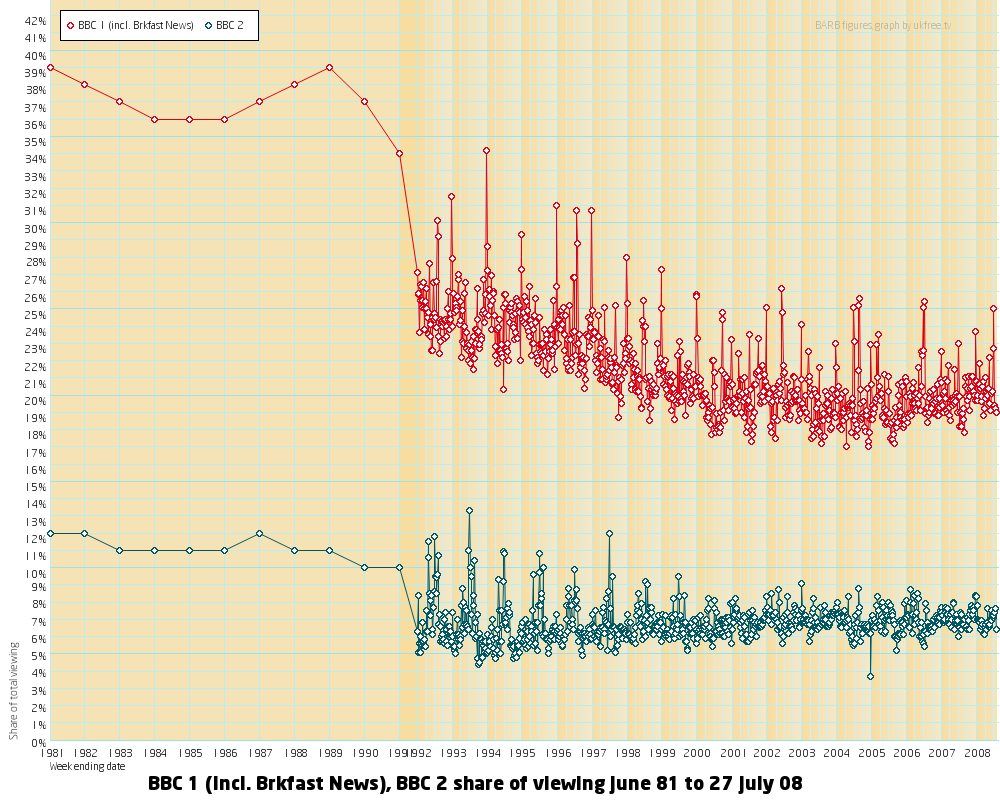
BBC UK viewing figures 1981–2008: BBC1 in red, BBC2 in teal

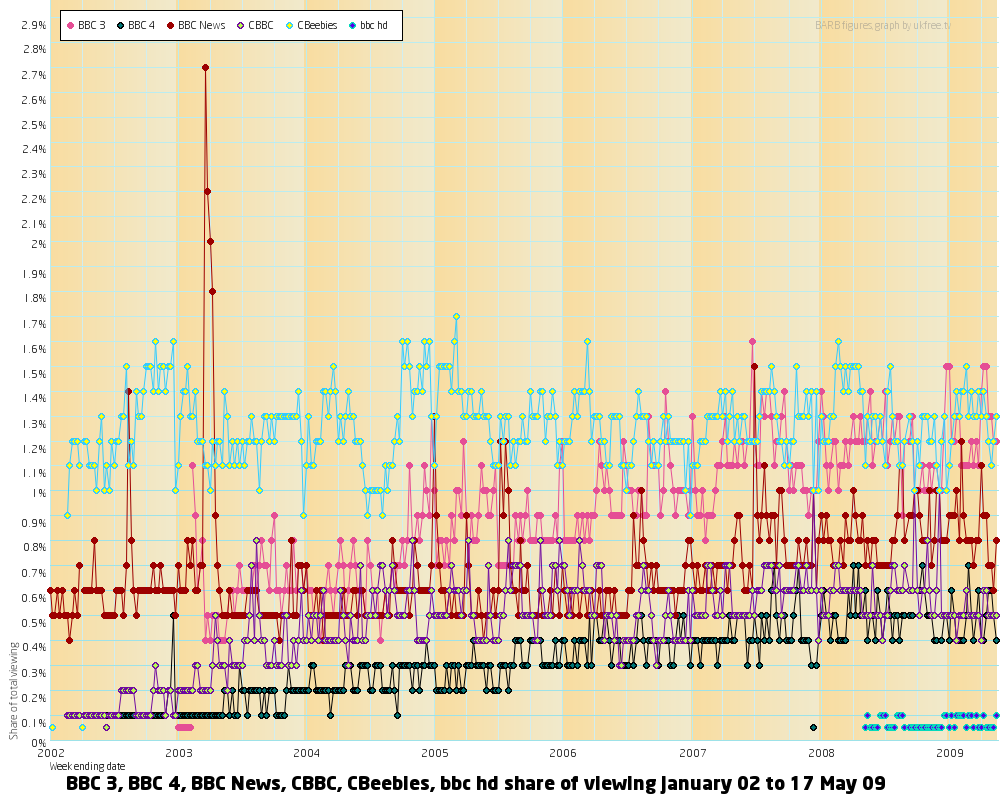
BBC UK viewing share, 2002–2013: BBC3, pink; BBC4, dark-green; BBC News, red; CBBC, light-green; CBeebies, yellow; BBC HD, purple; BBC Wales & West, blue

- BBC One

The Corporation's flagship network, broadcasting mainstream entertainment, comedy, drama, documentaries, films, news, sport, and some children's programmes. BBC One is also the home of the BBC's main news programmes, with BBC Breakfast airing every morning from 06:00 and bulletins airing at 13:00, 18:00 and 22:00 (on weekdays; times vary for weekend news bulletins) and overnight bulletins from the BBC News channel. The main news bulletins are followed by local news. These are provided by production centres in Wales, Scotland and Northern Ireland and a further 14 regional and sub-regional centres in England. The centres also produce local news magazine programming.
A high definition simulcast, BBC One HD, launched on 3 November 2010.

- BBC Two

Home to more specialist programming, including comedy, documentaries, dramas, children's programming and minority interest programmes, as well as imported programmes from other countries, particularly the United States. An important feature of the schedule is Newsnight, a 30-minute news analysis programme shown each weeknight at 22:30. There are slight differences in the programming for England and Scotland, Wales and Northern Ireland.
A high definition simulcast, BBC Two HD, launched on 26 March 2013.

- BBC Three

Home to mainly programming geared towards 16-34-year olds, particularly new comedies, drama, programs related to LGBTQ+, music, fashion and documentaries. This channel broadcasts every night from 19:00 to about 04:00 and timeshares with the CBBC channel.
A high definition simulcast, BBC Three HD, launched on 10 December 2013.
On 16 February 2016, BBC Three moved as an online-only content.
On 1 February 2022, BBC Three relaunched as a broadcast programming channel.

- BBC Four

Niche programming for an intellectual audience, including specialist documentaries, occasional 'serious' dramas, live theatre, foreign language films and television programmes and 'prestige' archive television repeats. This channel broadcasts every night from 19:00 to about 04:00 and timeshares with the CBeebies channel.
A high definition simulcast, BBC Four HD, launched on 10 December 2013.

- BBC Parliament

The Corporation's dedicated politics channel, covering both houses of the Parliament of the United Kingdom, and unicameral houses of Scottish Parliament, Senedd, and Northern Ireland Assembly.

=== National & international channels ===
- CBBC

Programming for children aged six and above. This channel is broadcast every day from 07:00 to 19:00 and timeshares with BBC Three. UK & Ireland, United States, Australia, and Canadian feeds.
A high definition simulcast, CBBC HD, launched on 10 December 2013.

- CBeebies

Programming for children aged six and under. This channel is broadcast every day from 06:00 to 19:00 and timeshares with BBC Four. UK & Ireland, International, South African, Asian and Spanish feeds and a programming block on BBC Kids.
A high definition simulcast, CBeebies HD, launched on 10 December 2013.

==== News channels ====
- BBC News (UK and World)

A dedicated English-language news channel based on the BBC's news service of the same name, covering news and sport from across the UK and around the world, 24 hours a day. There are several regional variations: UK & Ireland, Africa, Asia Pacific, Europe, Latin America, Middle East, North America and South Asia.

On 3 April 2023, the BBC merged the BBC News and BBC World News channels into a single networked news channel, but there are opt-outs for both the domestic and international versions.

- BBC News Arabic

A news and factual programming channel broadcast to the Middle East and North Africa. It was launched on 11 March 2008.

- BBC Persian

News channel that targets Persian-speaking countries including Iran, Afghanistan and Tajikistan in the Persian/Dari/Tajiki language.

=== Other public services ===
- S4C

Although this Welsh language channel is not operated by the corporation, the BBC contributes programmes funded by the licence fee as part of its public service obligation. The BBC used to broadcast Welsh-language programmes on its own channels in Wales, but these were transferred to S4C when it started broadcasting in 1982. S4C is available on iPlayer but without adverts there.

- BBC Alba

A part-time Scottish Gaelic channel. Although it carries the BBC name, it is a partnership between the BBC and MG Alba, with the majority of funding coming from the Scottish Government via MG Alba. Scottish Gaelic programmes were also shown on BBC Two in Scotland – subject to approval from the BBC Trust, but moved to BBC Alba after digital switchover.

- BBC Scotland

Launched on 24 February 2019, the BBC Scotland channel replaced the Scottish version of BBC Two and is home to homegrown Scottish programming. The Nine (and The Seven) are Scottish news programmes, similar to BBC Reporting Scotland. BBC Scotland also airs Scottish comedy, drama, sport, documentaries and music.

- BBC Weather Live

Launched on iPlayer under the news section, it shows various live conditions and forecasts from across the UK.

=== BBC Studios ===
The BBC's wholly owned commercial subsidiary, BBC Studios, also operates several international television channels under BBC branding:

BBC America
A US general entertainment channel, distributed in co-operation with AMC Networks, showcasing British television programming.
BBC Brit
An entertainment subscription television channel featuring male-skewed factual entertainment programming. Launched 1 February 2015 in Poland, April 2015 for Denmark, Norway, Sweden, Finland and Iceland replacing BBC Entertainment.
BBC Canada
A Canadian general entertainment channel, co-owned with Corus Entertainment, showing Canadian and British television programming. Closed down on 31 December 2020.
BBC Earth
A documentary subscription television channel featuring premium factual programming. Launched 1 February 2015 in Poland, April 2015 for Denmark, Norway, Sweden, Finland and Iceland and as of 14 April 2015 in Hungary replacing BBC Knowledge also replaced BBC Knowledge in Asia (Cambodia, Hong Kong, Indonesia, Malaysia, Mongolia, Singapore, South Korea, Taiwan, Thailand and Vietnam) as of 3 October 2015 – 21h00 Singapore/Hong Kong Time
BBC Entertainment
Broadcasts comedy, drama, light entertainment and children's programming by BBC and other UK production houses, available in the following regions: Europe (except Scandinavia and Eastern Europe), Turkey and Israel.
BBC First
An entertainment subscription television channel featuring drama, crime and comedy programming. The channel kicked off in Australia on 3 August 2014. Currently available in the following regions: Asia, Australia, Benelux, Central and Eastern Europe (Croatia, Macedonia, Poland and Slovenia), Middle East & North Africa and South Africa.
BBC HD
A high-definition channel gradually replaced by other BBC Studios channels, currently still available in Turkey.
BBC Knowledge
Documentaries and factual programming, currently available in Australia and New Zealand.
BBC Lifestyle
Lifestyle programming, currently available in Asia, Poland and South Africa.
BBC UKTV
An entertainment channel in Australia and New Zealand, carrying drama and comedy programmes from the BBC, Talkback Thames, ITV1, and Channel 4.

The BBC also owns the following:

UKTV
Commercial television network in the United Kingdom. The channels broadcast mainly BBC archive and specially produced programming.

BBC Japan was a general entertainment channel, which operated between December 2004 and April 2006. It ceased operations after its Japanese distributor folded.

== Timeline ==
BBC Television channel timeline, 1980s to present (includes joint ventures, excludes timeshifts and minor localisations)
Type	1980s										1990s										2000s										2010s										2020s					
Type	0	1	2	3	4	5	6	7	8	9	0	1	2	3	4	5	6	7	8	9	0	1	2	3	4	5	6	7	8	9	0	1	2	3	4	5	6	7	8	9	0	1	2	3	4	5
General
General	BBC1																	BBC One																												
General	BBC2																	BBC Two																												
General								BBC1/2 Mix			BBC E	BBC WSTV (Europe)																																		
General																			BBC Choice																											
General																				BBC Text		BBCi							BBC Red Button							BBC Red Button+										
General																						BBC Kids																				BBC Kids				
General																							BBC Four																							
General																							CBBC																							
General																							CBeebies																							
General																								BBC Three																						
General																											BBC HD (UK)																			
General																													BBC HD (international)																	
General																													BBC Alba																	
General																																								BBC Scotland						
News & factual											TEC																																			
News & factual															BBC A														BBC Arabic Television															BBC News Arabic		
News & factual																BBC World													BBC World News															BBC News		
News & factual																		BBC News 24											BBC News																	
News & factual																			BBC Parliament																											
News & factual																														BBC Persian Television														BBC Persian		
News & factual																																												BBC News Afghanistan		
Factual									BMT				BBC S																																	
Factual																	Animal Planet																													
Factual																		UK Horizons							UKTV Documentary																					
Factual																				BBC Knowledge																										
Factual																							UK History		UKTV History					Yesterday															U&Yesterday	
Factual																									UKTV People					Blighty																
Factual																												BBC Knowledge (international)																		
Factual																														Eden																
Factual																														Really																
Factual																																				BBC Earth										
Factual																																								BBC Antiques Roadshow UK						
Factual																																									BBC Travel					
Factual																																									BBC History					
Factual																																												BBC Game Shows		
Factual																																												BBC Impossible		
Factual																																												UKTV Play Heroes	U&Real Heroes	
Factual																																												UKTV Play FT	U&Transport	
Factual																																												UKTV Play Uncovered	U&The Past	
Factual																																													BBC Dinos 24/7	
Factual																																														BBC Select
Factual & comedy																																				BBC Brit										
Factual & comedy																																											BBC Top Gear			
Factual & comedy																																												BBC Nordic		
Lifestyle																		UK Style							UKTV Style					Home												BBC Home		BBC Home & Garden		
Lifestyle																						UK Food			UKTV Food					Good Food																
Lifestyle																							BBC Food																		BBC Food					
Lifestyle																								UK BI	UKTV BI																					
Lifestyle																										UKTV SG		UKTV G																		
Lifestyle																												BBC Lifestyle																		
Lifestyle																																							BBC Liv							
Drama, comedy & factual											BBC WSTV (Asia)				BBC Prime											BBC Entertainment																				
Drama, comedy & factual													UK Gold												UKTV Gold																					
Drama, comedy & factual																	UK.TV													UKTV					BBC UKTV											
Drama, comedy & factual																		People+Arts																												
Drama, comedy & factual																			BBC America																											
Drama, comedy & factual																					BBC Canada																									
Drama, comedy & factual																									BBC JP																					
Drama, comedy & factual																													Watch								W								U&W	
Drama, comedy & factual																																												BBC Sci-Fi		
Drama, comedy & factual																																														BBC Entertain
Drama																		UK Arena			UK Drama				UKTV Drama									Drama											U&Drama	
Drama																													Alibi																	
Drama																																			BBC First											
Drama																																									BBC Drama					
Drama																																									BBC Doctor Who					
Drama																																												BritBox Mysteries		
Drama																																												Silent Witness & New Tricks		
Drama																																														BBC NL
Comedy, sport & music																			UKGC									Gold																	U&Gold	
Comedy, sport & music																			UK Play			Play UK		UK G2	UKTV G2						Dave														U&Dave	
Comedy, sport & music																																												BBC Comedy		
Comedy, sport & music																																												UKTV Play Laughs		U&Laughs

== See also ==
- List of television programmes broadcast by the BBC
- History of BBC television idents
- BBC television drama
- BBC Local Radio
- BBC World Service
- British Broadcasting Company for a history of the BBC prior to 1927.
- Timeline of the BBC for a chronological overview of BBC history.
- Prewar television stations
- Freesat
