= List of BBC television channels and radio stations =

Logo used since 2021

This is a list of local, regional, national and international television channels and radio stations owned by the British Broadcasting Corporation (BBC) in the United Kingdom and around the world. The radio and television channel numbers are not correlated based on content categories.

== List of television channels ==
In the UK, as well as on Freeview, satellite and cable services, the BBC's licence-funded television channels and their programmes can be watched live and on demand via BBC iPlayer. They can also be seen in Ireland and some parts of mainland Europe.

=== National ===
| Name | Logo | Description | Airtime per day |
|---|---|---|---|
| BBC One | | Flagship channel. Broadcasts a variety of mainstream programming. | 24 hours |
| BBC Two | | Secondary channel. Broadcasts a range of alternative programming. | 24 hours |
| BBC Three | | Broadcasts a variety of youthful programming. | 9 hours (19:00 to 04:00) |
| BBC Four | | Broadcasts a range of serious programming. | 9 hours (19:00 to 04:00) |
| BBC News | | Rolling news and current affairs. | 24 hours |
| BBC Parliament | | Parliamentary coverage. | 24 hours |
| CBBC | | Programming for children over the age of six. | 12 hours (07:00 to 19:00) |
| CBeebies | | Programming for children under the age of six. | 13 hours (06:00 to 19:00) |

=== Regional ===
| Name | Logo | HD Channel | Language |
|---|---|---|---|
| BBC One Northern Ireland | | BBC One Northern Ireland HD | English |
| BBC One Scotland | | BBC One Scotland HD | English |
| BBC One Wales | | BBC One Wales HD | English |
| BBC Two Northern Ireland | | BBC Two Northern Ireland HD | English & Gaeilge (Irish) |
| BBC Two Wales | | BBC Two Wales HD | English |
| BBC Scotland | | BBC Scotland HD | English |
| BBC Alba | | | Gàidhlig (Scottish Gaelic) |

==== S4C ====
The Welsh language channel S4C is funded from the BBC-administered TV licence, but is not owned by the BBC and operates independently.

| Name | Logo | HD Channel | Language |
|---|---|---|---|
| S4C | | S4C HD | Cymraeg (Welsh) |

=== Local (England) ===
| Name | Sub-opt | Map |
|---|---|---|
| BBC One East | Previously (1997–2022) East from Norwich and West from Cambridge | Map of the BBC English regions |
| BBC One East Midlands | | Map of the BBC English regions |
| BBC One London | | Map of the BBC English regions |
| BBC One North East & Cumbria | | Map of the BBC English regions |
| BBC One North West | | Map of the BBC English regions |
| BBC One South | Previously (2000-2022) BBC Oxford for Oxford and the surrounding areas | Map of the BBC English regions |
| BBC One South East | | Map of the BBC English regions |
| BBC One South West | BBC Channel Islands for the Channel Islands | Map of the BBC English regions |
| BBC One West | | Map of the BBC English regions |
| BBC One West Midlands | | Map of the BBC English regions |
| BBC One Yorkshire & Lincolnshire | | Map of the BBC English regions |
| BBC One Yorkshire | | Map of the BBC English regions |

== List of UKTV channels ==
UKTV is a multichannel broadcaster owned by BBC Studios, therefore, the channels are not funded by the television licence, and are operated independently from the BBC-branded channels.

| Name | Description | HD | +1 | Package |
|---|---|---|---|---|
| U&Alibi | Crime drama | U&Alibi HD | U&Alibi +1 | Pay |
| U&Dave | Comedy | U&Dave HD | U&DaveJaVu | Free-to-air |
| U&Drama | Drama | U&Drama HD | U&Drama +1 | Free-to-air |
| U&Eden | Nature | U&Eden HD | U&Eden +1 | Free-to-air |
| U&Gold | Classic comedy | U&Gold HD | U&Gold +1 | Pay |
| U&W | Entertainment | U&W HD | U&W +1 | Free-to-air |
| U&Yesterday | History | U&Yesterday HD | U&Yesterday +1 | Free-to-air |

== List of international television channels ==
Commercially funded BBC Studios and BBC Global News, as well as state-funded BBC World Service operate and distribute these linear television services around the world. These services are not to be confused with the domestic channels operated in the United Kingdom and accessible in the Republic of Ireland.

| Name | Description |
|---|---|
| BBC News | An international English language news network from BBC Global News available worldwide. |
| BBC News Arabic | Arabic news channel available in the Arab World. Operated by BBC World Service. |
| BBC News Persian | Persian news channel available in Europe, Iran, Afghanistan and Tajikistan. Operated by BBC World Service. |
| BBC America | United States, a mixture of comedy, drama and lifestyle programming. Formerly a joint venture between BBC Studios Channels with AMC Networks until November 2024, now wholly owned by AMC Networks. |
| BBC First | Comedy and drama programming. |
| BBC Brit | Factual entertainment programming. |
| BBC Earth | Premium factual programming and documentaries. Also identified as Sony BBC Earth in India owing to joint venture partnership. |
| BBC HD | High-definition television channel. Available on watercraft and about entirely defunct across national markets. |
| BBC Lifestyle | Lifestyle programming. |
| BBC UKTV | Australia, and New Zealand, best of British entertainment programming. |
| BBC Nordic | Nordic countries, Factual entertainment and documentaries programming. |
| BBC Kids | Australia, and New Zealand, Programming for children over the age of six. |
| CBeebies | Programming for children under the age of six. |
| CBeebies International | Same as previous channel. |
| BBC NL | Netherlands, Drama and some entertainment. |
| BBC Belgium | Belgium, Drama and some entertainment. |

== List of national radio stations ==
| Name | Logo | Description | FM | AM | DAB & Digital TV | BBC Sounds |
|---|---|---|---|---|---|---|
| BBC Radio 1 | | Youth-orientated music, pop, hip-hop, R&B, dance, electronica, rock, indie and alternative. | Yes | No | Yes | Yes |
| BBC Radio 1Xtra | | Black music, hip-hop, R&B and dancehall. | No | No | Yes | Yes |
| BBC Radio 1 Dance | | Classic, current and future electronic dance music, with mixes and archives. | No | No | Yes | Yes |
| BBC Radio 2 | | Adult-orientated music, country, jazz, blues, soul and funk. | Yes | No | Yes | Yes |
| BBC Radio 3 | | Classical music, opera, jazz, world music, drama, arts and culture. | Yes | No | Yes | Yes |
| BBC Radio 4 | | Spoken-word programming, news, current affairs, talk, drama, comedy, documentaries, science, history, philosophy, arts and culture. | Yes | | | Yes |
| BBC Radio 4 Extra | | Archive programming. | No | No | Yes | Yes |
| BBC Radio 5 Live | | News, current affairs, discussion and sport. | No | Yes | | Yes |
| BBC Radio 5 Sports Extra | | Additional sports coverage. | No | No | Yes | Yes |
| BBC Radio 6 Music | | Alternative music, rock, reggae and other minor genres. | No | No | Yes | Yes |
| BBC Asian Network | | Station for the British Asian community. | No | In some areas | Yes | Yes |
| BBC World Service | | International radio station for current affairs. | No | No | Yes | Yes |

== List of regional radio stations ==
=== Scotland ===
- BBC Radio Scotland – An English-language radio station for Scotland.
- BBC Radio nan Gàidheal – A Scottish Gaelic language radio station.
- BBC Radio Orkney – A part-time radio station for Orkney which opts out of Radio Scotland.
- BBC Radio Shetland – A part-time radio station for Shetland which opts out of Radio Scotland.

=== Wales ===
- BBC Radio Wales – An English-language radio station covering Wales.
- BBC Radio Cymru – A Welsh language radio station.
- BBC Radio Cymru 2 – A part-time Welsh language radio station which opts out at breakfast time from Radio Cymru.

=== Northern Ireland ===
- BBC Radio Ulster – A radio station for Northern Ireland.
- BBC Radio Foyle – A part-time station covering Derry which opts out of BBC Radio Ulster.

== List of local radio stations ==
BBC Local Radio logo used since 2021

BBC Local Radio areas and studios (Guernsey and Jersey not shown)

=== East ===
- BBC Essex
- BBC Radio Cambridgeshire
- BBC Radio Norfolk
- BBC Radio Northampton – Northamptonshire
- BBC Radio Suffolk
- BBC Three Counties Radio – Bedfordshire, Buckinghamshire and Hertfordshire

=== East Midlands ===
- BBC Radio Derby – Derbyshire and East Staffordshire
- BBC Radio Leicester – Leicestershire and Rutland
- BBC Radio Nottingham – Nottinghamshire

=== London ===
- BBC Radio London – Greater London

=== North East and Cumbria ===
- BBC Radio Newcastle – Tyne and Wear, Northumberland and the northern part of County Durham
- BBC Radio Tees – Teesside, Whitby in North Yorkshire and the southern part of County Durham
- BBC Radio Cumbria

=== North West ===
- BBC Radio Lancashire
- BBC Radio Manchester – Greater Manchester, north east Cheshire and north west Derbyshire
- BBC Radio Merseyside – Merseyside and north and west Cheshire

=== South ===
- BBC Radio Berkshire – Berkshire, north Hampshire and parts of Buckinghamshire and South Oxfordshire
- BBC Radio Oxford – Oxfordshire and small parts of southwest Northamptonshire
- BBC Radio Solent – mid and south Hampshire, Dorset and the Isle of Wight

=== South East ===
- BBC Radio Kent
- BBC Radio Surrey – Surrey, northern West Sussex and north east Hampshire
- BBC Radio Sussex – East and West Sussex

=== South West ===
- BBC Radio Cornwall – Cornwall and the Isles of Scilly
- BBC Radio Devon
- BBC Radio Guernsey – Guernsey, Alderney, Herm and Sark
- BBC Radio Jersey

=== West ===
- BBC Radio Bristol – Bristol, Bath, North Somerset and South Gloucestershire
- BBC Radio Gloucestershire - Gloucestershire, excluding the South Gloucestershire district
- BBC Radio Somerset - Somerset excluding Bath and North Somerset
- BBC Radio Wiltshire

=== West Midlands ===
- BBC CWR – Coventry and Warwickshire
- BBC Hereford & Worcester - Herefordshire and Worcestershire
- BBC Radio Shropshire
- BBC Radio Stoke – north and mid Staffordshire and south Cheshire
- BBC Radio WM – The West Midlands metropolitan county and southern Staffordshire

=== Yorkshire ===
- BBC Radio Leeds – Leeds, Bradford and West Yorkshire
- BBC Radio Sheffield – Sheffield, South Yorkshire, north east Derbyshire and north Nottinghamshire
- BBC Radio York – York and North Yorkshire excluding Whitby

=== Yorkshire and Lincolnshire ===
- BBC Radio Humberside – Kingston-upon-Hull, the East Riding of Yorkshire and north Lincolnshire
- BBC Radio Lincolnshire - Lincoln and Lincolnshire excluding North Lincolnshire and North East Lincolnshire

== List of former TV channels and radio stations ==
=== Television ===
- BBC Two Scotland
- BBC 2W
- BBC Choice
- BBC Knowledge
- BBC HD
- BBC World Service Television
- BBC Prime
- BBC Entertainment
- BBC TV Europe
- BBC Japan
- BBC Food
- BBC Knowledge (international)
- BBC Kids
- BBC Canada

=== Radio ===
==== National stations ====
- BBC Home Service
- BBC National Programme
- BBC Light Programme
- BBC Regional Programme
- BBC Third Programme
- BBC Radio 5 (former)
- Radio 4 News FM
- BBC Radio 7

==== Regional stations ====
- BBC Radio Clwyd
- BBC Radio Gwent

==== Local stations ====
- BBC Dorset FM
- BBC Radio Durham
- BBC Radio Furness
- BBC Radio Swindon
- BBC Southern Counties Radio
- BBC Thames Valley FM
