= International BBC television channels =

British channels broadcast internationally

The BBC is forbidden under its charter to directly undertake any commercial operations on-air within the United Kingdom; however, no such restriction applies to operations in other countries. As a result, the BBC uses its vast television archive to operate a number of commercial television channels outside the United Kingdom through its subsidiary BBC Studios.

Some channels are wholly owned by BBC Studios, while others are joint ventures with other broadcasters.

== Wholly owned channels ==
- BBC Brit – an entertainment channel available in the Nordics, Poland and South Africa. Replaced by BBC Nordic in the Nordics in April 2023.
- BBC Earth – a documentary channel available in the Nordics, Romania, Poland, Eastern Europe, Turkey, Asia, South Africa and South America. Replaced by BBC Nordic in the Nordics in April 2023.
- BBC First – an entertainment channel focusing on comedy, crime and drama programming. Available in Asia, Australia, Benelux, Central and Eastern Europe (Croatia, North Macedonia, Poland and Slovenia), MENA and South Africa. BBC First was rebranded to BBC NL in the Netherlands in 2025.
- BBC HD – a high-definition television channel available on selected cruise ships and within the maritime industry. In many countries the channel has been replaced by other BBC Studios operations.
- BBC Kids – a channel for children aged 6 or under. Available in the USA, Taiwan, South Africa, India, Horn of Africa, Middle East and North Africa and South Korea.
- BBC Lifestyle – available in Poland, South Africa and Asia.
- BBC News – an International news channel from the BBC available worldwide (some programmes are shared with the UK-only BBC News).
- BBC News Arabic – Arabic news channel available in the Arab world.
- BBC News Persian – an Iranian/Afghan news channel available in Europe, Iran, Afghanistan and Tajikistan.
- BBC NL – a Dutch TV-station with drama and some entertainment in the Netherlands, launched in 2025, replacing BBC First in this country.
- BBC Nordic – an entertainment and documentary channel, replacing BBC Brit and BBC Earth in the Nordics.
- BBC UKTV – an entertainment channel available in Australia and New Zealand (formerly in a 20% joint venture with Foxtel (60%) and RTL (20%), but as of 1 July 2008 wholly owned).
- CBeebies – a channel for children. Available in Poland, South Africa, Asia, Australia and MENA, with the domestic channel also available in Belgium, the Netherlands and Switzerland.

=== Other ===
The domestic BBC channels are not distributed outside of the United Kingdom. However, these channels are widely available on cable and IPTV in Belgium, the Netherlands, Ireland and Switzerland.

- BBC Studios also operate the UKTV network in the United Kingdom and Ireland.

=== Defunct channels ===
- BBC Entertainment – entertainment channel available in Europe (except the Nordics and Eastern Europe), Turkey and Israel; ceasing operations on 31 March 2024
- BBC Food – Southern Africa/the Nordics; has been rolled into BBC Lifestyle
- BBC Japan – an entertainment channel available in Japan, ceased broadcasting in 2006, owing to the closure of its local distributor
- BBC Knowledge – an educational and informational channel available in Australia and New Zealand (not related to the UK-only BBC Knowledge, which has been replaced); it was closed on 10 October 2019 and replaced by BBC Earth
- BBC Prime – entertainment channel available in Africa, Asia and Europe; ceased operations on 11 November 2009 and subsequently replaced by BBC Entertainment

== Former joint ventures ==
=== United States ===
- BBC America – entertainment channel available in US. Previously owned by BBC Studios (50.01%) and AMC Networks (49.99%), currently owned by AMC Networks only.

=== Canada ===
In Canada, channels are required by the Canadian Radio-television and Telecommunications Commission (CRTC) to have a certain quota of original Canadian content. The following BBC channels are operated in conjunction with Corus Entertainment and Knowledge West Communications respectively, with BBC having a 20% stake in each channel.

- BBC Canada – entertainment channel available in Canada
- BBC Kids – children's channel available in Canada

== History ==
=== BBC World Service Television (1991–1994) ===
BBC World News (formerly known as BBC World Service Television) was officially launched by Actress of the Republic of Indonesia's Djenar Maesa Ayu on 15 November 1991 at 20:00 HKT from the Hong Kong International Airport (formerly known as Kai Tak International Airport) in Kowloon Bay located of Kowloon Peninsula with 100-original staff members. It showed news programming from BBC1 and BBC2 in addition to BBC World Service News.

Its schedule consists of some locally made programs in Hong Kong as well as news programmes from STAR News, it signed an agreement with CNN International News, allowing its access to that channel's programming. It also relayed Seputar Indonesia news programme from Indonesian free-to-air terrestrial television channel's RCTI which was also available in Hong Kong.

STAR TV, would buy 20 per cent of BBC WSTV, giving it a firmer foothold in Asia.

Following STAR TV acquisition by Rupert Murdoch, BBC WSTV was removed from the satellite beam that broadcast across East Asia on 1 March 1994. However, it was meant to still be on-air in South Asia until 31 March 1996.

In mid-1994, there was a commercial dispute between BBC World Service Television and STAR TV, where the proposed joint venture by the latter was inconclusive and News Corporation didn't pay for the support and services that BBC News provided after over 3 years. As a result, their license for using the name BBC Television would initially expire. At British Broadcasting Corporations request, the deadline was extended twice from 1 February and finally on 30 April 1994. Following that, Rupert Murdoch is asking for a compensation of about HK$102.5 trillion (US$250 million) from the said company. This situation is said to benefit new look and rebranded which may become the next service that completely replaces BBC News. The dispute also caused BBC World Service Television to lose its monopoly to broadcast the STAR News.

BBC World Service Television was removed on STAR TV, which led the launch of 2-stations: it screened both English and Chinese movies on "STAR Movies", with both movie premiere satellite channels broadcasting each type of movies, launched on 1 May 1994 at 00:00 HKT such as:

1. "Fox Movies (was formerly known as STAR Movies)" – was a 24-hour movie channel based in the Hong Kong. It showed movies made by 20th Century Fox and other distributors.
2. "STAR Chinese Movies" – is a 24-hour Chinese movie channel based in the Republic of China (Taiwan) were still copyrighted from Hong Kong with studio by STAR TV Filmed Entertainment, produced by Fortune STAR Entertainment & distributed by Media Asia Entertainment Group based in Kowloon Peninsula in 1993.

=== BBC World and BBC Prime ===
The BBC's international operations initially consisted of a single channel – BBC World Service Television. On Thursday, 26 January 1995 at 19:00 GMT this was split into two television stations:

- Launched Monday, 16 January 1995 at 19:00 GMT: 24-hour English free-to-air terrestrial international news channel named "BBC World" (now BBC World News).
- Launched Monday, 30 January 1995 at 19:00 GMT: 24-hour English subscription lifestyle, variety & entertainment channel named "BBC Prime" (now BBC Entertainment).

The organisation subsequently launched localised stations focused on a particular area, such as BBC Food (the Nordics) and BBC America alongside BBC World and BBC Prime.

In October 2006, BBC Entertainment replaced BBC Prime in Asian markets, and went on to replace it in other territories during the period 2007–2009. Other channels that were rolled out internationally included BBC Knowledge and BBC Lifestyle, and an international version of CBeebies. The aim of the new launches was to simplify and diversify the BBC Worldwide offering in the digital age. These launches absorbed some channels, such as BBC Food (into BBC Lifestyle), though channels focused on a particular local market (such as BBC America or BBC Persian TV) continued.

=== BBC World News ===
On 21 April 2008, BBC World was renamed BBC World News and new graphics were produced by the Lambie-Nairn design agency, accompanied by reworked music from David Lowe as part of a £550,000 rebranding of the BBC's news output and visual identity.

On 15 November 2010, BBC Worldwide sold 50% of its shares in Animal Planet and Liv to Discovery Communications for $156 million.

==== Internet, TV and film ====
- BBC Television which includes BBC Red Button
- BBC Radio
- BBC iPlayer
- BBC Online
- BBC Earth Films
- BBC Film
- BBC Orchestras and Singers
- S4C
