= BBC Player =

Video on demand service

- Available in: India, Malaysia (can also be in Unifi TV 2.0 Malaysia Only), Poland, Singapore, Taiwan, Czech Republic & Slovakia (can also be in Magenta TV & Magio TV Services.)
- Owner: BBC Studios
- Website: https://player.bbc.com/en/
- Launched: 2016

Former BBC Player logo used from 2016 to 2023.

BBC Player is an authenticated multi-genre subscription video on demand service operated by BBC Studios (formerly BBC Worldwide) for the International market. It is available online and as an app.

Former logo used from 2023 to 2024.

The service debuted in Singapore in summer 2016 to StarHub subscribers, in Malaysia in March 2017 with Telekom Malaysia, in Poland in June 2022 with Canal+, and most recently in Taiwan in August 2023 with Taiwan Mobile myVideo.

BBC Player offers curated content from BBC global brands – BBC Earth, BBC First, BBC Lifestyle, CBeebies and BBC World News. Although not available to watch on linear TV in Asia, BBC Brit is available to watch on BBC Player.

The most popular British programmes are available through the service, including Top Gear, Doctor Who, The Great British Bake Off and Sherlock.
