= BBC Living =

- Country: Australia
- Broadcast area: Australia

Programming
- Language(s): English

Ownership
- Owner: BBC Studios

History
- Launched: 1 May 2018; 7 years ago
- Closed: 1 November 2019; 5 years ago

BBC Living was a short-lived lifestyle channel from BBC Studios. It was available in Australia on Fetch TV from 1 May 2018 to 1 November 2019.

== History ==
At its launch the channel was described as "bringing audiences an aspirational mix of vibrant and exciting British lifestyle content centred around food, home and good living, BBC Living will be programmed exclusively for the Australian market. Featuring celebrity chefs like Gordon Ramsay, Raymond Blanc, Hairy Bikers, and Gary Rhodes together with shows like Come Dine with Me, Fantasy Homes By the Sea, Marbella Mansions, Peter Andre’s 60 Minute Makeover and Home Away From Home, the new channel will bring viewers some of the UK’s best-loved programmes, offering a wealth of inspiration for home, family and life". The channel featured lifestyle programs that BBC Studios had the rights to, and had already not sold exclusive rights to for the Australian market.

When Foxtel stopped ordering BBC Knowledge, that channel ceased being available on the previous terms, and was replaced on both Foxtel and Fetch by BBC Earth on 10 October 2019. A customised version of BBC Brit that almost entirely replicated the final lineup of BBC Knowledge then replaced Fetch TV's feed of BBC Living on 1 November.
