= BBC Select =

BBC Select may refer to two services run by the British Broadcasting Corporation, or BBC:

- BBC Select (1992–1995), a former overnight television service run from 1992 to 1995
- BBC Select (streaming service), a streaming service launched in North America in February 2021
