= BBC First (Australian TV channel) =

Defunct subscription TV channel

BBC First Australia
- Logo used from 2022 to 2024.
- Broadcast area: Australia

Programming
- Picture format: 576i (16:9 SDTV); 1080i (16:9 HDTV)

Ownership
- Owner: BBC Studios
- Sister channels: BBC Brit; BBC Earth; BBC Kids; BBC UKTV; BBC News; CBeebies

History
- Launched: 3 August 2014; 12 years ago
- Closed: 31 July 2024; 2 years ago

Links
- Website: http://www.bbcaustralia.com/channels/first/

Availability

Streaming media
- Foxtel Go: Channel 117
- Fetch Mobi: Channel 114
- Binge: binge.com.au

BBC First was an entertainment subscription television channel broadcasting in Australia. It was the localised version of the internationally available BBC First. The channel was wholly owned and operated by BBC Studios.

== History ==
On 17 April 2013, it was announced that the BBC had forged a new exclusive deal with Australian subscription television provider Foxtel, which would see a new channel launched that would feature comedy and drama content, with programming screening as close to their original UK transmission as possible.

The following day it was announced that this deal resulted in the end of a 50-year-old deal with Australian free-to-air broadcaster ABC, which they were not consulted about. Despite the new exclusive deal with Foxtel, it does not affect 'grandfathering' agreements whereby series that are currently broadcasting on other networks are not affected and will remain on their current network. The programming that is shown on the new channel will not air on Australian free-to-air for at least 12 months after its first airing, if ever.

It was later announced the new channel would be named BBC First, a new global brand that would roll out in 2014, with Australia being the first location to launch the new channel. The Australian channel is available in linear format and in high definition, launching on 3 August 2014.

On 1 February 2015, BBC First launched on Australian IPTV service Fetch TV – ending Foxtel's exclusivity.

On 14 February 2017, BBC First was available in HD for Fetch TV customers.

The channel exited Foxtel and Binge on 31 July 2024. BBC Drama, a new channel, replaced BBC First on Fetch TV.

== Programming ==
The channel targets affluent people between 25 and 54 years old, with a specific target demographic of women aged 40–54.

=== Original programming ===
- Banished (co-production)

=== Acquired programming ===
- A Young Doctor's Notebook
- Alan Partridge: Welcome to the Places of My Life
- Burton & Taylor
- Call the Midwife (2015)
- Dates
- Dead Boss
- Derek (series 2)
- Dickensian
- Episodes (seasons 3–4)
- The Fall (series 2)
- The Fear
- The Game
- The Honourable Woman
- Luther
- Midwinter of the Spirit
- New Tricks (2015)
- The Night Manager
- The Musketeers
- Peaky Blinders
- The Politician's Husband
- Quirke
- War & Peace
- Wolf Hall (11 April 2015)
- The Village
