= Documentary Channel (New Zealand) =

Programming
- Picture format: 16:9

Ownership
- Owner: Documentary Channel Ltd

History
- Launched: 2007
- Closed: March 2011
- Replaced by: BBC Knowledge

Links
- Website: Official Site

Documentary Channel was a digital television channel in New Zealand. Documentary Channel launched in 2007, and was available via SKY TV on channel 074.

== Concept ==
The channel airs documentary programming. The channel features documentaries from independent companies based in New Zealand while also featuring documentaries from different global media organisations.

== Closure ==
On 8 December 2010, it was announced that the independent owners of the Documentary Channel have sold the channel to BBC Worldwide. The channel was replaced by BBC Knowledge New Zealand in March 2011. It continued to broadcast content culturally and socially relevant to the country.
