= BBC UKTV =

Australian pay television channel

- Country: Australia
- Broadcast area: Australia; New Zealand

Programming
- Language: English
- Picture format: 1080i HDTV
- Timeshift service: BBC UKTV +2

Ownership
- Owner: BBC Studios
- Sister channels: BBC Brit; BBC Earth; BBC First; BBC Kids; BBC News; UKTV International; CBeebies

History
- Launched: August 1996
- Replaced: BBC HD (BBC UKTV HD)
- Former names: UKTV (1996–2013)

Links
- Website: bbcaustralia.com/channels/uktv; bbcnewzealand.com/channels/uktv

Availability

Streaming media
- Foxtel Go (AU): Channel 105
- Fetch Mobi (AU): Channel 112
- Binge (AU): binge.com.au

BBC UKTV is an Australian pay television channel in Australia and New Zealand, screening British entertainment programming, sourced mainly from the archives of the BBC, RTL Group (mainly Talkback Thames material) and ITV plc. The channel was originally a joint venture with Foxtel (60% ownership), the RTL Group (20% ownership) and BBC Worldwide (20% ownership). It is now owned solely by BBC Studios.

== History ==
The channel was first launched in Australia in August 1996, becoming available on Austar in April 1999 and on Optus in December 2002. A New Zealand version with different programming launched on Sky TV, in November 2003.

It shows a mix of repeats of old UK shows previously screened in Australia or New Zealand and new episodes of programs not shown before in either country. Repeated series include Doctor Who, Hitchhiker's Guide to the Galaxy, Are You Being Served?, Dad's Army, Torchwood, Torchwood Declassified, The Jewel in the Crown, Never the Twain, The Sweeney, and The Bill that have already been seen on free-to-air terrestrial television in Australia. New series include Shameless, new episodes of popular soap operas Coronation Street and EastEnders and the original UK version of The Weakest Link which have not otherwise been screened in Australia. UK soap opera Family Affairs, which has never been screened on free-to-air Australian television, ran on UKTV from 1998 to 2007. In July 2006 UKTV began screening 2006 episodes of UK soap opera Emmerdale which had never before been screened in Australia.

As of April 2026, UKTV's episodes of EastEnders are currently five weeks behind the United Kingdom. Coronation Street and Emmerdale episodes are just over two weeks behind the original UK broadcasts.

In addition to British programming UKTV has repeated Australian soap operas Sons and Daughters and Prisoner which were both produced by the Reg Grundy Organisation (now owned by FremantleMedia). In both cases the entire series was shown; the Sons and Daughters repeat run was from 1997 until 2000 and Prisoner ran from 1997 until October 2004, Prisoner is now screening on 111 Hits from March 2011. It also screened the TVNZ soap opera Shortland Street for several years in the 1990s, after early episodes of that series had briefly been screened by SBS on free-to-air television in Australia.

In Australia, UKTV, like all pay TV drama channels, is legally required to spend 10 per cent of its total program expenditure on funding new eligible (Australian and New Zealand) drama programs. Such productions include Changi, Supernova, Make or Break and False Witness.

UKTV has separate services in Australia and New Zealand, partly to reflect different local tastes, but also for rights reasons, as many programmes are shown on free-to-air channels in New Zealand. For example, Coronation Street has been shown on TVNZ 1 for many years, while until May 2009, EastEnders was shown on Prime, before moving to UKTV.

On 1 July 2008 BBC Worldwide assumed full control of UKTV. BBC Worldwide previously had a 20 per cent stake in UKTV in a three way partnership with Foxtel and Fremantle Media. BBC Worldwide launched two new Australian channels, BBC Knowledge (documentary and non-fiction programming) and CBeebies (an advertising-free channel for 0 to six-year-olds) on 1 November 2008.

On 3 October 2009 UKTV revealed a new logo, displaying that of the BBC, although its name remained unchanged. On 15 November 2009 the channel launched an HD simulcast, replacing BBC HD.

In April 2013, the channel changed its logo and name to BBC UKTV.

On 1 July 2014, the HD simulcast closed, making the channel solely available in standard definition. This came prior to the launch of BBC First, which would use the HD feed formerly used by BBC UKTV. In addition, BBC UKTV changed subscription packages on Foxtel - moving from the Drama & Lifestyle add-on package to the basic Essential package increasing its reach.

On 1 February 2015, BBC UKTV launched on Australian independent IPTV service Fetch TV, after they won the broadcast rights to BBC Worldwide.

From 10 October 2016, the channel refreshed its logo and branding identity, to appeal to a younger audience and better distinguish its programming from the more premium offerings on sister channel BBC First.

In September 2022, BBC Studios partnered with South African FTA broadcaster, OpenView HD, to launch the channel in the country. It will be available on Channel 114 as of 18 October 2022.

On 15 August 2024, the HD simulcast will relaunch on Foxtel.

== Original programming ==
- Changi (2001) (co-production with the ABC)
- Supernova (2005-06) (co-production with BBC Two)
- False Witness (2009) (co-production with BBC HD)
- Dripping in Chocolate (2012)
- Top of the Lake (2013–2017) (co-production with BBC Two and SundanceTV)

== Logo history ==
1996–2009

2009–2013

2013–2016

2016 – present
