= BBC Select (streaming service) =

British North American streaming service

- Company type: Streaming service
- Available in: English
- Area served: United States; Canada
- Owner: BBC Studios
- Industry: Entertainment, Internet
- Products: Streaming media; Video on demand
- Website: www.bbcselect.com
- Registration: Required
- Launched: 18 February 2021; 5 years ago
- Current status: Active

BBC Select is a streaming service in North America launched in February 2021. The service is owned by the BBC's commercial arm, BBC Studios, and features documentaries and factual programming previously shown in the United Kingdom on the BBC and shows from other British broadcasters, such as Channel 4's Grayson Perry's Big American Road Trip. It is available as an Amazon Prime Video Channel, and via Apple TV and Roku.
