= BBC Belgium =

- Logo used since 5 May 2026
- Country: Belgium
- Broadcast area: Belgium
- Network: BBC Benelux

Programming
- Languages: Dutch; English
- Picture format: 1080i HDTV (downscaled to 16:9 576i for the SDTV feed)

Ownership
- Owner: BBC Studios
- Sister channels: BBC One; BBC Two; BBC Three; BBC Four; BBC News; CBBC; CBeebies

History
- Launched: 5 June 2015; 11 years ago (as BBC First); 5 May 2026; 5 months ago (as BBC Belgium)
- Former names: BBC First (2015-2026)

Links
- Website: BBCBenelux.com

BBC Belgium is a Belgian TV-station of BBC Studios with drama and some entertainment. It is a pay television channel which launched in Belgium originally as BBC First on 4 June 2015. On 5 May 2026 BBC Belgium took over from BBC First in Belgium.

== History ==
BBC First launched in Belgium on 4 June 2015. The programme mix is specifically for the Belgium, with more emphasis placed on drama and crime series. All programming is subtitled in Dutch.

On 5 May 2026, BBC First was rebranded as BBC Belgium in Belgium.

== See also ==
- BBC Studios
- International BBC television channels
