= Extraordinary Women =

- Directed by: Yildalina Tatem Brache
- Written by: Yildalina Tatem Brache
- Starring: Gladys Gutiérrez, Josefina Padilla, Sina Cabral, Dedé Mirabal, Mary Marranzini, Ivelisse Prats, Rosaflor Tatem
- Cinematography: Ariel Mota
- Edited by: Francisco Durán, Christian Mejía, Guillermo Herrera, Kenn Williams Herrera, Edgar Tatem
- Music by: Edgar Tatem
- Distributed by: Indotel, Producciones 1961, Masita Post.Media.Film, Tatemcható Graphics
- Release date: August 20, 2009 (Santo Domingo)
- Running time: 90 minutes
- Country: Dominican Republic
- Language: Spanish

Extraordinary Women: Women in Time, Women Without It (Spanish: Mujeres extraordinarias: Mujeres en el tiempo, mujeres sin tiempo); is a 2009 Dominican documentary feature by director Yildalina Tatem Brache, where she captures the lives of six influential women from the Dominican Republic.

== Production ==
Yildalina Tatem Brache conceived the idea to make a project that illustrated the lives of women that have made substantial changes in Dominican history. In 2006 she started researching and picking 12 women, to write a book about them. When she approached the President of the Dominican Telecom Institute José Rafael Vargas, for financing, he suggested to change the idea of a book towards a film, so it would reach a wider audience. Yildalina accepted and started developing the project. Reduced the number of women to 6 and in December 2008, the project was given the 'green light' and filming started in February and ended in March 2009. The editing process commenced on April and ended in August. Only to be edited furthermore in September and October 2009 for the 'extended and improved version'.

== Plot ==
The women all candidly speak about the hardships they have been through, about their present and what they expect for the future. Gladys Gutiérrez fought against the Joaquín Balaguer regime along with her husband Henry Segarra. After her spouse mysteriously disappeared, she was exiled and was relocated to Paris, France; and there she kept being vocal about her disapproval of the Dominican government. Because of this, she was subjected to many death threats after her fellow militants were murdered.

Josefina Padilla was the first woman candidate for Dominican Vice presidency. Before that she was one of the most notable opponents in Rafael Trujillo's dictatorship, which resulted in her harassment from government officials, and the murder of her husband 'Papito' Sánchez.

Tomasina Cabral was brutally tortured during Trujillo's regime, she was the only known woman to have been subjected to that treatment at that time. She was also the friend who accompanied the Mirabal Sisters through their time in jail. Sina discloses how she copes with the past, and how she still stands for human rights after what was done to her.

Dedé Mirabal is the second and only surviving sister. Many describe her as 'The one that lived to tell the story'. She does not only speak about her sisters and the grief of losing them, she also expresses herself, and her own life. She fills in about what happened before and after her sisters' death, being joyful and also moving.

Mary Marranzini accounts for the difficult moments when her son fell ill from polio, and she had to fly to the United States for him to get the treatment he required. After that, she decided to look for people who would help her build what is now The Dominican Rehabilitation Association which she has been running since 1959.

Ivelisse Prats was the first woman in Latin America to be elected president of a political party. She is a member of the Dominican Revolutionary Party (Partido Revolucionario Dominicano), nonetheless, she still harshly criticizes the corruption that some of the members enable and permit. She describes, as they all do, her family life. The loss of her mother at 17, and her marriage shortly after; how she fell ill from depression, tuberculosis and anorexia after a long period of work excess and fasting so she could be able to feed her children.

== Filming and locations ==
Shooting started Friday, February 6, 2009 at the Dominican Rehabilitation Association headquarters where Mary Marranzini was interviewed in the early hours of morning. The second interview (with Josefina Padilla) was held on that day's afternoon at her apartment. The next woman to be interviewed was Gladys Gutiérrez. The film crew arrived at her building at 9:00 in the morning Sunday, February 8, 2009. The shooting ceased at approx. 5:00 that afternoon.

Dedé Mirabal was slated to be filmed on February 14, but due to previous commitments, she had to be rescheduled to Saturday, February 21. In Salcedo, Dominican Republic, at her home in Ojo de Agua, which was the same house she had been living in since birth, and the residence she shared with her sisters before murdered. Ivelisse Prats was next, she was filmed in her own house in La Castellana, an upper-middle-class neighborhood in Santo Domingo. In March Yildalina Tatem Brache held what would be the last interview for the documentary, with Sina Cabral, also in her home.

== Cast ==
- Gladys Gutiérrez
- Josefina Padilla
- Tomasina Cabral
- Bélgica Adela (Dedé) Mirabal
- Mary Pérez de Marranzini
- Ivelisse Prats Ramírez de Pérez
- Rosaflor Tatem Brache (Narrator)

== Premiere and screenings ==
The premiere for Mujeres Extraordinarias was held August 20, 2009 at the Eduardo Brito National Theater, in Santo Domingo, Dominican Republic, approximately 1,250 people were in attendance. The second screening was held at Don Bosco Theater in Moca, Dominican Republic.

A slightly extended and improved version was presented at the Autonomous University of Santo Domingo, November 16, 2009. This same version had 4 subsequent screenings, one in Santiago, November 18, 2 at the Dominican Cinémathèque, November 26 and 27, and another, November 30 in Universidad Iberoamericana (UNIBE). The documentary also screened again at the Autonomous University of Santo Domingo on November 23, 2015.
