= BBC Knowledge (international) =

Former international television channel

- Country: United Kingdom

Programming
- Picture format: 576i (SDTV); 1080i (HDTV)

Ownership
- Owner: BBC Studios
- Sister channels: CBeebies; BBC World News; BBC Lifestyle; BBC HD; BBC Entertainment; BBC First

History
- Launched: July 29, 2007; 19 years ago
- Closed: 1 February 2015; 11 years ago (Poland); 13 April 2015; 11 years ago (Nordic Countries); 14 April 2015; 11 years ago (Hungary, Romania & Turkey); 1 September 2015; 11 years ago (Africa); 3 October 2015; 10 years ago (Asia); 1 March 2016; 10 years ago (Italy); 22 October 2018; 7 years ago (New Zealand); 10 October 2019; 6 years ago (Australia)
- Replaced by: BBC Four; BBC Earth (international TV channel)

Links
- Website: bbcstudios.com.au/channels/knowledge

Availability (at the time of closure)

Streaming media
- Foxtel Go: Channel 612

BBC Knowledge is a former television channel available in various countries outside the United Kingdom, showcasing factual and non-fiction entertainment programming from the BBC and independent UK production houses. Wholly owned by BBC Studios, it is not related to the previous channel known as BBC Knowledge, an early digital channel available within the UK, which closed down in 2002 in favour of BBC Four and CBeebies.

At one time, the channel provided five key programming strands enabling simple appointment viewing:

- The World focused on culture and geography.
- Science & Technologywas about the sciences and technology.
- People explored human biology and psychology
- The Past had a focus on history.
- "Business" focused on the economy and business.

On 15 November 2009, BBC Knowledge in Australia changed their channel location from Channel 619 to Channel 612.

In 2014 it was announced that BBC Studios would rollout a new channel, BBC Earth, which would replace BBC Knowledge in most locations, except for where it was successful. Poland was the first location to launch the new brand on 1 February 2015.

== Launch and closure dates ==
BBC Knowledge was first launched in Singapore on mio TV (Now in Singtel TV) on 29 July 2007. It has been available on now TV in Hong Kong since October 2007 and on the Cyfrowy Polsat digital satellite platform in Poland from December 2007 (Cyfra Plus in Poland plans its launch only on 1 Feb 2011 due to prior exclusive BBC deals with Polsat). BBC Knowledge launched in Indonesia on Indovision in April 2008, and in South Africa on DStv in September 2008. It has since also launched in the Scandinavian countries in November 2008 when it replaced BBC Prime on Canal Digital and several cable systems. It was launched in Australia on Foxtel and Optus Television on 1 November 2008; in South Korea on CJ HelloVision on 1 December 2008 and on GS Gangnam Broadcasting on 26 May 2009.

In June 2009, citing the lack of viewership, the BBC terminated its carriage deal with SingTel's mio TV to air BBC Knowledge, (along with CBeebies and BBC Lifestyle), and entered into an agreement with StarHub TV to carry the channels from 1 August 2009, and in Romania on 31 December 2010.

BBC Knowledge was launched on Cable TV Hong Kong on 29 October 2009.

The channel was launched in New Zealand in March 2011 replacing the Documentary Channel following that channel's sale to BBC Studios.

From 1 March 2011 the channel is broadcast in Italy too. It's visible, in standard definition until 1 March 2016.

On 13 August 2013 the channel launched on Digiturk in Turkey.

On 1 February 2015, BBC Knowledge launched on Australian IPTV service Fetch TV.

The New Zealand BBC Knowledge channel was replaced by a localized version of BBC Earth on 22 October 2018.

The final BBC Knowledge channel in Australia was relaunched as a localized version of BBC Earth on 10 October 2019, therefore ending the use of the BBC Knowledge brand after 12 years.

== Asia ==
- Alex Polizzi: The Fixer
- Andrew Marr's History of the World
- Africa 2013: Countdown to the Rains
- Bill Bailey's Jungle Hero
- Ben and James Versus the Arabian Desert
- Bend It Like Beckham
- Bang Goes the Theory
- China on Four Wheels
- Caribbean with Simon Reeve
- Deadly 60
- Dara O Briain's Science Club
- Doctor Who: Earth Conquest
- Duck Quacks Don't Echo
- David Attenborough Meets President Obama
- Engineering Giants
- Earthflight
- Extreme Fishing with Robson Green
- Frozen Planet
- Food Factory: Supersized
- Factomania
- Gordon Behind Bars
- Glastonbury
- Great Barrier Reef (2012 TV series)
- Galapagos 3D
- Guts: The Strange and Mysterious World of the Human Stomach
- How to Grow a Planet
- How Earth Made Us
- How to Build a Planet
- Hotel Hell
- Hidden Kingdoms
- Indian Ocean with Simon Reeve
- Inside the Animal Mind
- Jimmy's Forest
- James May's Man Lab
- James May's Toy Stories
- Kevin McCloud's Grand Tour
- Kingdom of Plants 3D
- Kangaroo Dundee
- Long Way Round
- Life Below Zero
- Million Dollar Intern
- Museum Secrets
- Monkeys Revealed
- Nature's Microworlds
- Natural World (TV series)
- Operation Snow Tiger
- Operation Cloud Lab: Secrets of the Skies
- Orbit: Earth's Extraordinary Journey
- Ocean Giants
- Planet Earth
- Prince Harry: Frontline Afghanistan
- PQ17: An Arctic Covnoy Disaster
- Ross Kemp: Extreme World
- Secret Millionaire
- Secrets of Bones
- Stargazing Live
- Supergiants Animals
- Snow Babies
- Scared Rivers with Simon Reeve
- Top Gear
- Toughest Place to Be A...
- Undercover Boss (British TV series)
- World's Weirdest Weapons
- Walking with Dinosaurs: The 3D Movie
- Wild Things with Dominic Monaghan
- Wild Burma: Nature's Lost Kingdom
- Welcome to India
- Wonders of the Solar System
- Wonders of Life (TV series)

== Australia ==
- An Idiot Abroad
- Dragons' Den
- Extraordinary Women
- Fishing Impossible
- Human Universe
- Islands of Britain
- Jeremy Clarkson's Extreme Machines
- Never Mind the Buzzcocks
- Road Warriors: The Extra Mile
- Ross Kemp: Extreme World
- School of Saatchi
- Stephen Fry's 100 Greatest Gadgets
- Moaning of Life
- World's...and Me
- Top Gear
- Top Gear: Extra Gear
- Top Gear (USA)
- Trawlermen
- Where the Wild Men Are
- Wonders of the Universe

== See also ==
- BBC World News
- BBC Lifestyle
- BBC Entertainment
- CBeebies
- BBC HD
- BBC Four
- BBC Earth
