= Nature's Microworlds =

- Also known as: Hidden Habitats
- Genre: Nature documentary
- Narrated by: Steve Backshall
- Country of origin: United Kingdom
- Original language: English
- No. of seasons: 2
- No. of episodes: 13

Production
- Producer: Doug Mackay-Hope
- Running time: 30 minutes
- Production company: BBC Natural History Unit

Original release
- Network: BBC Four
- Release: 16 July 2012 – 27 March 2013

Nature's Microworlds is a 2012 British nature documentary series. Produced by the BBC, the series is narrated by Steve Backshall and produced by Doug Mackay-Hope. There are thirteen thirty-minute episodes in the series, which was first broadcast on BBC Four. Each episode focuses on its eponymous region, exploring the wildlife of the microclimate found there: The featured ecosystems include the archipelago of volcanic islands known as the Galapagos, the grasslands of the Serengeti in Africa, the Amazon rainforest covering most of South America, the kelp forest located in California's Monterey Bay, the Okavango Delta where the Okavango River empties into a wetland surrounded by the Kalahari Desert, and the Arctic wilderness of the Svalbard archipelago. It was released as Hidden Habitats in some countries.

== Series overview ==
Series	Episodes	Originally released	
Series	Episodes	First released	Last released
1	7	16 July 2012	20 August 2012
2	6	23 January 2013	6 March 2013
3	3	13 March 2013	27 March 2013

== Episodes ==
There are thirteen thirty-minute episodes in the series—plus a three-part specials series—first broadcast on BBC Four on the dates shown.

=== Season 1 (2012) ===
No.	Title	Location	Original release date
1	"Galapagos"	Galapagos Islands	16 July 2012
2	"Serengeti"	Serengeti, Tanzania	23 July 2012
3	"Amazon"	Amazon rainforest, South America	30 July 2012
4	"Monterey Bay"	Monterey Bay, California	6 August 2012
5	"Okavango"	Okavango Delta, Botswana	13 August 2012
6	"Svalbard"	Svalbard	20 August 2012

=== Season 2 (2013) ===
No.	Title	Location	Original release date
7	"Canada's Coastal Forests"	British Columbia mainland coastal forests	23 January 2013
8	"Great Barrier Reef"	Great Barrier Reef, Australia	30 January 2013
9	"Namib Desert"	Namib Desert, Namibia & Angola	6 February 2013
10	"Yellowstone"	Yellowstone, United States	13 February 2013
11	"The Deep Sea"	Deep sea	20 February 2013
12	"Australia's Red Centre"	Deserts of Australia	27 February 2013
13	"Scottish Highlands"	Scottish Highlands	6 March 2013

=== Insect Specials (2013) ===
No.	Title	Location	Original release date
1	"Them & Us"	China, Africa	13 March 2013
2	"Making Worlds"	South America, East Africa	20 March 2013
3	"The Secret to Their Success"	Swiss Alps, Australia, Yellowstone	27 March 2013

== Critical reception ==
David Crawford of the Radio Times criticized the first episode for its short length and "lightly sketched" coverage of science, but wrote that it is "full of arresting images". A similar criticism was made by Jonathan Wright in The Guardian, who stated that the first episode is "far too short at 30 minutes and thus skims over some subjects". Crawford writes that the fifth episode, like the first, "packs a lot of information into its short running time," and praised the final episode on Svalbard, likening it to a " mini-episode of Frozen Planet" filled with "jaw-dropping, eye-covering scenes". The Guardian's Martin Skegg was more positive on the length of the final episode, writing that "relaying the complex interplay of life in just 30 minutes, the film is a punchy antidote to the sometimes bloated 'event' nature".
