= BBC Kids =

Television channel

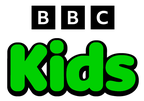

Programming
- Language: English

Ownership
- Owner: BBC Studios

Availability

Terrestrial
- Fetch TV (Australia): 250

BBC Kids is the international children's brand of BBC Studios, and has been applied to a number of TV services. It draws from the long history of children's programming on the BBC, and is strongly related to the CBBC channel in the UK.

== History ==
=== Canada ===
The BBC Kids brand was first introduced in Canada with the launch of the BBC Kids channel on 5 November 2001. It was described as a specialty television service devoted to educational and entertaining programming for children and youth (ages 2–17). Most of the channel's programming was from the UK. The channel was a joint venture between Alliance Atlantis and BBC Worldwide, the BBC's overseas operating arm.

Control was eventually transferred to Knowledge Network Corporation, a Crown corporation of the Government of British Columbia with BBC Worldwide retaining its existing interest. On 2 October 2018, a joint statement from Knowledge Network and BBC announced the channel would cease operations at the stroke of midnight on 1 January 2019. The channel's license was revoked by the CRTC on 10 January 2019, at the request of Knowledge.

=== Australia ===
BBC Kids launched on 24 April 2021 on Fetch TV in response to Cartoon Network and Boomerang entering an exclusivity agreement with Foxtel and departing the Fetch lineup. This complemented an existing CBeebies channel available in Australia, catering to children aged 0 to 6. The channel was launched with popular children's shows from the UK. It was removed from Fetch TV alongside CBeebies on 31 October 2024.

=== Online services ===
On 11 January 2022, BBC Kids launched as a FAST channel on Pluto TV in the United States, which airs select CBeebies and CBBC shows from the BBC Studios catalogue. A version of the channel that airs Spanish-dubbed programming titled "Niños por BBC" was launched on the same day. The channels closed on 1 November 2023, however BBC Kids continues to operate on Samsung TV Plus.

Taiwan Mobile myVideo has become the first streaming platform in Asia to launch BBC Kids as a Video on Demand channel, which was launched on 1 July 2022. The channel has included titles that had been previously aired on CBeebies Asia to bring along other titles that was tailored for kids audiences, such as Spy in the Wild and Deadly 60.

A BBC Kids subscription app service with 100 hours of content became available in South Africa in September 2022, through a partnership of Switch Media and MTN Group.

== Distribution ==
=== Current distribution ===
Launch date	Country (via streaming service)	Source
11 January 2022	United States (via Pluto TV from 11 January 2022 to 1 November 2023)	
1 July 2022	Taiwan (via Taiwan Mobile myVideo)	
1 September 2022	South Africa (via Switch Media and MTN)	
24 July 2023	India (via Prime Video)	
2 February 2024	Horn of Africa (via MBC 3 and Shahid)	
2 February 2024	Middle East and North Africa (via Flydubai, MBC 3 and Shahid)	
2 April 2024	South Korea (via Genie TV)	

=== Former distribution ===
Canadian version

Launch date	Closed	Country
5 November 2001	31 December 2018	Canada

Australian version

Launch date	Closed	Country (via IPTV provider)	Source
24 April 2021	31 October 2024	Australia (via Fetch TV)	
