= BBC NL =

- Logo used since 15 May 2025
- Country: Netherlands
- Broadcast area: Netherlands
- Network: BBC Benelux

Programming
- Languages: Dutch; English
- Picture format: 1080i HDTV (downscaled to 16:9 576i for the SDTV feed)

Ownership
- Owner: BBC Studios
- Sister channels: BBC News

History
- Launched: 16 May 2015; 11 years ago (as BBC First); 15 May 2025; 18 months ago (as BBC NL)
- Former names: BBC First (2015-2025)

Links
- Website: BBCBenelux.com

Availability

Streaming media
- Ziggo GO(Netherlands): ZiggoGO.tv (Europe only)

BBC NL is a Dutch TV-station of BBC Studios with drama and some entertainment. It is a pay television channel which launched in the Netherlands originally as BBC First on 16 May 2015. On 15 May 2025 BBC NL took over from BBC First in the Netherlands. The channel is distributed by BBC Benelux, a division of BBC Studios.

In Belgium, BBC First was available from 4 June 2015, when BBC First became BBC NL in The Netherlands in 2025, BBC First was still shown until 5 May 2026 when the channel became BBC Belgium.

== History ==
BBC First launched in the Netherlands on 16 May 2015, initially exclusively on the KPN IPTV service (Interactieve TV van KPN) on channel 23. The programme mix is specifically for the Netherlands, with more emphasis placed on drama and crime series. All programming is subtitled in Dutch. KPN simultaneously withdrew BBC Three and BBC Four. On 1 July 2016 Ziggo added BBC First to its channel line up.

On 15 May 2025, the channel's Dutch feed rebranded to BBC NL.

== See also ==
- BBC Studios
- International BBC television channels
