= BBC Japan =

Japanese television channel

- Country: Japan
- Broadcast area: Japan

Programming
- Languages: English; Japanese
- Picture format: NTSC 480i (4:3 SDTV)

Ownership
- Owner: BBC Worldwide; Japan Mediarc

History
- Launched: 1 December 2004
- Closed: 30 April 2006

BBC Japan was a short-lived subscription television channel co-owned by BBC Worldwide and SKY PerfecTV! subsidiary Japan Mediarc that was available via satellite in Japan. The channel's aim was to showcase the BBC's programming to the Japanese market, but it suffered from financial issues from its co-owner that led to the channel's closure a year later.

== History ==
The channel was announced by the BBC on 8 October 2004 for a launch on 1 December. The channel launched as planned on that day, broadcast on Sky PerfecTV! satellite channel 110. The channel launched with solid figures, with reports at the BBC citing that the audience was mainly Japanese. On 14 June 2005, the channel was added to Online TV Company's IPTV service.

On 20 March 2006, BBC Worldwide announced that the channel would cease operations in April, citing that financial problems at Japan Mediarc meant they could no longer honour contractual commitments to distribute the network. On 24 April 2006, the closure date of 30 April was announced, and the channel closed as planned on that day.

== Programming ==
Being the Japanese counterpart to BBC Prime, BBC Japan aired programmes normally sourced from BBC Worldwide or the mainstream BBC archives, as well as third-party content from companies like Granada Media. With BBC Japan being a commercial network, programs were edited to fit the time slot, meaning a normal hour-long production would be shortened to 42 minutes on the channel.

Most shows on the channel aired with Japanese subtitles. Shows that were intended for children or for educational purposes aired fully in English, as a learning tool.

- Absolutely Fabulous
- Angelmouse
- Balamory
- Bargain Hunt
- Binka
- Blackadder
- The Catherine Tate Show
- Casualty
- Changing Rooms
- Doctors
- Fawlty Towers
- Friends Like These
- Ground Force
- Holby City
- Keeping Up Appearances
- Miss Marple
- My Family
- Only Fools and Horses
- Parkinson
- Ready Steady Cook
- Red Dwarf
- Shooting Stars
- Sounds of the 60s
- Sounds of the 70s
- Top Gear
- Top of the Pops
- Tweenies
- The Vicar of Dibley
- The Weakest Link
