= BBC HD (international) =

International high-definition television channel

- Broadcast area: Selected cruise ships, maritime industry

Programming
- Picture format: 1080i (HDTV)

Ownership
- Owner: BBC Studios
- Sister channels: BBC Entertainment; BBC Earth; BBC Brit; BBC First; BBC Lifestyle; CBeebies; BBC News

History
- Launched: 2 June 2008; 17 years ago (Australia & New Zealand); 3 December 2008; 17 years ago (Nordic region); 10 December 2008; 17 years ago (Scandinavia); 17 December 2008; 17 years ago (Romania); 24 December 2008; 17 years ago (Latin America); 31 December 2008; 17 years ago (Brazil); 10 January 2017; 9 years ago (Selected cruise ships)
- Closed: 15 November 2009; 16 years ago (Australia & New Zealand); 30 October 2012; 13 years ago (Brazil); 5 January 2016; 10 years ago (Nordic region); 26 October 2018; 7 years ago (Poland); 27 May 2020; 5 years ago (Turkey)
- Replaced by: UKTV HD (Australia); BBC Earth (Latin America); BBC First

Links
- Website: bbchdmaritime.com

BBC HD was launched in 2 June 2008; 17 years ago and is an only selected cruise ships international high-definition television channel owned by BBC Studios. In many countries the channel has been replaced by other BBC Studios operations. At present, the channel is only available in selected cruise ships and within the maritime industry.

It first launched in Australia. An Australian version of BBC HD was broadcast on the Foxtel HD+ service which was made available to subscribers on 2 June 2008 and was officially launched on 22 June 2008. On 15 November 2009 it was replaced on Foxtel HD+ by UKTV HD.

During the first broadcast of BBC World News America, it was announced that BBC America HD would be launched in 2008. However, the HD version did not begin broadcasting until 20 July 2009.

BBC HD started broadcasting to the Scandinavian countries in 2008. A localised Latin American feed started in 2011. In 2012 a Brazilian feed was created, though later that year, the Brazilian feed merged with that for the rest of the region, with separate audio and subtitle channels.

BBC First replaced BBC HD in Poland on 26 October 2018.

== BBC HD Maritime ==
BBC HD was launched on P&O Cruises and Cunard cruise ships and is provided by Global Eagle Entertainment's (GEE) MTN TV network. The channel was launched on 10 January 2017 with the intention of expanding further into the maritime industry. The channel provides programmes in the genres; drama, comedy, factual entertainment, natural history, and documentaries. BBC HD also shows EastEnders, Holby City and Casualty at a similar time to their broadcast in the UK.

== BBC HD Nordics ==
BBC HD was a television channel broadcasting high-definition programming to Sweden, Norway, Finland, Denmark and Iceland. The channel was also included in HD Cable Platform Teledünya in Turkey.

The channel was launched on 3 December 2008 from the Canal Digital platform and YouSee in Denmark. It was the third BBC HD channel overall (after the British BBC HD and BBC HD Australia), and the first in Continental Europe. The launch of BBC HD coincided with the launch of BBC Entertainment, BBC Lifestyle and BBC Knowledge in Scandinavia.

The channel broadcasts round-the-clock and heavily features BBC dramas and natural documentaries such as Bleak House and Planet Earth.

BBC HD ceased broadcasting in the Nordic region on 5 January 2016.

== See also ==
- BBC HD (UK)
