= BBC Nordic =

- Logo used since 2023
- Country: United Kingdom
- Broadcast area: Nordics

Programming
- Language: English
- Picture format: 1080i (16:9 HDTV)

Ownership
- Owner: BBC Studios
- Sister channels: BBC News

History
- Launched: 17 April 2023; 3 years ago
- Replaced: BBC Brit, BBC Earth

Links
- Website: bbcnordic.com

BBC Nordic is an entertainment and documentary subscription television channel, owned and operated by BBC Studios and launched on 17 April 2023. It replaced BBC Brit and BBC Earth in the Nordic countries. A dedicated streaming service, BBC Nordic+, was launched alongside the channel.
