= BBC Food =

British Broadcasting Corporation website and former TV channel

BBC Food is a division of the BBC which controls a recipe website part of BBC Online, an online streaming channel, and a former international commercial television channel focusing on food.

== Website ==
BBC Food
- Website type: Recipe
- Owner: BBC
- Website: bbc.co.uk/food
- Commercial: No
- Launched: 2000

BBC Food is the public service website which publishes recipes from BBC programmes.

The BBC Food website has been running since the year 2000 and is part of BBC Learning. Most of the site's recipes are featured on television programmes, but the site also commissions original recipes to accompany public service campaigns to teach and encourage the public to cook.

BBC Food publishes recipes that will be of use to the broadest possible audience, and refrains from publishing recipes that clearly require restaurant kitchen equipment or the skills of a professional chef.

BBC Food is not related to the monthly magazine and media brand BBC Good Food, which was acquired by Immediate Media Company in 2018.

== Television channel ==
BBC Food
- Broadcast area: Southern Africa and Scandinavia

Ownership
- Owner: BBC Worldwide

History
- Launched: 16 June 2002; 24 years ago
- Closed: 26 December 2008; 17 years ago
- Replaced by: BBC Lifestyle

BBC Food was also the name of the BBC's international commercial television channel focusing solely on food until it was replaced in the television markets in which it was broadcast by BBC Lifestyle. The channel was owned and operated by BBC Worldwide, the BBC's commercial arm.

The channel launched in June 2002 and was available in Southern Africa and parts of Scandinavia. While much of the programming was from the BBC, having been shown on other outlets elsewhere, other content from other providers was included in the scheduling.

Well known chefs who have appeared on the channel with their respective programmes have included:

- Antonio Carluccio
- Sophie Grigson
- Ainsley Harriott
- Ken Hom
- Madhur Jaffrey
- Nigella Lawson
- James Martin
- Jamie Oliver
- Gary Rhodes
- Delia Smith
- Rick Stein
- Antony Worrall Thompson

A similar service operated within the United Kingdom and Ireland called Good Food, owned by Discovery, Inc. It closed on 12 September 2019 after merging its programming with Food Network.

The BBC Food channel was phased out in Africa in September 2008, and in Scandinavia in December 2008. The channel was replaced by the new BBC Lifestyle.

A free streaming service under the name BBC Food was launched in the United States via Pluto TV in 2021.

== See also ==
- BBC Good Food
