= BBC Entertainment =

International television channel

- Broadcast area: Europe; Middle East; Africa; South Asia; Asia Pacific; Latin America

Programming
- Picture format: 1080i HDTV

Ownership
- Owner: BBC
- Parent: BBC Studios
- Sister channels: CBeebies; BBC World News; BBC Lifestyle; BBC Earth; BBC HD; BBC First; BBC Brit

History
- Launched: 1 October 2006; 20 years ago
- Replaced: BBC Prime
- Closed: 1 March 2010; 16 years ago (Italy); 30 November 2012; 13 years ago (India); 1 February 2015; 11 years ago (Poland); 13 April 2015; 11 years ago (Nordic Regions); 1 September 2015; 11 years ago (Africa); 1 October 2015; 11 years ago (Malaysia); 1 January 2016; 10 years ago (Central and Eastern Europe); 1 November 2016; 10 years ago (Hong Kong & Singapore); 10 March 2017; 9 years ago (Taiwan); 13 April 2017; 9 years ago (Latin America); 31 March 2024; 2 years ago
- Replaced by: BBC Brit; BBC Earth (Central and Eastern Europe); BBC First (Hong Kong & Singapore); CBeebies (Taiwan)

Links
- Website: bbcentertainment.com (redirects to bbcstudios.com)

BBC Entertainment was an international television channel that broadcast comedy, drama, light entertainment, reality and children's programming (some regions only) from the BBC, Channel 4 and other UK production houses. The channel broadcast regional versions to suit local demands and replaced BBC Prime in a gradual rollout from 2006 to 2009. It was wholly owned by BBC Studios.

== History ==
The channel was launched in October 2006, replacing BBC Prime in Asian markets such as Singapore, Hong Kong, Thailand and South Korea. On 28 December 2006, it was launched on the platform Astro in Malaysia. The channel was launched in India in May 2007 on the Tata Sky platform and on India online Broadband Public Limited, but ceased broadcasting at the end of November 2012 due to "commercial considerations".

The channel was launched in Poland, on Cyfrowy Polsat, in December 2007, and replaced BBC Prime on DStv in South Africa on 1 September 2008. It was launched together with its sister channels (BBC Knowledge, BBC Lifestyle and BBC HD) in the Nordic countries in November 2008, when it replaced BBC Prime on Canal Digital, Com Hem, Telia Digital-TV and FastTV. The Nordic countries get a separate feed of the channel which differs from that in the rest of Europe. It was also launched in Mexico on the SKY México digital satellite platform in August 2008 in a two-channel deal with Televisa that also included a localized CBeebies, before later extending to other Central and South American countries.

The channel replaced BBC Prime in the rest of Europe and the Middle East & North Africa in November 2009, a move announced in August 2009 that enabled the completion of the rollout of the new brand. In Belgium, the Netherlands and Switzerland, BBC Entertainment is carried alongside BBC One and BBC Two on the Telenet, Ziggo, and Naxoo cable networks.

On 1 December 2009, Astro dropped the channel and replaced it with ITV Choice. On 1 March 2010 in Italy Sky Italia also dropped the channel. In 2010 Kabel Deutschland (Germany) made it a pay-TV channel.

In August 2012, Unifi picked up the channel, thus making the channel available in Malaysia once more after a 3-year hiatus. However Unifi dropped the channel on 1 October 2015 and was replaced by BBC First after 1 year. It ceased broadcasting on 1 January 2016 in CEE, and it was replaced by BBC Earth.

In January 2017, BBC Worldwide announced BBC Entertainment would cease its transmissions in Latin American countries, along with BBC Earth and CBeebies, in April 2017. The shutdown was motivated by a push towards content sales to other linear and OTT platforms.

Finally, BBC First was launched in some Asian regions on 19 March 2016. Singapore Via Starhub TV broadcasts ceased on 29 April 2015, while in Hong Kong, Thailand and Indonesia, broadcasts ceased on 1 January 2017. In Myanmar and Mongolia, broadcasts ceased on 1 March 2018. In Taiwan, broadcasts ceased on 10 March 2017 and were replaced by CBeebies.

The channel shut down its last feed on 31 March 2024, with similar motivations to the decision taken in Latin America.

== Programming ==
This table is not complete

Programme name	Format / Genre	First broadcast	First seen on BBC Entertainment
A Question of Sport	Quiz show	1970–	
Absolutely Fabulous	Sitcom	1992–2012	
After You've Gone	Sitcom	2007–2008	April 2013
Alan Carr: Chatty Man	Comedy chat show	2009–2017	March 2013
Antiques Roadshow	Documentary	1979–	
As Time Goes By	Sitcom	1992–2005	March 2013
Bargain Hunt	Game Show	2000–	
Bedlam	Supernatural drama	2011–2012	
Being Erica	Comedy drama	2009–2011	May 2013
Big Barn Farm	Children's TV	2008–	
Blue Peter	Children's TV	1958–	April 2016
Casualty	Medical drama	1986–	April 2013
Coast	Travel	2005-2021	December 2012
Come Dine with Me	Cooking	2005–	
Doctors	Soap opera	2000–	March 2013
Doctor Who	Sci-fi drama	1963–89; 2005–	February 2013
Dragons Den	Entrepreneurial reality TV	2005–	
EastEnders	Soap opera	1985–	February 2013
Extreme Makeover: Home Edition	Reality TV	2003–2012	
Fawlty Towers	Sitcom	1975–1979	May 2015
Full Circle Michael Palin	Travel documentary	1997	March 2013
The Graham Norton Show	Comedy	2007–	October 2016
Grandpa in My Pocket	Children's TV comedy	2009–2014	
Holby City	Medical drama	1999–2022	
Humf	Children's TV	2009–11	
Hustle	Drama	2004–2012	
Ideal	Comedy drama	2005–2011	March 2013
Lark Rise to Candleford	Period drama	2008–2011	April 2013
Lead balloon	comedy	2007–2011	March 2013
Live at the Apollo	Standup comedy	2004–	March 2013
Luther	Psychological crime drama	2010–2011	March 2013
Masterchef (UK)	Cooking	2005–	March 2013
Merlin	Drama	2008–2012	September 2014
Monarch of the Glen	Drama	2000–2005	March 2013
Monarchy: The Royal Family at Work	Documentary	2007	
My Family	Sitcom	2000–2011	February 2013
New Tricks	Crime drama	2003–	March 2013
Ocean Giants	Natural history	2011	
Of Better or Worse	Drama sitcom	2005–2019	May 2013
One Foot in the Grave	Sitcom	1990–2000	November 2012
Orphan Black	Drama	2013–2017	
Penelope K, by the way	Children's TV	2010–2012	
Sahara with Michael Palin	Travel documentary	2005	May 2013
The Secret Millionaire	Reality TV	2006–	May 2013
Silk	Legal crime drama	2011–	May 2013
Smart sharks	Natural history	2003	
South Pacific	Nature documentary	2009	
Spooks	Drama	2002–2011	May 2013
Still Open All Hours	Comedy	2013–2019	March 2024
Strictly Come Dancing	Talent show	2004–	October 2016
Top Gear	Motoring/Entertainment	2002–2022	
Twenty Twelve	Comedy	2011–2012	November 2012
Ty's Great British Adventure	Reality TV	2008–2010	
The Underground	Sketch comedy	2006	
The Voice UK	Talent show	2012–	May 2016
Waking the Dead	Police procedural drama	2000–2011	February 2013
Walking with Dinosaurs	Documentary	1999	
Walk on the Wild Side	Comedy	2009–	April 2013
Waybuloo	Children's TV	2009–2012	
Weakest Link	Game show	2000–2012; 2017; 2021–	January 2013
Would I Lie to You?	Comedy	2007–	October 2016
Waterloo Road	Drama	2006–2015; 2023–	
Yes Minister	Political satire	1980–1984	

== See also ==
- BBC America
- BBC Canada
- BBC Earth
- BBC First
- BBC HD (international)
- BBC Knowledge
- BBC Lifestyle
- BBC World News
- CBeebies
