= BBC Prime =

Former television station

- Country: United Kingdom
- Broadcast area: Europe, Middle East, Africa, South Asia and Asia Pacific

Programming
- Picture format: 576i (4:3/16:9 SDTV)

Ownership
- Owner: BBC

History
- Launched: 30 January 1995; 31 years ago
- Replaced: BBC World Service Television
- Closed: 11 November 2009; 16 years ago
- Replaced by: BBC Entertainment

Links
- Website: bbcentertainment.com (redirects to bbcstudios.com)

BBC Prime was the BBC's general entertainment TV channel in Europe, the Middle East, Africa, South Asia and Asia-Pacific from 30 January 1995 until 11 November 2009.

The network resulted from the division of BBC World Service Television (1991–1995) into two services: BBC Prime and BBC World (now BBC News). On 11 November 2009, BBC Prime was replaced by BBC Entertainment. It provided entertainment programming coming in from the BBC Worldwide back catalogue, though until 1998, through European Channel Management, it had access to the Thames Television catalogue as well, as Pearson was one of its backers. It also had a CBBC block (replaced with a CBeebies block in 2006).

Initially only available in Europe, the channel expanded to cover the Middle East and Africa in 1999 and Asia in 2004. Between 2006 and 2009, the BBC Prime branding was phased out in favour of BBC Entertainment.

== Launch ==
BBC Prime launched at 19:00 GMT on Thursday, 26 January 1995, when BBC World Service Television was split into two stations:

- BBC World: a 24-hour English, free-to-air international news channel, launched on 26 January 1995.
- BBC Prime: a 24-hour English, subscription-based lifestyle, variety, and entertainment channel, launched on 30 January 1995.

The change was part of a new BBC strategy for Europe, in which the former service was to be split and given over to European Channel Management, the joint venture created with Pearson. The goal was to reach 10 million households in Europe by year-end 1995; the existing service reached 2.3 million households. 75 per cent of the output was drawn from the BBC, while the remaining 25 per cent came from Thames.

BBC Prime broadcast the Princess of Wales's interview with Panorama on 24 November 1995, simulcasting with BBC One and BBC World.

In 1996, the channel was to be joined by two further services, BBC Learning and a nature channel. In November, the channel launched on the DF1 platform in Germany and Austria via a deal with Kirch Media. A deal was also signed with the French satellite platforms Canalsatellite Numérique and TPS.

On 4 March 1999, BBC Prime launched in sub-Saharan Africa on the DStv platform.

The channel was removed from HOT in Israel at the end of 2006, replaced by ethnic channels for the Ethiopian (IETV) and Georgian (GTV) diasporas.

== Programming ==
The channel broadcast drama, comedy, and lifestyle programmes, repeated on a monthly basis. Following the 2000 rebrand, it allocated six hours daily to educational programmes from BBC Learning, shown between 01:00 and 07:00 CET. It also included a children’s strand branded as CBBC on BBC Prime.

When it first launched, BBC Prime carried programming from Thames Television due to a joint venture between BBC Worldwide, Pearson, and Cox Communications. The venture was dissolved in 1998 when the BBC became sole owner.

BBC Prime explained its use of older programmes: “For the majority of our viewers... this is the first chance to see these programmes.”

== Funding ==
BBC Prime was funded by subscription and advertising, unlike the BBC’s domestic channels. It was not available in the UK.

== Presentation ==
BBC Prime's first ident consisted of five shining diamonds on a black background.

After the BBC’s 1997 rebrand, BBC Prime introduced new idents designed by Martin Lambie-Nairn.

On 4 December 2000, BBC Prime rebranded again with the “Festival” idents.

The final rebrand took place on 23 July 2006.

== Availability ==
The channel was available in many regions via satellite and cable:

- In the Netherlands and Belgium, it was available on cable.
- It was available on DTT in the Netherlands and Malta.
- In Gibraltar, GBC relayed BBC Prime on VHF and UHF channels.
- In Turkey, it was available on Türksat Cable TV and Digiturk.
- In Italy, it was available on SKY Italia.
- In MENA, it was available on the Orbit Network Bahrain.
- In South Africa, it launched on DStv on 4 March 1999.
- The Asia service launched on 1 December 2004.

BBC Prime carried subtitles in multiple European and Asian languages.

A similar channel, BBC Japan, launched on 1 December 2004 but closed on 30 April 2006.

== Replacement ==
In September 2006, it was announced that BBC Prime would be replaced by BBC Entertainment.

The transition began with the Asian services on 6 October 2006, followed by South Africa on 1 September 2008. BBC Prime was fully replaced on 11 November 2009.
