= BBC Studios =

British production company

BBC Studios Limited
- Logo used since 2021
- Formerly: FFW 1987 Limited (June–August 2002); BBC Ventures Group Limited (August 2002–April 2018); BBC Studios Group Limited (April–October 2018)
- Type: Subsidiary
- Industry: Television production Film production
- Predecessor: BBC Worldwide
- Founded: 1987 (FFW 1987 Limited); August 2002; 24 years ago (as BBC Ventures Group Limited); 27 February 2018; 8 years ago (as BBC Studios)
- Headquarters: Television Centre, London, England
- Area served: Worldwide
- Key people: Tom Fussell (CEO)
- Brands: BBC Earth
- Revenue: ▲£2.7 billion (2022/23)
- Net income: ▲£240 million (2022/23)
- Total equity: £166.8 million (2021)
- Parent: BBC
- Divisions: BBC Studios Productions; BBC Studios Home Entertainment; BBC Studios ScriptWorks; BBC Studios TalentWorks; BBC News (overseas)
- Subsidiaries: BBC First; BBC NL; BBC Nordic; BBC UKTV; BBC Lifestyle; BBC HD; BBC Kids; BBC Drama; BBC Select (streaming service); BritBox; UKTV; Lookout Point TV; Clerkenwell Films; Demon Music Group; BritBox International; Baby Cow Productions; BBC Studios Africa; BBC Studios Australia; BBC Studios Canada; BBC Studios France; BBC Studios Germany Productions; BBC Worldwide Holdings; BBC Studios India; BBC Studios Singapore; BBC Studios Intermediadora de Programadora Estangeira; BBC Studios Japan; BBC Studios Los Angeles Productions; BBC Studios Mexico; BBC Studios Polska; BBC Studios Productions Nordics; Brutal Media; Firebird Pictures; House Productions; Moonage Pictures; Rapid Blue; Sid Gentle Films; Voltage TV; Werner Film Productions
- Website: bbcstudios.com

BBC Studios Limited is a British media company. It is a commercial subsidiary of the BBC that was formed in April 2018 through the merger of the BBC's commercial production arm and the BBC's commercial international distribution arm, BBC Worldwide. BBC Studios creates, develops, produces, distributes, broadcasts, finances and sells content around the world, returning around £200 million to the BBC annually in dividends and content investment.

== Overview ==
BBC Studios Productions brings together the majority of BBC Television's former in-house production departments: Factual, Drama, Comedy (both combined as Scripted in the new division), Entertainment, and Music & Events. BBC Children's production is set to move into BBC Studios Productions from April 2022 to increase the potential of taking British children's content to the wider global market, along with BBC Three's in-house production team, which is joining from April 2021.

BBC News and BBC Radio remain separate internal production divisions in the BBC, and the rest of the former BBC Television division (channels and genre commissioning, including BBC Sport and BBC iPlayer) are part of the BBC Content division.

The BBC Studios production division was formed in 2016 and launched as a commercial entity in 2017, enabling it to produce programming for other broadcasters and services to generate profit to return to the BBC to supplement licence fee income. In exchange, the BBC agreed to place production of much of its non-news programmes to tender, allowing third-party independents to compete with BBC Studios on bids to produce them.

The merger of BBC Studios and BBC Worldwide in 2018 brought the company in line with other major multinational studio conglomerates.

BBC Studios Productions was the UK's most-commissioned creator of new content in 2019, with 77 new commissions from the BBC and third parties. It achieved 73 awards and 202 nominations in 2019/2020.

BBC Studios represents formats and programmes made by hundreds of independent producers as well as its own production teams, and returned £176m to the independent sector in 2018/2019.

The company is on track to meet its five-year target of returning £1.2bn to the BBC by 2021/2022. BBC Studios has committed to growing this total by a further 30% to a new target of £1.5bn in the five years from 2022/2023.

== History ==
BBC Studios Ltd. as a production company was first registered on 27 February 2015. In September 2015, the BBC's general director Tony Hall announced a proposal to split the BBC's in-house production units for non-news television programming into a separate BBC Studios division, which would eventually, with BBC Trust approval as part of the next revision to the BBC's charter, be spun-out as a for-profit subsidiary of the BBC. This proposal would allow the BBC's units to produce programmes for other broadcasters and digital outlets (which could be done in conjunction with its international distribution arm BBC Worldwide) in addition to the BBC's publicly funded properties. As a for-profit company, BBC Studios would be allowed to pay higher wages to its executives and talent, and no longer face scrutiny over them as it did as a public entity. The proposal was described by The Guardian as being "one of the biggest changes to the BBC in its 93-year history".

The proposal attracted criticism from independent studios, who felt that it would result in the formation of a "super-indie" that would unduly benefit from "guaranteed" programme commissions from the BBC. As part of the split, the BBC planned to tender its programmes, so that independent producers and BBC Studios could bid for the rights to produce its non-news programming, outside of top shows (such as Doctor Who) assigned to BBC Studios. The re-organisation and formation of BBC Studios as a division of the BBC was completed in April 2016. In September 2016, the BBC announced that it would tender its non-news programmes over the next 11 years, beginning with programmes such as A Question of Sport, Holby City and Songs of Praise.

In October 2016, the BBC announced that it planned to lay off 300 employees from the division seen as redundant. In December 2016, BBC Studios announced that it had reached an agreement with Producers Alliance for Cinema and Television (PACT) in regards to the tendering plan, stating that it would tender at least 40% of the "in-house guarantee" within two years of approval of the transition. The BBC Trust subsequently approved the creation of BBC Studios as a commercial subsidiary, with the process expected to be completed in April 2017.

On 29 November 2017, the BBC announced that BBC Worldwide would be merged into BBC Studios effective 1 April 2018. The BBC stated that by handling both the production and sales of its programming within one unit, it would improve efficiency and be in line with the "global norms" of other major international media companies. Technically, BBC Ventures Group Ltd. (Note: Originally registered as FFW 1987 Ltd. on 18 June 2002, renamed as BBC Ventures Group Ltd. on 15 August 2002.) was renamed BBC Studios Group Ltd. on 3 April 2018, and then BBC Studios Ltd. 1 October 2018; also in October, the production company established in 2015 was renamed BBC Studios Productions Ltd., and so did BBC Worldwide Ltd., which was renamed BBC Studios Distribution Ltd.

In February 2018 two months before BBC Studios and BBC Worldwide merged, BBC Studios established its in-house Australian production division entitled BBC Studios Australia to expand its local content in the region, the new Australian production division would handle partnerships & would produce original scripted & unscripted projects and would also produce local adaptations BBC's formats in Australia with BBC Studios' MD, Production and COO, Anna Mallett and BBC Worldwide ANZ's MD Jon Penn would lead BBC Studios' new Australian division which began two months later in April of that year as BBC Studios Australia would create ANZ executive management team with Stargazing Live 2 would be the first production made by the new division.

In February 2019, BBC Studios had announced that they've taken a 25% minority stake in the new independent drama production company founded by former BBC executives Elizabeth Kilgarriff and Craig Holleworth which was named Firebird Pictures and signed an international distribution deal to distribute Firebird's programmes. Three years later in October 2022, BBC Studios announce that they had taken full control of independent drama production label Firebird Pictures by acquiring the remaining stake in the indie outfit and placed Firebird Pictures under their subsidiaries, marking Firebird Pictures a subsidiary of BBC Studios.

In April 2019, BBC Studios announced various agreements with Discovery, Inc.; the companies agreed to break apart their UKTV joint venture, with Discovery (which had acquired a stake in UKTV after its purchase of Scripps Networks Interactive) acquiring the BBC's stake in UKTV's lifestyle channels, and BBC Studios likewise acquiring Discovery's stakes in UKTV's entertainment channels and the video on-demand service UKTV Play. In addition, Discovery announced a 10-year agreement with the BBC's Natural History Unit to acquire exclusive subscription video-on-demand rights to its content worldwide (which would be incorporated into a forthcoming global streaming brand), and co-fund a development team. Discovery had previously served as the Natural History's Unit U.S. partner until 2013.

In August 2019, BBC Studios announced a long-term deal with WarnerMedia's upcoming HBO Max for streaming rights to past seasons of top BBC programmes such as Doctor Who, The Honourable Woman, Luther, and Top Gear. In January 2020, it also sold second-window streaming rights to 14 series to CW Seed (a video on-demand platform operated by The CW, a television network co-owned by WarnerMedia).

In February 2021, BBC Studios launched a new streaming brand in North America known as BBC Select, dedicated to factual content. On 22 February 2021, BBC Studios signed a first-look deal with Gobstopper Group.

In March 2021, it was announced that the BBC Children's Productions and BBC Global News units would also be transferred into BBC Studios. With the change, BBC Studios will handle international distribution and advertising sales for BBC World News, while the public service BBC News operation will assume editorial control of the channel. More recently, the studio had set up a development deal with EbonyLife Media, which was affiliated with Sony Pictures Television, headed by Mo Abudu.

In August 2022, it was revealed that BBC Studios planned to launch an international newsletter business, initially focusing on Canada and the US, the BBC's second largest non-UK news market behind India.

In October 2022, BBC Studios who inherited a minority stake in London-based unscripted production company Curve Media following its merger with BBC Worldwide back in 2018 had sold their minority stake in unscripted production company behind Salvage Hunters Curve Media to German production and financial company Night Train Media with Curve Media founders Camilla Lewis and Rob Carey continued to led the company under its new parent company Night Train Media.

In November 2022, BBC Studios acquired London-based unscripted production company behind 'Inside the Factory' Voltage TV to expand its unscripted production portfolio with BBC Studios taken over Channel 4's stake in the unscripted production firm. Thus, Voltage TV became a subsidiary of BBC Studios with Sanjay Singhal and Steve Nam continued leading Voltage TV under their new parent with BBC Studios started distributing Voltage TV's future productions.

In June 2023, BBC Studios announced the acquisition of Copenhagen-based Scandinavian production company STV (Note: Not to be confused with Scotland's STV Group) to further expand its international production output and to create a significant regional production base, expanding BBC Studios' Scandinavian production activities with them rebranding the Copenhagen-based production company UTV as a division of BBC Studios changed its name to BBC Studios Nordic Productions.

In October 2023, press reports confirmed that BBC Studios had reached a multi-million pound financial settlement to compensate Top Gear presenter Freddie Flintoff for the injuries he sustained in a car crash when filming a Top Gear episode in December 2022.

One month later, on 9 November of that year, BBC Studios launched its Liverpool and London-based scripted production label called River Pictures with BBC Studios executives Andrew Morrissey and Michael Parke leading BBC Studios' new scripted production subsidiary.

In March 2024, BBC Studios expanded its Australian productions operations by announcing that they've acquired Melbourne-based Australian live-action production powerhouse company Werner Film Productions based and placed the acquired company under their Australian division BBC Studios Productions Australia expanding their operations in Australia.

On August 28, 2025, BBC Studios under its national production arm BBC Studios Productions expanded its high-end scripted business by launching its fiction production division based in London, Liverpool and Glasgow called BBC Studios Fiction and had appointed Josh Cole heading the new fiction production division BBC Studios as head of fiction & comedy with River Pictures executives Michael Parke and Andrew Morrissey joining the new fiction division as managing directors.

In November 2025, BBC Studios had merged its Australian & New Zealand media production & streaming operations with its Asian media production & streaming operations into one new Asia-Pacific streaming operation unit under BBC Studios ANZ alum Robi Stanton which she will lead the newly merged APAC streaming operations unit as president while BBC Studios' Australian production operation was interrogated into the merged unit and continued to be led by Kylie Washington.

== Assets and brands ==
=== Television channels ===
- BBC Brit (Poland)
- BBC Earth
  - BBC Earth (Canada; Under licence)
  - Sony BBC Earth (India; joint venture with Sony)
- BBC Entertainment
- BBC First
  - BBC First (Australia)
  - BBC First (Canada; Under licence)
- BBC HD
- BBC Kids
- BBC Lifestyle
- BBC Belgium (Belgium)
- BBC NL (Netherlands)
- BBC Nordic
- BBC UKTV (Australia and New Zealand)
- CBeebies
- CTV Wild Channel (Note: Formerly Animal Planet; programming moved to Rogers Sports & Media's platforms from 2025) (Canada; joint venture with CTV Specialty Television (Note: An joint venture between Bell Media and ESPN, Inc.) and Warner Bros. Discovery)
- UKTV
  - U&Alibi
  - U&Dave
  - U&Drama
  - U&Eden
  - U&Gold
  - U&W
  - U&Yesterday

=== International distribution only ===
- BBC News – owned by BBC Global News and operated by BBC News
  - BBC News North America
  - BBC News Africa
  - BBC News South America
  - BBC News Europe (Except UK & Ireland)
  - BBC News Middle East
  - BBC News South Asia
  - BBC News Asia
  - BBC News Australia
- CBeebies

=== Brands ===
- BBC Shop - Online retailer operating in the US & Canada only, selling BBC products. UK physical store closed in 2016 & BBC Store closed in 2017, although Studios retain Doctor Who and Top Gear branded online shops.
- BBC Motion Gallery - Licensing footage from the BBC Archives
- BBC Studios Home Entertainment - Home video label. Formerly known as 2 | entertain.
- Demon Music Group - Record label.
- UKTV - UK digital TV broadcaster.
- BBC Player (not to be confused with BBC iPlayer) - A video on demand subscription service in Singapore and Malaysia.
- Rapid Blue - Division of BBC Studios responsible for production in South Africa.
- BBC Active (joint venture with Pearson PLC) - The brand publishes educational material.
- Licences the publishing of magazine titles to the Immediate Media Company. The titles were formerly published in-house by BBC Magazines.
- Licences audio content to Penguin Random House UK for global sales and distribution. Titles were previously published in-house by BBC Radio Collection and BBC Audiobooks and later by AudioGO, in which BBC Studios held a 15% stake.
- BBC Books (joint venture with Penguin Random House UK)
  - BBC Children's Books (joint venture with Penguin Random House UK)
- BBC Select

=== Label investments ===
BBC Studios has built up a stake in a variety of different production companies.

- 72 Films (with Fremantle, David Glover and Mark Raphael; 15%)
- Amazing Productions (with George Clarke, 25%)
- Baby Cow Productions (with Steve Coogan; 73%)
- Brutal Media
- Burning Bright Productions (25%)
- Clerkenwell Films (100% as of 19 January 2021)
- Cuba Pictures (10%, via Original Talent Ltd)
- Curve Media (with Rob Carey and Camilla Lewis; 25%)
- Expectation Entertainment (24.9%)
- Firebird Pictures (100% as of 5 October 2022)
- House Productions (100% as of 14 December 2021)
- Lookout Point TV (100% as of 5 July 2018)
- Mighty Productions (with Lynn Sutcliffe and Hugh Rycroft)
- Moonage Pictures
- Sid Gentle Films Ltd. (100% as of 17 October 2022)
- VAL (Various Artists Limited) (with Sam Bain, Jesse Armstrong, Phil Clarke and Roberto Troni; 20%)
- Werner Film Productions

== BBC Records ==
BBC Records Logo

BBC Records was a division of the BBC founded in 1967 to commercially exploit the corporation's output for radio and television for both educational and domestic use. In the 1990s licensing and marketing of the BBC's recorded output become the responsibility of BBC Worldwide (formerly BBC Enterprises), and the corporation ceased the direct release of recorded material, instead licensing its products to other companies. BBC Worldwide was merged into BBC Studios from 2018, which now licenses the use of the BBC logo on commercial recordings.

== BritBox ==
Logo used (except UK) as of October 2022 with the old BBC logo

BritBox is an over-the-top subscription video on-demand brand that includes original programming commissioned or acquired by the company, and third-party content licensed from other UK channels such as BBC, ITV, Channel 4 and Channel 5. The service was announced by BBC Worldwide and ITV plc as a joint venture in 2016 and launched in 2017 in North America; the international service remains a joint venture of BBC Studios and ITV plc.

A separately managed UK version of the service launched in 2019 but is now a fully owned subsidiary of ITV, after they announced in 2022 that they had bought out the BBC and its other partners with the intention of integrating the service with ITVX.
