= BBC HD =

High-definition television channel

- Logo used from 2008 to 2013

Programming
- Picture format: 1080i HDTV; 3D (special broadcasts)

Ownership
- Owner: BBC
- Sister channels: BBC One; BBC Two; BBC Three; BBC Four; BBC News; BBC Parliament; CBBC; CBeebies

History
- Launched: 15 May 2006; 20 years ago
- Closed: 25 March 2013; 13 years ago
- Replaced by: BBC Two HD

Links
- Website: bbc.co.uk/bbchd

Availability (at time of closure)

Terrestrial
- Freeview: Channel 102

BBC HD was a high-definition television channel owned by the BBC. The channel was initially run as a trial from 15 May 2006 until becoming a full service on 1 December 2007 before its discontinuation on 25 March 2013. It broadcast only during the afternoon and evening and only broadcast material shot in high definition, either in a simulcast with another channel or by inserting a repeat of an HD programme.

The channel featured a mix of programmes from the channels BBC One, BBC Two, BBC Three, BBC Four, CBBC and CBeebies, although earlier and later in its existence programmes from BBC One and BBC Two were given priority. All programmes that aired on the UK version of the channel were produced in high definition. The channel also carried coverage of sport and music events, with some coverage being broadcast in experimental formats such as 3D television.

The channel closed for the final time at 01:20 am on the night of Monday 25 March 2013, and was replaced with BBC Two HD the following day on Tuesday 26 March, partly as a result of budget cuts affecting the entire corporation. New HD versions of the existing BBC channels would launch on 10 December 2013.

== History ==
=== Trial ===
BBC HD began broadcasting on 15 May 2006 as a trial station to test the possibility and technical practicality of broadcasting programmes in HD. The first programme to be broadcast that was specifically made for HD was natural history programme Planet Earth, which was shown on 27 May 2006. The trial in 450 businesses and homes was set to last until June 2007; however, just before this deadline, the BBC Trust began a Public Value Test of the service to determine whether, as the BBC argued, the service was of worth to the general public. As a result, the HD service was extended throughout the testing period, which began on 21 May. The result of the test, announced on 19 November, was that they had approved the BBC Executive's high definition television proposals to allow the launch of UK's first free-to-air, mixed-genre public service HD channel.

=== Official launch ===
The channel officially launched on 1 December 2007, although much of the programme makeup and format of the broadcasts remained the same from the trial. This new channel was nationwide and platform neutral, in that it was carried by all providers as a free to air channel. This channel, as recommended by the BBC Trust's Public Value Test, broadcast only for around nine hours a day during prime time and only showed programmes made specifically for HD. The channel would air programmes from across the BBC channels.

This arrangement continued until 2010, when the increase in HD content saw several changes. 2010 had been the BBC's internal deadline for the majority of new content to be produced in HD and as a result the broadcast space was fast running out. As a result, on 3 November 2010, BBC One HD launched as a separate simulcast of the channel and at approximately the same time, BBC HD's broadcast hours were extended to twelve hours a day. Due to BBC One HD's launch, BBC HD on Virgin Media moved from channel 108 to channel 187. The channel now catered for the programming of the BBC's channels other than BBC One.

From 2011, the channel also began to experiment with showing select programmes in 3D. The first such broadcasts were the live men's and women's finals of the 2011 Wimbledon Championships and continued with the broadcast of that year's Strictly Come Dancing final in December. 2012 saw one of the most ambitious levels of 3D coverage with the BBC screening the opening and closing ceremonies and the men's 100m final of the 2012 Summer Olympics including a daily highlights programme in 3D. In addition to this, the channel also broadcast in 3D the men's and women's finals of the 2012 Wimbledon Championships, the natural history programme Planet Dinosaur Ultimate Killers in August, the second half of the Last Night of the Proms on 8 September 2012, the adaptation of Mr Stink on 23 December 2012 and Killer Dinosaurs and the Royal Christmas Message on 25 December.

=== Closure ===
Initial reports of the closure of the channel began to surface in July 2011 when Broadcast magazine claimed that the BBC HD would become more of a simulcast of BBC Two when Danielle Nagler, head of HD and 3D at the BBC, left the corporation in September. Although this was later disproved, it caused speculation about the channel's future given that the new head of the channel was Janice Hadlow, controller of BBC Two.

The channel's future was again called into question following the BBC's Delivering Quality First review of the corporation's spending. The review sought cost-cutting measures following the government settlement that froze the license fee, reducing the BBC's income, and saw the corporation take on additional responsibility for funding some services. The review recommended that BBC HD should close and be replaced with a simulcast of BBC Two. The proposals were approved by the BBC Trust in May 2012 and subsequently, BBC Two HD launched on 26 March 2013, replacing BBC HD; which was closed the night before.

The "BBC HD" name remains in use for a channel available to the maritime industry, including on select cruise ships.

== Broadcast ==
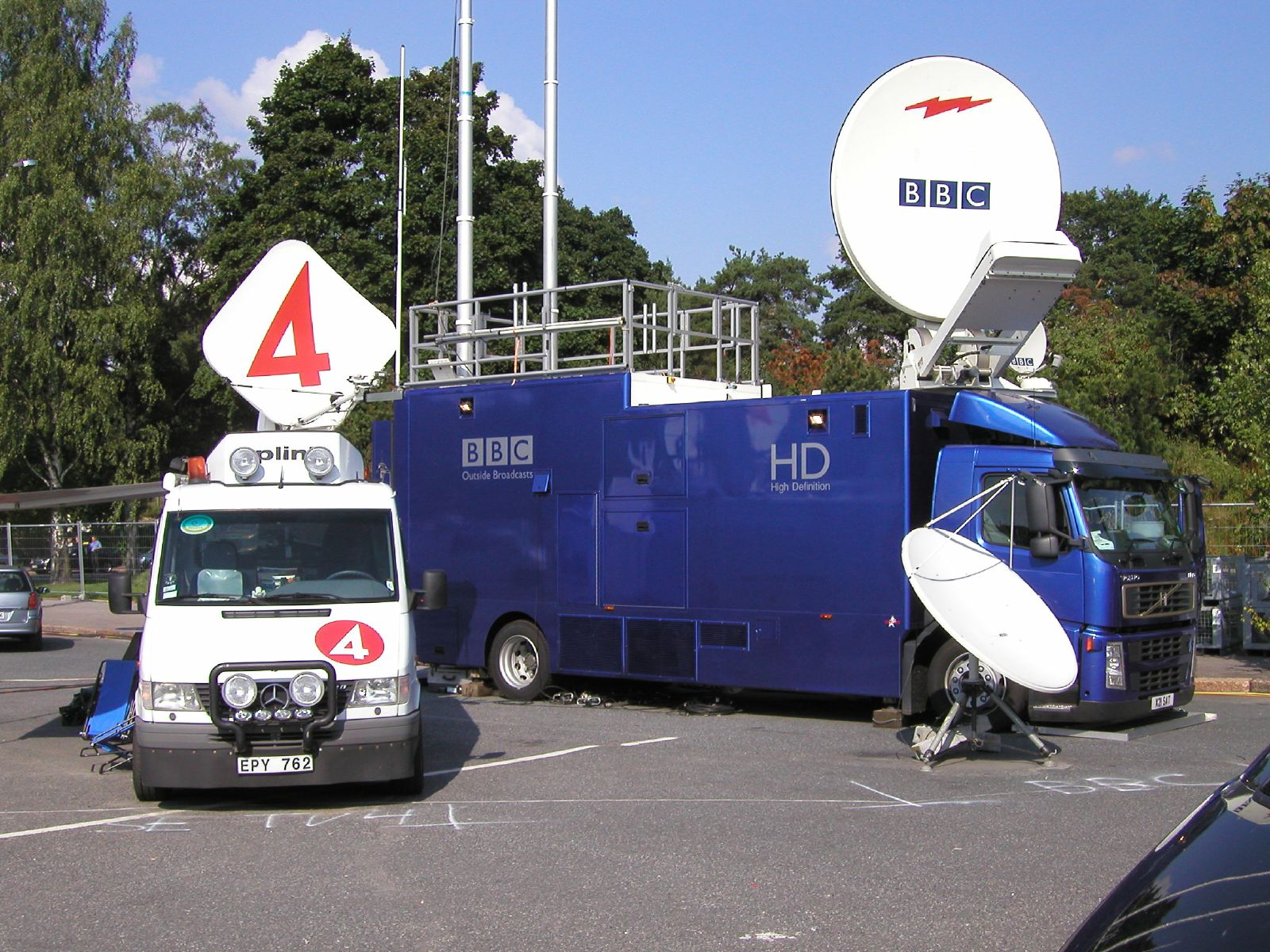
A BBC High Definition Outside Broadcast van at the 2005 World Athletics Championships, Helsinki.

=== Availability ===
At the time of the official launch, BBC HD was available universally on all HD broadcasters as a free-to-air station. Satellite viewers could watch the channel on Freesat or Sky, who received their signal from the Astra 1N satellite. The channel was also available to cable television customers through Virgin Media's basic package. The service was also carried on digital terrestrial television in London, from Crystal Palace, until May 2007 as part of the channel's trial and gradually made available nationwide on a region-by-region basis from 2 December 2009.

The service expanded into the Republic of Ireland with the channel's carriage on UPC Ireland's Digital+ HD service from 5 August 2009 and on the Sky Ireland platform from 27 April 2010.

=== Technical specifications ===
The channel was broadcast at a display resolution of 1440 by 1080i, which despite being less than the usual 1920 by 1080 resolution used for HD broadcasts was still acceptable to the European Broadcasting Union (EBU) of which the BBC is a member. But after years of pressure from bloggers and tech experts alike, the BBC finally relented and switched BBC HD to full 1920 resolution for all broadcasts, not just when 3D was being broadcast. The channel encoded in H.264/MPEG-4 AVC for satellite and terrestrial broadcasts and in MPEG-2 for cable transmissions.

Over time, changes were made to the way that the channel is broadcast or received. Following the launch of BBC One HD on 3 November 2010, both the new channel and BBC HD were statistically multiplexed on the satellite feeds. Equally, on 6 June 2011, the satellite transponder carrying BBC One HD and BBC HD was upgraded to DVB-S2. In addition to the satellite changes, alterations were made in March 2011 for the Freeview HD encoders to change automatically between 1080i at 50 fields per second to 1080p at 25 frames per second depending on the programme's GOP. Unfortunately some receivers did not handle the transitions between these modes well, resulting in sound and picture disruption.

==== 2009-2010 bitrate drop ====
On 5 August 2009, the channel's satellite encoders on the Astra 2D satellite were replaced by newer models. A side effect of this change was a drop in bitrate from 16 megabits per second (Mb/s) to 9.7 Mbit/s, leading to a large number of complaints to the BBC. The problem only occurred on the satellite platforms as the cable versions were encoded by the provider themselves and so remained at 17 Mbit/s while the later launched terrestrial version was statistically multiplexed between 3 Mbit/s and 17 Mbit/s. Further anger ensued that the new satellite bitrate fell below the recommendations set out by the European Broadcasting Union (EBU), of which the BBC is a member. These recommend a minimum of 12 Mbit/s, but as Andy Quested, principal technologist at the BBC stated, the current technology gave a consistent reliable output of 8-10 Mbit/s which would soon become the requirements with improved technology.

Within four months of the change, by mid December, the number of complaints on this issue to the BBC reached 130 of which one was passed straight to the BBC Trust. At around the same time a petition was added to the official Number10 website in December 2009, petitioning then Prime Minister Gordon Brown to bring the BBC into line with the EBU standards. The petition was sparked by the BBC's insistence that there was no problem with the bit rate. In addition, tests run by consumer publication Which?, published in December 2009, found no significant decline in picture quality on the BBC HD channel, labelling the difference in picture quality between the new and old BBC HD broadcasts as "insignificant". Meanwhile, the international version of BBC HD continued to broadcast on satellite at the higher bitrate and screen resolution. The following year, on 30 April 2010, a delegation of viewers who had complained met with Andy Quested and Danielle Nagler to argue that BBC HD was failing to "deliver a very high quality technical service to viewers, by adhering to, or seeking to exceed, industry standards for picture resolution". The visitors took part in an evaluation of the new and old encoder's picture quality (by an ITU R500 test) and the results demonstrated that the new encoder, at much reduced bit rate, was not only "as good as" but actually much better than the old.

The issue was resolved when, on 3 June 2010, the BBC introduced variable bitrate encoding and fixed previous problems with mixing, fading and noise in pictures. The variable bitrate encoding allowed the channel to maintain the same average bandwidth while allowing an increase in bitrate for more demanding programme scenes such as fast movement. Equally the fixes for mixing and fading treated specific problems with changing scenes, while a configuration change for 'noisy' video means the BBC no longer needed to use noise reduction techniques that often reduced the overall picture quality. The changes were welcomed by campaigners.

==== 3D broadcasts ====
Whenever the BBC has broadcast programmes or events in 3D, there were other technical changes made to the channel that accompanied it. The BBC's first broadcast of the Wimbledon finals in 2011 saw the screen resolution increased from the usual 1440 by 1080 to 1920 by 1080 between 13 June and 6 July. Equally, the same occurred for the 2011 Strictly Come Dancing final when the resolution was changed between 8 December 2011 and 5 January 2012. An increase to 1920 horizontal resolution was again observed on 30 May 2012 as part of the preparations of 2012's 3D broadcasts.

=== Presentation ===
The BBC HD channel only ever ran at its peak for an average of twelve hours a day, usually from mid afternoon, and was only ever allowed to expand beyond these hours for coverage of significant sporting events. When off air, the channel would broadcast a looped series of clips identified as the BBC HD Preview. These were of extended trailers and extracts for upcoming programmes on the channel separated by the channel's idents. These segments were also notable in their hourly broadcasts of the HD testcard, nicknamed Test Card X, overlaid with a BLITS audio test signal which allowed users to test and adjust their picture quality and position and the quality of their surround sound respectively. Equally, an audio visual synchronization animation was also broadcast hourly.

The channel's presentation was unique from the other BBC channels and used its own style of programme idents and trailers. The channel originally used an ident that featured a diamond shape falling backwards down a stream before exploding to several more diamond shapes before taking its place back where it started to be back-lit over an announcement. These were used until 2009 when the presentation changed to a style featuring an ordinary scene which would become extraordinary when viewed through a rotating diamond shape. An example of this was a cat chasing pigeons that was seen as a lion when looked through the diamond shape. Original programme trailers and slides used the back-lit diamond shape as a base, while the 2009 versions used bright colours and textures inspired from the idents, for example the picnic blanket from the cat ident.

== Programming ==
The channel's programmes were sourced from every BBC channel and were of mixed genres. The channel would only broadcast productions made in high definition and would not upscale any programmes from standard definition for use on the channel - in contrast to the BBC One HD and BBC Two HD simulcast services. Any individual programme could contain up to 25 per cent non-HD material converted from SD, for example archive shots in a documentary. Some high definition recording formats like HDV as well as some film formats like 16 mm are considered by BBC to be "non-HD". As many of the BBC's top productions were made in HD from soon after the channel launched, many of these productions were broadcast on the station at some point.

=== Live events ===
The channel had broadcast several live and significant events in HD. Sporting events include the Wimbledon Tennis Championships, the Australian Open and French Open from 2009, the FIFA World Cup 2006 and 2010, the Euro 2008 Championships, the US Masters golf, Open Golf, England football internationals, action from the FA Cup and Six Nations rugby. The channel also broadcast the 2008 Summer Olympics and Paralympics, the 2010 Winter Olympics and the 2012 Summer Olympics. For the latter, the channel simulcast BBC Three's Olympic coverage and broadcast some of BBC Two's content in HD late at night, time permitting. In 2008, BBC Sport officials indicated that they hoped to offer all of their output in HD by 2012, based on the availability of global feeds and planned new studios or HD-friendly renovations in London and Manchester.

Non sport broadcast include simulcasts of The Proms, the Eurovision Song Contest 2007, 2008, 2009, 2010 and 2011 and the 2009 United States presidential inauguration and coverage of the 2010 United Kingdom general election. It also regularly broadcast Test Card X which would last 90 seconds to 2 minutes.

=== Children ===
The channel also aired select CBBC and CBeebies shows produced in the HD format.

== Logos ==
Logo used from 2006 to 2008.

== See also ==
- High-definition television in the United Kingdom
- BBC HD Scandinavia
