= BBC First =

British international television channel

- BBC First logo (2022–present)
- Country: United Kingdom
- Broadcast area: Australia and New Zealand; Europe; Southeast Asia; Canada; Western Asia; North and South Africa

Programming
- Language: Various
- Picture format: 1080i HDTV

Ownership
- Owner: BBC Studios
- Sister channels: BBC NL; BBC Earth; BBC UKTV; BBC HD; BBC Lifestyle; BBC News (International); BBC Brit; CBeebies

History
- Launched: 3 August 2014; 11 years ago
- Replaced: BBC Entertainment (Asia); BBC HD (Poland)
- Closed: 1 September 2020; 5 years ago (Africa) 31 July 2024; 21 months ago (Australia) 15 May 2025; 12 months ago (Netherlands) 1 May 2026; 21 days ago (Malaysia)

Links
- Website: BBC First Asia; BBC First Canada; BBC First New Zealand

BBC First is an entertainment subscription television channel featuring comedy, crime, drama and film programming, originating from UK and mostly from the BBC. The channel is wholly owned and operated by BBC Studios. The channel began rolling out internationally in 2014, launching first in Australia. It is supported by extended localised advertising breaks.

== History ==
In October 2013, the BBC announced that in 2014 they would roll out three new brands – BBC Earth, BBC First, and BBC Brit, with BBC First to be dedicated to comedy and drama programming.

== International roll-out ==
=== Asia ===
==== Hong Kong ====
On 1 November 2016, BBC First launched as a Subscription Video-On-Demand (SVOD) service in Hong Kong. The channel replaced BBC On Demand and BBC Entertainment on Now TV. On 14 November 2016, the service was launched on myTV Super OTT platform until 31 January 2023.

==== Indonesia ====
In April 2021, BBC First launched as a Subscription Video-On-Demand (SVOD) service in Indonesia through Catchplay, which also serves as the platform's partner in Taiwan.

==== Malaysia ====
BBC First was launched as a Subscription Video-On-Demand (SVOD) service on HyppTV Channel 812 on 1 October 2016, 10 months after BBC Entertainment was dropped from the provider. The channel's content is also available in the "VOD" tab in the Unifi TV 2.0 app for iOS and Android.

In mid-October 2021, BBC First launched as an SVOD service on Astro, along with BBC Brit. Later on 1 May 2026, this channel along with BBC Brit ceased operations and transmissions.

==== Singapore ====
BBC First launched a Subscription Video-On-Demand (SVOD) service on StarHub TV Channel 522 on 4 April 2016. On 1 December 2021, BBC First launched a Video-On-Demand (VOD) service on Singtel TV.

==== Taiwan ====
In 2008, BBC Studios signed a cooperation agreement with Taiwanese OTT service myVideo to offer its drama content.

=== Australia ===
On 17 April 2013, it was announced that the BBC had forged a new exclusive deal with Australian subscription television provider Foxtel which would see a new channel launched that would feature comedy and drama content, with programming screening as close to their original UK transmission as possible. It was later announced the new channel would be named BBC First, a new global brand that would roll out in 2014, with Australia being the first location to launch the new channel, on 3 August 2014. The channel exited Foxtel and Binge on 31 July 2024.

The channel reappeared on Britbox in June 2025.

=== Canada ===
In March 2021, Canadian broadcaster Blue Ant Media, which already operated the Canadian version of BBC Earth, announced that its HIFI channel would be rebranded as a Canadian version of BBC First on March 16, expanding the company's partnership with BBC Studios. Unlike the other versions, the Canadian channel is not directly owned by BBC Studios, due to Canada's regulations around foreign ownership of Canadian media, but is operated by Blue Ant under a brand licensing agreement.

Previously, the market had been served by the similarly formatted BBC Canada, which was closed by then-owner Corus Entertainment at the end of 2020; many of the BBC programs carried by the prior channel carried over to BBC First. Blue Ant Media's founder Michael MacMillan is a former executive of BBC Canada's original parent company Alliance Atlantis.

=== New Zealand ===
On 1 October 2024 Sky launched BBC First on channel 207.

=== Europe ===
==== Netherlands ====
BBC First launched in the Netherlands on 16 May 2015.

On 15 May 2025 the channel was renamed to BBC NL in the Netherlands, while remaining BBC First in Belgium.

==== Belgium ====
BBC First launched in Belgium on 4 June 2015.

On 5 May 2026, BBC First will be rebranded as BBC Belgium.

==== Central and Eastern Europe ====
BBC First made its debut as a linear channel in Poland on 26 October 2018, replacing BBC HD.

Commenting on the development, Jacek Koskowski, general manager and VP for Poland, BBC Studios, said: “We’re living through a golden era of British drama with outstanding talent producing some of the very best television in the world. Increasing the drama hours on BBC HD was integral to that channel’s recent growth and now we are going further by bringing viewers even more of what they want. Coupled with the addition of Polish and English subtitles for the first time, I’m delighted to be introducing a dedicated premium drama channel to Poland”.

BBC First launched in Croatia, North Macedonia and Slovenia on 1 April 2019, followed by Romania on 12 October 2022 and Moldova on 6 June 2023.

==== Malta ====
The channel launched in Malta on 1st April 2024 and it is available on Melita EPG 300 and GOTV EPG 200, replacing BBC Entertainment. Both providers provide the channel in HD with catch-up features.

==== Turkey ====
The channel launched in Turkey on 27 May 2020, replacing BBC HD.

==== Middle East & North Africa ====
BBC First launched on OSN.As of 2026 not on OSN.

=== Africa ===
==== South Africa ====
The channel launched on DStv in South Africa on 18 October 2015. On 4 August 2020, it was announced that BBC First would close in South Africa at the end of August 2020 after its current carriage agreement with MultiChoice was not renewed. Some of its programming was moved to sister channel BBC Brit and streaming service Britbox.

=== Programming blocks ===
There are BBC First programming blocks on the following channels:

- AXN Mystery (Japan, since 7 May 2015)
- Zee Café (India, since 26 June 2017)
