= BBC Lifestyle =

International television channel

- Broadcast area: South Africa, Asia, Poland, MENA, Romania, and Singapore

Programming
- Language: English
- Picture format: 1080i HDTV

Ownership
- Owner: BBC Studios
- Sister channels: BBC News (International); BBC Brit; BBC Entertainment; BBC HD; BBC Earth; CBeebies; BBC First

History
- Launched: 1 July 2007; 18 years ago 15 September 2021; 4 years ago (Astro, Malaysia); 1 October 2023; 2 years ago (Cignal, Philippines)
- Replaced: BBC Food; National Geographic (Cignal, Philippines); Star World (Taiwan)
- Closed: 6 January 2016; 10 years ago (Nordic Regions); 1 May 2026; 21 days ago (Astro feed, Malaysia)

Links
- Website: player.bbc.com/en/channel/bbc-lifestyle

Availability

Terrestrial
- (Singapore) Singtel TV: Channel 255 (HD)
- (Singapore) StarHub TV: Channel 432 (HD)
- (Philippines) Cignal TV: Channel 202

BBC Lifestyle is an international television channel wholly owned by BBC Studios. The channel provides six programming strands: Food, Home & Design, Fashion & Style, Health, Parenting, and Personal Development.

== History ==
BBC Lifestyle first launched in Singapore on mio TV in July 2007 (it is now on Singtel TV). It is also available in Hong Kong on now TV, in Poland on the Cyfrowy Polsat digital satellite platform, where it launched in December 2007, and in Romania on Digi TV digital cable television, where it launched on 31 December 2010. It has been available on DStv in South Africa and on OSN in the Middle East and North Africa since September 2008. Since then, it has also launched in the Scandinavian countries in November 2008, where it replaced BBC Prime on Canal Digital, Com Hem, Telia Digital-TV and FastTV.

In June 2009, hollywoodreporter.com cited the lack of viewership on SingTel's mio TV as the reason that the British Broadcasting Corporation terminated the right to air BBC Lifestyle, CBeebies and BBC Knowledge under permission registered BBC from 19 March 2009 to 15 December 2009. The BBC has since sourced StarHub TV as an alternative offering. Thus BBC Lifestyle is now on channel 432 on StarHub TV. However, as of 1 December 2021, BBC Lifestyle together with CBeebies made its return to Singtel TV along with the launch of BBC World News, BBC Earth and BBC First onto the platform.

BBC Lifestyle ceased broadcast in the Nordic region on 6 January 2016.

On 14 September 2021, BBC Lifestyle HD launched on Malaysian satellite TV service Astro.

BBC Lifestyle launched in the Philippines via Cignal on 1 October 2023, replacing National Geographic. Prior to that date, it can only be found in select provincial cable operators.

BBC Lifestyle was among the other pay TV channels to launch in Taiwanese cable TV providers on 1 January 2024, following the announcement of Star World and other Disney-owned linear channels to cease their operations in Taiwan.

Due to low viewership and mostly reruns shows, BBC Lifestyle ceased broadcasting on Astro on 1 May 2026.

== See also ==
- BBC News (International)
- BBC Knowledge
- BBC Entertainment
- CBeebies
- BBC First
- BBC HD
- BBC Earth
