= BBC Earth (international TV channel) =

Documentary subscription television channel

- Logo used since September 2023
- Country: United Kingdom
- Broadcast area: Middle East and North Africa; Nordic countries Latin America and Caribbean; Canada; Hungary; Poland; Australia; Romania; Laos; India (as Sony BBC Earth); South Korea; South Africa; New Zealand; Greece; Turkey; Asia-Pacific; Malaysia; Indonesia; Serbia; Czech Republic; Slovakia; Europe; Eurasia; South Asia; North America
- Headquarters: London, United Kingdom

Programming
- Language: Various
- Picture format: 1080i (16:9 HDTV)

Ownership
- Owner: BBC Studios
- Sister channels: BBC Brit; BBC HD; BBC Entertainment; BBC Lifestyle; BBC First; BBC News; CBeebies

History
- Launched: 1 February 2015; 11 years ago (Poland); 13 April 2015; 11 years ago (Nordic countries); 14 April 2015; 11 years ago (Romania, Turkey & Hungary); 1 September 2015; 11 years ago (Latin America & South Africa); 3 October 2015; 11 years ago (Asia); 28 December 2015; 10 years ago (Serbia); 1 January 2016; 10 years ago (Eastern Europe); 6 March 2017; 9 years ago (India, as Sony BBC Earth); 1 April 2017; 9 years ago (Philippines); 12 September 2017; 9 years ago (Laos); 1 October 2017; 9 years ago (Greece); 1 February 2018; 8 years ago (Croatia); 5 April 2018; 8 years ago (MENA); 22 October 2018; 8 years ago (New Zealand); 15 November 2018; 8 years ago (Czech Republic and Slovakia); 10 October 2019; 7 years ago (Australia); 15 September 2021; 5 years ago (Astro, Malaysia)
- Replaced: BBC Knowledge; BBC HD (Latin America only); BBC Entertainment (Eastern Europe only); Discovery Science (Astro, Malaysia); National Geographic (Taiwan)
- Closed: 13 April 2017; 9 years ago (Latin America); 14 December 2021; 4 years ago (Latvia); 1 April 2022; 4 years ago (Brunei); 17 April 2023; 3 years ago (Nordic countries); 1 October 2024; 2 years ago (Thailand)
- Replaced by: BBC Nordic

Links
- Website: bbcearth.com

Availability

Terrestrial
- (Malaysia) Astro: Channel 554 (HD)
- (Malaysia) NJOI: Channel 554 (HD)
- (Singapore) Singtel TV: Channel 203 (HD)
- (Singapore) StarHub TV: Channel 407 (HD)
- DStv (South Africa only): Channel 184
- (Philippines) Cignal TV: Channel 130
- (Philippines) SatLite: Channel 245 (HD)
- Channel 180 (HD)

BBC Earth is a documentary subscription television channel featuring premium factual programming. The channel is wholly owned and operated by BBC Studios. Originally set to roll out internationally in 2014, it was later announced that it would launch in 2015, starting in Poland.

== History ==
Former logo, used until 1 November 2024 in India

In October 2013, the BBC announced that in 2014 it would roll out three new brands, BBC Earth, BBC First and BBC Brit, with BBC Earth to be dedicated to premium factual programming. It was later announced that the channel would air series such as Frozen Planet and Wonders of the Universe. In addition, roughly 30 hours of new content would be ordered for the channel in its first year. The channel is set to replace BBC Knowledge; however, if the existing channel is successful in certain markets, it may continue to operate.

=== International roll-out ===
==== Poland ====
BBC Earth launched in Poland on 1 February 2015, replacing BBC Knowledge.

==== Nordic countries ====
BBC Earth replaced BBC Knowledge in Denmark, Norway, Sweden, Finland and Iceland on 13 April 2015. It was replaced by BBC Nordic on 17 April 2023.

==== Hungary ====
BBC Earth replaced BBC Knowledge on 14 April 2015.

==== Romania ====
On 14 April 2015, BBC Earth was launched in Romania, replacing BBC Knowledge.

==== Turkey ====
BBC Earth launched in Turkey, replacing BBC Knowledge on 14 April 2015.

==== Latin America ====
BBC Earth launched in the Latin American countries of Argentina, Brazil, Chile, Colombia, Costa Rica, Dominican Republic, Ecuador, El Salvador, Guatemala, Honduras, Mexico, Nicaragua, Panama, Paraguay, Peru, Uruguay and Venezuela on 1 September 2015, replacing BBC HD. On 13 April 2017, the channel ceased its transmissions, along with BBC Entertainment and CBeebies.

==== South Africa ====
The channel launched in South Africa on the DStv (satellite) platform replacing BBC Knowledge on 1 September 2015.

==== Asia ====
In Asia, BBC Earth launched in Cambodia, Hong Kong, Indonesia, Malaysia, Mongolia, Singapore, South Korea, Taiwan, Thailand and Vietnam on 3 October 2015, replacing BBC Knowledge. In the Philippines, it was launched on 1 April 2017 along with BBC World News. On 12 September 2017, it was announced to be launch via Laosat DTH in Laos. In Myanmar, the channel was available via Sky Net and CANAL+.

On 14 September 2021 BBC Earth HD, along with BBC Lifestyle HD, returned to Malaysian satellite TV service Astro.

BBC Earth was among the other pay TV channels to launch in Taiwanese cable TV providers on 1 January 2024, following the announcement of National Geographic and other Disney-owned linear channels to cease their operations in Taiwan.

==== Serbia ====
In Serbia, BBC Earth was launched on 28 December 2015 replacing BBC Entertainment.

==== Eastern Europe ====
BBC Earth launched in Eastern European countries on 1 January 2016, replacing BBC Entertainment.

==== Greece ====
In Greece, the channel was launched on Cosmote TV on 1 October 2017.

==== Middle East & North Africa (MENA) ====
BBC Earth launched in Middle East & North Africa through the beIN DTH and STC TV services on 5 April 2018.

==== India ====
BBC has entered into a joint venture with Sony Pictures Networks India to launch the channel in India, branded as Sony BBC Earth. It was launched on 6 March 2017, following regulatory approval of the joint venture. Kareena Kapoor was the launch ambassador for this channel.

==== Canada ====
On 6 December 2016, BBC Worldwide and Canadian media company Blue Ant Media announced plans to launch a Canadian version of BBC Earth. The channel launched on 24 January 2017 and on 18 February 2017 hosted the Canadian premiere of Planet Earth II, on the same date as the United States, where it also aired on BBC America. BBC Earth replaced Blue Ant Media's radX. Due to foreign ownership restrictions by the Canadian Radio-television and Telecommunications Commission, the channel is fully owned by Blue Ant Media, with the BBC Earth brand and programming licensed from BBC Worldwide.

==== New Zealand ====
BBC Earth launched on Sky on 22 October 2018 in New Zealand, replacing BBC Knowledge.

==== Australia ====
BBC Earth launched on Foxtel and Fetch TV in Australia on 10 October 2019, replacing BBC Knowledge. It was removed from Foxtel on July 31st 2024, though it remains available on Fetch TV.

==== United States ====
In the United States, BBC Earth does not have a channel in the country, but airs all BBC Earth programs on BBC America, and channels owned by Warner Bros. Discovery, while PBS also does the same thing, but also including partnerships in Nature, Nova and more. It also has a Roku streaming channel.

== Programming blocks ==
There are BBC Earth programming blocks on the following channels:

- ProSieben Maxx (Germany; since 3 September 2013)
- #0, previously Canal+ (Spain; since June 2015)
- Eén (Flanders; since Autumn 2015)
- WOWOW (Japan; since 2010)
