= BBC Brit =

International television channel owned by the BBC

- BBC Brit logo
- Country: United Kingdom
- Broadcast area: Poland; Nordics; Africa; Australia; St Helena; Singapore; Malaysia; Faroe Islands

Programming
- Language: Various
- Picture format: 1080i (16:9 HDTV)

Ownership
- Owner: BBC Studios
- Sister channels: BBC Earth; BBC HD; BBC Entertainment; BBC Lifestyle; BBC First; BBC News (international); CBeebies

History
- Launched: 1 February 2015; 11 years ago (Poland); 13 April 2015; 11 years ago (Nordics); 1 September 2015; 11 years ago (Africa); 1 November 2019; 7 years ago (Australia)
- Replaced: BBC Entertainment
- Closed: April 17, 2023; 3 years ago (Nordics); May 1, 2026; 6 months ago (Malaysia)
- Replaced by: BBC Nordic (Nordics)

Links
- Website: BBC Brit Africa BBC Brit Australia BBC Brit Poland

Availability

Terrestrial
- Televarpið (Faroe Islands): Channel 7/channel 24 (IPTV)
- Fetch TV (Australia): Channel 132
- DStv (Africa): Channel 120

BBC Brit is an entertainment subscription television channel featuring factual entertainment programming. The channel is wholly owned and operated by BBC Studios. Originally set to roll out internationally in 2014, it was later announced it would launch in 2015, starting in Poland.

== History ==
In October 2013, the BBC announced that in 2014, they would roll out three new brands – BBC Earth, BBC First, and BBC Brit, with BBC Brit to be dedicated to entertainment programming. It was later announced that the content would largely be factual entertainment, featuring the BBC series Top Gear with the possibility for increases in local adaptions of the series. Other series are to include Room 101 and Mock the Week. It was also announced that roughly 50 hours, or roughly 5 series, of new content would be ordered for the new channel.

=== International roll-out ===
==== Poland ====
BBC Brit premiered in Poland on 1 February 2015, replacing BBC Entertainment.

==== Nordic countries ====
BBC Brit replaced BBC Entertainment in Denmark, Norway, Sweden, Finland and Iceland on 13 April 2015. It was replaced by BBC Nordic on 17 April 2023.

==== Africa ====
The channel launched on DStv in Africa replacing BBC Entertainment on 1 September 2015.

==== Australia ====
BBC Brit and BBC Earth launched in Australia on 1 November 2019, through IPTV streaming service Fetch TV. Unlike other versions of the channel, this one is a video on demand service with selected programming accessible through the TV guide.

==== Singapore ====
The channel's content is offered exclusively on BBC Player Singapore (a local version of the BBC iPlayer service).

==== Malaysia ====
The channel's content is offered exclusively on BBC Player Malaysia (a local version of the BBC iPlayer service), which requires a valid unifi TV subscription to access it. In October 2021, BBC Brit contents have been available as SVOD contents on subscription TV provider Astro.

Later on 1 May 2026, this channel along with BBC First ceased operations and transmissions.
