= Michael MacMillan =

Canadian film and broadcasting executive (born 1957)

Michael MacMillan CM
- Born: Michael I. M. MacMillan; 1957 (age 68–69); Scarborough, Ontario, Canada
- Occupation: CEO of Blue Ant Media

Michael I. M. MacMillan CM (born 1957) is a Canadian film and broadcasting executive who is the CEO of Blue Ant Media.

== Career ==
MacMillan was previously the Executive Chairman of Alliance Atlantis. Macmillan co-founded Atlantis Films in 1978. In its early years, Atlantis was primarily a film and television production house, winning an Oscar in 1984 for its short film Boys and Girls and an Emmy in 1992 for Lost in the Barrens. Atlantis was also nominated for an Oscar for The Painted Door. In 1993, Atlantis became a broadcaster with the launch of its first network, Life Network. In 1998, Atlantis acquired Alliance Communications and became Alliance Atlantis. Under Michael's leadership, the company operated 13 Canadian television networks including HGTV Canada, Showcase Television, History Television and Food Network. The company also distributed and produced movies and television programs including the hit series CSI: Crime Scene Investigation. In 2007, Macmillan retired from Alliance Atlantis when he sold Alliance Atlantis to Canwest and Goldman Sachs.

In 2011, MacMillan returned to broadcasting by launching upstart media company Blue Ant Media, a privately held Canadian media company that creates and distributes engaging content in categories that span lifestyle, travel, music and entertainment. The company owns specialty channels Cottage Life, Travel + Escape, Makeful, and A.Side TV along with four premium, commercial-free channels Smithsonian, Love Nature, HIFI HD, BBC Earth and their companion websites. Its digital publishing division produces content for web, mobile and monthly tablet magazines for AUX and Travel + Escape. Cottage Life Media is a division of Blue Ant Media, publishers of Cottage Life and Cottage Life West and producer of various consumer shows. Blue Ant Media was named Marketing Magazine’s 2012 Media Player of the Year.

MacMillan is Co-founder and Chairman of Samara, non-partisan charitable organization that works to improve political participation in Canada. Samara was formed out of a belief in the importance of public service and public leadership. It is named after a samara, the winged seed that falls from the maple tree. Through its projects, it hopes to strengthen the health of Canada's democracy and encourage others to do the same. He is also the co-founder of the Open Roof Festival.

Additionally, Macmillan is the co-founder and co-owner of Closson Chase, a vineyard and winery in Prince Edward County, Ontario. Closson Chase produces pinot noir and chardonnay wines and was one of the pioneers in establishing Prince Edward County as a new location for winemaking in Canada.

== Personal life ==
MacMilllan lives in Toronto with his wife Cathy, and volunteers his time with various organizations, including Community Food Centres Canada, Civix and Human Rights Watch. MacMillan has three daughters and one grandson.
