= Cottage country =

Common name used in Canada for regions popular for recreational properties

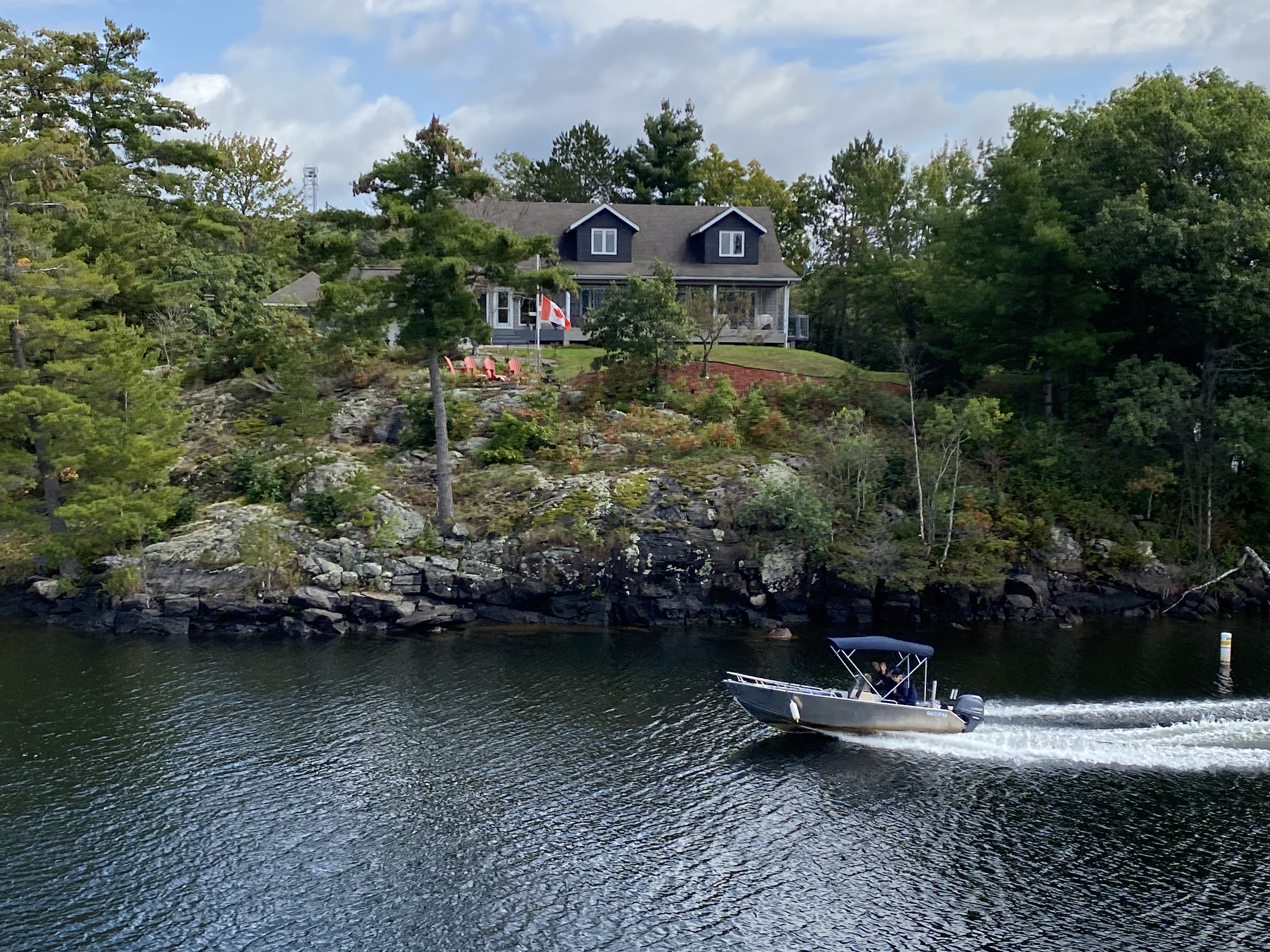
Luxury cottage at Muskoka in Central Ontario, part of the Great Lakes region

Cottage country is a common name for areas that are popular locations for vacation homes and recreational properties in rural Canada. These regions are defined by lakefront views, and forested landscapes that offer an escape from urban life for rest and recreation. Landholdings range from seasonal campgrounds and rustic, generations-old cabins to modern, multi-million dollar year round cottages.

"Roughing it" off-grid a nostalgic "wilderness" activity where families connect with nature and pass-down traditions, has long been a part of Canadian identity, representing a shared "cottage culture". Historically cottage season begins in May on the Victoria Day long weekend during the Stanley Cup playoffs, ending in October on the Thanksgiving long weekend. Winter activities include lounging by the fireplace, cross-country skiing, snowmobiling, ice skating and ice fishing; with summer pursuits including, watersports (kayaking, canoeing, waterskiing), hiking, lounging on docks and sitting around bonfires consuming outdoor foods such as BBQ, roasted marshmallows and S'mores alongside Canadian beer.

Terminologies used for recreational properties have regional usages and distinctions, with "cottage" utilized in Ontario, Quebec and the Maritimes, "cabin" is common in Western Canada and Newfoundland, while "camp" is used in Northern Ontario and New Brunswick, and "the lake" is frequently used in Manitoba. The term "chalet" (or chalet de campagne) is commonly used by French Canadians. Real estate terms include "summer house", '"vacation home'" and '"lake house'".

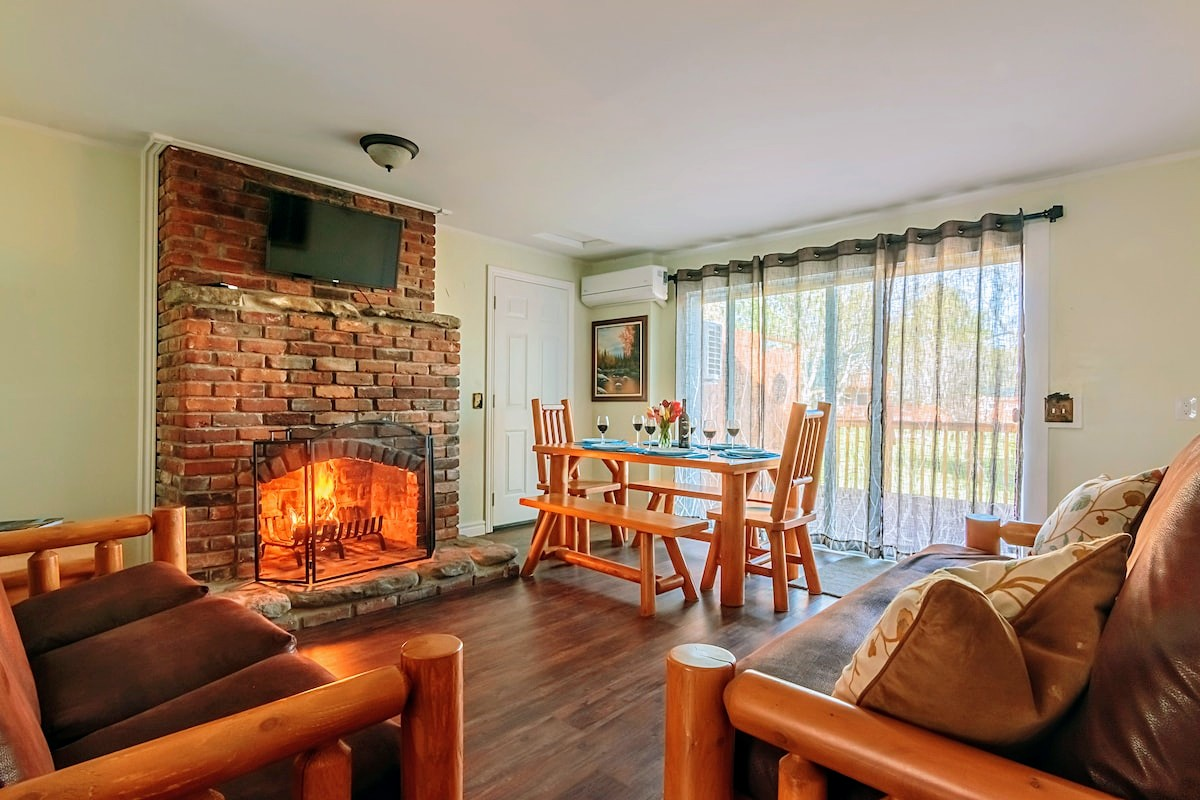
Interior of a 3-season rental cottage, Prince Edward County near Sandbanks Provincial Park

In Eastern Canada, the term "cottage" is often associated with a fully modern secondary residence, equipped with the usual amenities and technologies. In contrast, historically a "cabin" may be characterized by its rustic nature, typically lacking some modern conveniences, and is usually intended for use three seasons of the year, often heated by a wood fireplace or wood-burning stove. Tourist marketed cottage (cabin) rental properties across Canada are generally modern builds or historic renovated properties designed with 21st century amenities.

Key areas in Ontario include Muskoka, Ottawa Valley, Haliburton, the Kawarthas, Georgian Bay, Lake of the Woods, Rideau Lakes, and Prince Edward County. The Laurentians (Quebec), Okanagan Valley and Sunshine Coast (BC), and Canmore and Kananaskis (Alberta), Falcon Lake (Manitoba), Shediac (New Brunswick), Bras d'Or Lake and Cape Breton (Nova Scotia), and Manitou Beach, (Saskatchewan). Aside from privately used properties, these areas offer a wide range of rental accommodations from traditional hunting cabins to modern cottages, with the ability to accommodate campers and recreational vehicles.

In Southern Ontario, the term "cottage country traffic'" refers to traffic bound to cottage country on Friday afternoons and returning from it on Sunday afternoons. Cottage country traffic is usually extremely heavy on long weekends, such as Victoria Day in May, Canada Day on the July 1st weekend, Civic Holiday in August, and Labour Day in September. The Ontario media has often referred to these times of the year as a "highway blitz", which also refers to the related Ontario Provincial Police efforts to step up highway enforcement on those congested roads, which often yield record numbers of fines for motor vehicle violations.

== Gallery ==
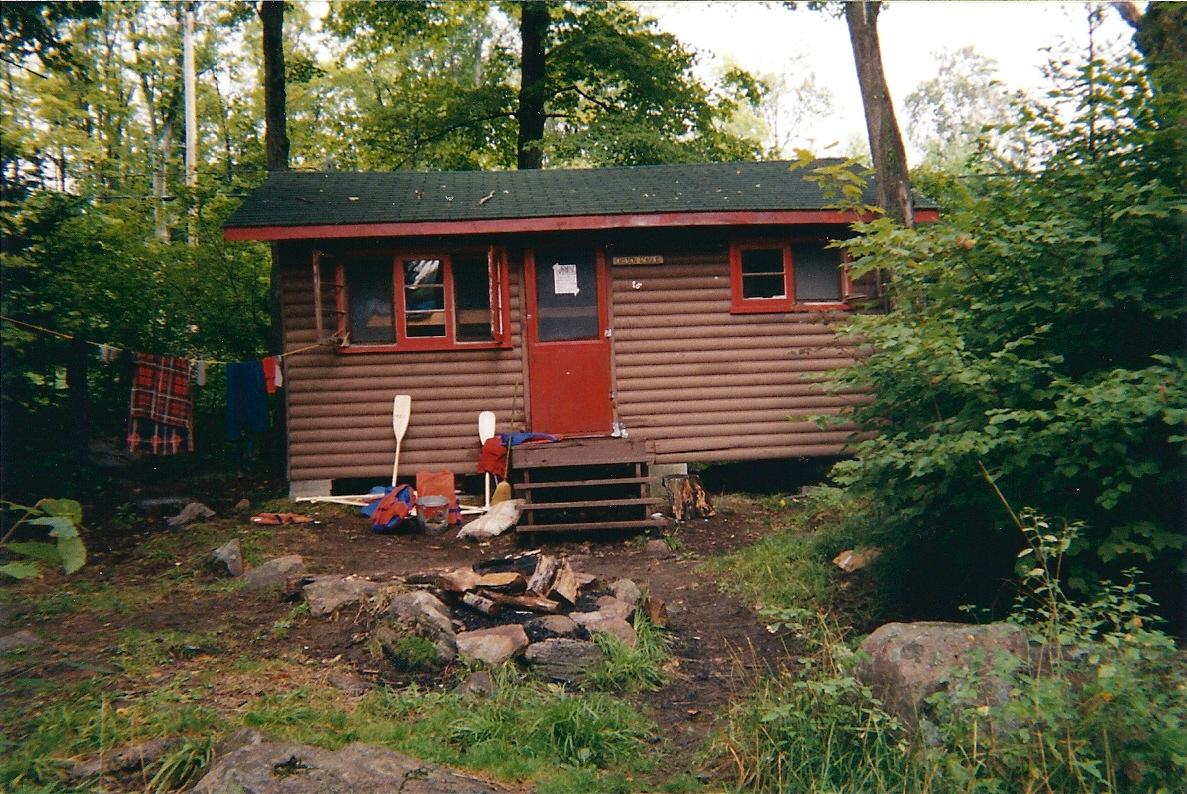
A typical cabin at the YMCA Wanakita summer camp in the late 1990s

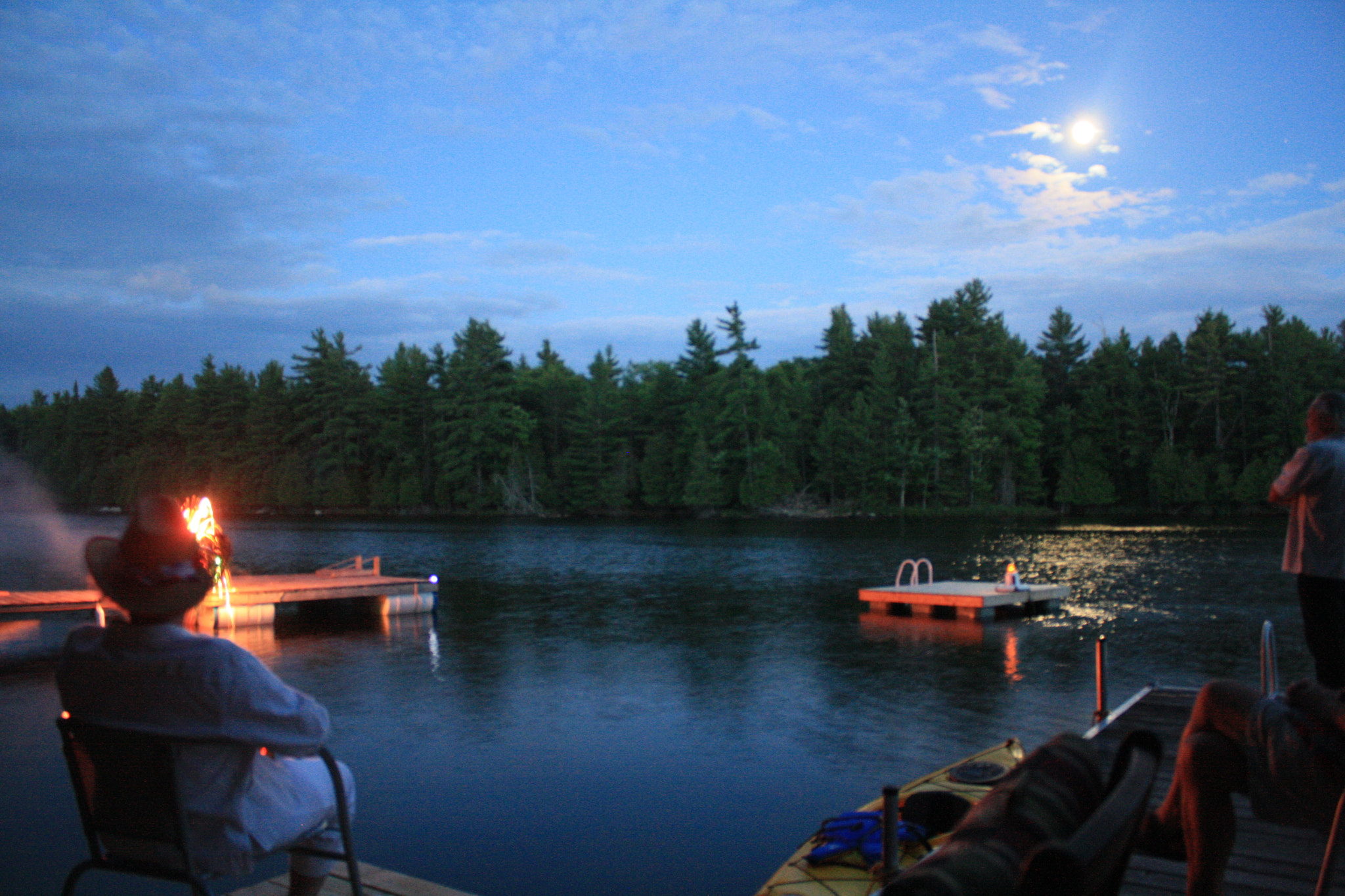
"Cottage Life" Renfrew, Ontario,

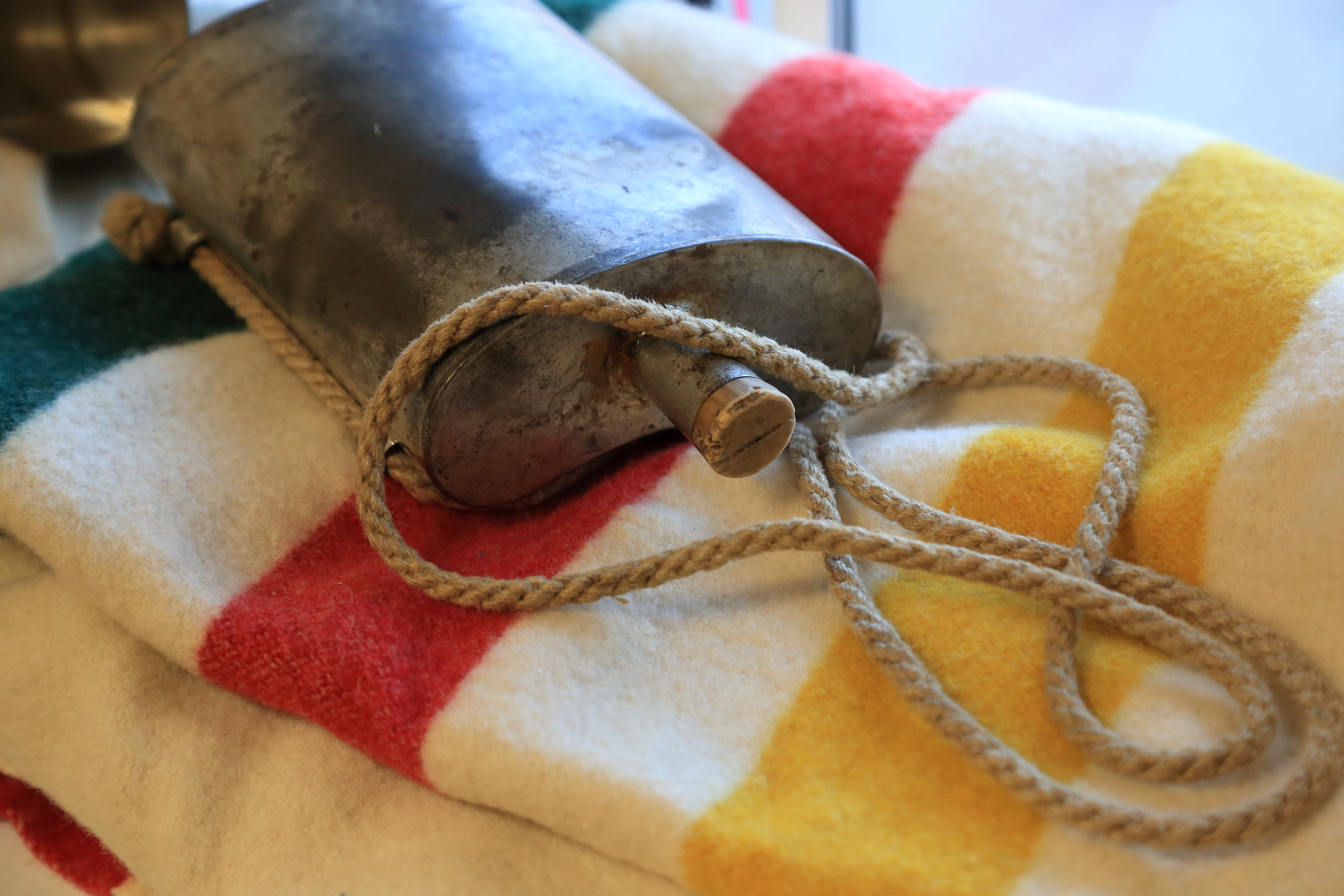
A Hudson's Bay point blanket commonly associated with "Canadian cottage culture"

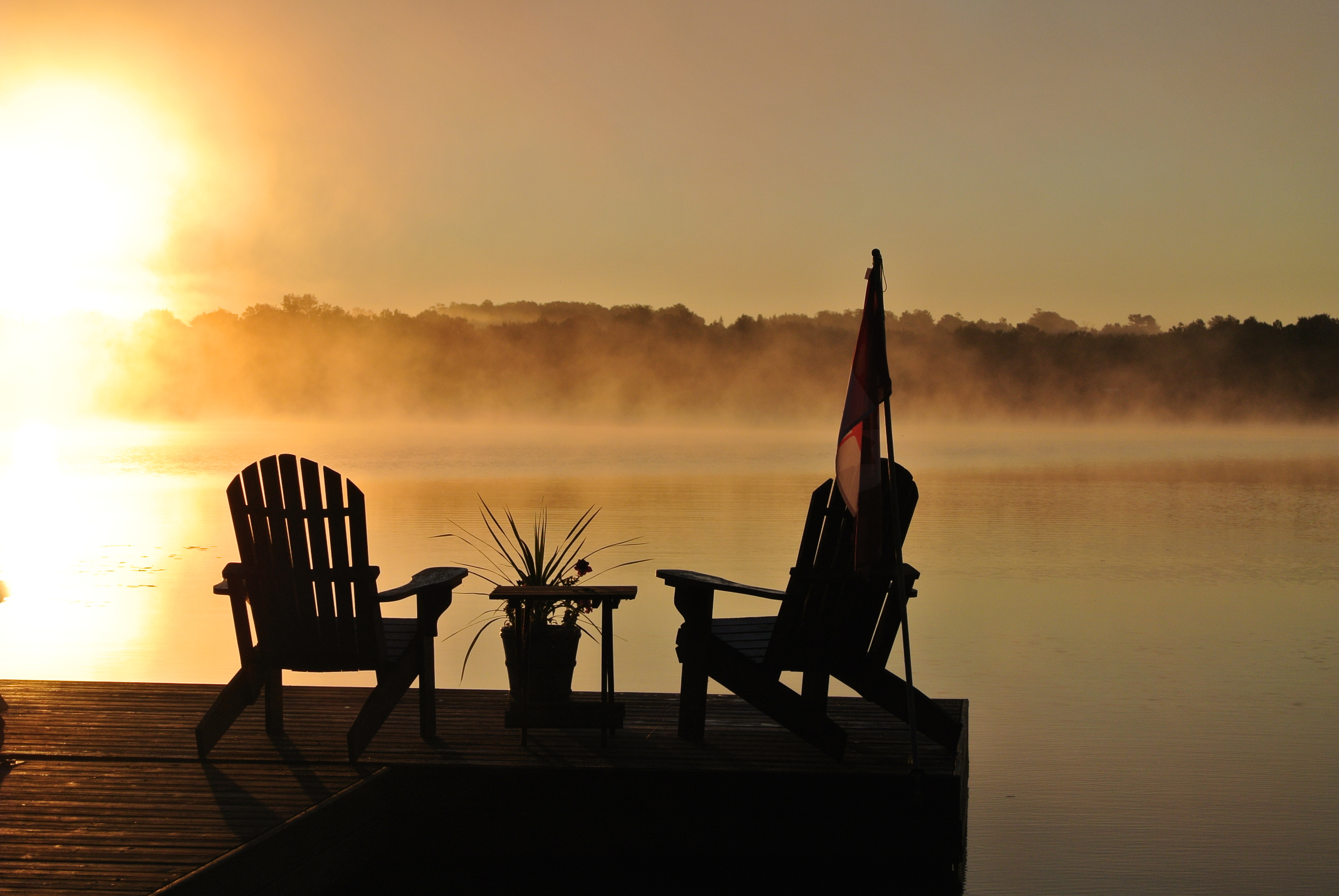
Dock view featuring Muskoka chairs (Adirondack) commonly associated with "Canadian cottage culture"

== See also ==
- Tourism in Canada#Ecotourism – About low-impact tourism in Canada
- Public holidays in Canada
- List of national parks of Canada
- List of Canadian protected areas

Media

- Canada's History – Canadian history magazine formerly known as The Beaver
- Cottage Life (magazine) – Canadian magazine
- Cottage Life (TV channel) – Canadian television channel
- Harrowsmith Magazine – Canadian magazine
- Bobcaygeon (song) – 1999 single by the Tragically Hip, about a police officer returning to cottage country
