= ZooMoo =

International multilanguage pay TV channel

- Broadcast area: Southeast Asia; Northwest Europe; Spain; Australia and New Zealand; Latin America; Brazil (known as DumDum); India; Italy; South Africa; Tanzania; United States; Canada; United Arab Emirates; Egypt; Caribbean; Central America

Programming
- Languages: English; Latin American Spanish; Brazilian Portuguese; Indonesian; Thai
- Picture format: 1080i HDTV (downscaled to 16:9 480i/576i for the SDTV feed)

Ownership
- Owner: Rock Entertainment Holdings
- Sister channels: Rock Entertainment; Rock Extreme (Taiwan only); Love Nature; Smithsonian Channel; Makeful; Global Trekker; Golden Chinese Drama (Hong Kong only); Outdoor Channel; Rock Action

History
- Launched: September 2013; 13 years ago (Brazil); 4 April 2014 (Starhub, Malaysia); 25 May 2018; 8 years ago (Easy TV, Philippines); 21 July 2018; 8 years ago (SD & HD feed, Virgin Media, United Kingdom); 1 December 2018; 7 years ago (Colours block (until 31 December 2021)); 1 April 2020; 6 years ago (Zuku TV, Kenya)
- Closed: 1 April 2018; 8 years ago (SD feed, Malaysia); 2018; 8 years ago (SD feed, United Kingdom); 2020; 6 years ago (HD feed, United Kingdom); 31 December 2021; 4 years ago (as a Colours block); 2022; 4 years ago (Virgin Media On Demand, United Kingdom)

Links
- Website: www.zoomoo.tv

Availability

Terrestrial
- DStv (Sub-Saharan Africa): Channel 314 (pop-up channel)
- Zuku TV (Kenya): Channel 630

ZooMoo is an international multilanguage pay television channel owned by Rock Entertainment Holdings that was first launched in Brazil in September 2013 in high definition (HD). The ZooMoo brand name is also used for international programming blocks broadcasting ZooMoo's original programming. As of September 2026, the channel broadcasts overseas in countries like Australia, Singapore, Kenya, United States, and Mexico and its shows stream on Kidoodle.TV and Rakuten TV in countries like India, France, Italy, Germany and Spain.

ZooMoo features puppetry, animations, games, music, puzzles and activities. Programming on the channel is a blend of in-house original productions and acquired programming such as Jelly Jamm and Miss Spider's Sunny Patch Friends.

== History ==
In 2012, two biology companies, Beach House Pictures and NHNZ, signed with DirecTV to make a new children’s television network by the name of “ZooMoo”. It was officially launched in Brazil on 11 September 2013, exclusive to Sky, and by 21 August 2014, it was launched all over Latin America via DirecTV.

By 4 April 2014, it was launched in Singapore via StarHub.

In 2016, Canadian-based Blue Ant Media acquired a majority stake in the channel, alongside Beach House Kids and NHNZ, and by then, the Spanish feed was launched in the United States.

On 25 May 2018, the channel was launched in the Philippines on Easy TV Home.

The channel launched on British cable television provider Virgin Media on channels 295 and 739 on 21 July 2018. A temporary duplicate of the SD channel launched a day later following the removal of the UKTV network of channels, taking the slot that was occupied by Eden +1, until the channels were added back onto the EPG on 11 August 2018.

The SD version was removed from channel 295 a few days later. The HD channel was removed from Virgin Media on 7 January 2020, the same day as 5Spike and VH1 closed. The UK channel later closed in the same year.

On 1 December 2018, a ZooMoo programming block was launched on Cignal's exclusive channel, Colours.

In Latin America, Brazil and the United States, ZooMoo is operated by AMC Networks International. Currently, the United States and Latin America share a ZooMoo feed, which is available in English and Spanish. The Brazilian feed, known as "DumDum" (formerly known as ZooMoo Kids and ZooMoo) features some exclusive shows produced in Brazil, and only features programming in Portuguese.

In March 2020, ZooMoo’s flagship channel in Brazil was rebranded as “ZooMoo Kids”, and after the rebrand, it left Claro TV alongside Love Nature on March 31.

On 1 April 2020, it was launched on Zuku TV in Kenya and 6 months later on DStv as a "pop-up channel" which has been extended from March to the end of June 2021.

On 16 June 2020, Your Family Entertainment and Blue Ant Media made a "content swap" agreement which enabled an exchange of programming between the YFE catalog and the international ZooMoo channels to occur. As a result, ZooMoo feeds worldwide began broadcasting series from the YFE catalog. The EMEA feed currently airs Albert Says... Nature Knows Best, Gloria's House, Urmel and Bob's Beach as a result of the swap. The United States/Latin America feed broadcasts Albert Says... Nature Knows Best, Urmel and Bob's Beach. The international kids' TV channels operated by YFE, Fix & Foxi and RiC, also begun to air some of ZooMoo's content, including their acquired animated series Jelly Jamm, as a result.

In September 2021, following Blue Ant’s channels rebranding to ROCK, ZooMoo was acquired by Rock Entertainment Holdings.

In 2022, ZooMoo was removed from Virgin Media On Demand in the United Kingdom because it was shut down on 7 January 2020, alongside Tiddlers TV, because it was rebranded as Virgin TV Kids on 10 April 2017.

In June 2025, ZooMoo Kids in Brazil was rebranded as DumDum.
