= BBC Canada =

Former Canadian television channel

- Country: Canada
- Broadcast area: Nationwide
- Headquarters: Toronto, Ontario

Programming
- Language: English
- Picture format: 1080i HDTV (downscaled to letterboxed 480i for the SDTV feed)

Ownership
- Owner: Corus Entertainment (80%, managing partner); BBC Studios (20%) (Jasper Broadcasting Inc.)

History
- Launched: 7 September 2001; 25 years ago
- Closed: 31 December 2020; 5 years ago
- Replaced by: BBC First (Canadian TV channel)

BBC Canada was a Canadian English language specialty channel that mostly broadcast television series originally produced by the BBC, the public-service broadcaster of the United Kingdom. The channel was owned by Corus Entertainment (80% & managing partner) and BBC Studios (20%).

== History ==
Alliance Atlantis (AAC) was granted a broadcast licence for a Category 2 speciality service covering "entertainment, drama and documentary programming". BBC Canada, by the Canadian Radio-television and Telecommunications Commission (CRTC) in November 2000. Alliance also received licenses for channels including National Geographic, IFC, and The Health Network, launched as Discovery Health. The channel was launched on 7 September 2001 as a joint venture between AAC and BBC Worldwide.

To promote the launch of BBC Canada's 2007 fall season, a 16-page British-style tabloid insert called the BBC Telly was published in the Toronto Star. Toronto-based Pilot PMR created the campaign.

On 28 January 2008, a joint venture between Canwest and Goldman Sachs Alternatives known as CW Media bought Alliance Atlantis and gained AAC's interest in BBC Canada. On 27 October 2010, the channel's ownership changed once again as Shaw Communications gained control of BBC Canada as a result of its acquisition of Canwest and Goldman Sachs' interest in CW Media.

On 13 May 2011, BBC Canada was separated from the now-defunct children's channel BBC Kids due to its ownership changing hands to Knowledge Network.

On 1 April 2016, Shaw Media was sold to Corus Entertainment. BBC Canada also earned several sister networks to go with the existing ones.

In a notice to subscribers posted in early November 2020, Corus sister company Shaw Direct indicated that the channel would be shutting down on 31 December 2020.

In March 2021, Blue Ant Media, a company owned by former Alliance Atlantis executive Michael MacMillan which already owns the Canadian version of BBC Earth, announced that its HIFI channel would be rebranded as a Canadian version of the BBC's international entertainment channel brand BBC First on 16 March. Several programs that had been carried by BBC Canada prior to its closure, including Top Gear and Antiques Roadshow, were picked up by BBC First.

== Programming ==
While BBC Canada was part-owned by the BBC, not all of the BBC's programmes aired on BBC Canada. In general, while BBC Worldwide and its affiliated operations have a "first look" at the corporation's output, this right only applies so long as BBC Worldwide pays no less than what the BBC Commercial Agency, which is at arm's length, judges to be a particular property's value. Furthermore, while BBC Canada served a similar purpose to the BBC America channel available in the United States, there are also significant differences between the programming rights owned by the two channels.

This meant that much of the BBC's output (and, for that matter, BBC America's original programming) aired on other Canadian channels which have either co-produced the programmes or simply bid more for the Canadian broadcast rights. Conversely, many of the British series that did air on the channel are not sourced from the BBC, with some having originally been produced by or aired on other British channels, such as the privately owned ITV or the independent public-service broadcaster Channel 4.

Despite its British focus, BBC Canada was licensed as a Canadian channel and was not exempt from the CRTC's broadcasting regulations that required it to carry a quota of Canadian content. This meant that in addition to British programmes, it also broadcast a number of Canadian series, which according to the channel's licence were required to "explore or [be] informed by Canada's relationship to the United Kingdom and the Commonwealth". Canadian programmes that aired on the channel included repeats of Disaster DIY and Holmes Inspection. In the early 2010s, the channel began airing American series featuring British personalities, such as the American version of the Gordon Ramsay programme Kitchen Nightmares (it has also in the past carried the British parent series Ramsay's Kitchen Nightmares), and repeat airings of the American dramas House and Elementary (each of which has a British actor in the lead role).

Many of the channel's programmes, whether British, American or Canadian, were shared with other Corus Entertainment channels such as the Global Television Network, Showcase, HGTV Canada and Food Network Canada.

BBC Canada did not ordinarily carry BBC News programming, as the BBC World News channel is also widely available in Canada, and BBC News also has a long-standing content-sharing agreement with the CBC. On the rare occasions that BBC Canada did carry news coverage, coverage may have been produced by Corus-owned Global News instead of the BBC, such as with the wedding of Prince William and Catherine Middleton.

== BBC Canada HD ==
In October 2016, Corus Entertainment launched BBC Canada HD, a 1080i high definition simulcast of the standard definition feed. The HD feed was only available on Telus Optik TV and Shaw Direct. The HD simulcast was shut down on 31 December 2020.

== Related properties ==
Apart from the television channel, BBC Worldwide directly operates a BBC Canada Shop website which sells merchandise related to British television series such as Top Gear, Little Britain and Doctor Who.

== See also ==
- BBC
- Other BBC-associated television channels available in Canada:
  - BBC News Arabic - news service in Arabic operated under licence by Ethnic Channels Group
  - BBC Earth – factual programming channel operated under licence by Blue Ant Media
  - BBC Kids – now-defunct children's channel majority-owned by Knowledge Network
  - BBC World News – distributed directly as a permitted foreign channel
  - BritBox – cross-genre British TV streaming service jointly owned by BBC Studios, ITV plc and AMC Networks
