= Blue Ant Media =

Canadian broadcasting and media company

Blue Ant Media Corporation
- Type: Public
- Traded as: TSX: BAMI
- Industry: Mass media
- Predecessor: Boat Rocker Media; Thunderbird Entertainment
- Founded: December 21, 2011; 14 years ago
- Founders: Michael MacMillan
- Headquarters: Toronto, Ontario, Canada
- Area served: Worldwide
- Key people: Michael MacMillan (CEO)
- Products: Broadcasting, television production, publishing
- Number of employees: 312 (2026)
- Divisions: Blue Ant Rights & Streaming; Blue Ant Studios
- Website: blueantmedia.com

Blue Ant Media Corporation is a Canadian multinational media company founded in 2011 by former Alliance Atlantis executive Michael MacMillan. Headquartered in Toronto, it has offices in Los Angeles, New York, Miami, Sydney, Halifax, and Ottawa.

The company has interests in domestic and international television production, broadcasting (including multiple Canadian specialty channels), streaming, and publishing, with most of its properties being focused primarily on factual content.

Blue Ant Media has expanded primarily via acquisitions, with its earliest investments including Glassbox Television and High Fidelity HDTV. In 2025, Blue Ant Media acquired Boat Rocker Media as part of a reverse takeover, subsequently going public on the Toronto Stock Exchange.

== History ==
In 2011, former Alliance Atlantis executive Michael MacMillan founded Blue Ant Media. The company was named in reference to the "Blue Ant" trilogy by American-Canadian sci-fi writer William Gibson, since an in-universe company named Blue Ant was portrayed in the novels as being "the company of the future".

MacMillan explained that his goal for the company was to be a producer and distributor of content across multiple platforms, and "not just have individual pieces of content" but be "deep experts" in niche markets with advertiser appeal (such as music, comedy, and travel).

Blue Ant's first investment was to buy a 29.9% stake in specialty broadcaster Glassbox Television, owner of specialty networks such as AUX, Bite TV and Travel + Escape — with the option to increase this stake to 75% pending CRTC approval. Glassbox founder Jeffery Elliott was retained as Blue Ant's head of television and digital, joined by former Glassbox CEO Raja Khanna.

On December 21, 2011, Blue Ant Media announced it had entered into an agreement to acquire specialty broadcaster High Fidelity HDTV, initially acquiring 29.1%, with the remaining stake to be purchased after CRTC approval. The acquisition was completed on August 1, 2012.

While awaiting completion of the acquisition of High Fidelity HDTV, the Canadian firm announced a 25% investment by Torstar. At that time, Khanna became head of television and digital after Elliott left the company.

On August 17, 2012, Blue Ant announced that it would buy the specialist channel Bold from the Canadian Broadcasting Corporation for an undisclosed sum, subject to government approval. After initially acquiring a 15% stake in Canadian publisher Quarto Communications in the summer of 2011, it bought the remainder of the company the following year, which had been renamed Cottage Life Media.

In November 2014, seven months after acquiring a minority stake in the digital media company and multi-channel network Omnia Media, the firm bought a majority stake in Choice TV, marking their first international expansion. In December 2015, Blue Ant Media Corp. and Smithsonian Networks teamed to launch Blue Skye Entertainment, a new UK-based company exclusively focused on 4K content.

In December 2016, Blue Ant partnered with BBC Worldwide to relaunch radX as BBC Earth.

In May 2017, Blue Ant Media bought the Asia-Pacific broadcaster Racat Group, including factual producer NHNZ, Singapore-based studio Beach House Pictures, Sydney-based Northern Pictures, developer Runaway Play, and a majority stake in ZooMoo. The purchase was considered to be complementary to the Blue Ant's factual and nature-oriented programming.

=== Expansion and acquisitions (2018–present) ===
In February 2018, Omnia Media was renamed Blue Ant Digital Studios, coinciding with the launch of several new original series on Facebook Watch, and an accompanying expansion beyond video gaming content. In October 2018, Blue Ant acquired the Toronto-based Saloon Media.

In 2020, Blue Ant Media (BAM) sold its Asian linear networks & the rights to Spanish animated series Jelly Jamm, aside from Love Nature, including Blue Ant Entertainment, Blue Ant Extreme, and ZooMoo, to Rock Entertainment Holdings, a new company led by Blue Ant's then-head of Global Networks & Kids Ward Platt. In October, Blue Ant Media announced its acquisition of the Canadian technology news website MobileSyrup.

In December, BAM entered the free ad-supported streaming television (FAST) market by launching HauntTV, a channel devoted to horror and supernatural programming, on The Roku Channel in Canada. It has since launched several additional FAST channels in Canada and the United States; including CrimeTime, TotalCrime, Homeful, and HistoryTime.

In February 2021, Blue Ant sold its majority stake in New Zealand factual production company NHNZ to producer Julie Christie. It was rebranded as NHNZ Worldwide, with Blue Ant Media retaining a 45% stake in the rebranded company and continuing to own NHNZ's catalogue.

The following month, it expanded its partnership with BBC Studios by relaunching Treasure HD as BBC First. A de facto successor to Corus Entertainment's BBC Canada, the channel had originally been founded by Alliance Atlantis, of which the founder of Blue Ant was an executive.

When it was acquired along with its bookstore in June 2022 and its founders joined Blue Ant, the British distributor Drive Media Rights was merged into its distribution arm, Blue Ant International. In September, Blue Ant Media announced their acquisition of CTV marketplace company Media Pulse, which became a standalone unit within the company.

In January 2023, Blue Ant partnered with World of Wonder on a U.S. FAST channel devoted to international versions of RuPaul's Drag Race.

In August 2023, Blue Ant announced its acquisition of Canadian production company MarbleMedia, and plans to merge their studio operations (aside from Blue Ant's Singaporean subsidiary Beach House Pictures) into a single division; the acquisition would increase Blue Ant's involvement in scripted content. Following the completion of the purchase, MarbleMedia's co-founders Mark Bishop and Matthew Hornburg were named the new co-presidents of Blue Ant Studios, leading the non-scripted and scripted units respectively.

In February 2024, Fremantle acquired a majority stake in Beach House Pictures, including the entirety of Blue Ant's stake. In June 2024, Blue Ant sold MobileSyrup to ZoomerMedia. In August 2024, Blue Ant sold its digital brand Animalogic to Toronto-based digital media company Underknown.

On March 24, 2025, Blue Ant Media announced that it would acquire Boat Rocker Media in a reverse takeover to expand its children's and unscripted business. Blue Ant would retain its subsidiaries Jam Filled Entertainment, Insight Productions, and Proper Television, and divested the rest of Boat Rocker's assets (including Boat Rocker Studios) to a new private company held by its lead executives for $18 million. The transaction was completed on August 21, 2025, after which the company went public on the Toronto Stock Exchange as Blue Ant Media Corporation, with Boat Rocker shareholders holding a 26.5% stake in its stock.

On October 2, 2025, Blue Ant Media announced that it had acquired the documentary-oriented streaming service MagellanTV for $12 million.

On November 26, 2025, Blue Ant announced that it would acquire Vancouver-based studio Thunderbird Entertainment for $63 million. Following the completion of the purchase, Blue Ant Studios was reorganized into a "genre-based" structure, with former Thunderbird CEO Jennifer Twiner McCarron leading its Kids & Family unit (including Atomic Cartoons and Jam Filled, which will continue as studios), an unscripted unit being led by Cathie James (incorporating Great Pacific Media and Proper Television, which were both folded into Blue Ant Studios and discontinued), and Insight Productions handling "premium" franchises and competition programming.

In March 2026, Blue Ant announced an agreement to handle advertising sales for ZoomerMedia specialty channel VisionTV.

In June 2026, Blue Ant Media announced that it would merge its distribution and streaming divisions as Blue Ant Rights & Streaming, with Mark Bishop named chief monetization officer, and former president of global channels and streaming Carlyn Staudt being released from the company.

== Assets ==
=== Specialty channels (Canada) ===
- BBC Earth (Canada)
- BBC First (Canada)
- Cottage Life
- Love Nature
- Makeful
- Smithsonian Channel (Canada)
- T+E

=== Streaming ===
- MagellanTV
- FAST channels
  - Love Nature
  - Crime Time
  - Declassified
  - Drag Race Universe
  - Haunt TV
  - HistoryTime
  - Homeful
  - Love Pets
  - Total Crime
  - Nature Moments
  - Nature Time

=== Studios ===
Blue Ant Studios is Blue Ant's production arm. It was originally formed as an amalgamation of Blue Ant's production assets following the company's acquisition of MarbleMedia, with its co-founders Mark Bishop and Matthew Hornburg serving as heads of non-scripted and scripted programming respectively.

As of its acquisition of Thunderbird Entertainment, it is currently divided into four divisions:

- Blue Ant Rights
- Insight Productions
- Kids & Family & YA
  - Atomic Cartoons
  - Jam Filled Entertainment
- Unscripted

=== Print ===
- Cottage Life

=== Former ===
- A.Side TV
- Animalogic
- Antenna Pictures (London)
- Beach House Pictures (Singapore)
- Blue Ant Entertainment (Asia-Pacific)
- Blue Ant Extreme (Asia-Pacific)
- Choice TV (New Zealand)
- CinemaWorld (Asia-Pacific and Latin America)
- Great Pacific Media (Canada)
- HGTV (New Zealand)
- Love Nature (Asia)
- Makeful (Asia)
- MobileSyrup (Canada, sold to ZoomerMedia)
- NHNZ (New Zealand)
- Proper Television (Canada)
- ZooMoo (Asia-Pacific and Latin America)

== Filmography ==
Title	Years	Network	Notes
Highway Thru Hell	2012–present	USA Network Canada	Took over from Great Pacific Media
Gary and His Demons	2018–2022	CBC Gem; VRV/Amazon Prime Video (United States)	inherited from Look Mom! Productions co-production with Mondo Media and Solis Animation
Blown Away	2019–2024	Makeful	inherited from MarbleMedia
Detention Adventure	2019–2022	CBC Gem	co-production with Loco Motion Pictures and Broken Compass Films
Bigfoot	2019	VRV (United States)	inherited from Look Mom! Productions co-production with Mondo Media and Solis Animation
Restaurants on the Edge	2020	Cottage Life	via Blue Ant Media co-production with MarbleMedia and OutEast Entertainment
The Healing Powers of Dude	2020	Netflix	co-production with Meekel Meekel
Canada's Drag Race	2020–present	Crave	A Canadian adaptation of RuPaul's Drag Race co-production with World of Wonder
World's Most Scenic River Journeys	2021–2022	Smithsonian Channel Canada; Channel 5 (United Kingdom)	via Blue Ant Media co-production with Saloon Media and BrightSpark East
Mary Makes It Easy	2021–present	CTV Life Channel	Took over production from Proper Television
Epstein's Shadow: Ghislaine Maxwell	2021	Peacock; Sky Documentaries (United Kingdom)	co-production with Alitar Productions
Doomlands	2022–2024	The Roku Channel	inherited from Look Mom! Productions
Evil by Design: Exposing Peter Nygård	2022	CBC Gem	
Mysteries from Above	2022–present	Cottage Life	
Killers: Caught on Camera	2023–present	True Crime	under Blue Ant Rights co-production with Back2Back Productions
I Have Nothing	2023	Crave	co-production with Catalyst
Ghosting with Luke Hutchie and Matthew Finlan	2024–2025	CBC Gem	
Old Enough!	2024–present	TVO	Based on the Japanese format of the same name by Junji Ōuchi and Nippon Television
Slaycation	2024–present	Crave	co-production with World of Wonder
Murder Has Two Faces	2025	Hulu	co-production with ABC News Studios and Cortés Filmworks
The Great Art Fraud	2025	BBC Two	
Crew Girl	2026–present	Netflix	Took over development & production from Great Pacific Media
Tralala	TBA	CBC; Sky TV (New Zealand)	co-production with Stretchy
Wild Science	TBA	Love Nature; 3sat (Germany)	co-production with ZDF Studios and Big Media
Engineering from Above	TBA	Cottage Life	
