= Albert Says... Nature Knows Best =

- Albert sagt… Natur – aber nur!
- Genre: Education; Comedy
- Created by: Frederic Vester
- Based on: Frederic Vester
- Country of origin: Germany
- Original language: German
- No. of seasons: 2
- No. of episodes: 13

Production
- Running time: 25 minutes

Original release
- Network: ZDF
- Release: 1995 – 1997

Albert sagt... Natur – aber nur! (Albert Says... Nature Knows Best) is a German science cartoon series that was broadcast with 13 episodes on ZDF between 1995 and 1997. The series is based on the books of Frederic Vester, and in the foreground was the teaching of environmental and ecological awareness.

A spin-off series, called Albert auf Entdeckungstour (Albert Asks What is Life?), was released in 2002.

Currently both the series and its spinoff air on the Fix & Foxi and RiC television stations worldwide. Albert Says... Nature Knows Best is also airing in Asia, Latin America, the Middle East and the United States on the ZooMoo television channel.

== Content ==
The main character Albert is a mythical creature that resembles a combination between a bird and a hamster. Albert, although cheeky, is characterized by curiosity and kindness, and he gets along with all animals. Albert goes on adventures to explain the workings of nature and the environment. He can fly, run, swim and dive, as well as change his size to become giant or tiny. This allows him to study nature with utmost attention to detail and increase his knowledge. In addition to the importance of nature and the environment, the animated series brings awareness to potential hazards and environmental problems. In particular, hazards arising from human or machine threat are discussed.

== See also ==
- List of German television series
