= High Fidelity HDTV =

- Type: Private
- Industry: Media, High-definition television
- Founded: 2003; 23 years ago
- Founder: John Panikkar
- Defunct: 2013
- Headquarters: Toronto, Ontario, Canada
- Key people: Ken Murphy (CEO); David Patterson (Partner); Frank Bertolas (Executive VP & CFO)
- Products: Broadcasting, Television Production
- Owner: Blue Ant Media
- Number of employees: 45

High Fidelity HDTV was a Canadian licensed television broadcaster specializing in HD content. The company was founded in 2003 by co-founders John Panikkar and Ken Murphy, both of whom have been involved in the Canadian broadcasting industry for many years. David Patterson, an experienced Canadian senior broadcast executive, joined the company in 2005 as a partner and part owner of the company, and Frank Bertolas, also an experienced Canadian senior broadcast executive, joined the company in 2010. High Fidelity HDTV was headquartered in Toronto, Ontario and it operated 4 HD channels. In 2006, the company was set to launch a 5th HD channel, Baby HD. In 2007, the company was poised to launch more HD channels: Aqua HD, Centre Stage HD, Clash HD, Crafts & Hobbies HD, Eureka! HD, GameWorld HD, Seniors Life HD, Women's Sports HD, Horror HD, & W HD. In 2008, the company proposed 2 more HD channels, Diversion HD & Canada HD, as well as a non-HD network, Diversion. However, the applications for the channels was denied by the Canadian Radio-television and Telecommunications Commission (CRTC). In 2010, the company was set to launch yet another channel (non-HD), The Wedding Channel.

High Fidelity HDTV signed exclusive content deals with IMAX (giving them access to their original films), Smithsonian Networks & Off the Fence, an independent production company that distributes non-fiction content worldwide.

On December 21, 2011, High Fidelity HDTV announced that it had entered into an agreement to be purchased outright by Blue Ant Media, majority owners of Glassbox Television and minority owners of Quarto Communications. While initially purchasing 29.9% of the company, the remaining 70.1% would be purchased following its approval by the CRTC. The acquisition was completed on August 1, 2012. As of 2013, the company no longer exists, the 4 channels are now part of Blue Ant Media & the other proposed channels were never launched.

== Channels ==
- Smithsonian Channel (formerly Equator HD Canada & eqhd) (conceived as Meridian HD) (People and places)
- BBC First (formerly HIFI and Tresure HD Canada) (conceived as Artefact HD) (Arts & culture)
- Love Nature (formerly Oasis HD & Oasis) (Nature)
- BBC Earth (formerly Rush HD Canada, then radX) (conceived as A HD [for Adrenaline HD]) (Action & adventure)

=== Channels proposed, but never launched ===
- Aqua HD (water life & boating)
- Baby HD (programming for infants and their development)
- Centre Stage HD (music-themed with live performances)
- Canada HD (general interest high definition; would've competed with HDNet in Canada)
- Clash HD (history-themed channel)
- Crafts & Hobbies HD
- Diversion/HD (post-pay exhibition window, non-independent feature films that span all genres and related content such as interview, analysis and "behind the scenes" programs)
- Eureka! HD (Science and technology-themed channel)
- GameWorld HD
- Horror HD (horror, thriller, & suspense programming)
- Seniors Life HD (programming for the 60+ yrs. crowd)
- The Wedding Channel (only non-HD channel) (weddings)
- Women's Sports HD (women's sports)
- W HD (lifestyle channel aimed at women 18–34)

== Resources ==
- High Fidelity HDTV Brings 20 IMAX Originals Titles to its Suite of HD Channels
- Canada’s Leading HD Broadcaster High Fidelity HDTV Signs Exclusive Deal with Smithsonian Networks
