= BBC Earth (Canadian TV channel) =

- Country: Canada
- Broadcast area: Canada
- Headquarters: Toronto, Ontario

Programming
- Picture format: 1080i HDTV

Ownership
- Owner: Blue Ant Media (branding licensed from BBC Studios)
- Sister channels: BBC First; Cottage Life; Love Nature; Makeful; Smithsonian Channel; T+E

History
- Launched: 5 September 2006; 20 years ago
- Former names: Rush HD (2006–2010) radX (2010–2017)

BBC Earth is a Canadian discretionary service channel owned by Blue Ant Media. It is a localized version of the international BBC Earth brand, which is licensed from BBC Studios, a subsidiary of the BBC. The channel broadcasts factual programming related to natural history and wildlife.

== History ==
In April 2006, John Panikkar (co-founder of the channel's original owner, High Fidelity HDTV), was granted a licence by the Canadian Radio-television and Telecommunications Commission (CRTC) to launch AHD (for Adrenaline HD), described as "a national, English-language Category 2 high definition (HD) specialty programming undertaking... that would focus on the impact of high definition imagery on high-octane, limit-defying human activity and adventure that tests individual personal limits, both physical and mental."

The channel launched on 5 September 2006 as Rush HD, with its name, and much of its programming, licensed from Rainbow Media, the owners of the Voom HD Networks, owners of the original Rush HD-branded channel in the United States.

Rush HD logo used from 2006 to 2010.

Like its American counterpart, Rush HD originally broadcast programming largely focused on high adventure and extreme sports such as snowboarding, windsurfing, bungee jumping, and cliff diving. Over a year after the American version shut down, Rush rebranded as radX on 23 August 2010. With the rebrand, programming was expanded to include a broader range of action-related programming such as feature films, outdoor lifestyle, travel, reality television, and other programming aimed primarily at men.

radX logo used from 2010 to 2017.

On 21 December 2011, radX's parent company, High Fidelity HDTV, announced that it had entered into an agreement to be purchased outright by Blue Ant Media, majority owners of Glassbox Television and minority owners of Quarto Communications. While initially purchasing 29.9% of the company, the remaining 70.1% was purchased after it was approved by the CRTC.

In December 2016, Blue Ant Media announced that it had reached an agreement with BBC Worldwide to rebrand radX as BBC Earth in January 2017, later confirmed officially as 23 January 2017. Blue Ant Media has had a history of partnerships with the BBC; Blue Ant's CEO Michael MacMillan assisted in launching BBC Canada whilst working for Alliance Atlantis. BBC Worldwide North America president Ann Sarnoff remarked that Blue Ant Media had a strong interest in factual programming, and that the timing of the launch would coincide with the then-upcoming North American premiere of Planet Earth II.
