= Craig Owens (disambiguation) =

Craig Owens is an American musician.

Craig Owens may also refer to:

- Craig Owens (critic), American gay activist, post-modernist art critic and feminist
- Craig Owens (author), American historian, author, fine art photographer, and television personality
- Craig Owens, a character in the science fiction TV show Doctor Who episodes "The Lodger" and "Closing Time" played by James Corden
