= Mustafa Gatollari =

American journalist, author, and paranormal investigator

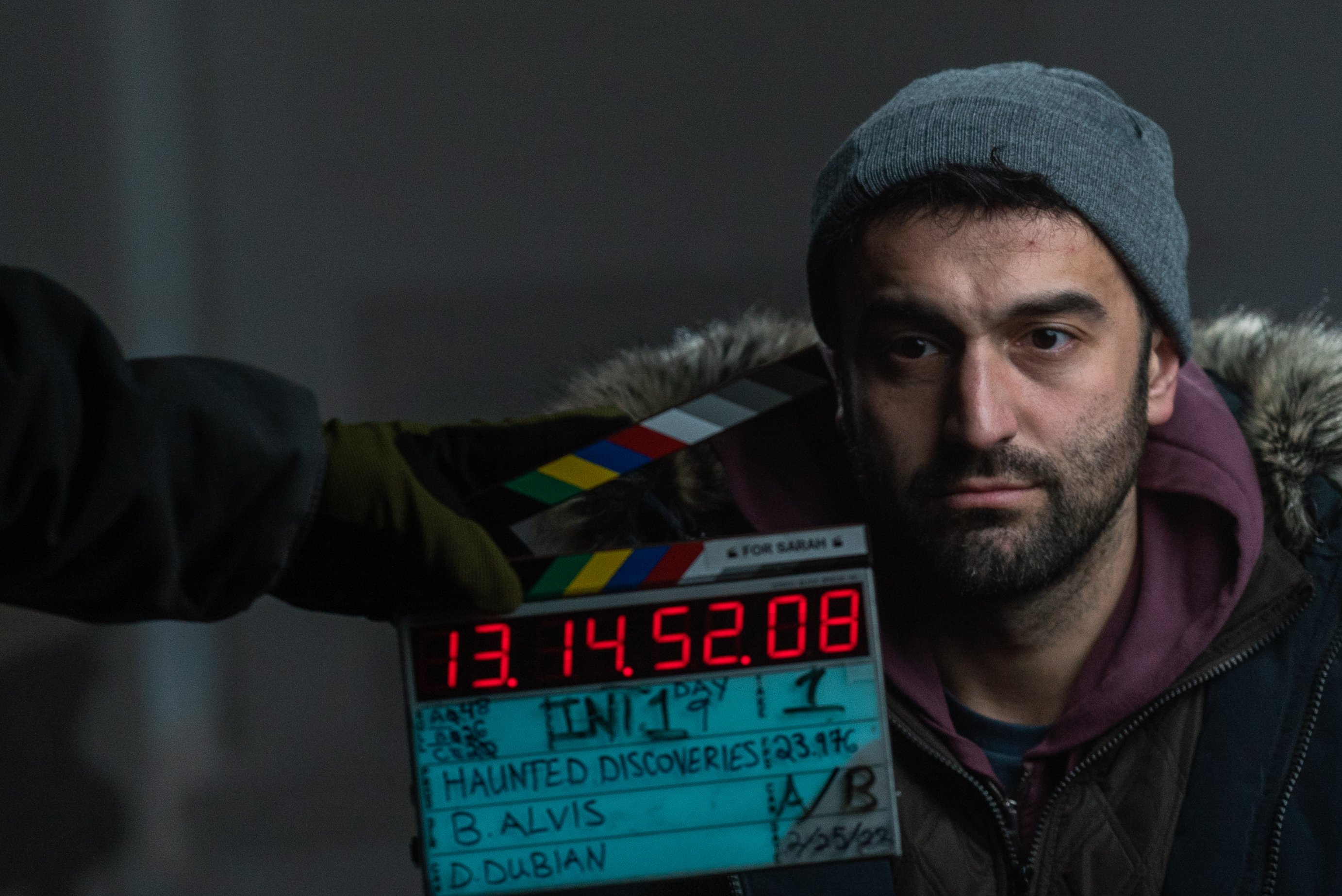
- Mustafa Gatollari on the set of Haunted Discoveries
- Born: Mustafa Gatollari; April 22, 1986 (age 40); Paterson, New Jersey, U.S.
- Occupations: Paranormal investigator Actor; Television producer Author
- Website: www.haunteddiscoveries.com

Mustafa Gatollari (born April 29, 1986) is an American paranormal investigator, actor, author, and journalist. He is a co-producer, and co-lead investigator for the television series Haunted Discoveries, which currently airs on Canada's T+E network in 2023. Before that, he was a paranormal historian and site analyst on the A&E Ghost Hunters reboot from 2019 to 2020.

== Early life ==
Mustafa Gatollari was born in Paterson, New Jersey, on April 29, 1986. His parents are Albanian immigrants.

According to the autobiographical section of his book, Elements of a Haunting: Connecting History with Science to Uncover the Greatest Ghost Stories Ever Told, Gatollari's awareness of the paranormal happened after his family moved to a house in New City when he was four years old. "My interest in the field began like every haunted house horror movie... We left our congested apartment in Lodi, New Jersey, after my father got the house [in New City] for a steal. For some reason (it was haunted), no one had wanted to buy it for five years despite the excellent school ratings and size of the home and yard."

While living in New City, the Gatollari family fell into economic hardship, which they blamed on the spirit energy inhabiting their home. Despite what he described his own paranormal experiences inside the house, Mustafa believed that other factors caused his family's struggles. "I was always, always skeptical when it came to the paranormal... I didn't want people to blame their problems on supernatural forces as my family did. But the more I investigated, the more fascinated I became with my past experiences...But I didn't believe, or I just couldn't believe that ghosts were real."

== Career ==
After graduating from high school, Gatollari attended Rutgers University. He had also joined a New Jersey–based paranormal investigation team. Mustafa claims that over ten years, he investigated more than 80 locations consisting of private homes, abandoned factories, shopping centers, and "parking garage in Eastern Europe that had been built over a mass gravesite."

Mustafa Gatollari began writing as a journalist for Distractify in 2015. Many of his articles cover the paranormal genre. He has also acted in several film and TV projects from 2008 to 2021. Credits include MacGyver, The Blacklist, and Nightbirds (2021).

In 2019, Gatollari became the paranormal historian and site analyst for a new incarnation of Ghost Hunters that aired on A&E. After the series ended in 2020, he and Ghost Hunters co-investigator Brandon Alvis wrote Elements of a Haunting: Connecting History with Science to Uncover the Greatest Ghost Stories Ever Told, published by Llewelyn Press in 2022.

Following the release of their book, Alvis and Gatollari partnered with Stargazer Television to produce and star in Haunted Discoveries (2023), a paranormal docu-series that explores haunted historic landmarks in Kentucky.

The first season aired in October 2023 on the T+E network in Canada.

Gatollari told Collider, "Like many investigators, Brandon and I have talked about all the things we wish we could see in a paranormal series and now we’re able to make that happen. I know in this era of faux-positivity it sounds corny to say this, but this show is a dream come true..."

== See also ==
- Ghost hunting
- List of reportedly haunted locations
- Paranormal television
