= Brandon Alvis =

American filmmaker and author

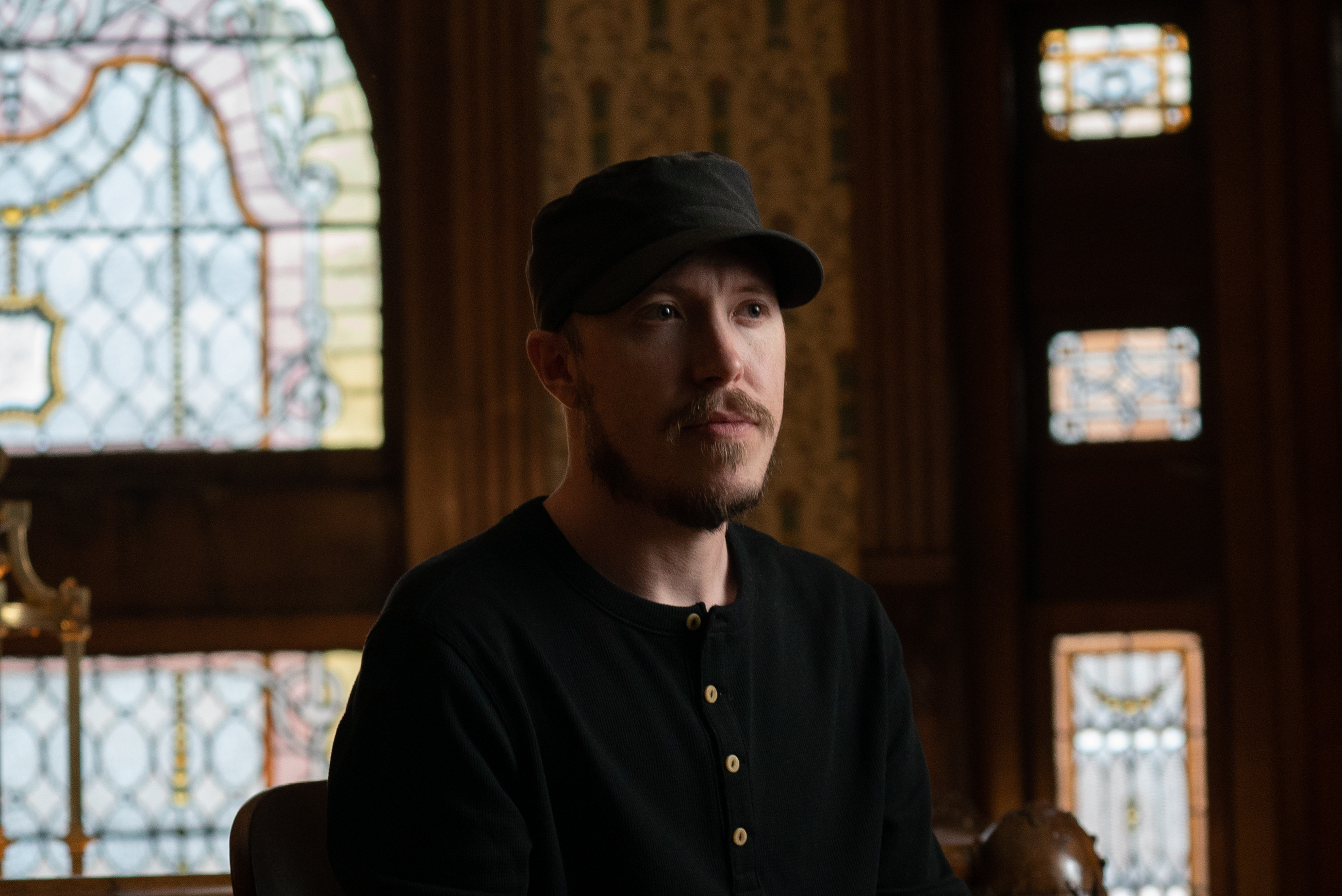
- Brandon Alvis on the set of Haunted Discoveries
- Born: Brandon Josef Alvis; June 22, 1987 (age 39); Bakersfield, California, U.S.
- Occupations: Television director Paranormal investigator Television host Television producer Author
- Organization: American Paranormal Research Association (APRA)
- Website: www.brandonjalvis.com

Brandon Alvis (born June 22, 1987) is an American paranormal investigator, filmmaker, and television personality. He is known for directing, co-producing, and co-leading the series Haunted Discoveries, which currently airs on Canada's T+E network, and his earlier role as a co-investigator and technician on the A&E reboot of Ghost Hunters (2019–2021).

== Early life ==
Brandon Alvis was born on June 22, 1987, in Bakersfield, California. He developed an early interest in ghost stories and paranormal folklore, which later evolved into a more focused interest in the paranormal following the deaths of two of his brothers—one from cancer in 1995 and another by suicide in 2004. In his book Elements of a Haunting, Alvis describes immersing himself in paranormal literature before beginning his career in conducting field investigations.

== Career ==
At age 17, Alvis worked as a stagehand and sound technician at the Buck Owens Crystal Palace in Bakersfield, California.

He later founded the American Paranormal Research Association (APRA), a group focused on investigating claims of paranormal activity at historical sites. According to Alvis, he has conducted investigations at over 200 locations.

In 2017, Alvis produced a short YouTube series titled Ephemera, which explored overlooked aspects of California history.

He subsequently directed the documentary Cemetery Park, which premiered at the 2019 Santa Barbara International Film Festival. The film examines the City of Ventura's controversial repurposing of a historic cemetery site as a dog park.

That same year, Alvis joined the cast of the A&E reboot of Ghost Hunters as the team's paranormal technician, a role he held until the series concluded in 2021.

In 2022, he co-authored Elements of a Haunting: Connecting History with Science to Uncover the Greatest Ghost Stories Ever Told with fellow investigator Mustafa Gatollari.

In October 2024, Alvis purchased the historic Dr. Jefferson Polk House in Perryville, Kentucky, a contributing property to the Perryville Historic District listed on the National Register of Historic Places. The home itself has connections to the American Civil War Battle of Perryville. He established the site as the Dr. J.J. Polk House Museum and Paranormal Research Center. Alvis expressed interest in collaborating with local organizations to preserve the property and promote its historical and cultural significance.

== Haunted Discoveries ==
In 2023, Alvis and Mustafa Gatollari co-founded A & G Creative and partnered with Stargazer Television to produce Haunted Discoveries, a paranormal docuseries exploring reportedly haunted historical locations across Kentucky. The series airs on Canada's T+E network. Its goal is to emphasize a scientific and historically grounded approach to paranormal investigation, avoiding the genre's common tropes in favor of documentary-style research.

In 2024, Alvis produced, directed, and appeared in the spin-off, Haunted Discoveries: Family Spirits, which debuted on T+E on March 16, 2025. The spin-off centers on individuals who believe they are haunted by a deceased family member or ancestor.

== See also ==
- Paranormal television
- Ghost hunting
- List of reportedly haunted locations
