= The alt.sessions =

- Genre: Music
- Country of origin: Canada
- Original language: English
- No. of seasons: 1
- No. of episodes: 6

Production
- Running time: 30 minutes

Original release
- Network: aux.tv BiteTV
- Release: December 1, 2008 – present

the alt.sessions is a Canadian television series, capturing bands playing alternative versions of their songs in a unique and meaningful setting. It was launched on aux.tv, a Canadian music website, and BiteTV, a digital cable channel, in late 2008 and currently airs on both.

The show aims to profile new and emerging artists in alternative rock, hip hop, indie rock, alternative country and other genres.

== Episodes ==
Air Date	Bands
December 1, 2008	Spiral Beach, Grand Analog
December 14, 2008	Will Currie and the Country French, Entire Cities
February 9, 2009	The Coast, Arkells
March 23, 2009	Shad, One Hundred Dollars
April 13, 2009	Zeus, The Golden Dogs
May 4, 2009	Said The Shark, Andrew Cole
June 25, 2009	The Cliks, Modernboys Moderngirls
August 10, 2009	Steamboat, Young Rival
