= Haunted Discoveries =

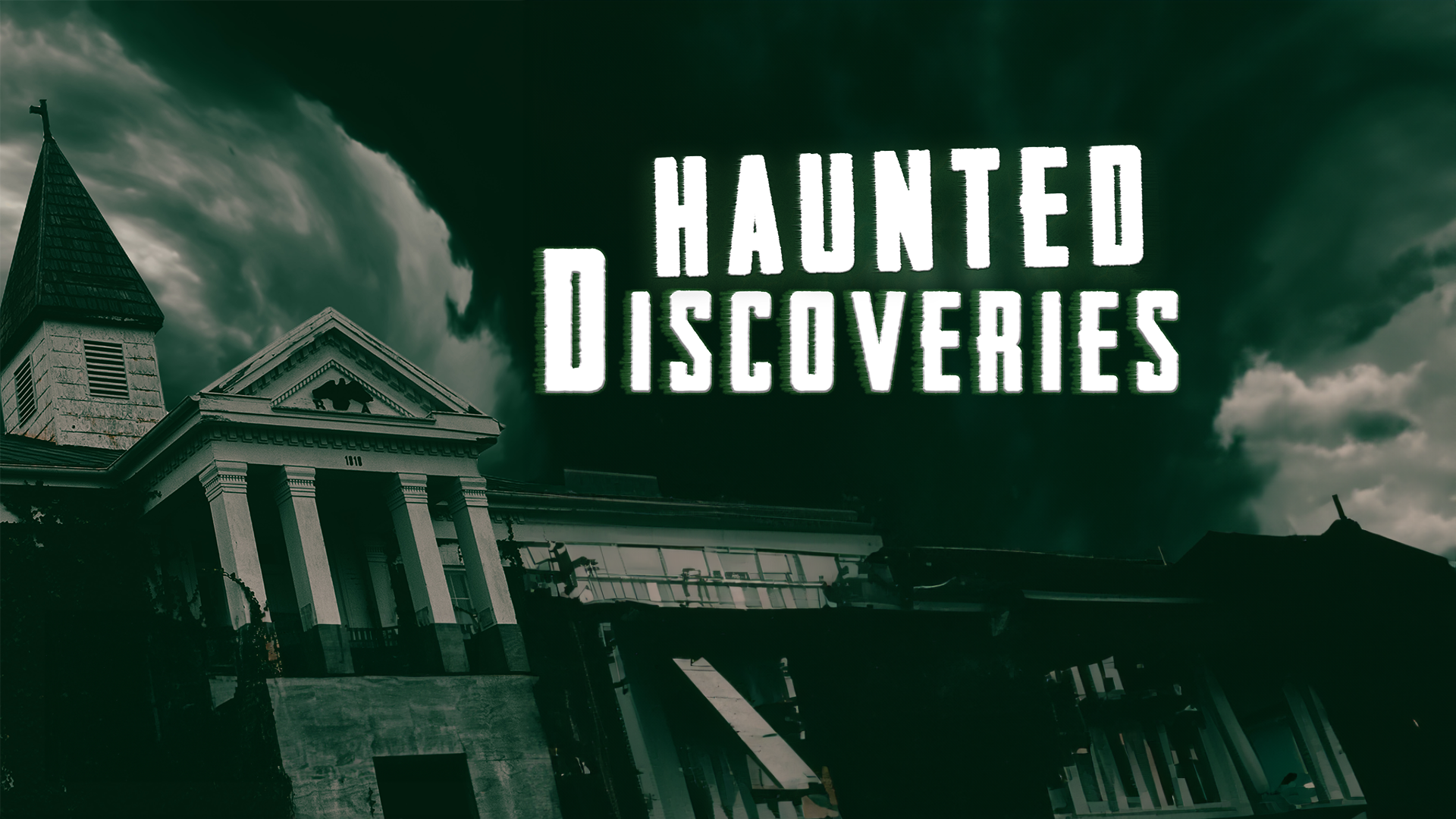
- Title card used in season 1, depicting Bethlehem Academy
- Genre: Paranormal; Reality Show; Documentary
- Starring: Brandon Alvis (2022–present); Mustafa Gatollari (2022–present); Kevin Otte (2022–present); Craig Owens (2024-present); Harry Kloor (2022–present); Malia Miglino (2022–2024)
- Composer: Fantom
- Country of origin: United States
- Original language: English
- No. of seasons: 4
- No. of episodes: 44

Production
- Executive producers: Shane O'Brien; Zach O'Brien
- Production location: United States
- Running time: 44 minutes
- Production companies: Stargazer Television and A & G Creative

Original release
- Network: T+E (2023)
- Release: October 6, 2023 – present

Related
- Ghost Hunters (2004–present); Ghost Hunters International (2009–2012); Expedition Unknown (2007–2012); Ghost Mine (2013); Paranormal Lockdown (2016–2019); Fact or Faked: Paranormal Files (2010–2012)

Haunted Discoveries is an American paranormal and documentary television series. It premiered in North America on October 6, 2023, on T+E as part of the Canadian network's "Creep Week" Halloween programming.

The series features former Ghost Hunters alumni Brandon Alvis, founder of the American Paranormal Research Association (APRA), and Mustafa Gatollari. Other investigators include Kevin Otte, Craig Owens, Malia Miglino, and noted scientist Harry Kloor.

== Premise ==
The series follows a team of APRA paranormal investigators led by Alvis and Gatollari, who investigate haunted locations in Kentucky and Illinois to see if they can document evidence using scientific methodology. The style of the TV series has a more documentary focus and cinematic feel as it highlights "both the paranormal evidence and the historical significance" of alleged haunted locations.

== Production ==
Haunted Discoveries originally started production in early 2022 as an eight-episode paranormal TV series that investigated historical locations in Kentucky. These locations include the Grand Victorian Inn in Park City, the Hall Place Bed & Breakfast in Glasgow, and the Old Talbott Tavern in Bardstown.

Following the completion of the eight episodes, Alvis and Gatollari announced in June 2022 that they would begin filming season two with all new locations.

In 2023, T+E licensed the rights to air the series in Canada.

== Team ==
=== Current members ===
- Brandon Alvis – lead investigator/producer/APRA Founder (2021–present)
- Mustafa Gatollari – co-lead investigator, producer, researcher (2021–present)
- Kevin Otte – Investigator, producer (2021–present)
- Craig Owens - Historical researcher, investigator (2024–present)
- Malia Miglino – Historical researcher (2021–2024)
- Harry Kloor – Scientist, consultant, investigator (2021–present)

== Series overview ==
Season	Episodes	Originally released	
Season	Episodes	First released	Last released
1	8	October 6, 2023	November 24, 2023
2	12	February 2, 2024	April 19, 2024
3	12	August 2, 2024	October 18, 2024
4	12	March 7, 2025	May 23, 2025

== Episodes ==
=== Season 1 (2023) ===
Season 1 aired from October 6 to November 24, 2023.

No. in season	Title	Original release date
1	"Gilded Age Ghosts"	October 6, 2023
The team captures shocking activity in Louisville, Kentucky, at the Conrad-Caldwell House, a Victorian-era home that's said to still be inhabited by some of its original owners.
2	"A Desperate Witch"	October 13, 2023
The team visits the Bourbon Inn in Louisville, Kentucky, and recreates an urban legend while researching its veracity in an attempt to conjure an entity reported by multiple witnesses.
3	"James Gang Ghosts"	October 20, 2023
The team spends the night in Bardstown, Kentucky, "the oldest Western stagecoach stop in America," to document the purported presence of its famed lingering guests, including the outlaw Jesse James.
4	"A Prisoner's Home"	October 27, 2023
The team documents a rare phenomenon in Bardstown, Kentucky, that attacks their senses and may be rooted in one of the Jailer's Inn's most tragic stories.
5	"The Anomaly"	November 3, 2023
The team conducts a long-form experiment with local researchers at Bethlehem Academy in Elizabethtown, Kentucky, that culminates in a chilling physical experience Brandon has in the "Moses Room."
6	"Home Sweet Haunt"	November 10, 2023
The team investigates if paranormal encounters experienced by both guests and owners at the Grand Victorian Inn in Park City, Kentucky, are tied to the railroad situated directly across from it.
7	"Civil War Spirits"	November 17, 2023
The team investigates the Old Stone Jail in Franklin, Kentucky, to see if its caretaker is manifesting activity by keeping its past alive.
8	"The Innkeeper"	November 24, 2023
The team returns to the Grand Victorian Inn in Park City, Kentucky, and discovers an unassuming bed and breakfast's activity may have more to do with a recently departed owner than its debunked historical claims.

=== Season 2 (2024) ===
Season 2 aired from February 2 to April 19, 2024.

No. in season	Title	Original release date
1	"Spirit Art"	February 2, 2024
The team captures astounding evidence that correlates with the claims that the Kentucky College of Art + Design's employees believe is tied to one of its original owners.
2	"Victorian Murder Mystery"	February 9, 2024
The team visits the historic DuPont mansion in Louisville, Kentucky, to investigate claims of haunted activity that may be related to a scandalous murder one of America's most prominent families covered up for decades.
3	"The Spirit Trap"	February 16, 2024
The team conducts the most thorough, empirical investigation to date of Octagon Hall in Franklin, Kentucky, and uncovers possible unmarked graves in the process.
4	"The Promise"	February 23, 2024
The team is at Hall Place in Glasgow, Kentucky, where they enlist the help of a respected medium to try and repeat the stunning results of one of their most emotional and significant investigations.
5	"Ghost Science"	March 1, 2024
The team heads to Somerset, Kentucky, to see if its unique geographic makeup plays a part in the purported hauntings occurring at an artist's collective.
6	"The Lost Grave"	March 8, 2024
The team works with a passionate homeowner who is laboring tirelessly to preserve the legacy of a purportedly haunted home in Manchester, Kentucky, and uncovers the lost grave of an eccentric past resident along the way.
7	"Ghosts of Perryville Pt.1"	March 15, 2024
The team visits the site of one of America's bloodiest Civil War Battles, documenting strange activity in a home where apparitions have been seen by longtime residents and visitors alike.
8	"Ghosts of Perryville Pt. 2"	March 22, 2024
The team conducts a split investigation, testing a possible correlation between two historical homes in Perryville, Kentucky, that witnessed unspeakable horrors.
9	"The Ancient Ones"	March 29, 2024
The team learns the Old Pioneer Jail's reported activity may predate the existence of prisoners who were subjected to horrific living conditions.
10	"The Epitaph"	April 5, 2024
The team unravels the local myth of a woman in white who roams the halls of a historic Opera House in Cynthiana, Kentucky.
11	"The Devil Effect"	April 12, 2024
The team sets out to debunk the myths clouding the reputation of Bobby Mackey's, America's Honky Tonk, in Wilder, Kentucky, and end up encountering something inexplicable.
12	"Secrets of the Grave"	April 19, 2024
The team investigates the isolated Benton farmhouse, a place tied to terrifying claims of a shapeshifter that latches on to people.

=== Season 3 (2024) ===
Season 3 aired from August 2 to October 18, 2024.

No. in season	Title	Original release date
1	"A Homecoming"	August 2, 2024
After the long-time caretakers of Waverly Hills returned to the historic tuberculosis hospital, APRA is invited to investigate claims of the "homecoming effect" – as paranormal activity reports spiked upon their re-entry into the building.
2	"The Seer"	August 9, 2024
The team meets with a living descendant of the original owner of Rose Mont, a historic Tennessee thoroughbred horse farm, to see if multiple generations of his ancestors are behind its purported ghostly activity.
3	"End of the Line"	August 16, 2024
APRA explores the dark past and violent paranormal claims of Brushy Mountain – Tennessee's first maximum security prison, which earned the ominous moniker of "End of the Line".
4	"Angel of Death"	August 23, 2024
The team's exploration into hospital phenomena brings them to Harriman, Tennessee, where a site recently acquired by a tight-knit group of longtime investigators is being visited by individuals attempting to reconnect with their deceased loved ones.
5	"Mountain Justice"	August 30, 2024
The caretakers of Scott County Jail in Huntsville, Tennessee, have transformed the historic structure into a paranormal research center – could the building's link to brutal mob killings be related to its supernatural claims?
6	"The Evidence"	August 31, 2024
The team engages in a roundtable discussion, highlighting their most shocking finds and a bevy of never-before-seen footage from past cases.
7	"Terror on Black Mountain Pt. 1"	September 7, 2024
The team investigates three ghostly hotspots in Benham, Kentucky, to determine if Bloody Harlan's dark history is manifesting in supernatural ways.
8	"Terror on Black Mountain Pt. 2"	September 7, 2024
The team ventures into Portal 31 Coal Mine, where they attempt to capture evidence of the "Lantern Man" apparition others have claimed to witness.
9	"Bloody Harlan"	September 27, 2024
APRA inspects the Harlan County Courthouse to assess if its paranormal claims are tied to the killing of a known murderer who was gunned down mid-trial.
10	"Lion of White Hall"	October 4, 2024
The screams of a long-forgotten, but legendary American figure, Cassius Clay, still echo through White Hall, and the team investigates his historic home in Richmond, Kentucky, to see if the "Lion" remains.
11	"Dead Lineage"	October 11, 2024
The team explores the history of an Old Louisville home where nearly every member of the enigmatic Brennan family passed away.
12	"Heart of the Haunting"	October 18, 2024
With new insight into the Kentucky Anomaly and a bevy of freshly compiled evidence of paranormal phenomena, the team returns to the Conrad Caldwell Museum in Louisville, where they try to contact another subset of spirits thought to inhabit the building.

=== Season 4 (2025) ===
Season 4 aired from March 7 to May 23, 2025.

No. in season	Title	Original release date
1	"Stone Cold Justice"	March 7, 2025
APRA returns to the Jailer's Inn in Bardstown, Kentucky, to corroborate evidence of their previously stunning find: an uncanny mass that affects the environment and sickens those who encounter it.
2	"Paranormal Preservation"	March 14, 2025
The haunted history of Diamond Point has captivated investigators for years. After learning a recently departed child psychologist has ties to the Harrodsburg, Kentucky, building, APRA investigates it to assess his possible role in its phenomena.
3	"The Cave"	March 21, 2025
The Karric-Parks house has bewildered APRA with its shocking activity, prompting further intrigue into historic Perryville. The team enlists the help of a renowned geologist to assess if a cave behind the home contributes to its hauntings.
4	"Bragg's Headquarters"	March 28, 2025
APRA delves into the Crawford House in Danville, Kentucky, which was once General Braxton Bragg's headquarters. After meeting with a former resident of the historic location, they're thrust into a night of chilling activity, culminating in an unprecedented find.
5	"Lifeline"	April 4, 2025
The Mayor of West Point, Kentucky, collaborates with APRA to aid in their investigation of the picturesque riverside town. Implementing thorough research, the team assesses activity in two haunted locations: the Lynch House and Hardy Hotel.
6	"The Eclipse"	April 11, 2025
APRA conducts its most ambitious investigation to date: a full-scale paranormal experiment during a once-in-a-lifetime eclipse in two West Point, Kentucky, paranormal hotspots rife with claims: Fort Duffield and the Ditto House.
7	"Faith of My Father"	April 18, 2025
APRA's initial investigation at Bethlehem Academy in Elizabethtown, Kentucky, yielded groundbreaking results. Now, they return to explore connections to further residents along with its current owner, Vincent, who maintains the building to honor his late wife.
8	"Offerings For Addy"	April 25, 2025
An active Masonic Lodge welcomes APRA to investigate the ghostly claims members have made over the years. But are visitors manifesting a particular phenomenon, tied to a young girl named Addy, through constant gifts and benefactions?
9	"Spiritual Retreat Pt. I"	May 2, 2025
APRA conducts a long-form investigation in historic Rugby, Tennessee, a Utopian society established by world-renowned author Thomas Hughes. A confluence of events leads them to repeat encounters with a past entity who met a heart-wrenching end.
10	"Spiritual Retreat Pt. II"	May 9, 2025
APRA's continued exploration of Rugby yields even further encounters with a specific entity. Soon, it becomes clear their investigation is the missing piece of a puzzle after past evidence from docents confirms the spirit of the boy they've encountered.
11	"The Ledger"	May 16, 2025
The living descendant of a beloved Harlan, Kentucky figure joins APRA's investigation of the Eversole building. While earnestly seeking the advice of his forefather, the team documents uncanny communication from beyond the grave.
12	"The Dead On The Hill"	May 23, 2025
What began as a search for a woman in white in a long-abandoned coal miner's lodging in Harlan, Kentucky, resulted in corroborating evidence of cryptozoological phenomena. This shocking find will reshape paranormal research forever.
