= BBC First (Canadian TV channel) =

- BBC First logo
- Country: Canada
- Broadcast area: Nationwide
- Headquarters: Toronto, Ontario

Ownership
- Owner: High Fidelity HDTV (2006–2013); Blue Ant Media (branding licensed from BBC Studios) (2013–present)
- Sister channels: BBC Earth; Cottage Life; Love Nature; Makeful; Smithsonian Channel; T+E

History
- Launched: 12 March 2006; 20 years ago
- Former names: Treasure HD (2006–2011); HIFI (2011–2021)

Links
- Website: BBC First

BBC First is a Canadian English-language high definition discretionary television channel owned by Blue Ant Media. It is a localized version of the international BBC First service, which broadcasts a variety of drama, comedy, and film programming originating primarily from the BBC.

== History ==
In August 2005, John S. Panikkar (co-founder of the channel's original owner, High Fidelity HDTV), was granted a licence by the Canadian Radio-television and Telecommunications Commission (CRTC) to launch ArtefactHD, described as "a national English-language Category 2 high definition (HD) specialty programming undertaking... devoted to collectors and their collections, and would showcase creations, celebrate beauty, intricacy, aesthetics and the merits of an object for its own sake. The programming would also include tours of museums and galleries open to the public and behind-the-scenes, celebrate unique architecture and design, and highlight the dedication and knowledge of the committed collector."

The channel launched on 12 March 2006 as Treasure HD. Much of its programming was purchased and its name licensed from Rainbow Media, original owners of the now defunct Voom HD Networks, who owned the originating Treasure HD in the United States. Like its American counterpart, the channel originally broadcast factual programming on primarily collectibles, artifacts, and other art-based programming. Programming included such programs as Secrets of the Exhibit, Art in Progress, Treasure Divers, and Romance in Stone. When the American channel, Treasure HD, ceased broadcasting in 2009, the Canadian channel broadened its programming to include music (primarily focusing on the classic rock, jazz, classical music genres) and films.

The channel was rebranded as HIFI in August 2011. The rebranded channel would put an emphasis on music and art-based programming, including films, exemplified by its slogan, music+art. On 21 December 2011, HIFI's parent company, High Fidelity HDTV, announced that it had entered into an agreement to be purchased outright by Blue Ant Media, majority owners of Glassbox Television and minority owners of Quarto Communications. While initially purchasing 29.9% of the company, the remaining 70.1% was purchased after CRTC approval.

Blue Ant announced in March 2021 that the channel would be rebranded as a Canadian version of BBC First on 16 March. The relaunch was an expansion of Blue Ant Media's partnership with BBC Studios, which saw sibling channel radX relaunch as a Canadian version of BBC Earth in 2017.

== Programming ==
Though the BBC First brand is primarily dedicated to scripted programming, the Canadian version also carries unscripted, factual, and reality programming, as well as reruns of shows from Blue Ant's programming libraries to fulfill Canadian content requirements. BBC First effectively succeeds the now-defunct BBC Canada channel, carrying several programs previously seen on the latter (such as Top Gear and Antiques Roadshow), while continuing to air The Graham Norton Show, which had already moved to the channel in 2018 prior to its relaunch.

By mid-2024, the channel had begun devoting a large portion of its schedule to British-produced game shows, such as The Chase, Impossible, and the British and (UK-recorded) Australian versions of Wheel of Fortune and Jeopardy!.

== Logos ==
2006-2008	2008-2011	2011–2021	2021–present
