= Aux Weekly =

- Genre: Music
- Country of origin: Canada
- Original language: English
- No. of seasons: 2
- No. of episodes: 94

Production
- Executive producer: Cullen Fairfield
- Producer: Jordan Delic
- Production location: National

Original release
- Network: Aux
- Release: 2008 – 2011

Aux Weekly is a Canadian television series that focused on the latest headlines in music and entertainment news. Viewers were given an in depth look into the headlines that matter in the world of music. Hosted by Andrew Alba, Melissa Hetu and Barry Taylor, the show explored musical trends and events from indie rockers to the latest chart toppers. Aux Weekly aired on Aux. During its run, Aux Weekly was the only music-magazine program airing in Canada and became a staple for artist interviews and performances.

== Location ==
The first season of the show was shot on location in Toronto, Ontario, Canada. During the shows second season, locations expanded to cities across Canada, The United States and overseas.

== History ==
Aux Weekly was launched in October 2009 on AUX TV the channel. The show began as a one-hour, host-centered, music-magazine program, produced by Mel Francombe. The show originally contained host segments, music videos, interview packages, 420 Snack, in-studio performances and a recap of the week's music news. These segments became staples of the show in one form or another for the series' run, but the show quickly was changed to a thirty-minute format as music videos were dropped.

By episode 16 of the first season, Jordan Delic took over as producer, and the show slowly streamlined its content. Host segments were reduced, a new intro and graphics were created, and segments were changed. The focus on the show modified to concentrate more on artist and band interviews and performances, as opposed to extended host segments.

For the second season the show was given a facelift, with new graphics and theme song by The Arkells in "Pullin' Punches." Host segments were dropped entirely, and replaced with more interview and performance segments. The shows weekly news segments was enlarged to quickly round up of the week's biggest music stories. Shows generally featured six packages, five interviews and one performance, which would take place in a different, unexpected location.

== Aux Weekly Hosts/Contributors ==
=== Andrew Alba ===
Andrew Alba began working for the channel in June 2008. In just a year, Andrew's love of music quickly upped this self-proclaimed music junkie from intern to music coordinator to co-host of AUX Weekly. Andrew attended Ryerson University for sound engineering.

=== Melissa Hetu ===
Melissa Hetu is no stranger to the music industry. Melissa has a BA in Broadcast Journalism from Concordia University and hosted "We.Are.Canadian" on PunkRadioCast and CJLO for 2 years. Before her duties as co-host, she was in the field of tour managing. Melissa recently relocated from Montreal to Toronto.

=== Barry Taylor ===
Barry Taylor is a former Toronto radio DJ, acknowledged for his role in breaking some of Canada's top indie acts including City and Colour, Alexisonfire, Bedouin Soundclash, and Ill Scarlett. Chris Cornell, Dave Grohl, Kings of Leon, and Silversun Pickups are some of the artists that Taylor has interviewed over the years.
