= Smithsonian Channel (Canada) =

- Smithsonian Channel Logo
- Country: Canada
- Broadcast area: Nationwide
- Headquarters: Toronto, Ontario

Programming
- Language: English
- Picture format: 1080i (HDTV)

Ownership
- Owner: Blue Ant Media (93.33%) (2013–present); Smithsonian Networks (Skydance Corporation) (6.67%)
- Sister channels: BBC Earth; BBC First; Cottage Life; Love Nature; Makeful; T+E

History
- Launched: September 5, 2006, 18 years ago
- Former names: Equator HD (2006–2010) eqhd (2010–2013)

Links
- Website: Smithsonian Channel

Availability

Streaming media
- RiverTV: Over-the-top TV

Smithsonian Channel is a Canadian pay television channel, owned and operated by Blue Ant Media. Smithsonian Networks, a subsidiary of Paramount Skydance Corporation’s MTV Entertainment Group division, owners of the American channel of the same name from which its brand and programming is licensed, serve as a minority partner. The channel broadcasts factual programming on categories such as air and space, science and nature, pop culture, and history.

== History ==
In April 2006, John S. Panikkar (co-founder of the channel's original owner, High Fidelity HDTV), was granted a licence by the Canadian Radio-television and Telecommunications Commission (CRTC) to launch MeridianHD, described as "a national, English-language Category 2 high definition (HD) specialty programming undertaking... that would consist of programs dedicated exclusively to the exploration of geography, people, places and cultures. The programming would focus on the roots of human development as well as teachings from other cultures and traditions in Canada and around the world. It would also focus on what impact human behaviour has on the natural environment and how the natural world affects human ritual and culture. The proposed service would not offer celebrity biographies or staged events."

Equator HD logo (2006–2010)

The channel launched on September 5, 2006 as Equator HD. Its brand was licensed and much of its programming was purchased from Rainbow Media, original owners of the now defunct Voom HD Networks, owners of Equator HD in the United States. The channel broadcast factual programming relating to geography, people, and cultures such as The Bee Travelers, Earth Diaries, The Last Chapter of the Vietnam War, and Eurasian Empires.

eqhd logo (2010-2013)

Upon the closure of the American service of the same name in 2009, High Fidelity HDTV rebranded the channel as eqhd on August 23, 2010., focusing largely on the same genre of programming.

On December 21, 2011, High Fidelity HDTV, announced that it had entered into an agreement to be purchased outright by Blue Ant Media, majority owners of Glassbox Television and minority owners of Quarto Communications. While initially purchasing 29.9% of the company, the remaining 70.1% will be purchased once it is approved by the CRTC.

On July 15, 2013, it was announced that Blue Ant Media had reached a deal to rebrand eqhd as a Canadian version of Smithsonian Channel. Smithsonian Channel launched on November 13, 2013. In 2016, Smithsonian Channel US bought a minority stake in the channel.
