= Love Nature =

Canadian-based English language television channel

- Country: Canada
- Headquarters: Toronto, Ontario

Programming
- Picture format: 4K UHD; 1080i (HDTV)

Ownership
- Owner: Blue Ant Media
- Sister channels: BBC Earth; BBC First; Cottage Life; Makeful; Smithsonian Channel; T+E

History
- Launched: 12 March 2006; 20 years ago
- Former names: Oasis HD (2006–2014); Oasis (2014–2015)

Links
- Website: tv.lovenature.com

Availability

Terrestrial
- (Malaysia) Astro: Channel 550 (HD)
- (Malaysia) NJOI: Channel 550 (HD)
- (Singapore) Singtel TV: Channel 215 (HD)

Streaming media
- (Malaysia) Astro: Astro Go

Love Nature is a Canadian specialty television channel owned by Blue Ant Media. Originally launched on March 12, 2006, the channel broadcasts documentaries and television series related to wildlife and nature.

Outside of Canada, international versions have been owned by Rock Entertainment Holdings and Smithsonian Networks.

Love Nature Logo (2015-2025)

== History ==
In August 2005, John S. Panikkar (co-founder of the channel's original owner, High Fidelity HDTV), was granted a licence by the Canadian Radio-television and Telecommunications Commission (CRTC) to launch OasisHD, described as "a national English-language Category 2 high definition specialty programming undertaking... featuring urban and wild landscapes by Canadian and international cinematographers."

The channel launched in Canada on March 12, 2006, as Oasis HD, focusing on wildlife and nature programming, similar to its current format.

On December 21, 2011, High Fidelity HDTV announced that it had entered into an agreement to be purchased outright by Blue Ant Media. While initially purchasing 29.9% of the company, the remaining 70.1% would be purchased once it is approved by the CRTC.

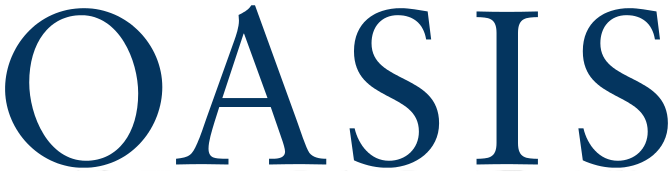
Logo as Oasis from 2014 to 2015.

In the summer of 2014, the channel dropped the "HD" moniker and was re-branded as Oasis with a revised logo and new website.

On January 19, 2015, Oasis relaunched as Love Nature. As part of the relaunch, Blue Ant Media announced plans to produce 200 hours of nature programming per-year in 4K Ultra HD.

== International ==
Love Nature (International)
- Country: Canada
- Broadcast area: Australia; East Asia (except China); Europe; Eswatini; Fiji; Guyana; India; Israel; Kenya; Latin America; Lesotho; Maldives; New Zealand; Qatar; Southeast Asia; Sri Lanka; South Africa; Suriname; Tajikistan; Turkey; United States; Zambia

Ownership
- Owner: Rock Entertainment Holdings (Asia); Smithsonian Networks (U.S)
- Sister channels: ZooMoo; Rock Entertainment; Rock Extreme (Taiwan only); Global Trekker; Golden Chinese Drama (Hong Kong only); Smithsonian Channel; Makeful; Outdoor Channel; Rock Action

Links
- Website: lovenature.com

Availability

Terrestrial
- Zuku TV (Kenya): Channel 410

On July 14, 2008, then owners High Fidelity HDTV, announced that it had reached an agreement with Cameron Thomson Group to distribute then Oasis HD, throughout Europe. Although the channel did not launch internationally as planned.

On December 14, 2015, Blue Ant Media and Smithsonian Networks jointly announced that it was partnering in a new joint venture called Blue Skye Entertainment, with the new company focusing on developing and distributing 4K Ultra HD wildlife and nature programming globally via Subscription Video on Demand (SVOD) and linear television services under the Love Nature brand and Smithsonian Networks' stand-alone streaming service, Smithsonian Earth. The new company's first product launch came with the launch of the Love Nature SVOD streaming service, which launched in 32 countries at launch, in February 2016.

The channel's first international linear television distribution agreement was signed with StarHub TV in Singapore in November 2016.

Since the global launch, the channel expanded to Europe, the United Kingdom and Ireland, Southeast Asia, Hong Kong, Macau, Taiwan, the Middle East and Africa. The channel was also launched as free ad-supported TV channels across the United States.
