= Frederic Vester =

German biochemist (1925–2003)

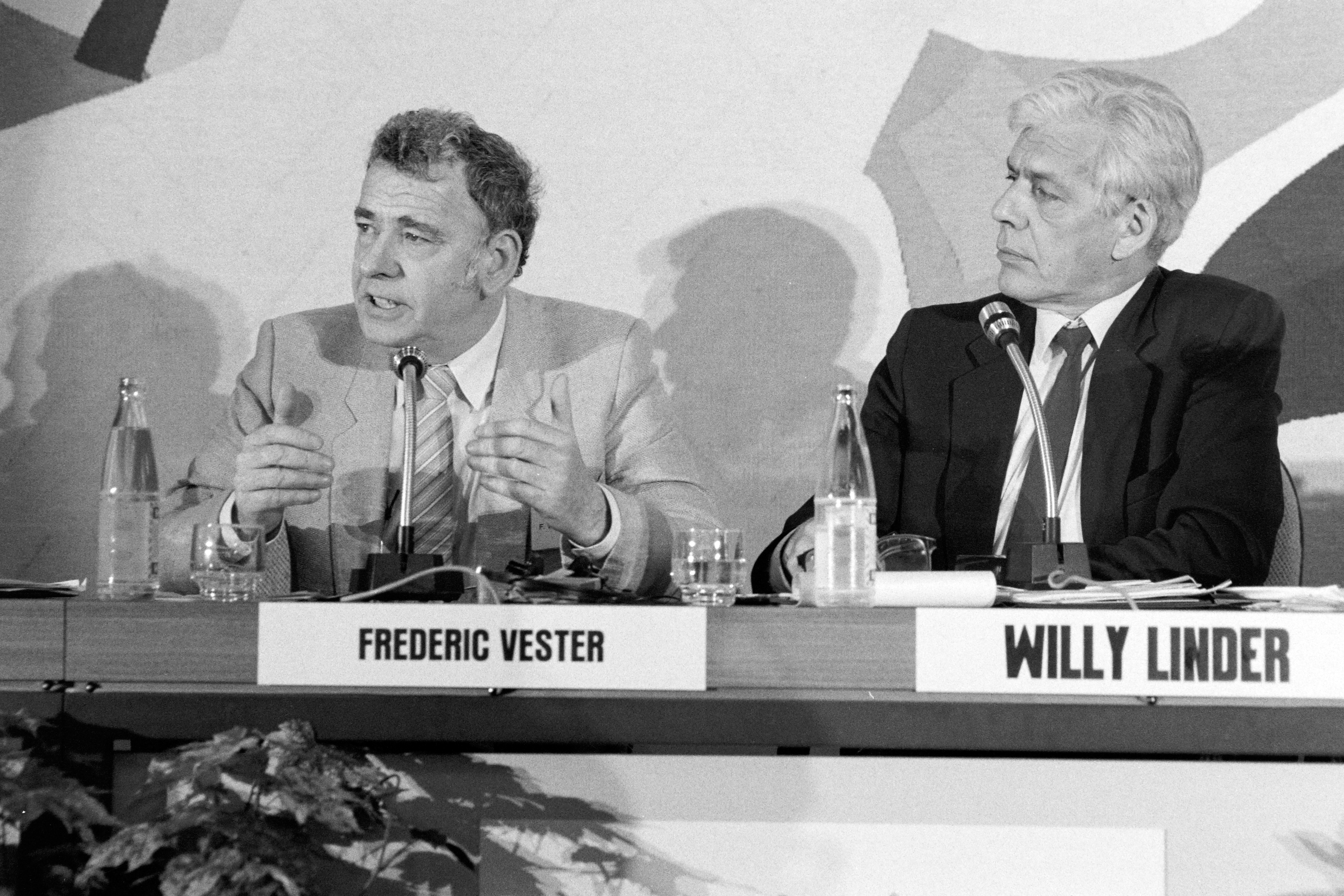
Image of Frederic Vester

Frederic Vester (November 23, 1925 – November 2, 2003) was a German biochemist, and an expert in the field of ecology.

== Biography ==
Vester was born in Saarbrücken, and studied chemistry at the universities of Mainz, Paris and Hamburg. From 1955 to 1957, he was postdoctoral fellow at Yale University, and Cambridge. From 1957 to 1966, he worked at Saarland University, Saarbrücken, and from 1969 he worked in Munich, first at the Max Planck Institute. In 1970, he founded the private Munich-based Frederic Vester Studiengruppe für Biologie und Umwelt GmbH ("Frederic Vester Study Group for Biology and Environment, Ltd.), renamed Frederic Vester GmbH ("Frederic Vester, Ltd.") after his death.

From 1982 to 1989, he was a professor at the University of the Bundeswehr Munich, and from 1989 to 1991, he was Professor for Applied Economics at the Hochschule St. Gallen, Switzerland. Vester's ideas influenced the formation of the environmental movement and the Green Party in Germany. He was a member of the Club of Rome. He was married to Anne Vester. The couple had three children and six grandchildren. He died in Munich.

== Work ==
=== Networked thinking ===
Vester was known as pioneer of networked thinking, a combination of cybernetic and systemic ideas and complexity. Central ideas of network thinking include viewing a system as a network of interrelated effects, leading to emergent behavior of the system as a whole. These networks can be described by using protocols, mathematical networks, computer software, so that even someone with the most basic understanding of networks will see relations, including positive and negative feedback loops. Simulations of systemic networks can help to decide the long-term effects of singular measures.

=== Sensitivity Model ===
Vester's Sensitivity Model combines these ideas, and has been used since the 1980s in studies by Ford, UNESCO and other organizations.

== Publications ==
Most of Vesters books were published in German as well as in other languages, though seldom in English. A list of his works includes:

- 1976, Ballungsgebiete in der Krise (Urban Systems in Crisis)
- 1979, Das Überlebensprogramm (Plan for Survival)
- 1982, Das kybernetische Zeitalter (The Cybernetic Age)
- 1985, Ein Baum ist mehr als ein Baum (A Tree is More than a Tree)
- 1990, Leitmotiv vernetztes Denken (Key Themes of Networked Thinking)
- 1991, Ausfahrt Zukunft: Strategien für den Verkehr von morgen (Gateway Future: Strategies for the Transportation of Tomorrow)
- 1999, Crashtest Mobilität (Crash Test Mobility)
- 2002, Aufmerksamkeit im Unterricht (Attentiveness in the Classroom)
- 2002, Neuland des Denkens (Uncharted Territory of Thought)
- 2002, Denken, Lernen, Vergessen (Thinking, Learning, Forgetting)
- 2002, Phänomen Stress (Phenomenon Stress)
- 2002, Unsere Welt - ein vernetztes System (Our World - A Networked System)
- 2007, The Art of interconnected Thinking. Ideas and Tools for Tackling Complexity (MCB) ISBN 3-939314-05-6

Vester is also the author of the software tool Sensitivity model and of several cybernetic games:

- 1997 Ecopolicy – das kybernetische Strategiespiel (Ecopolicy - The Cybernetic Strategy Game)
- 1980/1996 Ökolopoly. Ein kybernetisches Umweltspiel (Ecopoly - A Cybernetic Environment Game)
