= Craig Owens (author) =

American historian and paranormal researcher

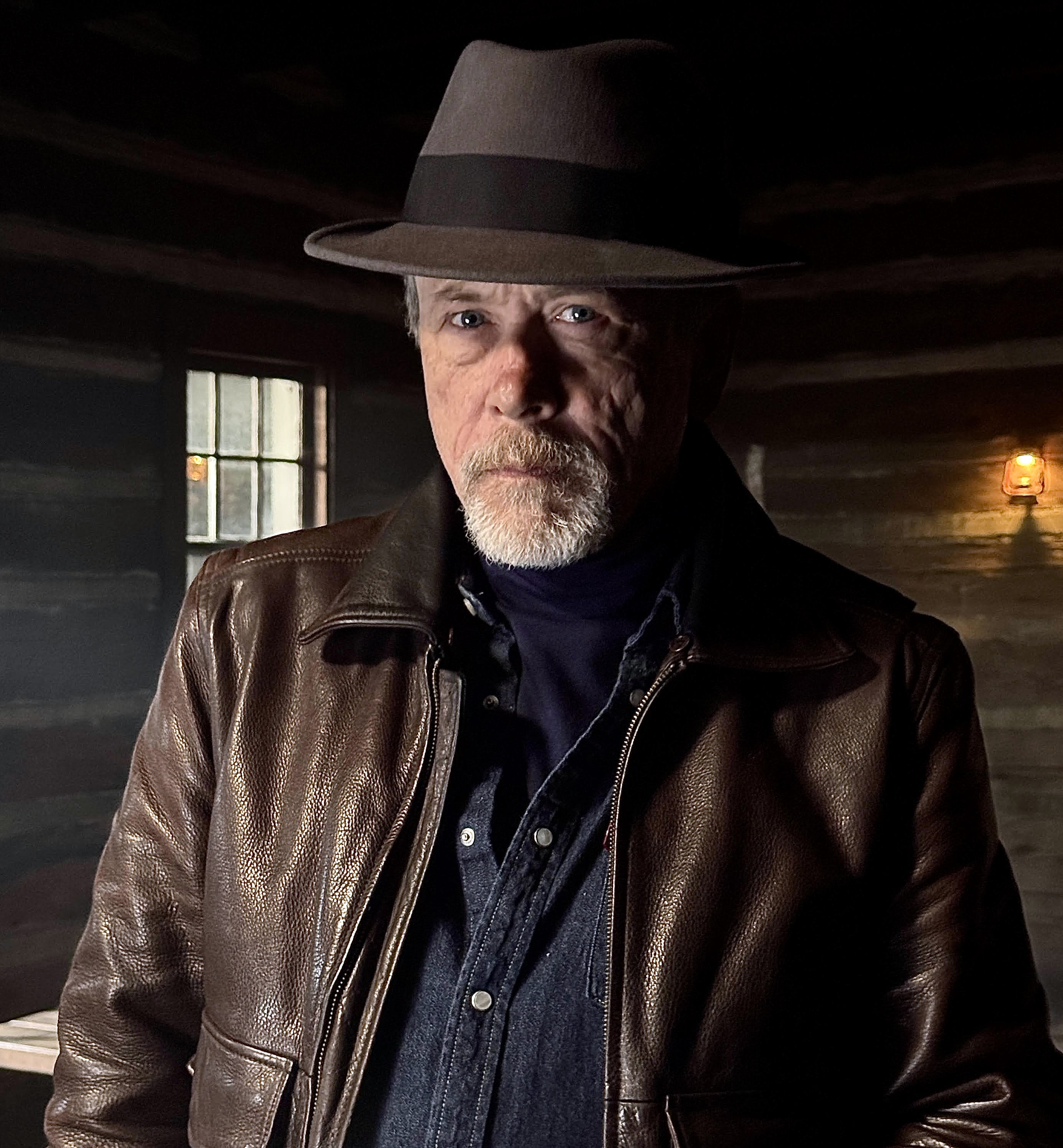
- Born: August 12, 1965 (age 61); Odessa, Texas, U.S.
- Occupations: Historian, author, photographer, television personality
- Notable work: Haunted Discoveries, Haunted by History Vol. 1
- Website: bizarrela.com

Craig Owens (born August 12, 1965) is an American historian, author, fine art photographer, and television personality. He is best known for his appearances on the television series Haunted Discoveries and Haunted Discoveries: Family Spirits and for his book Haunted by History Vol. 1.

== Early life and education ==
Jeffrey Craig Owens was born on August 12, 1965, in Odessa, Texas. During his early childhood, his family relocated to Columbus, Mississippi, where his mother became acquainted with Robert and Donna Snow, owners of the historic Waverley Mansion in West Point. Stories about the property, which was said to be haunted, sparked Owens's early interest in the paranormal, although he did not personally report any encounters.

As a teenager, Owens moved back to Odessa. In 1985, while attending Odessa College and working at a local television station, he lived in an apartment that was also reputed to be haunted. He later transferred to Southern Methodist University in Dallas, where he earned a Bachelor of Fine Arts in Communications with a focus on cinema in 1989.

== Career ==
Owens moved to Los Angeles in 1994 and worked in film and television production between 1996 and 2001. His credits include Trial and Error, Wag the Dog, Phone Booth, The Jamie Foxx Show, and the first two seasons of Gilmore Girls. From 2002 to 2005, he was employed by the Century City Chamber of Commerce, followed by a position as executive assistant at the International Cinematographers Guild (IATSE Local 600) from 2005 to 2009.

In 2010, Owens created the Facebook blog Bizarre Los Angeles, which focuses on lesser-known stories and figures from Hollywood's early history. Around the same time, he began producing stylized photography inspired by silent-era film stills, often shot in historic Los Angeles buildings.

His work has been featured in publications such as Los Angeles Magazine, and LA Downtown News, and he has appeared on CBS Los Angeles. and the Bizarre States podcast from Nerdist. Owens has also been invited to speak at public institutions such as the Los Angeles Public Library, the California Preservation Foundation, and the American Cinematheque.

Colin Dickey profiled Owens in a 2014 article for The Verge, and Dickey later writes about him in his book Ghostland: An American History in Haunted Places as an investigator who sees ghost hunting as a method of uncovering forgotten history.

In addition to his photography and writing, Owens is known as a property historian for several historic hotels in Southern California. He has researched and documented the histories of sites such as the Aztec Hotel in Monrovia, a Mayan Revival-style landmark listed on the National Register of Historic Places.

== Haunted by History ==
In 2009, during a 1920s-themed photo shoot at the Mission Inn Hotel & Spa in Riverside, California, Owens reported witnessing a shadow-like figure wearing a cowl, which he described as an apparition. He later credited the experience with renewing his interest in the relationship between history and paranormal folklore.

Following the event, Owens began researching the histories of Southern California hotels associated with ghost stories. He staged vintage-style photo shoots at several locations while compiling both historical records and local legends. In 2017, he published Haunted by History Vol. 1: Separating the Facts and Legends of Eight Historic Hotels and Inns in Southern California, which focused on the following eight sites:

- Hotel del Coronado
- Victorian Rose Bed & Breakfast
- Julian Gold Rush Hotel
- Mission Inn Hotel & Spa
- Alexandria Hotel
- Pierpont Inn
- Banning House Lodge
- Glen Tavern Inn

The book received a starred review from Publishers Weekly which praised its "dashes of visual humor, subtle sensuality, and haunting atmosphere." In 2020, it was also named to the Eric Hoffer Award Grand Prize Short List.

== Haunted Discoveries ==
In 2023, Owens joined the television series Haunted Discoveries: Family Spirits as its lead historical researcher.

In 2024, he joined the cast of the main series, Haunted Discoveries, as both a property historian and paranormal investigator.

== Personal life ==
Owens lives in Los Angeles and has three children.

== See also ==
- Paranormal television
- Ghost hunting
