= A.Side TV =

Defunct Canadian speciality music television channel

- Country: Canada
- Broadcast area: Canada
- Headquarters: Toronto, Ontario

Programming
- Picture format: 1080i HDTV (downscaled to letterboxed 480i for the SDTV feed)

Ownership
- Owner: Blue Ant Media

History
- Launched: October 1, 2009; 17 years ago
- Closed: January 15, 2023; 3 years ago
- Former names: AUX (2009-2017)

Links
- Website: tv.ontheaside.com

A.Side TV was a Canadian English language discretionary specialty channel owned by Blue Ant Media. Originally focusing on music and pop culture programming, the channel drifted towards generic true crime and paranormal programming before it wound down operations in mid-January 2023.

== History ==
=== As AUX (2009–2016) ===
Originating under the branding, AUX, the channel's origins begin in 2008 when original owners, Glassbox Television, launched both an AUX-branded website and a 2-hour programming block on sister channel BiteTV that focused on music-related programming featuring primarily independent, and new and emerging artists in alternative, hip hop, indie rock, indie pop and other similar genres. Both the website and the programming block launched on November 24, 2008.

Aux logo

In February 2009, AUX participated with CBC Radio 3 and Exclaim! to launch "X3", a new collaborative cross-promotional platform which saw all three outlets create content spotlighting a particular "Artist of the Month". X3 artists of the month have included K'naan, Malajube, Thunderheist, Japandroids, Apostle of Hustle and The Rural Alberta Advantage. The project ceased in 2012.

Glassbox Television received approval by the Canadian Radio-television and Telecommunications Commission (CRTC) to launch AUX as a national English-language category 2 specialty channel on March 6, 2009, describing the channel n regulatory documents as a service "devoted to emerging music and its creation, including programming featuring emerging music and aimed at helping emerging musicians." The channel was launched on October 1, 2009, exclusively on Rogers Cable (in Ontario and New Brunswick, and shortly thereafter in Newfoundland and Labrador). Later, other providers such as Shaw Cable, Shaw Direct, EastLink, and Source Cable launched the channel on their systems, eventually obtaining wide national distribution on most majors television providers in Canada.

In April 2010, the CRTC denied an application by Glassbox to launch a French-language version of AUX, as Astral Media had filed an intervention against the Glassbox application suggesting that the channel would be in competition with the established music video networks MusiquePlus and MusiMax.

On April 11, 2011, it was announced that Blue Ant Media would acquire a controlling interest in Glassbox Television. Blue Ant Media initially acquired a 29.9% stake in the company, with the option to expand their stake up to 75% which would give the company controlling interest. The company would later be purchased outright by Blue Ant Media in the summer of 2012.

On June 4, 2013, AUX launched a high definition feed.

=== As A.Side ===
On April 6, 2017, Blue Ant Media, along with Shed Creative Agency, announced that the channel would be rebranded A.Side TV, later confirmed to launch on May 30, 2017. The purpose of the rebrand was to align the channel with the newly formed multi-platform music brand, A.Side, which launched on May 18, 2017, and focuses on general pop music and pop culture content aimed at millennials, in particular, female millennials. Blue Ant Media continued to operate and fully own the channel, while Shed managed content for the A.Side website and social media platforms., though by the middle of 2020 those presences had gone inactive outside schedule updates.

In December 2022, Blue Ant announced that the channel would cease operations on January 15, 2023. Shortly after this, the channel space created in 2009 by Aux ceased to exist.

== Programming ==
Though still marketed as a music and pop culture service as of 2022, A.Side ended its run carrying unrelated reality series and documentary programming predominately centred around food, true crime, and the paranormal.

As AUX, the channel aired a mix of music-related programming in the form of music videos, docuseries, interviews and talk shows, and pre-taped live performances, among others. Original programming produced under the AUX brand included ExploreMusic with Alan Cross, Aux Weekly, Strange Notes (hosted by George Pettit of Alexisonfire), and the alt.sessions.
