= Cottage Life (magazine) =

Canadian magazine

- Editor: Michelle Kelly
- Categories: Cottaging, Lifestyle, Outdoor
- Frequency: Six issues a year
- Founded: 1988
- Company: Cottage Life Media Inc. (Blue Ant Media)
- Country: Canada
- Based in: Toronto
- Language: English
- Website: http://www.cottagelife.com/
- ISSN: 0838-2395

Cottage Life is a Canadian magazine focusing on cottage lifestyle content. First published in the summer of 1988, the publication features how-to articles, buying guides, and tips on aspects of cottage living and lifestyle.

Formally published by Quarto Communications, the magazine is currently owned by Cottage Life Media Inc., a subsidiary of Blue Ant Media.

== Spin-offs ==
The first extension of the Cottage Life brand was the Spring Cottage Life Show, which was first held in 1994 and has been held every spring since. In 2004, The Fall Cottage Life Show was launched to cater to the growing popularity of year-round cottaging.

In July 2011, Blue Ant Media purchased a 15% interest in Quarto Communications. Quarto was granted a license for a Category B service known as Cottage Life Television in November 2011, which would be focused on programming dealing with cottage communities and lifestyles. Four months after announcing its intent to acquire Bold, a re-brand of the former CBC Country Canada channel (which was a joint venture with Corus Entertainment), Blue Ant would later purchase the remaining shares in Quarto Communication and rename the company Cottage Life Media. Bold would subsequently relaunch as Cottage Life on September 4, 2013.
