= Rock Entertainment =

Southeast Asian pay TV channel

ROCK Entertainment
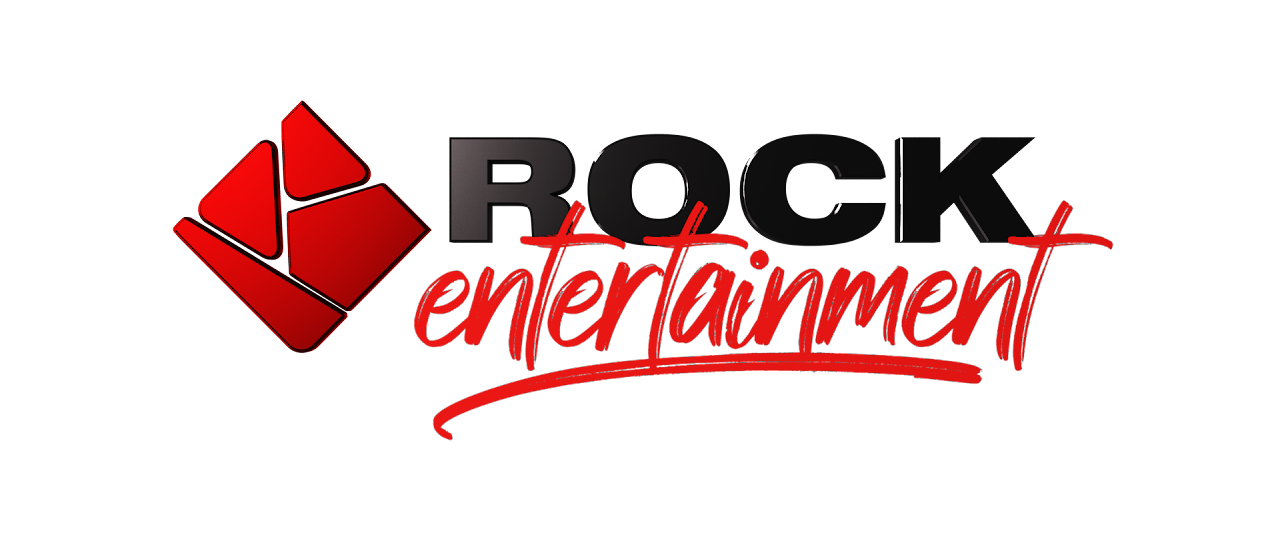
- Broadcast area: Hong Kong; Indonesia; Malaysia; Philippines; Cambodia; Singapore; Taiwan; Thailand; Mongolia; Sri Lanka; Maldives; Palau; Myanmar; South Korea
- Affiliates: NBCUniversal International Networks (for Universal Diva block)
- Headquarters: Singapore

Programming
- Language: English
- Picture format: 1080i HDTV

Ownership
- Owner: Rock Entertainment Holdings
- Sister channels: Rock Extreme (Taiwan only); Rock Action; Rock X Stream

History
- Launched: 1 September 2013; 13 years ago
- Closed: 1 April 2023; 3 years ago (Vietnam)
- Former names: RTL CBS Entertainment HD (2013–2016); RTL CBS Entertainment (2017-2018); Blue Ant Entertainment (2018–2021)

Availability

Terrestrial
- Cignal TV (Philippines): Channel 120
- SatLite (Philippines): Channel 94
- StarHub TV (Singapore): Channel 509
- Singtel TV (Singapore): Channel 318

Streaming media
- Cignal Play (Philippines): Internet Protocol television (requires premium subscription)
- Vidio (Indonesia): OTT streaming (requires premium subscription)
- Unifi TV (Malaysia): Ch 473

Rock Entertainment Holdings, Pte. Ltd.
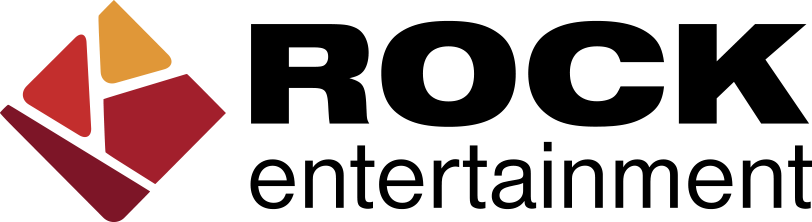
- Formerly: RTL CBS Asia Entertainment Network (2013–2016); Blue Ant Media Asia (2017–2022)
- Type: Private
- Industry: Mass media
- Founded: 1 September 2013; 13 years ago
- Headquarters: Singapore
- Area served: Southeast Asia
- Key people: Ward Platt
- Products: Television production Television channels
- Brands: Rock Entertainment; Rock Extreme (Taiwan only); Rock Action; Rock X Stream; ZooMoo; Love Nature; Smithsonian Channel; Makeful; Global Trekker; Outdoor Channel; Golden Chinese Drama (Hong Kong only)
- Website: www.rockentertainment.com

Rock Entertainment (formerly RTL CBS Entertainment and Blue Ant Entertainment; stylized as ROCK entertainment) is a 24/7 Southeast Asian English-language television channel owned by Rock Entertainment Holdings.

== History ==
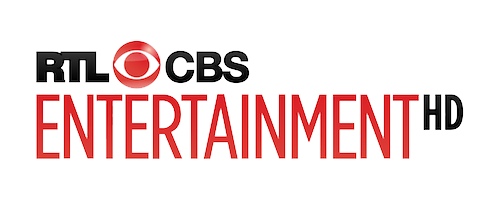
RTL CBS Entertainment HD

Launched in 2013, it was initially called RTL CBS Asia Entertainment Network, a joint-venture of RTL Group and CBS Studios International. This channel launched on 1 September 2013, which focuses on entertainment and variety shows and broadcast in high-definition. Within 2 years, the channel became available in 2015 to Philippine cable viewers with a separate feed.

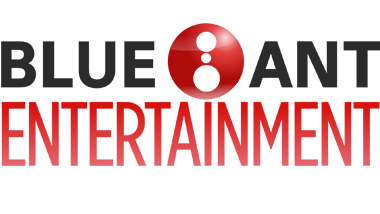
Blue Ant Entertainment

On 1 January 2018, the channel changed its name to Blue Ant Entertainment after Blue Ant Media's acquisition of the said channel, along with Blue Ant Extreme.

In 2020, Blue Ant Media sold most of its linear television operations in Asia to Rock Entertainment Holdings, a company owned by Blue Ant executive Ward Platt. On 1 September 2021, the channel was rebranded as Rock Entertainment to reflect the new ownership.

On 12 December 2022, Rock Entertainment Holdings restructured their contents, with the plan to focus on movies and special events, which also led to the launch of the sister channel Rock Action as the replacement for Rock Extreme.

In January 2026, Rock Entertainment launched its newest daily reality programming block thru the Universal Diva banner under content outsourcing agreement with NBCUniversal International Networks.

== Operating channels ==
- Rock Entertainment (HDTV, Asia except Philippines)
- Rock Entertainment (Philippines) – Joint-venture with Asian Cable Communications

== See also ==
- Rock Extreme
