= Rock Action (TV channel) =

ROCK Action
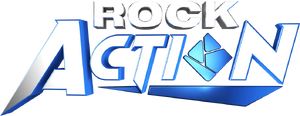
- Broadcast area: Hong Kong; Indonesia; India; Malaysia; Philippines; Singapore; Taiwan; Thailand; Cambodia; Sri Lanka; Maldives; Mongolia; South Korea; Africa
- Headquarters: Singapore

Programming
- Language: English
- Picture format: 1080i HDTV

Ownership
- Owner: Rock Entertainment Holdings
- Sister channels: Rock Entertainment; Rock Extreme (Taiwan only); Rock X Stream

History
- Launched: 27 March 2014; 12 years ago
- Former names: RTL CBS Extreme (2014–2017); Blue Ant Extreme (2018–2021); Rock Extreme (2021–2022)

Availability

Terrestrial
- SatLite (Philippines): Channel 78
- Ddish TV (Mongolia): Channel 403
- G Sat (Philippines): Channel 79
- MNC Vision (Indonesia): Channel 248
- Cignal TV (Philippines): Channel 57
- K Vision (Indonesia): Channel 14; Channel 88
- TrueVisions (Thailand): Channel 147; Channel 229; Channel 338
- Singtel TV (Singapore): Channel 310
- AIS Play (Thailand): Channel 109

Rock Action (visually rendered in all uppercase) is a Southeast Asian English-language movie channel serving Southeast Asia, owned by Rock Entertainment Holdings.

Since its launched in 2014, it was originally known as RTL CBS Extreme, created by RTL CBS Asia Entertainment Network, a joint-venture of RTL Group and CBS Studios International which focuses on action-packed movies and broadcast in high-definition.

On January 1, 2018, RTL CBS Extreme was renamed Blue Ant Extreme after Blue Ant Media's acquisition of RTL CBS.

On August 18, 2021, Blue Ant Media Asia rebranded their corporate name as Rock Entertainment Holdings, thus they rebranded their channels as Rock Entertainment and Rock Extreme respectively.

On December 12, 2022, Rock Entertainment Holdings restructured their contents, with the plan to focus on movies and special events, which Rock Extreme was rebranded as Rock Action, which focuses on action movies, on selected regions and TV providers. Also, Rock Extreme continue on-air, with Rock Action logo in bottom left with text "Sneak Peek".

Rock Action mainly carries films from Hollywood film studios Sony Pictures, Paramount Pictures, Reel One Entertainment, MarVista Entertainment, Universal Pictures, and Lionsgate Films, among others.

== See also ==
- Rock Entertainment
