= Cottage Life (TV channel) =

Canadian television channel

- Country: Canada
- Broadcast area: National; Worldwide
- Headquarters: Toronto, Ontario

Programming
- Picture format: 480i (SDTV); 1080i (HDTV)

Ownership
- Owner: Corus Entertainment (2001–2002); Canadian Broadcasting Corporation (2001–2012); Blue Ant Media (2012–present)
- Sister channels: BBC Earth; BBC First; Love Nature; Makeful; Smithsonian Channel; T+E

History
- Launched: September 4, 2001, 23 years ago
- Former names: Country Canada (2001-2002); CBC Country Canada (2002–2008); Bold (2008-2013)

Links
- Website: Cottage Life

Availability

Streaming media
- RiverTV: Over-the-top TV

Cottage Life is a Canadian English language discretionary specialty channel owned by Blue Ant Media. Operated as a brand extension spin-off of the magazine of the same name, the network originally aired a variety of programming focusing on the cottage and rural lifestyle genre within the core themes of DIY and design, food and entertaining, real estate, and outdoor living. It now primarily airs a limited slate of reality and engineering-focused programming.

The network originally launched in 2001 as Country Canada, which primarily focused on programming of interest to rural Canadians, including news and lifestyle programming. After the Canadian Broadcasting Corporation bought out Corus Entertainment's stake in Country Canada, the network began to transition towards marketing itself as a companion to CBC Television, reduced the amount of rural-themed programming it aired in favour of entertainment programs and CBC Sports overflow, and eventually re-branded itself as Bold in 2008. In the midst of budget cuts at the CBC, Bold was sold to its current owners, Blue Ant Media, in April 2012; on September 4, 2013, Bold was re-launched by Blue Ant Media as Cottage Life.

== History ==
Channel logo under the name Country Canada (2001-2002)

In November 2000, a joint venture between Corus Entertainment (70%) and the CBC (30%) was granted a television broadcasting licence by the Canadian Radio-television and Telecommunications Commission (CRTC) to launch a channel called Land and Sea, presumably the name taken from the CBC original series Land and Sea. The newly licensed channel was described as "a national English-language Category 1 specialty television service for rural Canadian families, with a focus on adults 25-54. The service will provide information, interaction and entertainment from a rural perspective."

The channel was launched on September 4, 2001 as Country Canada; based on the CBC Television series Country Canada. The channel held true to its CRTC-mandated nature of service by focusing on rural news, information, lifestyle, and entertainment programming suitable for the whole family. Such programs that were broadcast on the channel included CountryLine, a call-in talk show discussing various topics of interest to rural Canadians; CBC News: CountryWide, a national news program with both a morning and evening edition focusing on national news stories; Northern Exposure; All Creatures Great and Small; and the television rendition of Harrowsmith Country Life.

Logo used as CBC Country Canada (2002-2008)

In July 2002, the CBC announced it would purchase Corus' interest in the service, which was approved by the CRTC on October 24 of that year. The CBC took control of the service on November 1, 2002 and rebranded the service with a new logo and name, CBC Country Canada.

Logo used under the name Bold (2008-2013)

After the change in ownership, the CBC initially relied heavily on CBC Television programming to fill the channel's schedule, with a particular focus on news programs. This transition was the first step in the channel moving away from its mandate to focus solely on rural programming, instead, shifting towards a focus on general interest Canadian programming. New programming added to the schedule included all 14 30-minute regional editions of Canada Now, Venture, CBC News: Politics, amateur sports programming from CBC Sports, CBC News: Saturday Report, and Cross Country Checkup.

After the initial change in programming after the rebranding, news, although still present on the channel, became less significant as the channel began to air more lifestyle, entertainment, and documentary programming such as Food Chain, an original program discussing various aspects of food; Greatdocs.ca, a series of various Canadian-made documentaries; Johnny Canuck Cinema, a series of various Canadian films; An American in Canada; and London's Burning.

Eventually, beginning in 2005, with the change in programming to focus more on general Canadian programming rather than solely rural-programming, the channel began to continuously promoted itself and its programs as a channel, according to its website, dedicated to "celebrating Canada, its land, people, regions and passions". This shift included an increase in dramatic television series from Canada and Britain that had little to no relation to the rural lifestyle, and an increase in amateur sports coverage including alpine skiing, curling, snowboarding, Toronto FC, and Canada national team soccer, among others. In further continuation with this shift, in early 2007, CBC Country Canada began to no longer promote itself as a rural lifestyle service, rather as a secondary general entertainment service to the CBC, touting, according to its website "the new home of exclusive dramas and world championship sports, from home and around the world. From provocative documentaries to a new series of investigative thrillers, CBC Country Canada has something for everyone." Programs at this point in time included such series as Vincent, Sensitive Skin, Monkey Dust, This Is Wonderland, and 72 Hours: True Crime.

On March 27, 2008 at 12:01 a.m. EST, CBC Country Canada was rebranded as Bold to better reflect the programming direction CBC Country Canada was moving in, and to focus its programming on drama, comedy, the arts, and sports rather than an informational and lifestyle service for rural Canadians.

In time for its companion coverage of the 2010 FIFA World Cup, a high-definition feed launched on June 3, 2010.

=== Nature of service dispute ===
Prior to rebranding the service as Bold, the CBC informed the CRTC in October 2007 of its intentions and new programming directive for the service. Following this correspondence, the CBC and the CRTC exchanged correspondence back and forth in an effort to clarify how the change in programming for Bold met the nature of service Bold was intended to meet when it was originally licensed in 2000. The CRTC ultimately was not satisfied with the CBC's argument and called a public hearing into the matter in June 2009.

Prior to the hearing, the CBC contacted the CRTC to inform them that they did not contest the CRTC's view that the service did not meet the requirements of its nature of service and informed the CRTC that it would like to file an application to modify Bold's nature of service to state it is "a national English-language Category 1 specialty television service for rural Canadians. The service will provide information, interaction and entertainment."

During the separate hearing for the application to modify Bold's nature of service at a later date, the CRTC examined the request and found several issues with the change in nature of service, primarily being that it would allow the service to morph into a general interest service instead of a niche service for rural Canadians, since it would not require the channel to be from "a rural perspective", implying a service defined as "for rural Canadians" would be too broad in nature. Subsequently, the CRTC denied its application and required the CBC to inform the CRTC within 30 days of a new programming proposal to ensure its meets the channel's nature of service.

In response to this decision, the CBC filed yet another application to amend Bold's nature of service, this time reading as "a national English-language Category A specialty television service with a focus on adults 25-54. The service will provide information, interaction and entertainment programming dedicated to reflecting Canada's various regions, including Canada's rural and non-urban regions, to national and regional audiences. The mandate of the service will be to reflect in its programming the unique tapestry of Canada's regions, including programming that reflects the living realities of rural Canadians." Within this application, the CBC also requested to define rural Canadians using Statistics Canada definition, reading as "individuals from rural non-metro adjacent areas, rural metro adjacent areas and rural northern areas."

Although the CRTC raised some concerns over the proposed schedule the CBC submitted as part of this application, the CRTC ultimately approved the application and was satisfied with the changes, stating that the new definition of rural Canadians was more appropriate since it reflected their geographical location, rather than their occupations as the previous nature of service defined; and to ensure the programming reflected Canada's various regions, as per the new nature of service, the CRTC added a definition of such programming.

=== Blue Ant Media purchase ===
On April 4, 2012, the CBC announced, in the wake of a $115 million government funding budget cut to be phased in over the next 3 years, that it would sell Bold as a measure to cope with the budget shortfall since the service's licence conditions no longer fit the CBC's strategy nor complement the other programming streams. On August 17, 2012, Blue Ant Media announced that it would purchase the channel for an undisclosed amount, later revealed at $10 million. As a federal crown corporation asset owned by the CBC, the deal also required approval from the Governor-in-Council, which was approved in February 2013. On November 17, 2012, the CRTC approved the sale of Bold to Blue Ant Media. As a condition of the acquisition, Blue Ant stated that it would fund the production of programming that reflects Canada's rural and non-urban regions.

==== Rebranding as Cottage Life ====
In July 2011, Blue Ant Media purchased a 15% interest in Quarto Communications, with its intentions of launching several television channels based upon Quarto's magazine brands, in particular, Cottage Life. Later, in November 2011, Quarto was granted a license for a Category B service known as Cottage Life Television, which would be focused on programming dealing with cottage communities and lifestyles. Four months after it announced its intentions to purchase Bold, Blue Ant would later purchase the remaining shares in Quarto Communication and rename the company Cottage Life Media.

In April 2013, Blue Ant announced it would launch Cottage Life in the fall of 2013; it was speculated that the company would re-launch Bold as a Cottage Life channel, primarily because the rural-based nature of service complimented the subject matter that Cottage Life covered and Bold had existing carriage deals on the majority of all digital television service providers in Canada due to its Category A status. However, Blue Ant did not confirm any rumours or its intentions for the channel.

Although still with no public announcement of the channel's re-branding from Blue Ant Media, it was indirectly confirmed through various television service providers (i.e., announcements on the respective TV provider's websites, statements confirming Cottage Life's television placement on the dial would be that of Bold's, etc.) that Bold would be re-branded as Cottage Life on September 4, 2013. It was confirmed on August 22, 2013 by Blue Ant Media that Bold would be rebranded on September 4 via a press release.

== See also ==
- List of Canadian television channels
- Channel drift
