= Makeful =

Canadian pay television channel

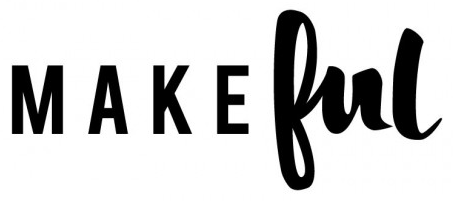
- Country: Canada
- Broadcast area: Canada
- Headquarters: Toronto, Ontario

Programming
- Language: English
- Picture format: 480i (SDTV) (2005-present) 1080i (HDTV) (2014-present)

Ownership
- Owner: Blue Ant Media
- Sister channels: BBC Earth; BBC First; Cottage Life; Love Nature; Smithsonian Channel; T+E

History
- Launched: March 5, 2005; 21 years ago
- Former names: BiteTV (2005–2015)

Links
- Website: tv.bemakeful.com

Availability

Streaming media
- RiverTV: Over-the-top TV

Makeful is a Canadian specialty television channel owned by Blue Ant Media focused on lifestyle programming relating to do-it-yourself projects such as food, design, style, and crafts in connection with maker culture (from which the channel takes its name).

The channel was first launched on March 5, 2005, as BiteTV. Originally airing short-form reality programming, the channel eventually shifted its focus towards comedy programming. By 2013, Bite began airing general entertainment programming before ultimately relaunching under its current name on August 24, 2015.

Makeful was available in 8.5 million households, as of 2013. Outside of Canada, the Makeful brand is operated by Rock Entertainment Holdings in Southeast Asia.

== History ==
=== As BiteTV ===
In December 2001, Glassbox Television was given approval by the Canadian Radio-television and Telecommunications Commission (CRTC) to launch a Category 2 digital specialty channel tentatively called Short TV, a channel described as "devoted entirely to short form films shot on film, video or created with computer animation. Short TV will showcase Canadian and international cutting edge short form films, from 1 to 40 minutes in length." The channel was originally going to launch in April 2005, but instead launched on March 15, 2005, as BiteTV. The channel used the slogan "TV with bite". At launch, Glassbox Television held 100% of the channel.

In May 2006, BiteTV won the Pixel award from the 2006 Canadian New Media Award in the category of Excellence in Cross-Platform. In April 2007, BiteTV won an International Emmy in the category of "Interactive Channel".

In June 2010, the CRTC gave Glassbox Television approval for an amendment to its nature of service, allowing it to de-emphasize its focus on short-form programming; with the amendment, BiteTV's programming would instead of consisting entirely of short-form programming, must "predominantly" feature such programming. The CRTC also granted BiteTV the ability to add sitcoms and feature films, among other programs.

BiteTV logo used from 2010 to 2013.

In response to the CRTC decision, on October 22, 2010, BiteTV underwent a format and logo change, focusing entirely on comedy programming, incorporating sitcoms and feature films to its schedule, including additional sketch comedy and stand-up programs.

On February 13, 2013, another brand refresh for Bite was unveiled, with a new logo and graphics.

In 2013, Bite teamed up with Mondo Media and YouTube to create Bite on Mondo, a program in which content creators pitched ideas for new shows. The pitches are funded through Mondo and use YouTube's popularity to decide whether or not they will be picked up. The winning pitches were broadcast on Bite on August 29, 2014. In October 2014, parent company Blue Ant Media, Mondo Media, and Corus Entertainment announced that Teletoon would air a new series featuring shorts from the program. It was expected to premiere in 2016 on Teletoon at Night, but instead premiered on September 4, 2015, as Night Sweats on Adult Swim.

The HD feed was launched in 2014. At the time, it was only available to Bell Aliant subscribers.

Last Bite logo, 2013 to 2015.

==== On-screen and interactive features ====
Before rebranding as a comedy channel, BiteTV maintained a multi-panel visual format that differed from most other television channels, with content surrounding programs being broadcast on the channel consisting a display of on-air promotions and upcoming shows, a BiteTV office webcam, a status bar to show the remaining time left in the show, and a feature called "The Crawl" that contained pointless facts, weird laws, updates on programming, and the PC Chat 2 Screen function. By 2009, they would ditch the multi-panel layout that they used, only keeping the status bar.

The PC Chat 2 Screen was a function created by BiteTV that let viewers interact with the channel and other viewers by letting them comment on what would appear on-air within minutes. As with early user-generated content meant for television (mainly seen then on MTV and Tech TV), it was subject early on to contributions from viewers containing either inappropriate content or spam links which were not vetted before coming to air, requiring BiteTV to institute human and automatic moderation to keep content broadcast-safe.

=== As Makeful (2015–present) ===
In June 2015, at its annual upfront, Blue Ant subsequently omitted any reference to BiteTV in announcing its fall schedule plans, while announcing a "new and improved" lifestyle network named Makeful. It was later announced on August 18, 2015, that Bite would be rebranded as Makeful on August 24, described as "a new lifestyle specialty channel celebrating the maker community and the creation of one-of-a-kind, handmade goods."

The final program to air under the BiteTV banner was SOS: Save Our Skins. The channel officially relaunched on August 24 at 5:00 a.m. Eastern time. Following the rebrand, sister channel AUX added some of the comedy programming that had aired in repeats on Bite, such as Brickleberry (later moved to The Comedy Network).

On June 22, 2018, Blue Ant Media announced the launch of its Asian feed of Makeful HD in a carriage deal with Starhub TV on August 31, 2018 due to the closure of Discovery Network channels on Starhub TV, the channel showcases the skills and creativity of local Singaporean makers. It is their first distribution into Asia Pacific, and it eventually launched in Malaysia, Philippines, Indonesia, Thailand and Hong Kong later.

== Programming ==
Makeful currently airs a mix of lifestyle, reality, and documentary programming. Original programming aired on the channel has included Landscape Artist of the Year Canada. Though primarily dedicated to maker culture-based shows, the channel also airs general entertainment programming; such as Whose Line Is It Anyway?, a Canadian version of Hoarders, and Celebrity Family Feud.

As Bite TV, the channel historically aired short form programming, and also aired various comedy shows, such as It's Always Sunny in Philadelphia, Jimmy Kimmel Live!, and Warren United. In its final years, Bite would add general audience reality shows, such as Party Down South and Cops.
