= Glassbox Television =

Glassbox Television Inc.
- Type: Subsidiary
- Industry: Media
- Founded: 2001; 25 years ago
- Founder: Jeffrey Elliott
- Defunct: 2012
- Fate: Acquired by Blue Ant Media
- Headquarters: Mississauga, Ontario, Canada
- Key people: Jeffrey Elliott, Raja Khanna, Rick Pyman, Sharon Stevens, Greg Hull
- Products: Broadcasting, Television Production

Glassbox Television Inc. was a Canadian broadcasting and digital media company specializing in interactive television, digital publishing, and cross-platform broadcasting.

Founded in 2001 by Jeffrey Elliott, the company operated specialty television channels including BiteTV, AUX, and Travel + Escape. Glassbox Television was headquartered in Mississauga, Ontario.

== Assets ==
- Aux — a music channel and website dedicated to new and emerging artists.
- BiteTV — a comedy-focused channel and website.
- Travel + Escape — channel focused on travel and adventure programming.

Glassbox also owned a production division creating television content and a digital publishing division that operates various digital properties including blogs, broadband portals, mobile sites, among others as well as representing various Canadian and international online advertising brands in Canada.

== History ==
- 2001: Company is founded by Jeffrey Elliott.
- 2003: Jeffrey Elliott signed a deal to launch BiteTV.
- March 5, 2005: The company was made into a TV company and BiteTV launches.
- 2006: BiteTV wins a Pixel Award.
- 2007: BiteTV wins an International Emmy.
- 2009: Aux TV launches.
- October 22, 2010: BiteTV undergoes a format logo and change.
- November 2010: Acquisition of Travel+Escape from CTVglobemedia
- July 5, 2013: The company is acquired by Blue Ant Media and its 3 channels are now part of Blue Ant Media.

=== Closure ===
On April 11, 2011, it was announced that Blue Ant Media, an upstart media company headed by former Alliance Atlantis executive Michael MacMillan, would acquire Glassbox Television. Blue Ant Media would require Canadian Radio-television and Telecommunications Commission (CRTC) approval, which was approved on September 14, 2011. The company would later be purchased outright by Blue Ant Media in the summer of 2012. As of 2013, the company no longer exists, its 3 channels are now part of Blue Ant Media.
