= T+E =

- Country: Canada
- Broadcast area: Canada
- Headquarters: Toronto, Ontario

Programming
- Picture format: 1080i HDTV (downscaled to letterboxed 480i for the SDTV feed)

Ownership
- Owner: Blue Ant Media
- Sister channels: BBC Earth; BBC First; Cottage Life; Love Nature; Makeful; Smithsonian Channel

History
- Launched: September 7, 2001; 24 years ago
- Former names: CTV Travel (2001–2006); Travel + Escape (2006–2018)

Links
- Website: T+E

Availability

Streaming media
- RiverTV: Over-the-top TV

T+E is a Canadian English language cable television specialty channel. Owned by Blue Ant Media, the channel primarily broadcasts paranormal and true crime programming.

This channel was originally established in 2001 as CTV Travel by its original owner Bell Globemedia as an offshoot of CTV Television Network with its programming devoted to travel and adventure. After a number of numerous ownership changes throughout the years, the channel was renamed to its current name in 2018 and adopted its current format.

== History ==
=== Under CTV (2000–2010) ===
On November 24, 2000, a general partnership consisting of BCE Media Inc./Groupe TVA Inc. (owning 51%) and CTV Television Inc. (owning 49%) were granted approval by the Canadian Radio-television and Telecommunications Commission (CRTC) to launch Travel TV, which would be devoted to "travel-related programming", including "adventure, outdoor, sporting, cultural and historical interests."

The channel was launched on September 7, 2001, as CTV Travel under the sole ownership of CTV Television Inc (now a wholly owned division of what is now Bell Media). Programming on the channel consisted of docu-series devoted to travel such as Jet Set, Exotic Islands, Places of Mystery, and Full Circle with Michael Palin.

On October 30, 2006, CTV Travel was renamed Travel + Escape (stylized as travel + escape until October 5, 2011) to give the channel, described by its owner, a new "edgier" look and feel to fit its new shift in programming the channel had already been making towards more personality- and experience-based travel series rather than the typical travelogue programs. New programs introduced to the channel included such series as Dead Famous, The Pleasure Zone, Hunt for Supertwister, Mayhem at the Manor, and reruns of the reality competition series The Amazing Race.

On June 8, 2010, it was announced the channel would be sold to Glassbox Television. The sale was approved by the CRTC on October 26 and closed shortly thereafter.

=== Under Blue Ant Media (2011–present) ===
On April 11, 2011, it was announced that Blue Ant Media would acquire a controlling interest in Glassbox Television. Blue Ant Media initially acquired a 29.9% stake in the company, with the option to expand their stake up to 75% which would give the company controlling interest.

On October 5, 2011, Glassbox Television announced that Travel + Escape would undergo a major overhaul on November 1, 2011. The overhaul included a new logo, on-air presentation, and a slate of new programming. On December 15, 2011, Travel + Escape launched a high definition feed.

In the Summer of 2012, Glassbox Television would be fully acquired by Blue Ant Media. Under their ownership, the channel would further shift its focus away from travel-based series to general-interest adventure and exploration based programming.,

In March 2018, Travel + Escape shortened its name to its initialism T+E (becoming a backronym for "Totally Entertaining"), finalizing its shift to a schedule based on paranormal-themed programming.

== Logos ==
2001–2006	2006–2011	2011–2019
