= 2012 in Canadian television =

The following is a list of events affecting Canadian television in 2012. Events listed include television show debuts, finales, cancellations, and channel launches, closures and rebrandings.

== Events ==
=== January ===
Date	Event
2	Saskatchewan Communications Network begins carrying entertainment programming from the national schedule of Citytv (owned by Rogers Communications); the network's programming airs under the banner "Citytv on SCN", running daily from 3 p.m.-5:59 a.m. CT. With the move, SCN becomes the second educational cable channel in Canada to offer entertainment programming from a commercial network/system (CTV Two Alberta being the other).
9	The Score Television Network signs an agreement with Fox Sports giving the channel the Canadian television rights to around 250 hours of American collegiate sporting events annually (including rights to college football, basketball and hockey games from the Big 12, Pac-12 and Conference USA) along with rights to additional programming from Fox Sports Net and Fuel TV.
12	Rogers Communications launches Sportsnews, a sports-based barker channel initially available on Rogers Cable systems in Ontario and Atlantic Canada.
13	TSN renews its broadcast rights to the Australian Open tennis tournament for ten years through 2021.
17	Rogers Media announced it would purchase Saskatchewan Communications Network from Bluepoint Investment Corporation, and rebrand the channel as "Citytv Saskatchewan" pending CRTC approval; under Rogers ownership, the channel would continue to carry educational programming from 6 a.m.-2:59 p.m. CT (as per its license as an educational service) and launch an HD simulcast feed. The Canadian Radio-television and Telecommunications Commission approved SCN's sale to Rogers Media on June 21.
24	CTV Specialty Television rebrands its French-language sports news specialty channel RIS Info Sports as RDS Info.
25	The Canadian Radio-television and Telecommunications Commission extends the mandatory basic cable distribution of Pelmorex's weather-oriented specialty channels, English-language The Weather Network and French-language MétéoMédia, to August 31, 2018 (the mandatory distribution term was originally set to run through August 31, 2015).

=== February ===
Date	Event
21	Allarco Entertainment signs a licensing and programming distribution agreement with Starz Media granting Allarco's premium service Super Channel the Canadian broadcast rights to original series produced for and select feature films licensed for broadcast by U.S. premium channel Starz.
24	Rogers Cable launches NextBox 2.0, allowing subscribers of the Ontario-based cable provider to view recorded television programs on all television sets within the home from a single PVR via a special HD terminal, along with the ability to stream over 20 channels of live television programming on tablet computers within a subscriber's home via a Wi-Fi connection.

=== March ===
Date	Event
1	Rogers Communications signs a carriage agreement with Groupe TVA and Sun Media, allowing Sun News Network, and French-language networks TVA and TVA Sports to be made available on Rogers Cable systems in Ontario, New Brunswick and Newfoundland and Labrador.
5	Quebecor Media reaches an agreement with the Canadian Broadcasting Corporation to renew its carriage agreement for five French-language specialty channels operated by Télévision de Radio-Canada (ARTV, Explora, RDI, TV5 Québec Canada and TV5Monde) on its Vidéotron cable systems across Quebec, and allowing the Radio-Canada broadcast network to purchase advertising on different platforms owned by Quebecor.
6	The CRTC approves a license amendment to allow Viewers Choice to operate as a national service; the pay-per-view television service, owned as a joint venture between Astral Media, CTV Specialty Television Inc. and Rogers Media had been restricted to serve Ontario, Quebec, and the Atlantic provinces since its 1991 launch.
16	Astral Media announced an agreement to merge its assets with Bell Media, among them its 18 specialty cable channels (including Family, The Movie Network and Teletoon) and two over-the-air television stations in British Columbia affiliated with CBC Television (CJDC/Dawson Creek and CFTK/Terrace), for $3.38 billion.
23	Dusk, a Category B specialty channel owned by Shaw Communications and Corus Entertainment, focusing on thriller, suspense and supernatural-themed programming, ends operations after eleven years (the channel originally launched as SCREAM in 2001 to its 2009 rebranding as Dusk).
26	ABC Spark, a Category B specialty channel (owned by Corus Entertainment) officially debuts, carrying programming primarily from U.S. cable channel ABC Family; the channel "soft launched" three days earlier on March 23.
28	Explora, a CBC-owned French language Category B specialty channel debuts, featuring science, environment, nature and health programming.
30	The Canadian Broadcasting Corporation announces that the Parliament of Canada will cut its annual budget by 10% (reducing it by $115 million through 2014); public interest group Friends of Canadian Broadcasting alleges the reduction in funding for the CBC contradicts an election promise by the Conservative Party to maintain or increase funding to the national public broadcaster. On April 10, the CBC announced layoffs of 256 positions across its TV and radio services, along with the closures of some overseas news bureaus, and reductions in original programming.

=== April ===
Date	Event
20	During a telecast of CHCH/Hamilton's late-morning newscast, Cogeco and Shaw Cable's transmissions of the independent station were interrupted for around three minutes by an adult specialty channel's broadcast of a hardcore gay porn film. The error, believed to have occurred during cable line repairs, did not affect over-the-air and satellite viewers, and subscribers of other cable and satellite providers.
30	Fox Sports World Canada, a Category B specialty channel owned by Shaw Media, focusing on international sporting events, ceased operations after eleven years.
30	Sportsnet announces an agreement with UEFA Europa League securing multimedia broadcast rights to the seasonal matches and the UEFA Europa Cup soccer tournament through the 2014-15 season via the internet and mobile devices as well as television, along with expanded French-language coverage of UEFA matches across digital platforms through an agreement between Sportsnet and TVA Sports.

=== May ===
Date	Event
3	Rogers Media announces its intent to purchase multicultural station CJNT/Montreal from Channel Zero, pending CRTC approval. In tandem with the sale, CJNT began offering programming from Rogers' Citytv and Omni television systems through an affiliation agreement, on June 4, 2012 (CJNT was previously affiliated with the now-defunct CH / E! television system from 2001 to 2009).
3	Rogers Media signs a separate long-term affiliation renewal agreement with Jim Pattison Group-owned Citytv affiliates CKPG/Prince George, CFJC/Kamloops and CHAT/Medicine Hat; under the agreement, the three stations' program lineups will follow the scheduling grid of Citytv O&O CKVU/Vancouver effective September 1 and carry 90% of the system's primetime schedule and the majority of its morning and daytime lineup (not accounting breakaways for the station's midday and evening weekday newscasts).
4	Sportsnet announces the renewal of its broadcast rights to the FA Cup soccer tournament through the 2017-18 season. The six-year extension also grants multi-platform rights for the broadcasts of up to 59 matches per year via the internet and mobile devices, as well as television.
7	Shaw Media launches Category B digital specialty channel Nat Geo Wild; the Nat Geo Wild name and logo is in use through a licensing agreement with News Corporation, which also licenses programming and branding to Shaw Media's Canadian version of National Geographic Channel.
14	Teenage male dance trip Sagkeeng's Finest win the first season of Canada's Got Talent.
30	Global announces expansions to its O&O stations' local news programming offerings. CIII/Toronto will launch a half-hour noon newscast starting August 27, 2012; CKND/Winnipeg, CFSK/Saskatoon and CFRE/Regina will expand their 10 p.m. newscasts to one hour effective August 20; weekday and Sunday morning newscasts on CHAN/Vancouver, CITV/Edmonton and CICT/Calgary will also be expanded by one hour (to four hours on weekdays and three hours on Sundays) on August 27 and September 2, respectively. CKMI/Montreal and CIHF/Halifax will also debut weekday morning newscasts on January 28, 2013.

=== June ===
Date	Event
7	TSN signs a three-year distribution agreement (lasting until 2015) with NBCUniversal Television Canada for the domestic television and radio broadcast rights to the Belmont Stakes.
21	Accessible Media launches the Described Video TV Guide, the first audio-described TV listings service for the blind and visually impaired.

=== July ===
Date	Event
4	Corus Entertainment and Astral Media launch a Canadian version of Cartoon Network as a Category B digital specialty channel; the channel follows the same scheduling format as the flagship U.S. channel (owned by Time Warner subsidiary Turner Broadcasting System, with the Cartoon Network and Adult Swim branding in use through a licensing agreement with TBS/Time Warner) programming aimed at children is offered from 6 a.m.-9 p.m. ET and Adult Swim programming aimed at older teenagers and adults aged 16–34 from 9 p.m.-6 a.m. ET.
18	The Canadian Radio-Television and Telecommunications Commission makes a ruling to phase out the Local Programming Improvement Fund, which was created in 2008 to fund improvements to locally-produced programming on television stations outside of major metropolitan areas during the Great Recession and the digital television transition, by August 31, 2014. In accordance with the ruling, contributions to the fund will be gradually reduced until it is phaseout is completed, and monthly surcharges imposed by Canadian cable and satellite companies to their customers that were added to the fund will be removed from customers' bills.
18	Montreal-based Cogeco purchases Quincy, Massachusetts-based cable operator Atlantic Broadband for $1.36 billion, the purchase would expand the presence of Cogeco (which already operates cable systems in several Eastern Canada provinces, primarily Ontario and Quebec) into the United States.
23	The Canadian Radio-Television and Telecommunications Commission approves Shaw Media's licence application for a British Columbia-centered 24-hour regional news channel operated by CHAN/Vancouver. The channel (tentatively named Global News: BC 1) is projected for an early 2013 launch. Shaw announced the launch of the channel on January 11.
25	Asian Television Network rebrands ATN Zee Cinema as a Canadian version of Bollywood-focused movie channel Movies OK under the name ATN Movies OK, through a brand licensing agreement with News Corporation-owned Indian television service STAR.
31	The Canadian Broadcasting Corporation shuts down 620 analog transmitters across Canada that carry programming from its English-language network CBC Television and French-language network Télévision de Radio-Canada. The Canadian Radio-Television and Telecommunications commission granted the CBC's request to revoke the licences for the analog transmitters on July 17.
31	Government-operated provincial educational broadcaster TVOntario begins the initial phase of the shutdown of its network of 114 analog transmitters across Ontario, with medium and full-powered transmitters ceasing operations in 14 markets.

=== August ===
Date	Event
1	The International Olympic Committee awards CBC Television and Télévision de Radio-Canada the Canadian broadcast rights for the 2014 Winter Olympics and the 2016 Summer Olympics.
1	Blue Ant Media completes its acquisition of High Fidelity HDTV (owners of high definition-only Category B specialty channels Oasis HD, eqhd, radX and HIFI). Blue Ant announced its intention to acquire High Fidelity TV in December 2011.
7	The Canadian Radio-Television and Telecommunications Commission approves a proposal by BCE, Inc. to establish a Broadcasting Accessibility Fund, an independent fund designed to support technological initiatives that would improve access to Canadian television and radio for people with disabilities.
12	History Television rebranded as a domestic version of History, through a licensing agreement with A+E Networks, owners of the U.S. cable channel of the same name.
18	Blue Ant Media announces an agreement with the Canadian Broadcasting Corporation to purchase of Category A digital specialty channel Bold.
23	Bell Media and Rogers Media finalize the joint acquisition of a controlling ownership stake in Maple Leaf Sports and Entertainment (which owns Leafs TV, GolTV and NBA TV Canada). The $1.07 billion purchase, which was announced on December 9, 2011 and received CRTC approval on August 16, will have both companies acquire individual stakes in the company totaling 65.5%. Kilmer Sports and BCE Master Trust Fund will each retain the remaining stakes.
25	Rogers Media enters into an agreement to acquire the assets of Score Media (owners of The Score Television Network). In addition to full ownership of The Score network, the acquisition by Rogers also includes a 10% equity interest in Score Media's digital media assets (comprising the network's website and mobile applications, whose ownership will be spun out to Score Media's existing shareholders) as well as ownership of The Score Fighting Series and closed captioning service Voice to Visual, Inc.
27	Through brand licensing agreements with A+E Networks, Shaw Media rebrands two Category B digital specialty channels as Canadian versions of A+E-owned U.S. cable channels: female-targeted Showcase Diva is rebranded as Lifetime, while The Cave relaunches as H2.
30	Rogers Media-owned Sportsnet announces the purchase of the Capital One Grand Slam of Curling (an arm of the World Curling Tour) from Insight Sports Ltd., as part of the development of a new events division.

=== September ===
Date	Event
1	Rules regarding the volume of television commercials passed by the Canadian Radio-Television and Telecommunications Commission go into effect. The rules require Canadian broadcasters and programming distributors to control the loudness of commercials during breaks within television programs through new international standards for measuring and controlling television signals, though it applies only to digital television services (the rules are similar to legislation passed in the United States by the Federal Communications Commission, which will adopt the same international standard by the end of 2012).
4	Through a brand licensing agreement with Sony Pictures Television Networks, Hollywood Suite rebrands two of its four commercial-free movie channels: Hollywood Storm is rebranded as AXN Movies and Hollywood Festival is rebranded as a Canadian version of Sony Movie Channel.
18	Mpix and its multiplex channel MorePix undergo rebranding and name changes to align the two movie channels closely with parent premium service The Movie Network: Mpix is rebranded as The Movie Network Encore, while MorePix becomes The Movie Network Encore 2. TMN Encore 2 and The Movie Network's MFest multiplex channel also launch high-definition simulcast channels, resulting in all of TMN's channels broadcasting their programming in the format.

=== October ===
Date	Event
5	CBC/Radio-Canada President and CEO Hubert T. Lacroix is reappointed to a second term.
18	The Canadian Radio-Television and Telecommunications Commission denies approval of the proposed $3.4 billion merger between Bell Media and Astral Media that was first announced on March 23, due to concerns that the combined conglomerate would potentially undermine competition in the media marketplace.
29	TSN and Sportsnet each secure Canadian broadcast rights to the Barclays Premier League. The deal with Sportsnet is an extension to a long-standing agreement with the association football league, while TSN's deal is a new agreement to take effect starting with the 2013–14 season in which the league's games will be shared between TSN, RDS and Sportsnet through the 2015–16 season.

=== November ===
Date	Event
1	Sportsnet strikes a 10-year multiplatform agreement for exclusive national broadcast rights to the British Columbia, Alberta, Manitoba and Ontario Provincial Curling Championships, in which the men's and women's championship events will be available on Sportsnet's linear cable channel, online and through mobile platforms through 2023.

=== December ===
Date	Event
1	Channel Zero launched Rewind, a Category B specialty channel which features films from the 1970s and 1980s with a target audience aimed at adults 35 and older. Rewind replaced the Movieola short film channel on most cable and satellite providers, with Movieola is now existing only as a mobile application domestically and as an online-only channel on the Hulu streaming service in the United States thereafter.
31	Citytv has rebranded to simply City. This change has occurred since October 2012 as a "soft rebrand" when the City stations (CHMI-DT in this case) began to phase in a modified branding, with a new logo consisting of just the name "City", and some promotions using the verbal branding "City Television" instead of Citytv. The change marks the first major alteration to the Citytv brand since its introduction in 1972. The new City branding was launched during its New Year's Eve special.

== Television programs ==
=== Programs debuting in 2012 ===
Series currently listed here have been announced by their respective networks as scheduled to premiere in 2012. Note that shows may be delayed or cancelled by the network between now and their scheduled air dates.

Start date	Show	Channel	Source
January 5	Detentionaire	Teletoon	
January 5	Mudpit	Teletoon	
January 5	Total Drama: Revenge of the Island	Teletoon	
January 5	My Babysitter's a Vampire (re-premiere)	Teletoon	
January 5	Leave It to Bryan	HGTV	
January 9	Mr. D	CBC Television	
January 9	Redemption Inc.	CBC Television	
January 10	Arctic Air	CBC Television	
January 10	The L.A. Complex	MuchMusic; CTV	
January 19	Les Bleus de Ramville	TFO	
January 30	Canada's Greatest Know-It-All	Discovery Channel	
February 2	Undercover Boss Canada	W Network	
March 4	Canada's Got Talent	Citytv	
March 15	Vertige	Séries+	
March 19	The Water Brothers	TVOntario	
April 9	Good God	HBO Canada	
April 12	Bake with Anna Olson	Food Network	
April 16	Buy Herself	HGTV	
May 2	I Hate Hollywood	CHCH-DT / syndication	
May 27	Continuum	Showcase	
June 7	Saving Hope	CTV	
September 7	Fugget About It	Teletoon at Night	
September 16	Over the Rainbow	CBC Television	
October 3	The Bachelor Canada	Citytv	
December 3	Tiny Plastic Men	Super Channel	

=== Programs ending in 2012 ===
End date	Show	Network	First Aired	Status	Source
April 1	Little Mosque on the Prairie	CBC Television	2007	Ended	
April 5	Jimmy Two-Shoes	Teletoon	2009	Canceled	
April 12	Total Drama: Revenge of the Island	Teletoon	2012	Canceled	
April 19	Redemption Inc.	CBC Television	2012	Canceled	
April 19	Michael: Tuesdays and Thursdays	CBC Television	2011	Canceled	
April 19	InSecurity	CBC Television	2011	Canceled	
April 19	The Debaters	CBC Television	2011	Canceled	
April 19	Cover Me Canada	CBC Television	2011	Canceled	
August 25	League of Super Evil	YTV	2009	Canceled	
December 6	My Babysitter's a Vampire	Teletoon	2011	Canceled	
December 13	Flashpoint	CTV	2008	Ended	

=== Programs changing networks ===
The following shows will air new episodes on a different network than previous first-run episodes:

Show	Moved From	Moved To	Source
Anna & Kristina's Grocery Bag	W Network	OWN (Canada)	
Dussault Inc.	Citytv	The Biography Channel	
Murdoch Mysteries	Citytv	CBC Television	

=== Made-for-TV movies and miniseries ===
Premiere date	Title	Channel	Source
March 9	Radio Rebel	YTV	
March 21	Titanic	Global	
April 3	I, Martin Short, Goes Home	CBC Television	
September 3	Titanic: Blood and Steel	CBC Television	
November 8	The Real Inglorious Bastards	History	
December 16	The Horses of McBride	CTV	

== Networks and services ==
=== Network launches ===
Network	Type	Launch date	Notes
FX Canada	Cable and satellite	October 1	

=== Network conversions and rebrandings ===
Old network name	New network name	Type	Conversion date	Notes
Dusk	ABC Spark		March 23	
The Cave	H2		August 27	
Showcase Diva	Lifetime		August 27	

== Deaths ==
Date	Name	Age	Notability	Source
Feb. 21	Pierre Juneau	89	CBC President, spearheaded the creation of CBC News Network; established Canadian content policies for television, radio as CRTC head.	
April 27	Ari Magder	28	Canadian-born child actor known for Dan Jones in Shining Time Station	
May 12	Neil McKenty	87	Talk show host	
Aug. 23	Jerry Nelson	78	Lead puppeteer for Canadian children's series Fraggle Rock and various Canadian produced specials, as well as various character on American series Sesame Street.	

== See also ==
- 2012 in Canada
- List of Canadian films of 2012
