= Silver Screen Classics =

- Silver Screen Classics logo
- Country: Canada
- Broadcast area: National
- Headquarters: Toronto, Ontario, Canada

Programming
- Picture format: 480i (SDTV); 1080i (HDTV)

Ownership
- Owner: Channel Zero (1490525 Ontario Inc.)
- Sister channels: CHCH-DT; Rewind; Halla Bol! Kids TV

History
- Launched: September 2, 2003; 22 years ago

Links
- Website: www.silverscreenclassics.com

Availability

Streaming media
- RiverTV: Over-the-top TV

Silver Screen Classics is a Canadian English language discretionary service (formerly Category B) specialty channel owned by Channel Zero Inc. The channel is the only Canadian television channel dedicated exclusively to classic films, broadcasting movies primarily from Hollywood's Golden Age, spanning the 1930s to the 1960s. Its programming includes feature films, silent films, serials, and short subjects.

The channel uses the tagline "The Faces You Remember in the Films You Can't Forget!" and features performances by classic Hollywood stars including John Wayne, Elizabeth Taylor, Humphrey Bogart, Fred Astaire, Marilyn Monroe, Ginger Rogers, Charlie Chaplin, Sophia Loren, Kirk Douglas, Spencer Tracy, Marlon Brando, Carole Lombard, and Barbara Stanwyck, as well as films by directors such as Alfred Hitchcock, Fritz Lang, Michael Curtiz, John Ford, and John Sturges.

== History ==
=== Founding and launch ===
In September 2003, the Canadian Radio-television and Telecommunications Commission (CRTC) granted Channel Zero Inc., which already operated the short film channel Movieola, a licence to operate a new cable specialty channel called Silver Screen Classics. According to its approved nature of service, the channel's schedule would include "Golden Oldies feature films and B Movies spanning all genres".

The channel launched on September 2, 2003, with Northwestel in Yellowknife, Northwest Territories, becoming the first cable company to carry the service. Bell ExpressVu began offering the channel to satellite customers two days later on September 4, 2003.

=== Regulatory history ===
In August 2014, the CRTC approved changes in ownership and effective control for the subsidiaries operating Movieola and Silver Screen Classics, including transfers among related entities. In the same decision, the CRTC renewed the licences for both channels on a short-term basis from September 1, 2014, to August 31, 2017, to permit an expedited review of adherence to Canadian programming and logging requirements, as both services had experienced compliance issues during the 2008–2013 licence term related to the minimum 35% Canadian programming requirement, program categories, and closed captioning targets.

In August 2018, the CRTC renewed the broadcasting licence for Silver Screen Classics for five years until August 31, 2023. During this renewal process, Channel Zero had proposed a 5% Canadian programming expenditure (CPE) requirement, arguing that limited Canadian programming from the 1940s–1960s era was available due to the maturity of the Canadian film industry at that time. The channel also noted that it competes with out-of-market services such as Turner Classic Movies, which have larger budgets and access to extensive content libraries. However, the CRTC ultimately set the CPE requirement at 10% of the previous year's gross revenues, consistent with standard requirements for discretionary services.

In August 2023, the CRTC renewed the channel's licence for an additional five years from September 1, 2023, to August 31, 2028.

=== High definition launch ===
The channel launched in high definition in September 2018 with its availability on IHR Telecom.

== Programming ==
Silver Screen Classics focuses exclusively on classic Hollywood cinema from the studio era, featuring films from the 1930s through the 1960s. The channel's programming mix includes feature-length films from Hollywood's Golden Age, silent films from the pre-sound era, serial films and chapter plays, and short subjects and B-movies.

The channel has also aired Condensed Classics with Dave Shaw, a hosted movie program that originally aired on sister channel Movieola before moving to Silver Screen Classics in 2004. The show, which attempted to revive the "horror host" format of the 1950s and 1960s, featured condensed versions of public domain films hosted by Dave Shaw in a black-and-white "Rat Pack" aesthetic. A revised version called "NEW Condensed Classics" began airing in 2005.

== Distribution ==
=== Cable and satellite ===
Silver Screen Classics is available through major Canadian television service providers as part of optional movie and classic television packages. The channel is carried by Bell Satellite TV (Channel 337), TELUS Optik TV (Channel 460), Shaw Direct (Channel 492), and VMedia TV.

=== Streaming ===
Silver Screen Classics is available via RiverTV, a Canadian over-the-top media service operated by VMedia that launched in June 2020. RiverTV was Canada's first virtual multichannel video programming distributor (vMVPD), offering Silver Screen Classics alongside other Channel Zero properties including CHCH-DT and Rewind.

== Corporate ==
=== Ownership ===
Silver Screen Classics is owned and operated by Channel Zero Inc., an independent Canadian media company headquartered in Toronto, Ontario. The channel is operated through the subsidiary 1490525 Ontario Inc.

Channel Zero was co-founded in 2000 by Romen Podzyhun, who serves as Chairman and CEO. The company also owns CHCH-DT, an independent over-the-air television station licensed to Hamilton, Ontario, as well as the specialty channel Rewind, which focuses on films from the 1970s, 1980s, and 1990s.

=== Related services ===
Silver Screen Classics operates alongside its sister channel Rewind, with the two services representing complementary classic film offerings: Silver Screen Classics covers pre-1970s cinema while Rewind targets Generation X audiences with films from the 1970s through 1990s.

== See also ==
- Condensed Classics with Dave Shaw
- Channel Zero (company)
- Rewind (TV channel)
- Turner Classic Movies
- Hollywood Suite
- List of Canadian television channels
