= The Red House (film) =

1947 film directed by Delmer Daves

- Theatrical release poster
- Directed by: Delmer Daves
- Screenplay by: Delmer Daves; Albert Maltz (uncredited)
- Based on: The Red House by George Agnew Chamberlain
- Produced by: Sol Lesser
- Starring: Edward G. Robinson; Lon McCallister; Judith Anderson; Rory Calhoun; Allene Roberts; Julie London; Ona Munson; Harry Shannon
- Cinematography: Bert Glennon
- Edited by: Merrill G. White
- Music by: Miklós Rózsa
- Production companies: Sol Lesser Productions; Thaila Productions
- Distributed by: United Artists
- Release dates: December 30, 1946 (Plaza Theatre); February 7, 1947
- Running time: 100 minutes
- Country: United States
- Language: English
- Budget: $1 million

The Red House is a 1947 American psychological horror film directed by Delmer Daves and starring Edward G. Robinson, Lon McCallister, Judith Anderson, Rory Calhoun, Allene Roberts, and Julie London. Its plot follows a young woman raised by a brother and sister who are concealing a secret involving an abandoned farmhouse located deep in the woods on their sprawling property. It is based on the 1945 novel of the same name by George Agnew Chamberlain, which was popularly serialized in The Saturday Evening Post. The screenplay was adapted by Daves and Albert Maltz, the latter uncredited.

Principal photography of The Red House took place in the spring of 1946, largely in Sonora, California. The film was released theatrically through United Artists, and received largely favorable reviews from film critics.

Retrospective assessment of the film has noted its genre-defying elements, surreal musical score, and provocative themes. In 2019, Paste magazine declared The Red House the best horror film released in 1947.

== Plot ==
Handicapped farmer Pete Morgan and his sister Ellen live on an isolated farm with their adopted child, Meg. They keep to themselves and are viewed as mysterious by the nearby town. Now a teenager, Meg convinces Pete to hire one of her 12th-grade high school classmates, Nath Storm, to come help with chores on the farm. On the first evening, when it is time for him to go home, Nath says he is going to take a shortcut through the old woods, a part of Pete's property he forbids anyone from entering. Pete becomes agitated, insisting the woods are dangerous and contain a haunted house which is painted red, and that Nath must stay out.

After traveling through the woods in the dark, Nath returns spooked after hearing moans and yells. However, a few days later, he is embarrassed at his cowardice and returns there after dark. He is struck from behind and knocked down into a stream. He returns to the farm believing that Pete hit him, but Meg and Ellen say Pete has been in the room with them since Nath left. Soon, both Nath and Meg become obsessed with searching for the mysterious "red house" and agree to go into the woods every Sunday, Nath's only day off, to look for it. They have no luck.

In the meantime, Meg begins to fall in love with Nath, but his jealous and manipulative girlfriend Tibby has other plans for him. Meanwhile, it is revealed that Pete has secretly given local handyman and petty thug Teller rights to hunt on the land in return for keeping trespassers off of the property.

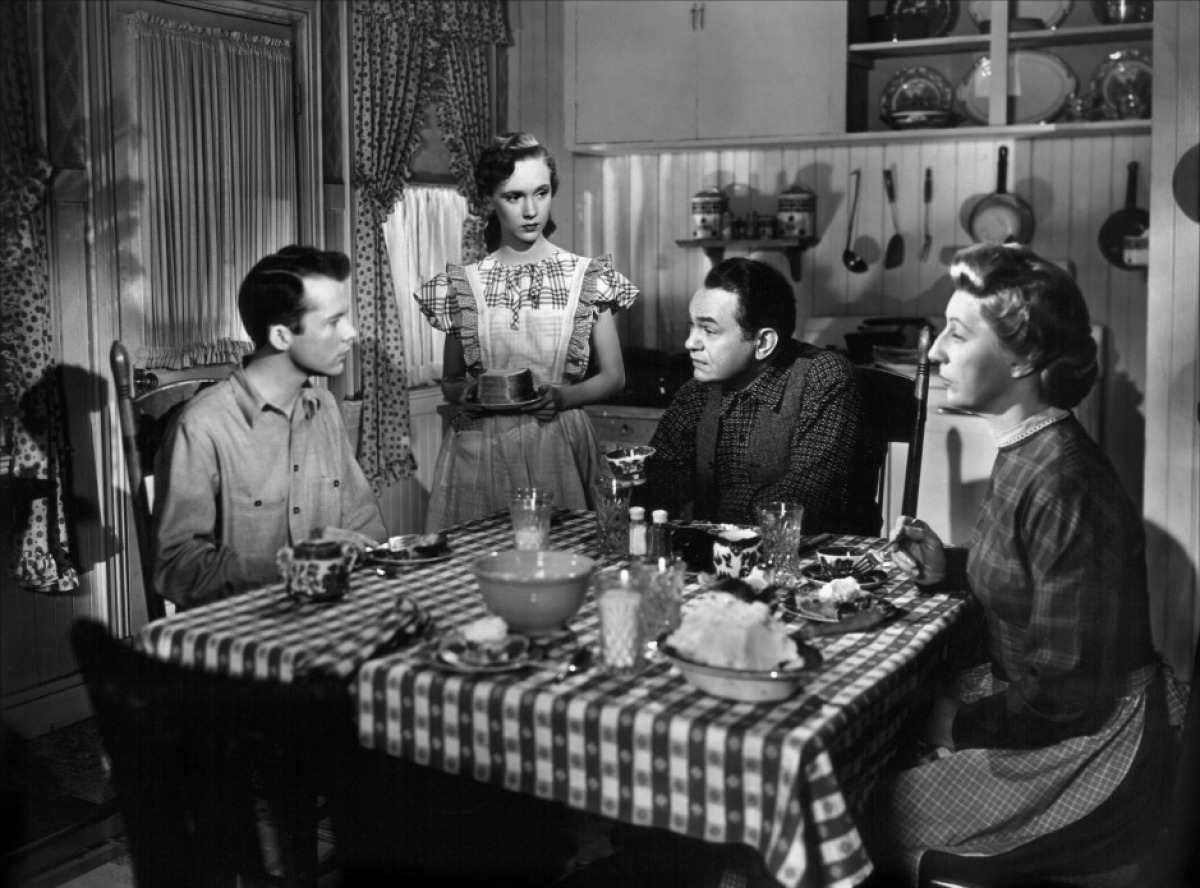
Lon McCallister, Allene Roberts, Edward G. Robinson and Judith Anderson in The Red House

One Sunday Nath cannot get out of a date with Tibby, so Meg goes off on her own to look for the red house. She finds it in a rocky ravine located a few miles from Pete's farm along an old cow path. Whilst she runs back to the farm, Teller fires several rifle shots to scare her away from returning. Meg falls down a slope and breaks her leg. That evening, when Meg does not return, Nath ventures into the woods to find her and brings her back to the farm. Pete is furious that both young people defied his warning to stay out of the woods. Later, learning that Nath climbed a tree to secretly visit Meg in her bedroom he fires Nath, banishing him from the farm and ever seeing Meg.

Nath returns to working for his mother at a local general store in town. With Nath's encouragement, his mother marries a long-time admirer and goes off for several weeks on her honeymoon, leaving Nath to mind the store. Nath soon takes additional work for the summer at Tibby's family farm close to town. As Meg recovers from her broken leg, Pete begins to crack up. He starts calling her Jeannie, and becomes controlling and domineering. Ellen and Pete have a conversation about how it was that some years ago they rented the red house to a young couple. Pete had been in love with the wife, Jeannie, since before she was married. She had not returned his love, causing him to develop an obsessive desire for her.

Nath catches the flirtatious Tibby dallying with Teller and sucker punches him. He is convinced that Teller is somehow responsible for Meg's broken leg. Nath confronts Tibby and finally learns how vain and selfish she is. Teller then punches Nath, while Tibby watches with satisfaction. Teller and Tibby then begin to kiss in front of Nath.

One evening, after she had been assaulted and injured by Pete over the red house and its hold over him, Ellen decides to burn it down. As she walks through the woods, Teller mistakes her for Nath and shoots and severely wounds her. Meg, having heard the gunshot, finds Ellen then rushes back to tell Pete, who refuses to help. Meg phones Nath and he says he will bring a stretcher after he calls the sheriff and the doctor. Pete fails to dissuade Meg from returning to the woods. By the time Nath arrives, Ellen is dead. In the meantime, Teller goes to Tibby's home and persuades her to elope with him in her father's truck. They sneak off into the country roads, but are pulled over by an alerted highway patrol. Teller makes a run for it, but stops at a warning shot and is apprehended. Tibby, who thought they were being detained to prevent the elopement, learns instead it is for murder.

Meg and Nath bring Ellen's body back. Meg demands the truth about the red house and who Jeannie is. Pete finally confesses that Ellen had been keeping the secret for him, about him being in love with a woman named Jeannie who later married another man. The married couple had a little girl, Meg. When she was two years old the couple decided to move away because of Pete's infatuation with Jeannie. Pete went to the red house to plead with her to choose between her husband and him. As they heard her husband returning, Jeannie began screaming. To stop her, Pete covered her mouth, claiming he accidentally suffocated her. He then killed her husband in cold blood. Pete buried the bodies in the basement of the ice house that sits next to the red house. Since Jeannie's husband told everyone they were leaving town, no one ever suspected they were murdered. Rather than abandon the infant, Pete and Ellen adopted little Meg. During the story, Nath slips out of the house with Pete's rifle to go after Teller.

Meg convinces Pete to help stop Nath. Pete agrees, and together they drive to the red house. Already losing his mind, Pete crumbles completely at the sight of the house and the memories it dredges up. Delusional, he thinks Meg is actually Jeannie, who is leaving him again. Re-living the experience, he puts his hand over her mouth and starts suffocating her. Nath and the sheriff show up in the nick of time. Pete takes off in his truck, intentionally crashing it into the ice house, where it plunges into the pond beneath it. As the truck sinks below its surface Pete is drowned with it.

Back at the farm a few days later, Nath and Meg watch the smoke from the red house rise, set fire by Nath to finish the job Ellen had tried to do. They talk about starting a new life together, looking forward rather than looking back.

== Cast ==
- Edward G. Robinson as Pete Morgan
- Lon McCallister as Nath Storm
- Judith Anderson as Ellen Morgan
- Rory Calhoun as Teller
- Allene Roberts as Meg Morgan
- Julie London as Tibby Rinton
- Ona Munson as Mrs. Storm
- Harry Shannon as Dr. Jonathan Byrne
- Arthur Space as The Sheriff
- Pat Flaherty as Motorcycle Cop (uncredited)
- Walter Sande as Don Brent (uncredited)

== Production ==
=== Development ===
The screenplay for The Red House was adapted by Daves and an uncredited Albert Maltz from the 1945 novel of the same name by George Agnew Chamberlain. Chamberlain's novel had been popularly serialized in The Saturday Evening Post.

=== Casting ===
Allene Roberts was seventeen years old at the time of her casting. Producer Sol Lesser acquired Julie London on loan from her contract with Universal Pictures, while Rory Calhoun was loaned from his contract with Selznick Pictures. The film marked a career breakthrough for London, who had been known primarily as a singer at the time.

=== Filming ===
The Red House was shot on location in the Sierra Nevada in and around Sonora, California. Principal photography began in April 1946, and was completed on June 28, 1946. Filming locations included the Kenny Dairy near Murphys, and the Bowlsby apple ranch in Tuolumne City. Some scenes were shot near abandoned gold mines in the historic mining community of Columbia.

== Music ==
Composer Miklós Rózsa continued his exploration of writing mysterious cues for the theremin, which was played by Samuel Hoffman. The score features stylistic similarities to Rózsa's scores for Spellbound and The Lost Weekend (both 1945), which also prominently utilized the theremin.

== Release ==
The Red House had an early screening at the Plaza Theatre in Palm Springs, California on December 30, 1946 before being released in the United States on February 7, 1947.

=== Copyright status ===
The Red House (1947) by Delmer Daves

Chamberlain's 1943 novel has no copyright registration at the Library of Congress. The five issues of The Saturday Evening Post in which the story was serialized were registered for copyright by The Curtis Publishing Co.; the copyrights of all five issues were renewed in 1973 by The Saturday Evening Post Company.

The movie was registered for copyright by Thalia Productions (LP864; 7 February 1947); that copyright was not renewed.

The film is highlighted in the first segment of Martin Scorsese's documentary A Personal Journey with Martin Scorsese Through American Movies.

An abridged version (edited down to 20 minutes) is occasionally shown on NEW Condensed Classics on the Silver Screen Classics channel in Canada.

=== Home media ===
The Red House was released in various home media formats through public domain companies due to its lapse in copyright. On April 24, 2012, it was released in a two-disc DVD and Blu-ray set, transferred from original 35mm elements and digitally restored in high definition, by Film Chest and HD Cinema Classics. Features include the theatrical 35mm trailer, a comparison of scenes before and after restoration, and an original movie art postcard. The film was released again on March 29, 2016, by The Film Detective as a standalone Blu-ray. This release contains no special features.

== Reception ==
=== Critical response ===
Writing for The New York Times, A. H. Weiler enjoyed the picture, calling it "an edifying offering, which should supply horror-hungry audiences with the chills of the month ... told intelligently and with mounting tension". As a strength of the film, Weiler cited a "uniformly good cast", including an "excellent" Robinson, a "fine" McCallister, and Anderson, who gives a "taut performance". Weiler also praised "Delmar Daves' fluid direction ... and an appropriately macabre musical assist from Miklós Rózsa."

Herbert L. Larson of The Oregonian deemed the film "grim" and "anything but light entertainment," concluding: "While the picture will not go down as one of the great films of the year it certainly will keep audiences awake."

Spencer Selby commended the film in his 1997 book Dark City: The Film Noir: "Murky psychological thriller with resonant settings and an emotive Rózsa score".

Dave Sindelar gave The Red House a positive review in 2008: "It's not perfect; it's a little too long, so you end up figuring some of the final revelations before you should, and it gets a little repetitive at times, but the strong acting and some memorable images make it worth the investment." Time Out gave the film a favorable assessment in 2012, describing it as "very Freudian, in fact, and often very frightening."

Michael Barrett, reviewing the film in 2012 for PopMatters, praised it, noting: "From some angles, The Red House is an eerie ghost story; from others, a Peyton Place; at its height, a suspenseful and despairing noir. Overall, this is a melodrama of high order. It’s heady stuff, with subtexts out of the wazoo, all handled slowly and beautifully by writer/director Delmer Daves early in a career marked by intelligence, maturity, and sexual knowledge."

Filmmaker Charles Burnett praised the film in 2012 for its frank depiction of sexuality, as well as Miklós Rózsa's musical score, concluding: "I can’t understand why it’s not shown more in film classes, why it’s not better appreciated. Delmer Daves was a very good director." On the review aggregator website Rotten Tomatoes, 83% of 6 critics' reviews are positive.

== Legacy ==
In 2019, Paste magazine declared The Red House the best horror film released in 1947. Writer and film historian Edmund Bansak favorably described the film as "one of the more avant-garde horror films of the decade," adding that it is "continually glossed over in surveys of the genre, probably because it so defies pigeon-holing as a horror film." Bansak adds that the film's pastoral setting conveys "the flavor of [rural American] folklore."

== See also ==
- List of films in the public domain in the United States

== Sources ==
- Bansak, Edmund G. (2003). Fearing the Dark: The Val Lewton Career. Jefferson, North Carolina: McFarland & Company. ISBN 978-0-7864-1709-4.
- Jancovich, Mark (2014). ""The Murderer's Mind": Edward G. Robinson, Humphrey Bogart, and the Monstrous Psychologies of 1940s Horror Film". In DeGiglio-Bellemare, Mario; Ellbé, Charlie; Woofter, Kristopher (eds.). Recovering 1940s Horror Cinema: Traces of a Lost Decade. Lanham, Maryland: Lexington Books. pp. 161–179. ISBN 978-1-498-50380-8.
- Johnson, Kevin (2007). The Dark Page: Books that Inspired American Film Noir, (1940-1949). Newcastle, Delaware: Oak Knoll Press. ISBN 978-1-584-56217-7.
- MacDonald, Laurence E. (2013). The Invisible Art of Film Music: A Comprehensive History (Second ed.). Lanham, Maryland: Scarecrow Press. ISBN 978-0-810-88398-7.
- Owen, Michael (2017). Go Slow: The Life of Julie London. Chicago, Illinois: Chicago Reviews Press. ISBN 978-1-613-73859-7.
- Selby, Spencer (1997) [1984]. Dark City: The Film Noir. Jefferson, North Carolina: McFarland. ISBN 978-0-899-50103-1.
