= RiverTV =

Canadian internet television service

- Company type: Subsidiary
- Website type: OTT platform, Entertainment
- Founded: 2020
- Headquarters: Toronto, Ontario, Canada
- Area served: Canada
- Owner: VMedia
- Key people: Alexei Tchernobrivets (Founder); George Burger (Founder)
- Products: OTT Internet TV, IPTV, Streaming media, Video on demand, Television on demand, MVPD
- Website: www.rivertv.ca

RiverTV is a Canadian over-the-top media service (OTT) streaming television service owned by VMedia that launched on June 4, 2020. RiverTV is a virtual multichannel video programming distributor (vMVPD), (Note: Or equivalently "virtual broadcast distribution undertaking" (vBDU), using the CRTC terminology for TV service providers.) primarily offering Canadian specialty channels and video on demand content.

The service initially launched in a closed beta on May 4, 2020, before releasing publicly in June with a free 7-day trial offer for new subscribers.

RiverTV is the first standalone Live TV service to launch in Canada; StackTV, a streaming package offered by Corus Entertainment that functions similarly, launched the previous year in 2019.

== Programming ==
In addition to live linear feeds and on demand services from various domestic television broadcasters, RiverTV also distributes several U.S-based networks not available on traditional TV providers.

=== Canadian networks ===
- Blue Ant Media
  - Cottage Life
  - Makeful
  - Smithsonian Channel
  - T+E
- CBC/Radio-Canada
  - CBC
  - CBC News Network
  - ICI Tele
  - ICI RDI
  - ICI Explora
  - ICI ARTV
- Channel Zero
  - CHCH Hamilton
  - Rewind
  - Silver Screen Classics
- Corus Entertainment
  - Adult Swim
  - Cartoon Network Canada
  - Crime + Investigation Canada
  - Flavour Network
  - Global TV (feed varies depending on the province)
  - The History Channel
  - History2
  - Home Network
  - Lifetime Canada
  - MovieTime
  - National Geographic
  - Showcase
  - Slice
  - Treehouse
  - YTV
  - W Network

=== Add-ons ===
- Daystar Television Canada
- ducktv
- Euronews (French only)
- France 24
- Hollywood Suite
- M6 International
- Mezzo Live HD
- Planète+
- Rai Italia
- Rai News 24
- Rai World Premium
- StudioCanal
- Super Channel

=== Former ===
- Bloomberg Quicktake
- Cheddar
- Documentary Channel
- i24 News
- Law & Crime
- Newsmax TV
- Newsy
- Revolt
- TRT Arabi
- TRT World
- WildBrain
  - Family Channel
  - Family Jr.
  - WildBrainTV

== Availability ==
As of July 2020, RiverTV's content can be accessed through the service's apps for Roku, Amazon Fire TV, Apple TV, Android TV, Chromecast, and iOS devices within Canada.
