= Jane Gray (broadcaster) =

Canadian broadcaster (1896–1984)

- Born: 1896; Croydon, England, U.K.
- Died: March 20, 1984 (aged 87–88); Hamilton, Ontario, Canada
- Occupations: Radio and television broadcaster
- Years active: 1924–1979
- Spouse: Earl Gray
- Children: 3
- Awards: Canadian Association of Broadcasters Hall of Fame

Elsie Gray (1896 – March 20, 1984), known professionally as Jane Gray, was an English-born Canadian radio and television broadcaster who was active between 1924 and 1979. She was one of the first women to pursue a career in radio broadcasting in Canada, and was inducted into the Canadian Association of Broadcasters Hall of Fame in 1988.

== Early years ==
She was born in Croydon, England in 1896 and grew up there. She was interested in theater from an early age, but her parents were religious Baptists and did not want her to be an entertainer. However, they did permit her to sing for church groups, and she also did some performances during World War I to entertain the troops. After marrying a British military officer named Earl Gray, she came with him to Canada as a war bride in 1919; they settled in London, Ontario, where they raised their three children, Earl Jr. (nicknamed "Buddy"), Kenneth, and Dorothy. But when the marriage failed and she separated from her husband in 1924, she needed to support her children; jobs in London did not pay very well, so she decided to move her family to Toronto, where she believed she could find more lucrative opportunities for employment.

== Radio career ==
Gray's radio career began in October 1924. Some sources have stated, erroneously, that she was Canada's first female broadcaster; but researcher Peggy Stewart, in her 2012 book Radio Ladies: Canada's Women on the Air 1922-1975, tells the stories of women who were on the air as early as 1922, including Mary Conquest of CFAC in Calgary and Elizabeth MacAdam of CKMC in Cobalt. But there is no denying that Gray was one of Canada's early women announcers, and she went on to have one of the longest careers of any female broadcaster, a career that lasted for more than five decades. Her radio career had begun when she joined station CJGC in London, Ontario; she hosted a program where she read poetry. She also gave advice to the listeners; by some accounts, this was the first advice program on Canadian radio. At that time, she did not use the name "Jane Gray"—she used her actual name, Elsie Gray. But she met a numerologist who told her that the combination of letters in her name was unlucky; she decided to select a different and shorter name, and chose "Jane Gray."

By 1927, Gray was living in Toronto, where she was hired by CFRB and then CFCA. She also continued her advice show on radio stations in Toronto. She developed a strategy for making money, even in radio's early years when few stations were financially successful: would pay for airtime on a radio station, and then sell commercials on the shows she hosted; her programs were popular, and she quickly began making a profit. By 1928, she had also founded an acting troupe, the Jane Gray Players, which performed both short and long form radio drama. Some of the first presentations she produced were half-hour mystery plays, over Toronto station CFCA, owned at that time by the Toronto Star. She was then hired by CKNC in Toronto. One day, she needed a ride to work and couldn't find a taxi. A young man was driving by and she flagged him down and asked if he would take her to the radio station. He did, and to show her gratitude, she offered him a chance to take part in her radio show as one of the Jane Gray Players. That young man was Ken Soble, who would go on to become a major force in Canadian broadcasting.

== Success ==
By this time, Gray had started to make a name for herself. She not only wrote, produced, and acted in radio plays, but she also held drama school classes on Saturday mornings. In addition to becoming popular with women radio listeners, Gray also began writing a column for housewives in the Toronto Globe & Mail. During the late 1920s and throughout the 1930s, her column, which was called the Home Forum, provided advice. She also shared recipes that readers sent in, or offered homemaking tips. And she let her readers know about what her own children were doing. On radio and in print, she became known for trying to solve the problems of her audience: people would write to her about family tragedies, illnesses, financial problems, and if she couldn't solve the problem herself, she would use her programs or her column to let others know and try to find solutions that way. In fact, her newspaper promoted her problem-solving abilities in regular advertisements: readers and radio listeners were encouraged to write to her for guidance, because she "has shown the way to happiness... to thousands of men and women."

She also became known as a pitch-woman, making appearances and doing testimonials for various products, several of which claimed to be "miracle elixirs." She assumed the role of "Princess Mus-Kee-Kee," promoting a medicinal tonic called Mus-Kee-Kee that promised to cure a wide range of health problems; the sponsor expected her to dress in a faux-Indian costume, and she made appearances across Canada, selling bottles of the product. She also developed a successful side-business as an astrologer and numerologist. Ads placed in newspapers in every city in which she appeared referred to her as "The Wise Little Lady of the Air," speaking of her "common sense advice and sound philosophy."

== Later years ==
In the early 1940s, she took a brief hiatus from broadcasting to care for her son Buddy, who was living in Calgary and had become gravely ill; he died of cancer at age 20, in 1942. She remained in Calgary for a while, before returning to Toronto and getting back into broadcasting work, once again giving advice and being inspirational to her audience. As a way of coping with her grief, she became involved with making toys and other crafts. Her specialty was stuffed animals for children. She displayed her crafts and toys at hobby shows, and her work became popular, especially with fans who had enjoyed listening to her on the radio.

In addition to her radio work, beginning in 1953, she became a television host on CHCH-TV in Hamilton. The station was founded by Ken Soble, who had never forgotten her. He nicknamed her "Duchess," and hired her for his radio station, CHML, as well as for his TV station. At CHCH-TV, she was the longtime host of a Saturday morning program called Hobby Time, devoted to crafts. Well into the 1960s, when styles of broadcasting had become smoother and more sophisticated, Gray was considered timeless by her fans: critics might call her corny and old-fashioned, but in a typical week, she would receive as many as 800 letters. She became known for interviewing well-known celebrities, including Liberace, Bob Hope, and Sophie Tucker, and she also interviewed local people.

Gray retired from full-time broadcasting in 1979, but continued to work as an occasional freelancer, filling in whenever CHCH needed her, until her death. She died after a brief illness on March 20, 1984—sources differ as to if she was aged 87 or 88—in St. Joseph's Hospital, Hamilton.
