= Halla Bol! Kids TV =

Canadian Hindi-language television channel

- Country: Canada
- Broadcast area: Canada; United States
- Headquarters: Toronto, Ontario

Programming
- Language: Hindi

Ownership
- Owner: Channel Zero
- Sister channels: CHCH-DT; Silver Screen Classics; Rewind

History
- Launched: January 16, 2014; 12 years ago

Links
- Website: hallabol.ca

Halla Bol! Kids TV is a Canadian Category B-exempt Hindi language specialty channel owned by Channel Zero. Halla Bol! Kids TV broadcasts programming primarily aimed at children in addition to select family-oriented programming.

== History ==
On January 9, 2012, FDR Media Group was given approval by the Canadian Radio-television and Telecommunications Commission (CRTC) to launch a specialty channel named "Hindi Children Channel", described as "a national, niche third-language ethnic Category 21 specialty programming undertaking that would consist of programs focussing on South Asian culture and entertainment catering to Canadian children of South Asian ethnicity from 3 to 10 years of age." Later that month, the channel was officially named Halla Bol! Kids TV.

At an undisclosed point, FDR's broadcast licenses were acquired by Channel Zero. Halla Bol! Kids TV debuted exclusively on Bell Fibe on January 16, 2014. On August 4, 2014, the channel launched in the United States through Dish Network and Sling TV. It was later made available on Rogers Cable and Telus Optik TV.

At the request of Channel Zero, the CRTC revoked the channel's Canadian broadcast license on February 21, 2018. The company continues to operate the channel under exempt status.

== Programming ==
Since 2021, Halla Bol! Kids TV's programming consists of a single series, Gullu & Mollu Travel Rangers.

Halla Bol! Kids TV previously aired a mixture of children's and family-oriented programming from India (including Galli Galli Sim Sim and Karadi Tales) as well as dubbed Canadian series (including Harry and His Bucket Full of Dinosaurs and Artzooka!). Programming was mainly in Hindi, but also in Punjabi, Urdu and English.
