= Dan McLean (journalist) =

Canadian television and radio journalist (1947–2026)

- Born: October 12, 1947; Orillia, Ontario, Canada
- Died: April 28, 2026 (aged 78); Owen Sound, Ontario, Canada
- Occupations: News anchor, journalist
- Years active: 1962–2013
- Employer: Canwest (2000–2008)
- Spouse: Allison
- Children: 3

Dan McLean (October 12, 1947 – April 28, 2026) was a Canadian news anchor, who latterly worked for Mix 106.5 FM in Owen Sound, Ontario, having earlier been a senior news anchor for CHCH-TV in Hamilton, Ontario.

== Early life and career ==
McLean grew up in Orillia, Ontario and started his journalism career working part-time at a Welland radio station when he was just 15 years old. He then went on to numerous radio jobs in many southern Ontario cities including Kitchener-Waterloo area (CYHM, CKCO and CKWR). After a couple of radio news anchor jobs in Saskatchewan (Regina and Saskatoon), McLean moved back to Ontario, and in 1971, began his long career at CHCH-TV in Hamilton. He started out as a commercial announcer, and got his first television stint as host of the CHCH-TV documentary program, "Mid-Day", which was taped at Hamilton Place.

== CHCH-TV ==
In 1980, after former CHCH-TV anchors Tom Cherington and Norm Marshall left their positions, McLean become anchor of the 6:00 pm and 11:00 pm newscasts, positions that he would hold throughout most of his career at CHCH. He also occasionally co-hosted the noon hour newscast in the 1990s.

During his tenure at CHCH, McLean became well known for his charity work and achievements. He raised millions of dollars for the Hamilton and Burlington United Way, the McMaster Children's Hospital, and the Hamilton Regional Cancer Centre. He has also hosted many fundraising galas and dinners featuring well-known celebrities and politicians.

His achievements include OAB Broadcaster of the Year, the Queen's Jubilee Medal, Canwest Spirit of the Community Award, International Red Cross Humanitarian Award, OAB Howard Caine Community Achievement Award, the RTNDA Association of Electronic Journalists lifetime achievement award and was Hamilton's Distinguished Citizen of the Year in 2001.

McLean left CHCH on December 12, 2008 (the day of his last newscast), after being laid off by CHCH's parent Canwest amidst the financial troubles, ending his almost 40-year career at the station.

== Later career ==
McLean briefly considered getting into politics in 2009, when he became a potential candidate for the federal Liberal Party in Ancaster—Dundas—Flamborough—Westdale, but he withdrew his candidacy for personal reasons.

On August 23, 2010, McLean returned to his radio roots, when he moved to Owen Sound and became the co-host of Mix 106.5's morning show, as well as anchoring the morning and noon hour newscasts. He officially retired from newscasting in July 2013, without any on-air formal announcement. However, he occasionally filled in when needed.

== Personal life and death ==
McLean and his wife, Allison, had three children.

He died on April 28, 2026, aged 78.
