= Rewind (TV channel) =

Canadian television channel

- Logo used since 2012
- Country: Canada
- Broadcast area: National
- Headquarters: Toronto, Ontario

Programming
- Picture format: 1080i (HDTV) (2013-present); 480i (SDTV) (2001-present)

Ownership
- Owner: Channel Zero (85%); Other investors (15%)
- Sister channels: CHCH-DT; Silver Screen Classics; Halla Bol! Kids TV

History
- Launched: September 7, 2001; 24 years ago
- Former names: Movieola (2001–2012)

Links
- Website: Rewind

Availability

Streaming media
- RiverTV: Over-the-top TV

Rewind is a Canadian English language specialty channel majority-owned by Channel Zero Inc.

The channel primarily broadcasts feature-length films from the 1970s, 1980s and 1990s, targeting the Generation X demographic.

== History ==
In November 2000, Channel Zero (through its subsidiary known at the time as Late Night Vidiots) was granted approval by the Canadian Radio-television and Telecommunications Commission (CRTC) to launch a channel called Movieola, described as "a national English-language Category 2 specialty television service dedicated to the broadcast of short films ranging in length from 30 seconds to 40 minutes."

The channel was launched on September 7, 2001 as Movieola, specializing in short film content in various genres such as animation, comedy, and drama.

Less than a month after the channel's launch, Stornoway Communications, also a new broadcaster, owner of recently launched ichannel and bpm:tv, announced that it was purchasing a majority interest in the channel, subject to conditions and CRTC approval. However, the deal fell through in April 2002, when due to financial difficulties, Stornoway Communications laid-off two of the four founding members of Movieola in February, and a third in April. The fourth member resigned in April. The four founding members were hired by Stornoway in September 2001 when the purchase agreement was made. The agreement stated that all four members were to remain as Stornoway employees after the transaction closed. Due to Stornoway's reluctance to rehire the employees, the deal was severed in April and the four founding members decided to run Movieola alone.

In June 2007, Movieola signed a deal with Joost, agreeing to provide short film content to the online TV service. Movieola later signed a similar deal with the online service, Hulu.

In September 2008, Movieola announced it was purchasing a majority stake in Propeller TV, at the time, a British-based television channel featuring films and television series from primarily new and emerging artists. However, the deal was abandoned at a later date and did not finalize.

In an interview with C21 Media in November 2011, Cal Millar, Channel Zero's President and COO, revealed the company's intentions of possibly shifting the channel's focus away from exclusively airing short film content, citing "short film hasn’t translated as well as we’d have liked it to on TV.”

On September 25, 2012 at the annual Canadian Cable Systems Alliance Conference in Huntsville, Ontario, Millar announced that Channel Zero would be shuttering Movieola on December 1, 2012 and move it to an exclusively online brand through Hulu in the United States and an app in Canada. Through cable, satellite, and IPTV systems in Canada, Channel Zero would be launching a new television channel in its place called Rewind, a film channel targeted to the Generation X demographic with films from 1970s and 1980s for example. It was later revealed that Movieola's broadcast licence would be used to launch Rewind. On December 1, 2012 Movieola was rebranded as Rewind and the Movieola brand shifted to an online-only service. Rewind continues to broadcast short film content in non-peak viewing hours.

In August 2014, Channel Zero was successful in its application with the CRTC to be relieved of its requirement to broadcast short-form programming and its nature of service was amended to state the channel shall be "dedicated to short films and to action and adventure programming. Its action and adventure programming will “run the gamut” from contemporary “popcorn” action and adventure films and series to classical westerns." In addition, 15% of the channel was sold to a variety of investors through a corporate restructuring.

== Rewind HD ==
On June 11, 2013, Channel Zero launched a high definition channel simulcasting the standard definition feed called Rewind HD on EastLink. The channel has been subsequently picked up by other television service providers such as Telus Optik TV.
