= Norm Marshall =

Canadian broadcaster (1918–2008)

- Born: 1918
- Died: 5 November 2008; Burlington, Ontario
- Occupation: broadcaster
- Known for: Commentator on first Grey Cup telecast in 1952

Norm Marshall (1918 – 5 November 2008) was a Canadian radio and television broadcaster. He and Larry O'Brien were commentators for the first telecast of a Grey Cup football game 29 November 1952 on CBLT Toronto. CBC paid both Marshall and O'Brien CAD$250 for this inaugural broadcast. He was inducted into the Canadian Football Hall of Fame in 1989.

== Biography ==
Marshall's radio broadcasting career began with CKTB in St. Catharines, Ontario, first singing for the station then announcing. In 1940, he was broadcasting for CHML at Hamilton, Ontario. When CHCH-TV began broadcasts in that city in 1954, Marshall was among its first personalities. For 16 seasons until 1970, Marshall and Ivor Wynne broadcast Hamilton Tiger-Cats and collegiate games.

The Fred Sgambati Media Award was awarded to Marshall in 1988 for his broadcast work for university sports.

CBC Television's pre-game segments for the 95th Grey Cup in November 2007 featured Marshall's recollection of the early Grey Cup broadcasts.

== Career ==
=== Radio ===
- CKTB - St. Catharines, Ontario
- 1940: CHML - Hamilton, Ontario
- CJAD - Montreal, Quebec
- CKLW - Windsor, Ontario
- WKBW - Buffalo, New York
- 1953: Grey Cup radio commentator
- 1967: CHAM - Hamilton, Ontario - operations manager

=== Television ===
- 1952: CBC Television - commentator, Grey Cup broadcasts
- 1954-1988: CHCH-TV - Hamilton, Ontario - news and sports announcer
