= Roy Green (radio) =

Canadian radio personality

- Born: 1947 (age 78–79); Switzerland
- Occupation: broadcaster

Roy Green (born 1947) is a radio personality who was based in Hamilton, Ontario, Canada for much of his career.

== Biography ==
He was born in Switzerland and moved to Montreal as a young child.

Green started his radio career there at a rock station CKGM as a teen.

== Career ==
Green moved to Hamilton and started work at CHML on January 3, 1973. He has also worked at Toronto's AM 640, as well as hosting a regional Ontario network program. Green retired from daily broadcasting on March 30, 2007 but continued to host the Roy Green Show, heard nationally, on Corus Radio Saturdays and Sundays from 2 to 5pm ET. At the end of 2024, he announced that he would be retiring altogether and that his last show would air on January 26, 2025 to tend to his health. He had earlier announced he had been diagnosed with stage 4 prostate cancer.

He was a finalist in the City of Hamilton's 'Distinguished Citizen of the Year' in 2003, being inducted into the City of Hamilton's Gallery of Distinction in 2008, and was a recipient three consecutive times of the Canadian Association of Broadcasters' 'Gold Ribbon' as 'Best in Canada'.

Green also worked as a fill-in host on the Charles Adler Show on CHML and had continued working for station owner Corus Radio on special projects.
