= Ken Soble =

Canadian broadcasting executive

Kenneth David Soble (June 12, 1911 – December 16, 1966) was a Canadian broadcasting executive, who became the owner of radio station CHML and was one of the founders of CHCH-TV, both of which were in Hamilton, Ontario. Under his management, CHCH withdrew from the CBC Television Network in 1961 to become Canada's first independent television station. He was also the original applicant for what would eventually become Canada's Global Television Network, although the application underwent numerous changes before being transferred to a separate company, unrelated to Soble's Niagara Television, in 1970. One indication of the esteem in which he was held was that the Canadian Broadcasting Corporation offered him the job of president of the network in late 1966; but he decided to turn it down.

== Early life ==
Soble was born in Toronto; his father's name was Jacob and his mother's name was Rebecca. Jacob (Jack) Soble worked in a clothing factory, until he became ill and unable to work. Ken left school at age 15 (some sources say age 16) in order to help his family; his first job was as a door-to-door salesman. Soble's entry into broadcasting occurred by accident, circa 1927, when he helped a woman who needed a ride to the radio station where she worked. Her name was Jane Gray, and she had a radio drama troupe, the Jane Gray Players. She showed her appreciation for the ride by giving him a chance to perform on the air. From that unpaid position, Soble found paid work at several stations, selling air time, and doing some announcing of both music shows and sports programs. By 1936, he had started his own broadcasting company, Metropolitan Broadcasting Service, Ltd. Around that time, he got the idea for a radio amateur hour, similar to those already on the air in the United States, such as the one hosted by Major Bowes. Ken Soble's Amateur Hour was first broadcast on CKCL in Toronto, but he was soon able to expand it to a regional network; ultimately, it aired across Canada and became one of the country's most popular programs, even though, by his own admission, the show was "corny." Around 1936, after working for CKCL and then CFRB, he became general manager of CHML in Hamilton; only seven years later, at age 31, Soble was able to buy the station from the former owner, Senator Arthur Hardy in 1942 after winning a bidding war against Roy Thomson and Jack Kent Cooke. Meanwhile, during World War II, Soble decided to retire the Amateur Hour to concentrate on organizing entertainment programs for Canada's troops. But after the war, in 1946, the Amateur Hour returned to CHML by popular demand; Soble also used the program to stage benefit performances that raised funds for worthy causes, such as several hospitals, the Red Cross, and Easter Seals. In addition to supporting national causes, Soble also funded the building of a Jewish Community Center in Hamilton.

== Successful executive ==
Soble became known for his devotion to live and local radio. He believed that radio (and later television) should both entertain and inform the public. While popular programs like the Amateur Hour provided entertainment, he also wanted to further the mission of providing information. He felt strongly that radio should help the public to "keep tabs on their elected representatives," so he began broadcasting Hamilton city council meetings on CHML in 1945. He also expanded his radio news staff to make sure they were thoroughly covering local politics. He was also able to repay the kindness that Jane Gray had shown him so many years ago: when she wanted to return to radio after some time away from broadcasting, he hired her at CHML and gave her an advice and interview program.

While well known as a radio executive, Soble was quick to embrace television. CHCH-TV, channel 11, in Hamilton, went on the air as a CBC affiliate in 1954, but in 1961, Soble decided to take the station independent. It worked out well: CHCH-TV became "the most profitable independent television station in Canada." One especially popular program Soble created for the station was Tiny Talent Time, a talent show for children twelve years old and under. It debuted in 1957 and it ran for more than thirty years, until it was canceled in 1992.

In 1953, Soble purchased the Barton Arena as well as the Hamilton Tigers hockey team of the OHA Senior League; he planned to build a new arena, to be called the Hamilton Forum, to replace the antiquated arena where the Tigers had been playing. He also bought the Hamilton Cubs of the OHA Junior League. Subsequently, he became a governor of the Hamilton Tiger Cat football club.

In addition to being a radio station manager and owner, and the owner of a sports franchise, he was asked by the mayor of Hamilton to help the city with its public housing crisis in 1961. He won public support for the city's urban renewal plans, and was subsequently appointed to the Ontario housing advisory committee, and became its chairman. He was also involved in many other civic projects, including backing a medical school for Hamilton's McMaster University.

== Network proposal ==
In an era before cable TV became well-known, Soble was already envisioning turning CHCH-TV into a "satellite superstation." He wanted to establish a new Canada-wide television network, submitting a brief to the Board of Broadcast Governors in 1966 proposing a satellite-fed network to be branded as NTV; the idea was controversial at the time, as it would have required the BBG to grant Soble 96 additional licenses for rebroadcasting stations in local media markets in addition to his existing license for CHCH as the network's planned flagship. Soble had originally formulated the plan after failing in a bid to acquire CTV.

== Final years ==
Soble died suddenly on December 16, 1966. He had been ill for several weeks, and both overwork and exhaustion were cited as factors in his death. The official cause of death was a heart attack. He was only 55 years old. His death was mourned by political figures, broadcasting colleagues, and many people who regarded him as a humanitarian; even Canada's Prime Minister Lester Pearson issued a statement expressing his regrets. Soble's widow Frances took over his position as president of CHCH and CHML, while a former employee of his, Al Bruner, shepherded the first full application for a network in 1968. After leaving Niagara Television in 1969, Bruner established Global Communications, which resubmitted a revised network proposal in 1970 and eventually won the license to launch the Global network. Also, in 1988, Soble's daughter Donna Soble Kaufman, who had been raised around CHML and CHCH-TV, spent a year running Selkirk Communications, the company that owned both properties at that time.

Soble was posthumously inducted into the CAB's Hall of Fame in 1985. In 2007, he was posthumously inducted into CHML's Hall of Fame.
