= Al Bruner =

Canadian television executive (1923–1987)

Al Bruner (1923–1987) was a Canadian television broadcaster, most noted as the co-founder of the Global Television Network.

== Before Global ==
Bruner was born in Leamington, Ontario in 1923. In his early days Bruner sang in Wayne King's Detroit orchestra, but soon found his way into broadcasting by helping to establish the Toronto-based television station CFTO-TV, which went on the air in 1961. However, Bruner's eyes turned to Hamilton when the founder of CHCH-TV, Ken Soble, asked him to become the sales manager at his station, which had recently become disaffiliated with the Canadian Broadcasting Corporation, and was the first independent television station in Canada.

With the financial backing of Power Corporation of Canada, Soble put forward a proposal to the Board of Broadcast Governors in 1966 for a national television network which would broadcast by satellite, with CHCH as its flagship. Soble died just a few months after submitting his original proposal, and Bruner took over the application process. Power Corporation backed out of the application in 1969, and Bruner was fired from Niagara Television.

== At Global Television ==
Along with Peter Hill, Bruner then founded Global Communications to continue the network license application. The new company was ultimately granted a six-transmitter network in southern Ontario, stretching from Windsor to Ottawa, in 1972, but could not obtain a transmitter that would reach Montreal. The network, which promised high levels of local content, launched on January 6, 1974. However, after three months in business the station ran into financial trouble and was purchased by Canwest.

After leaving Global, Bruner worked on devising broadcasting technology, and pitched his idea of local insertion, unheard of at the time, to the broadcasting community in New York. However, his ideas never reached fruition as he died in a New York post office of a heart attack in 1987.
