= Bell TV =

Bell TV may refer to:

- Bell Fibe TV, an IP-based television service offered by Bell Canada in the Canadian provinces of Ontario and Quebec
- Bell Mobile TV, a former mobile television service available to Bell Mobility and Virgin Mobile Canada customers
- Bell Satellite TV, which provides satellite television service in Canada

== See also ==
- Virgin TV, an IP-based television and Internet service bundle offered by Bell Canada with Virgin branding
