= Tiny Talent Time =

Canadian children's television series

- Also known as: Today's Talent Time (2000–2001)
- Genre: variety show
- Starring: Bill Lawrence (1957–1992); Sandy Savelli (2000–2001); Mike Gravina (2000–2001); Jaclyn Colville (2014-present); Jason Agnew (2014-present)
- Country of origin: Canada

Original release
- Network: CHCH-DT
- Release: 1957 – present

Tiny Talent Time is a Canadian children's television series, which has aired in various formats on CHCH-TV in Hamilton, Ontario, and in other markets via syndication, since 1957. A variety show, the series features children, aged 12 or under, demonstrating their talents in various performing arts.

The original series, hosted by Bill Lawrence throughout its run, aired from 1957 to 1992. It was created as a children's version of station owner Ken Soble's long-running radio and television series Ken Soble's Amateur Hour. Noted performers on the original series included Sheila Copps reciting a poem, Deborah Cox as a singer, and Frank Augustyn performing a gymnastics routine. In addition to local children, the series attracted performers from throughout Southern Ontario and even from Buffalo, New York. By the time of its cancellation in 1992, it was second only to CBC Television's Front Page Challenge as the longest-running television series in Canadian history.

The series was briefly revived in 2000 as Today's Talent Time, hosted by Sandy Savelli and Mike Gravina. Savelli and the program's executive producer Beth McBlain had both been performers on the original series. The revival also included a "Time Capsule" segment, in which people who had performed on the original series were profiled. The new series lasted a single season.

The series was again revived in 2014 under its original title, now hosted by Jaclyn Colville and Jason Agnew. The revived series was a shortlisted Canadian Screen Award nominee for Children's or Youth Non-Fiction Program at the 4th Canadian Screen Awards in 2016.
