= Revolt (TV network) =

Music-oriented cable television network

- Country: United States
- Broadcast area: Nationwide (select areas)
- Headquarters: Los Angeles, California

Programming
- Language: English
- Picture format: 1080i (HDTV); 480i (SDTV)

Ownership
- Owner: Revolt Media & TV

History
- Launched: October 21, 2013
- Founder: Sean Combs; Andy Schuon

Links
- Website: revolt.tv

Availability

Streaming media
- Sling TV: Internet Protocol television
- DirecTV Now: Internet Protocol television
- FuboTV: Internet Protocol television
- Philo: Internet Protocol television

Revolt is an American music-oriented digital cable television network and media company founded by Sean Combs and Andy Schuon. The TV network launched on October 21, 2013, as part of a larger agreement with Comcast. As of 2024, Detavio Samuels is the chief executive officer, while the company's employees are the majority shareholding group.

Revolt's cable network is primarily dedicated to hip-hop and hip-hop culture, and urban contemporary music. The network's non-music programming covers African-American culture, as well as social justice issues.

As of July 2021, Revolt's cable network was available in 50 million U.S. households.

== History ==
=== Background ===
First logo, used until 2020

As part of its arrangement to acquire a minority interest in NBCUniversal, Comcast committed to carry several minority-owned networks. The arrangement followed pressure led by Maxine Waters in congressional hearings. In April 2011, Comcast solicited proposals for minority-owned networks.

In February 2012, Comcast announced distribution arrangements for four networks, including Revolt. The four announced networks and six forthcoming stations were being chosen from among in excess of 100 proposals to begin airing by 2020. On October 1, 2013, Revolt announced that it would debut in New York City, Los Angeles and Chicago on October 21.

=== Expansion ===
AT&T U-verse added the SD feed on July 27, 2015, and the HD feed on November 24, 2015; DirecTV would add the feed on December 24, 2015.

On October 18, 2019, Ziggo announced that it would launch a Netherlands version of Revolt on November 1, 2019, in-collaboration with Dutch record label TopNotch, and AreaMedia. Its programming would consist of interviews, news, hip-hop documentaries, live events, and music videos. During its first months of broadcast, the US version of the channel would be shown on a 6-hour delay; from January 2020, Dutch programmes would be broadcast. The Dutch version was eventually closed on February 1, 2021.

In Canada, Revolt would be part of the launch lineup of Live TV service RiverTV on June 4, 2020.

=== Departure of Combs; employee ownership ===
On November 28, 2023, Combs said he would take a leave of absence amidst sexual assault lawsuits; it was unclear when he would return to the company. At the time, Combs was not involved with Revolt's day-to-day operations. In March 2024, Combs sold his stake in Revolt to an anonymous buyer.

On June 4, 2024, Revolt revealed that “Shares held by the company’s former chair have been fully redeemed and retired”, and that they have transferred majority ownership to its employees in order to keep the outlet Black-owned. CEO Detavio Samuels, who joined in 2020, spoke to Billboard in an interview expressing hope that “more CEOs embrace and embody this idea of linked prosperity: if the company wins, every single person wins. We’re trying to set an industry standard where this type of thing becomes the norm.”

== Revolt Films ==
Revolt Films is a separate entity from the network, founded before its launch, but using the same name for brand association. It specializes in developing, producing, and financing films and original television content.

- Lawless (2012; one year before the network launched; its first full-length feature film).
- Dope (2015)
