= Arthur Charles Hardy =

Canadian politician

The Honourable Arthur Charles Hardy PC
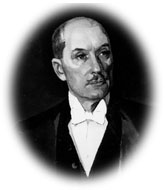

Speaker of the Senate of Canada
- In office May 13, 1930 – September 2, 1930
- Preceded by: Hewitt Bostock
- Succeeded by: Pierre Édouard Blondin

Canadian Senator from Ontario
- In office February 10, 1922 – March 13, 1962
- Appointed by: William Lyon Mackenzie King

Personal details
- Born: December 3, 1872 Brantford, Ontario, Canada
- Died: March 16, 1962 (aged 89) Brockville, Ontario, Canada
- Party: Liberal
- Spouse: Dorothy Fulford
- Relatives: Arthur Sturgis Hardy (father); George Fulford (father-in-law)

Arthur Charles Hardy, PC (December 3, 1872 – March 13, 1962) was a Canadian lawyer and politician.

== Life and career ==
Born in Brantford, Ontario, Hardy ran for the House of Commons of Canada in the Ontario riding of Leeds in the 1917 federal election. Although unsuccessful in that election, he was considered a powerful and influential figure within the Liberal Party.

In 1922, Hardy was called to the Senate of Canada representing the senatorial division of Leeds, Ontario. A Liberal, he served in the Senate for forty years until his death in 1962. In 1930, he was the Speaker of the Senate of Canada.

Hardy was a graduate of Osgoode Hall Law School, and he worked primarily as a lawyer. He was also an owner of radio station CHML in Hamilton, until the station was sold to Ken Soble in 1942. In 1938, he was appointed as a corporate director of Dominion Life.

== Family ==
Hardy was the son of Arthur Sturgis Hardy, who served as the fourth Premier of Ontario from 1896 to 1899. He married Dorothy Fulford, the daughter of Senator George Taylor Fulford.
