= VMedia =

Canadian telecommunications company

- Company type: Division
- Industry: Telecommunications
- Founded: March 26, 2013
- Founder: Alexei Tchernobrivets
- Headquarters: Toronto, Ontario, Canada
- Area served: Ontario, Quebec, Manitoba, Saskatchewan, Alberta, British Columbia, Newfoundland and Labrador, Prince Edward Island, Nova Scotia, New Brunswick
- Products: IPTV, DSL, Cable Internet, VoIP, Home Security
- Owner: Quebecor
- Parent: Freedom Mobile
- Website: vmedia.ca

VMedia is a Canadian telecommunications and broadcast distribution provider.

It offers VoIP telephone and home security services across Canada; DSL and cable Internet in Ontario, Quebec, Manitoba, Saskatchewan, Alberta, and British Columbia; and IPTV television service in Ontario, Quebec, Alberta and British Columbia.

Originally an independent company incorporated as VMedia Inc., the company was acquired by Quebecor in 2022, and its operations were transferred to Quebecor's Freedom Mobile subsidiary in 2025. While the VMedia brand remains active, Freedom has also launched white-label versions of VMedia's TV and Internet services under its own brand.

== History ==
VMedia officially launched on March 26, 2013. Following the launch of its IPTV television service in Ontario, the company announced in 2016 that its intention is to expand service to Quebec, Alberta and British Columbia in the future. On May 31, 2016, VMedia formally launched IPTV service in parts of Quebec, and British Columbia and Alberta on June 22, 2016.

In July 2022, VMedia was quietly acquired by Canadian conglomerate Quebecor. The purchase was not publicized until after its CRTC approval and completion; Quebecor operates the incumbent telecom provider Vidéotron in Quebec, and saw the acquisition, alongside its acquisition of wireless carrier Freedom Mobile in April 2023, as part of a long-term strategy to expand its operations nationally to compete with Bell, Rogers, and Telus.

In September 2022, Quebecor transferred the ownership of VMedia to its subsidiary Vidéotron.

In December 2024, the CRTC approved an application to transfer VMedia and its assets to Freedom Mobile, ultimately leading to the winding down of the company. In January 2025, the transfer was completed, and the company was dissolved.

== Services ==
=== Television ===
VMedia's IPTV service is a traditional subscription television service bundled with over-the-top content delivered through a proprietary Android-based set-top box branded as "VBox". Subscription to the television service requires a VMedia internet plan, due to contracts for some networks and other CRTC regulations requiring the content to only be distributed over a managed network.

On September 16, 2016, VMedia launched an over-the-top "skinny basic" television service available via an app for Roku digital media players. The service offers 20 channels, including major Canadian and U.S. broadcast networks and channels, and all in high definition. Unlike the main television service, this version does not require VMedia internet, and is thus available nationwide.

On June 4, 2020, VMedia launched a wider, national streaming television service known as RiverTV, which features a mix of broadcast networks, specialty channels, and on-demand content, as well as live streaming channels such as Cheddar and Newsy.

=== Internet ===
VMedia provides DSL and cable Internet services as a competitive local exchange carrier by purchasing wholesale bandwidth from major network providers including Bell, Rogers, Cogeco, Vidéotron, Bell Aliant, and Telus.

=== Telephone ===
VMedia offers VoIP telephone service in two tiers: unlimited Canadian long distance or unlimited "World" long distance (to 60 countries).

=== Home Security ===
VMedia offers monitored Home Security service in two tiers: Protect or Protect Plus.

== Carriage disputes ==
In September 2016, Bell Media issued a cease and desist order to VMedia over its Roku-based IPTV service, demanding the removal of all of its networks. Canadian copyright law allows "retransmitters", defined as "a person who performs a function comparable to that of a cable retransmission system", to redistribute local and distant broadcast stations as part of their services. However, this only applies to IPTV services operating over private networks, because the law's definition of a retransmitter does not apply to services operating on new media platforms that are not regulated by the CRTC. VMedia argued that its permission to redistribute these stations fell under its CRTC licensing as a television provider. Bell argued that the over-the-top service did not fall within this definition, or the formal licensing for the IPTV service offered in conjunction with its internet, and thus is a violation of their copyrights. VMedia representative George Burger disputed Bell's arguments, stating that Canadian copyright law was "technologically neutral", and that broadcasters were "happy to provide that content" to similar, U.S.-based services such as Sling TV. However, he also warned that VMedia may not be able to afford litigation on the matter, stating that "Bell has untold millions of dollars that it can afford to spend on litigation. We're a startup. We're trying to find our way to profitability." Pending the result of the lawsuit, VMedia removed CTV and CTV Two from the service.

On November 22, 2016, the Ontario Superior Court of Justice ruled that under current law, VMedia must negotiate carriage agreements with Bell Media to carry its over-the-air channels on an over-the-top service. It added that "If technology has overcome the existing laws and policies, it is open to interested parties to put the issues before the CRTC to try to revise the policies and the definitions".
