= AOV Adult Movie Channel =

- AOV Adult Movie Channel logo
- Country: Canada
- Broadcast area: National
- Headquarters: Richmond Hill, Ontario

Programming
- Picture format: 480i (SDTV)

Ownership
- Owner: Channel Zero
- Sister channels: XXX Action Clips Channel; Maleflixxx Television

History
- Launched: November 2004

Links
- Website: AOV Adult Movie Channel

AOV Adult Movie Channel, also known simply as AOVTV, is a Canadian-exempt English-language discretionary specialty channel. It is a premium television channel consisting of explicit feature pornographic films, scheduled by genre specifically for each viewing demographic. The service was founded by the physical video store chain Adults Only Video. AOV programs and operates the service, along with an equivalent video-on-demand service known as AOVTV On Demand.

== See also ==
- XXX Action Clips Channel
- Maleflixxx Television
