= Condensed Classics with Dave Shaw =

Canadian television show

Condensed Classics (also known as Condensed Classics with Dave Shaw) is a television show that aired on the Canadian Channel Movieola. Although only 25 episodes were produced, the show was run and rerun on Movieola, and later on its sister station Silver Screen Classics. The program was aired as late as April 2013 on Silver Screen Classics, usually late on Saturday nights.

== The Show ==
Condensed Classics was an attempt at reviving the "horror host" format of the 1950s and 1960s. The program aired movies such as The Terror of Tiny Town and Gorgo, which were condensed from their original running time to about 40 minutes, presided over by host and head writer Dave Shaw. The hosted segments of the show would appear four times a broadcast, and rarely had anything to do with the movies. Some of the hosted segments were parodies of different movies, which were usually cult films such as Mulholland Drive and Misery.

== Style ==
Shaw described the show as "What if Dean Martin hosted a horror movie show?", and then ran with that aesthetic. The hosted segments were shot in black and white and featured Shaw wearing a tuxedo in the "Condensed Classics" movie lounge where he'd do short comedy bits, usually with a comely female sidekick in a 1940s era cocktail dress. The sidekicks switched every week, although several were put in return appearances, always as different characters.

== Aftermath ==
The show stopped airing on Movieola completely in 2004 and moved to Silver Screen Classics. A version of Condensed Classics called NEW Condensed Classics, which cut down the movies even more (to about 20 minutes) started airing in 2005. This version of the show was still being run in 2024, not in its own time slot, but frequently playing after scheduled films which had been allotted significantly more time than their actual duration. Shaw was not involved with this version, having been replaced by Tarantella [Alison Phillips], whose host persona was that of a somewhat sultry but fully knowledgeable film expert. The original set and "Rat Pack" aesthetic was gone as well, though Tarantella occasionally wore cocktail dresses.
