= Ici ARTV =

Canadian French arts channel

- Country: Canada
- Broadcast area: National
- Headquarters: Montreal, Quebec

Programming
- Picture format: 480i (SDTV); 1080i (HDTV)

Ownership
- Owner: Canadian Broadcasting Corporation
- Sister channels: Ici Radio-Canada Télé; Ici RDI; Ici Explora

History
- Launched: September 1, 2001
- Former names: ARTV (2001–2013)

Links
- Website: ICI ARTV (in French)

Availability

Streaming media
- RiverTV: Over-the-top TV

Ici ARTV (stylized as ICI artv) is a Canadian French language specialty channel owned by the Canadian Broadcasting Corporation (known in French as Société Radio-Canada). The channel broadcasts the arts and culture including music, dance, theatre, visual arts, films and scripted television series.

== History ==
Ici ARTV was licensed by the Canadian Radio-television and Telecommunications Commission (CRTC) as la Télé des Arts as a joint venture between the Canadian Broadcasting Corporation (CBC), Télé-Québec, Bell Globemedia, Arte (through Arte France, a joint venture of France Télévisions, Radio France and INA, both historically and formerly known as the ORTF and the French state) and L'Équipe Spectra. The channel was launched on September 1, 2001 as ARTV.

In Fall 2007, L’Équipe Spectra sold its seven percent interest in the service to the CBC. CTVglobemedia also announced that it intended to sell its interest in the service to the CBC. The CRTC approved the transaction on June 20, 2008. In late 2010, Télé-Québec sold its interest to the CBC, bringing its total interest to 85%.

On December 10, 2013, the network was re-branded as "Ici ARTV" as part of a plan to unify the CBC's French-language outlets around a single brand.

On March 15, 2015, Arte sold its 15% interest in the channel, leaving the CBC as its sole shareholder.

=== Distribution ===
Although most licensed analogue specialty services are not mandatory carriage on analogue cable systems and can be carried on digital cable, in all French language markets, Ici ARTV is mandatory carriage on analogue cable that receives the highest number of subscribers. In English language markets, this condition does not apply. In regard to satellite providers, Ici ARTV must be offered in a package that contains the greatest number of French language services.

These conditions were applied by the CRTC to ensure the success of the service and that it has the ability to produce programs to fulfill its mandate as an arts and culture service.

== Programming ==
Ici ARTV carries a variety of original programming related to arts and culture including popular TV review show C'est juste de la TV, a local version of the Actors Studio called Viens voir les comédiens, cultural news program ARTVStudio, multiple visual art showcase programs and bande-dessinée show BDQC. They also carry live captations of stage shows, plays, concerts and ballet. ARTV also airs reruns of various Radio-Canada original series including Les revenants, La galère and Musée Eden and nostalgic programming like Anne of Green Gables, Little House on the Prairie and Le temps d'une paix. Foreign series (Girls, Borgen, Criminal Justice) are also presented.

=== List of aired programs ===
- Elles (The L Word)
- L'Actors Studio
- Chic
- Visite libre
- Anne… La maison aux pignons verts
- Callas et Onassis
- Design
- La Vie, la vie
- Portraits
- Toute une soirée...
- Slings & Arrows

== Ici ARTV HD ==
On May 3, 2008, ARTV launched a high-definition simulcast of itself called "ARTV HD".

== Logos ==
2001-2004

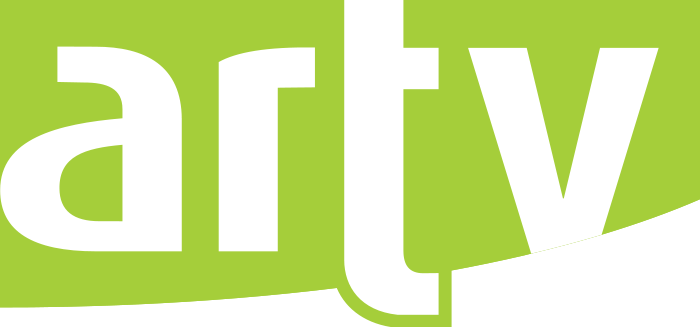
2004-2008

2008–2011

2010-2013 (ARTV HD)

2013-2016

== See also ==
- List of Canadian television channels
