= Maleflixxx Television =

- Maleflixxx Television logo
- Country: Canada
- Broadcast area: National

Programming
- Picture format: 480i (SDTV)

Ownership
- Owner: Channel Zero
- Sister channels: AOV Adult Movie Channel; XXX Action Clips Channel

History
- Launched: November 2004

Links
- Website: Maleflixxx Television

Maleflixxx Television is a Canadian exempt English language specialty channel. It is a premium adult entertainment television channel, with programming consisting of gay male pornography. It is also noted as the first 24-hour channel of its kind in the world. Maleflixxx Television also has plans to be distributed internationally in the future, including the United States and Europe.

Maleflixx Television is owned by Channel Zero Inc. in conjunction with Sureflix Digital Distribution (a provider of gay adult programming) who program and operate the service.

The channel is presumed defunct, as its website is no longer functional (as of 2026), with the last major news story published about it addressing coming from a 2014 controversy with the Canadian Radio-television and Telecommunications Commission for failure to meet CanCon rules, and the website of its (presumably former) parent company failing to mention the channel in any way.

== See also ==
- AOV Adult Movie Channel
- XXX Action Clips Channel
