= Ici Explora =

Canadian French-language television channel

- Country: Canada
- Broadcast area: National
- Headquarters: Montreal, Quebec

Programming
- Picture format: 480i (SDTV); 720p (HDTV)

Ownership
- Owner: Canadian Broadcasting Corporation
- Sister channels: Ici ARTV; Ici Radio-Canada Télé; Ici RDI; TV5 Québec Canada

History
- Launched: March 28, 2012
- Former names: Explora (2012-2013)

Links
- Website: Ici Explora (in French)

Availability

Streaming media
- RiverTV: Over-the-top TV

Ici Explora (stylized as ICI Explora) is a Canadian French language specialty channel owned by the Canadian Broadcasting Corporation (known in French as Société Radio-Canada) that focuses on science, environment, nature, and health programming.

== History ==
Original logo as Explora (2012-2013)

Second logo (2013-2016)

On February 21, 2011, the CBC was granted approval by the Canadian Radio-television and Telecommunications Commission (CRTC) to launch a television channel called Sens, described as "a national, French-language Category 2 specialty programming undertaking that offers programming devoted to scientific discoveries, the environment, nature and human health." The name Sens was an abbreviation consisting of the first letter of each word of the French spelling of each of the channel's four main topics: science, environment, nature, and health (science, environnement, nature, and santé).

The channel was set to launch as Explora on December 1, 2011. However, after some delays, on March 5, 2012, the CBC announced that the channel would be launched on March 28, 2012. The decision to change the channel's name was due to management at the CBC thinking the name Sens would cause confusion among viewers. Although specifics regarding what viewers could confuse the channel with have not been named public, presumably, at least one of the dangers could be viewers confusing the channel as being associated with the National Hockey League club, the Ottawa Senators, which are often referred to as "the Sens", and who was also associated with a part-time pay-per-view channel called Sens TV, which broadcast live Senators' hockey games in its "home market".

The channel was launched on March 28 as planned at 6:00pm ET in both standard and high definition; Vidéotron being the first carrier to distribute the channel.

On December 10, 2013, the network was rebranded to the current name as part of a plan to unify the CBC's French-language outlets around a single brand.
