= Bell Mobile TV =

Canadian mobile television service

Bell Mobile TV is a mobile television service available to Bell Mobility and Virgin Mobile Canada customers. As of Q4 2013, there are 1 230 000 customers with Mobile TV, or over 15.8% of Bell's mobile customer base.

== History ==
=== 2000s: Early versions ===
Early versions of Bell Mobile TV used the slower CDMA network.

=== 2010s: new HSPA+ version and tablet support ===
The Bell Mobile TV was launched for Bell smartphones on October 18, 2010. Support for tablet computer and Virgin Mobile Canada customers was later added.

=== 2015s: Version 5.0 ===
Version 5.0 was launched on Android devices in December 2014 and on iOS in January 2015. The new app introduced new usage metering to allow users to track their viewing time. The application added support for the newer operating systems such as iOS 8 and Lollipop. The video on demand section of the app had an overhaul to allow better navigation of content. Crave TV content was included as a section of Bell Satellite TV app.

== Hardware ==
Early iterations of Bell Mobile TV only supported CDMA handsets with the Evolution-Data Optimized (EV-DO) technology. In the 2010s, support for these older devices was discontinued in favor of faster HSPA+ handsets and technology.

Devices capable of Bell Mobile TV include iOS hardware such as the iPhone and iPad, but not the iPod Touch or the Apple TV. Newer Android and BlackBerry handsets and tablets sold by Bell or Virgin

== Services ==
=== Mobile TV ===
Service plans for Mobile TV cost $5 per month and include 5 hours (formerly 10) of access to all live and on demand channels, with additional hours costing $3 each. If any hours are unused, they cannot be rolled over to the next month.

As of April 29, 2015, Bell Mobile TV usage is counted as part of subscribers' overall mobile data usage. As compensation, subscribers will also receive 5 hours of Mobile TV access over Wi-Fi.

== Channels ==
Bell divides its Mobile TV channels into several themes. Although each previously incurred separate charges, Bell's current rates include access to all channels without having to choose specific themes:

- HBO: Curb Your Enthusiasm, Entourage, Sex and the City and True Blood
- Sports: TSN, TSN2, RDS, RDS2, NFL, NFL Network, NFL RedZone, Vancouver Whitecaps FC and CBN
- English entertainment: CBC, CTV, CTV 2, Stingray Juicebox, MTV, Treehouse TV, YTV, bpm:tv, B4U Music, CTV Comedy Channel, A.Side TV and Makeful
- French entertainment: Radio-Canada, TVA and V
- News: BNN, CBC News Network, CTV News Channel, CP24 (Ontario only), CNN, NDTV 24x7

Channels and programming in italics are On Demand. These channels are also available Live, with the exception of Aux, Bite, Comedy, and all HBO offerings.

== Criticism ==
In 2011, the CRTC ruled in a complaint by Telus that Bell could not use the Mobile TV service to tie exclusive mobile rights to television content (specifically, NHL and NFL games) to its own services without offering them to competing providers.

In December 2013, the CRTC received a complaint alleging that Bell's original pricing structure for Mobile TV was a violation of the undue preference rules in the Telecommunications Act; as the service charged by hours viewed, counting separately from overall mobile data use, it was considered to be an effective subsidy on Bell-owned content transmitted over the mobile network that does not apply to any other competing video services.

On January 29, 2015, the CRTC ruled that Bell had violated the undue preference rules with its mobile TV offerings, and ordered the company to change its pricing structure by April 29, 2015. Effective April 29, 2015, Bell Mobile TV usage counts towards subscribers' overall data usage.
