= CHML =

Radio station in Hamilton, Ontario (1927–2024)

- Hamilton, Ontario; Canada
- Broadcast area: Greater Toronto and Hamilton Area
- Frequency: 900 kHz
- Branding: 900 CHML

Programming
- Format: News-talk

Ownership
- Owner: Corus Entertainment; (Corus Premium Television Ltd.)
- Sister stations: CING-FM; CJXY-FM

History
- First air date: September 28, 1927
- Last air date: August 14, 2024; (96 years, 10 months and 17 days)
- Former frequencies: 880 kHz (1927–1936); 1010 kHz (1936–1941)
- Call sign meaning: Hamilton Maple Leaf

Technical information
- Class: B
- Power: 50,000 watts
- Transmitter coordinates: 43°19′59.88″N 80°7′14.16″W

CHML (900 AM) was a commercial radio station in Hamilton, Ontario, Canada, owned by Corus Entertainment. The station's long-time slogan was "Hometown Radio" and last aired a news/talk format branded as 900 CHML.. It went off the air on August 14, 2024 at 1 p.m., shortly after Corus announced that the station would be closing.

Its power was 50,000 watts, the maximum for Canadian AM stations. It had a directional antenna with an eight-tower array. Its signal was oriented largely west-northwest to east-southeast, covering the Niagara Peninsula and Western New York. The transmitter was located between Peter's Corners and Cambridge. Its studios were located on Main Street West (next to Highway 403) in Hamilton's Westdale neighbourhood. Following the closure and revocation, the former 900 AM frequency was transferred to CHIN, a multicultural radio station in Toronto, in January 2026.

== Early history ==
Some of Canada's best-known broadcasters held the mic at CHML, including Tom Cherington, Paul Hanover, Roy Green, Bill Kelly and Scott Thompson. It signed on the air on September 28, 1927. It began broadcasting as a response to censorship of political discussions by Hamilton's first radio station, CKOC, after that station abruptly "pulled the plug" on a radio broadcast by a minister with the United Church of Canada. Rev. James Hughson was preaching a sermon on Prohibition, a controversial plan to end sales of liquor.

The original owner of CHML was the Maple Leaf Radio Company, operated by George H. Lees. Lees was a former mayor of Hamilton, and one of the elders of Rev. Hughson's church. The "HML" in the call sign stood for "Hamilton Maple Leaf". In those early years, CHML operated at 341 meters (880 kHz). In early December 1934, George Lees sold the station to Senator Arthur Hardy. At that time, CHML was operating with only 50 watts of power, and the new owner hoped to increase it to 100 watts. In 1936, Hardy asked local broadcaster Ken Soble to become the station's manager.

In 1944, Soble was able to purchase CHML, owning it for more than two decades. The station aired a middle of the road (MOR) format of popular adult music, news and information. Shortly after Soble's death in 1966, his estate sold the station to Western Broadcasting, later known as Western International Communications. Corus took over Western's radio assets in late 1999; this included twelve radio stations, among which was CHML. Western oversaw the station's transition from MOR music to a news-talk format. On November 27, 2017, CHML rebranded as Global News Radio 900 CHML.

Former AM 900 CHML logo

Former logo

== Programming ==
CHML's 1927 debut broadcast was typical of its era. Hamilton's mayor gave a brief talk, and then a series of local artists performed live from the new station's studios. The evening's master of ceremonies was tenor Fred Trestrail, who had become well known as a vocalist on CFRB in Toronto. Throughout CHML's early years, the station's programming was a combination of music, news, sports and stock market reports, and religious sermons from area clergy. The music was provided by local performers: one frequent guest was contralto Olive Barlow, and other guest entertainers came from the Tivoli Theatre in downtown Hamilton. The station was an affiliate of CBC Radio's Dominion Network from 1944 until the network dissolved in 1962.

Throughout the years, CHML became well known for local programs, such as live broadcasts of the Hamilton City Council, Ken Soble's Amateur Hour, and the return to radio of veteran broadcaster Jane Gray in the early 1950s. Also popular was Bill Hartnoll, the "Old Garden Doctor" who broadcast advice about gardening for nearly twenty years, during the 1970s and 1980s. CHML was also the voice of the Hamilton Tiger-Cats, broadcasting football from 1950 to 1977, and then again from 1984 to 2015. One of CHML's best-known sportscasters was Norm Marshall, who began doing play-by-play on radio in the mid-1940s, and later expanded his role to cover sports on local television station CHCH-TV; he also did some work for the CBC. He was known as the voice of the Hamilton Tiger-Cats for 26 years. In 2015, Marshall was posthumously inducted into the Hamilton Sports Hall of Fame.

While CHML had an all-talk format in its last years, it did not begin broadcasting daily talk shows until the early 1950s. The station debuted its first talk radio program, a morning call-in show known as "Open Line," in 1954. One announcer who became known for hosting it was Perc Allen, who became the host of "Open Line" in 1959. Allen, who also wrote and broadcast editorials about current issues, later became a news and traffic reporter, and spent several decades as a sportscaster for CHML.

Over the decades, CHML had a number of well-known announcers. Paul Hanover was a popular morning show host during the late 1940s through the early 1980s. He spent a total of 37 years on air at CHML, before being reassigned to an off-air position as Director of Public Relations in 1982. His sign-on was "Hi y'all, this is Paul," and in addition to his morning show, he also broadcast some sports events. He was affectionately referred to as the "Mayor of the Morning". Perhaps the first black announcer at CHML was blues and folk singer Jackie Washington; born and raised in Hamilton, Washington had his own program from 1948 to 1950.

One of the best-known announcers in recent years was Bob Bratina. He had formerly worked in radio in Toronto, and subsequently spent a total of 20 years at CHML, doing a popular morning show called the "Brat Pack". His career at CHML began in the late 1980s. In addition to hosting the morning show, he also became the play-by-play announcer for the Hamilton Tiger-Cats. He left CHML in 1996 and worked at other stations for several years, before returning to CHML in 1999. He remained the morning show host until 2004, when he briefly left to run for political office. Although he won and became a city councilor, he continued with his morning show on CHML. He ultimately gave up his morning show to run for mayor of Hamilton in 2010.

Among other popular announcers on CHML was Tom Cherington, who was an evening talk show host in the 1960s and 1970s. He hosted a program called Action Line. He was also praised by radio critics for his skill as a news-reader. Also popular was John Hardy, a veteran talk show host who spent 22 years at CHML; when Bob Bratina was not working for the station, Hardy did the morning show; prior to that, he was on the air in the afternoon drive shift. When Bratina was re-hired in 1999, Hardy was unexpectedly fired, and Bratina took over the morning show again.

For many years, the Canadian Football League's Hamilton Tiger-Cats and McMaster Marauders Canadian football games were heard on CHML, as were the hockey games of the Hamilton Bulldogs. The relationship between CHML and the Tiger-Cats was particularly long, as CHML had been the flagship station for the team from the year of merger of the Tigers and Wildcats in 1950 until 2014. By 2016, CHML had lost all of its sports rights to CKOC. CHML continued to air its long-running Tiger-Cats postgame show, The 5th Quarter, as an unofficial production; it also joined the Buffalo Bills Radio Network in 2016. CHML regained the rights to the Tiger-Cats in 2021 after CKOC ended its sports programming.

CHML aired old-time radio programs from the 1940s and 1950s nightly, as well as weekends. These shows featured classic NBC and CBS Radio programs. National news was provided by the Canadian Press radio service.

== Closure and revocation ==
On August 14, 2024, at 10:00 a.m., Corus abruptly laid off the entire station staff, leaving the station on automation for the next two hours. News breaks were left unaired as music beds played without any announcements. At noon, an unidentified male Corus executive interrupted the automated feed to issue a 25-second statement announcing the station's shutdown and thanking its advertisers and listeners. At that point, the station ceased programming and went to dead air for the next hour before the transmitter was shut down. Corus cited "years of financial loss" and "the shift of advertising revenues to unregulated foreign platforms" as primary reasons for closing CHML, which came as part of a broader cost-cutting effort at the company.

Corus moved the Tiger-Cats broadcasts to sister station CJXY-FM, as well as airing on affiliates CJOY in Guelph and Rogers Media-owned CKGL in Kitchener. Longtime host Rick Zamperin continued "The 5th Quarter" as a live show on YouTube with his own funding through the remainder of the 2024 season, and was announced in May 2025 as the new co-anchor of Morning Live on the city's CHCH-DT. and as the returning play-by-play voice for the Tiger-Cats. McMaster Marauders football broadcasts moved to its own radio station, CFMU. Hamilton Mayor Andrea Horwath said of the closure, "CHML was Hamilton's DNA. It was the fabric of Hamilton."

The CRTC formally revoked the station's licence on January 17, 2025.

== Use of 900 AM frequency after closure ==
On June 27, 2025, Radio 1540 Limited, the owners of CHIN multicultural radio station in Toronto, submitted an application to change CHIN's AM frequency from 1540 kHz to 900 kHz. The CRTC approved an application on January 15, 2025 to change CHIN’s AM frequency from 1540 kHz to 900 kHz, also allowing CHIN to simulcast programming on its original 1540 kHz frequency for up to 12 months until 2027.
