= Channel Zero (company) =

Canadian broadcasting and media group

2308740 Ontario Inc.
- Trade name: Channel Zero
- Type: Private company
- Industry: Media
- Founded: 2000
- Headquarters: Toronto, Ontario, Canada
- Key people: Cal Millar, President & COO; Romen Podzyhun, Chairman & CEO
- Products: Broadcasting, Television Production
- Website: www.chz.com

2308740 Ontario Inc., doing business as Channel Zero, is an independent Canadian broadcasting and media group, which holds assets in television broadcasting and film distribution. The company is headquartered in Toronto, Ontario, with its main office in the Junction.

== Ownership structure ==
After a settlement following a lawsuit in 2011 with former co-owners Harold Balde and Anthony D'Andrea, "Channel Zero" created a new simplified ownership structure for all of "Channel Zero" licences, under the name 2308740 Ontario Inc.

- C.J. ("Cal") Millar - President and C.O.O; 39.3%
- Romen Podzyhun - Chairman and C.E.O; 39.3%
- Christopher J. Fuoco - Vice-President, Sales and Marketing; 21.4%

== Assets ==
=== Television ===
Channel Zero owns six specialty television channels, including three featuring adult content. CHCH Hamilton is the company's sole over-the-air station, which it acquired from Canwest and took control of on August 31, 2009. It is an independent station licensed to Hamilton, Ontario, and was previously an owned-and-operated station of the Canadian E! television system. As part of the same transaction, Channel Zero also acquired CJNT Montreal, which it later sold to Rogers Media in 2012.

- Broadcast television stations
- CHCH-DT - Hamilton, Ontario
- Specialty channels
- Rewind
- Silver Screen Classics
- Halla Bol! Kids TV
- Adult content channels
- AOV Adult Movie Channel
- Maleflixxx Television
- XXX Action Clips Channel (also referred to as 'XXX TV') - a Canadian exempt English-language Category B specialty channel. XXX TV is a premium adult entertainment television channel consisting of 5- to 20-minute clips from adult feature films from various adult film genres. It is owned by Channel Zero in conjunction with AOV, which programs and operates the service.

=== Ouat Media ===
Ouat Media, established in 2006, specializes in distribution and worldwide sales of short films.

== Previously owned assets ==
- andPOP - In June 2013, Channel Zero announced that it had acquired a majority interest in ANDPOP Inc., the owners of ANDPOP.com, a pop culture entertainment website, and Chart Attack, a website devoted to independent and alternative music. Both Chart Attack and ANDPOP.com have since been shuttered, while a television series based on andPOP began broadcasting on CHCH-DT on March 22, 2018. The series' show page has since been removed, as of January 2020.
- Bloomberg TV Canada - a business news and information specialty channel established in November 2015. The channel was discontinued in October 2017. After dissolving the partnership with Channel Zero because of poor ratings, Bloomberg went on to partner instead with Bell Media to launch BNN Bloomberg on Canadian television service provider's systems.
- Bollywood Times - a Hindi-language specialty channel that showed Bollywood films encompassing a variety of genres. Originally launched by FDR Media Group, the channel was later operated by Channel Zero at an undisclosed point by 2016. Bollywood Times ceased broadcasting in January 2018.
- CJNT-DT / Metro 14 - On June 30, 2009, Channel Zero acquired CJNT, a Montreal-based operation from Canwest after the latter filed bankruptcy for CJNT. The CRTC approved the sale on August 28, 2009. The station adopted a new schedule featuring a mix of music videos and already existing local ethnic programming during the day, and foreign movies at night, and reverted to branding itself as simply CJNT.
  - On June 14, 2010, Channel Zero announced it would be rebranding CJNT as Metro 14 in the fall, to appeal to a wider urban audience; the "14" represents its cable slot on Vidéotron in the Greater Montreal area. On February 2, 2011 at 6:00 a.m. EST, the station officially rebranded as Metro 14, behind the original announced date of fall 2010. In 2012, Rogers Media announced its acquisition of CJNT from Channel Zero, to convert the station into an owned-and-operated station of Citytv.
- Fight Now TV - An American combat sports specialty channel broadcasting programming related to wrestling, boxing, mixed martial arts, and other combat sports. The channel launched in May 2011 and ceased broadcasting in June 2014.
- Mehndi TV - a Hindi-language specialty channel that broadcast programming aimed at women. Originally launched by FDR Media Group, the channel was later operated by Channel Zero at an undisclosed point by 2016. Mehndi ceased broadcasting in January 2018.
- Movieola - Originally launched on September 1, 2007 as a Category B specialty channel dedicated to short films from various genres including action, comedy, drama. The channel was eventually shuttered on December 1, 2012, replaced by Rewind on television, and relaunched as an online film service. Ultimately, the Moveiola website was shut down months after Rewind's launch.
