= Movieola =

- Movieola logo
- Country: Canada
- Headquarters: Toronto, Ontario, Canada

Ownership
- Owner: Channel Zero; Movieola: Short Film Channel Inc.

History
- Launched: September 7, 2001
- Closed: December 1, 2012

Links
- Website: Movieola

Movieola (which uses the tagline, The Short Film Channel) was a Canadian online-based film service owned by Channel Zero.

Movieola was dedicated to short films from all genres including comedy, drama, animation, and more; with films ranging from 30 seconds to 40 minutes in length.

== History ==
Movieola originally launched on September 7, 2001 as a linear television service on various Canadian cable and satellite television service providers.

In early 2007, Movieola began streaming films through its website free of charge. Also, in 2007, Movieola signed a deal with Joost, agreeing to provide short film content to the online TV service. Movieola would later sign a similar deal with the online service, Hulu.

In November 2011, Movieola's parent company's President and COO, Cal Millar, revealed through an interview with C21 Media that Channel Zero planned to begin offering additional programming to Movieola's schedule, shifting away from airing exclusively short film content citing "short film hasn’t translated as well as we’d have liked it to on TV."

In September 2012, Channel Zero made public its plans to rebrand the television service as Rewind, a film channel devoted to feature-length films from the 1970s through to the 1990s, targeting the Generation X demographic. However, citing the success of Movieola content online through Hulu, the Movieola brand would continue to exist as an online-only service through Hulu in the United States and as an app in Canada.

The television service rebranded as Rewind on December 1, 2012. Its online presence continued to exist on Hulu as a web-channel and on demand service until sometime in 2014/2015. Plans to launch a Canadian app were lated abandoned and its own dedicated website was shut down several months after closure of the channel.

== See also ==
- Condensed Classics with Dave Shaw
