= Patricia Hidalgo Reina =

British television executive

Patricia Hidalgo Reina is a British broadcasting executive and the current Director of BBC Children's and Education.

== Career ==
She began her broadcasting career at Canal+ in Spain. Moving to The Walt Disney Company in 2008, she worked in Spain, Italy, and the UK and was responsible for Disney Channel's content strategy across Europe, the Middle East and Africa (EMEA) and the commissioning and acquisition of children's TV franchises, such as Disney Channel's Violetta, Mediawan and Zag's Miraculous and Hasbro's PJ Masks among others.

In 2013 she was appointed Chief Content and Creative Officer for the Turner network channels across EMEA, overseeing their children's channels which include Cartoon Network, Cartoonito and Boomerang.

== BBC ==
Hidalgo Reina was announced as the 19th director of BBC Children's and Education on 5 May 2020.

Taking over her responsibilities during the COVID-19 epidemic led her to increase the amount of education programming available to children unable to attend school during lockdown. In addition to education provision on the BBC Children's services (CBBC and CBeebies) a commitment was made to make at least two hours of secondary school content each day on BBC 2.

In February 2021 she launched a programme strategy to invest in British animation that might match the cultural impact of The Simpsons. "We should be thinking about these things. Children grow up with these cultures. Why not infuse more of our culture?" she said.

== Awards ==
In 2017 she was awarded the World Screen's Global Kids Trendsetter award at MIPCOM in recognition of her contributions to the children's media industry.

Media offices
Preceded by Alice Webb	Director: BBC Children's Television; May 2020 - present	Succeeded by incumbent
