= One to One: John & Yoko =

2024 documentary film

- Theatrical release poster
- Directed by: Kevin MacDonald; Sam Rice-Edwards
- Produced by: Peter Worsley; Kevin Macdonald; Alice Webb
- Cinematography: David Katznelson
- Edited by: Sam Rice-Edwards
- Production companies: Mercury Studios; Plan B Entertainment; KM Films
- Distributed by: Magnolia Pictures (United States); Dogwoof (International)
- Release dates: August 30, 2024 (Venice); April 9, 2025 (United Kingdom); April 11, 2025 (United States)
- Running time: 100 minutes
- Countries: United Kingdom; United States
- Language: English
- Box office: $832,203

One to One: John & Yoko is a 2024 documentary film co-directed by Kevin Macdonald and Sam Rice-Edwards. The film follows the couple of years which John Lennon and Yoko Ono spent in a Greenwich Village apartment while also tracing developments in American politics like the presidency of Richard Nixon and opposition to United States involvement in the Vietnam War. It is centered around Lennon and Ono's "One to One" benefit concert for the children at Willowbrook. Sean Ono Lennon, son of Lennon and Ono, oversaw audio mastering for the concert footage.

The film was announced on May 29, 2024. It later premiered at the Venice Film Festival on August 30, 2024 and was followed with showings at the Telluride Film Festival and the Sundance Film Festival with distribution by Mercury Studios. On January 21, 2025, Magnolia Pictures announced their acquisition of North American rights for the film, after which they announced an April 11 release date in IMAX theaters, as well as plans for streaming releases later in the year. In the United Kingdom, it would be released in IMAX on April 9, 2025 before also being released to regular cinemas on April 11. It would open in non-IMAX theaters in the United States on April 18, 2025.

== Synopsis ==
The film is centered on concert footage and audio from Lennon and Ono's "One to One" benefit concert held at Madison Square Garden on 30 August 1972 on behalf of children at the Willowbrook institution in Staten Island. The "One to One" benefit concerts were the only full concert performances by Lennon following the Beatles' split in 1970.

The film also follows the trajectory of their 18-month stay in a Greenwich Village apartment from 1971–1973.

== Background ==
The project began when Macdonald was presented with remastered, restored, never-before-seen footage of the "One to One" benefit concert. Macdonald then considered the broader context of why the concert happened, probing further questions about Lennon and Ono's lives and careers.

Macdonald then sought to create a film around the benefit concert, as well as the couple's "political engagement" and their relationship to watching television.

The original release of this concert is the Live in New York City album and home video in 1986.

== Composition ==
Between clips of the "One to One" benefit concert, the film additionally cuts together video and audio recordings from television, phone calls, and other contexts from the same time, highlighting historical events such as Lennon's failed "Free the People" tour and controversies around Ono's relationship to Lennon and The Beatles.

The film also uses "newly transferred and restored footage" from the years which Lennon and Ono spent in Greenwich Village "alongside previously unseen and unheard items from the couple’s personal archives, including phone calls and home movies". It additionally features a replica construction of Lennon and Ono's apartment.

Sean Ono Lennon stated: "Kevin's documentary brings completely fresh insight into my parents' lives during their Bank Street and early New York years, showing first hand their unwavering dedication to promoting peace and non-violence during a turbulent era of unrest, corruption and unnecessary war."

== Critical reception ==
On the review aggregator website Rotten Tomatoes, 90% of 70 critics' reviews are positive. The website's consensus reads: "Unearthing fascinating archival materials to provide newfound insight into one of popular culture's most iconic couples, One to One helps audiences get know John and Yoko better than they could previously imagine." Metacritic, which uses a weighted average, assigned the film a score of 79 out of 100, based on 23 critics, indicating "generally favorable" reviews.

The Guardian gave the film four out of five stars, stating that "I'm not convinced that the world needs another John Lennon film... But Macdonald and Rice-Edwards have managed to find and mine a rich source of material, tightly tucked away amid all the other wildcat wells." The reviewer called it "such a fun, fierce and full-blooded take" on a music documentary that "makes Lennon feel somehow vital again."

The Hollywood Reporter wrote that "Through its kaleidoscopic but very specific lens, the film illuminates a seismic generational shift." The reviewer observed the film's interrogation of optimism, political advocacy, and peace during the consequential historical events of the seventies.

Variety called the film "the most accomplished and arresting of these tightly angled Lennon profiles... The music gives the film shape and propulsion. But so does the way that Macdonald, keying off Lennon’s TV habit, presents images of the period as an ongoing channel-surfing montage." The reviewer called it a "must see."

== Box office ==
As of June 12, 2025, the film has made $832,203 worldwide.
