= Directors of the Royal Botanic Gardens, Kew =

This is a list of directors of the Royal Botanic Gardens, Kew:

- 1759–1793 William Aiton
- 1793–1841 William Townsend Aiton
- 1841–1865 Sir William Jackson Hooker
- 1865–1885 Sir Joseph Dalton Hooker
- 1885–1905 Sir William Turner Thiselton-Dyer
- 1905–1922 Sir David Prain
- 1922–1941 Sir Arthur William Hill
- 1941–1943 Sir Geoffrey Evans (acting)
- 1943–1956 Sir Edward Salisbury
- 1956–1971 Sir George Taylor
- 1971–1976 Jack Heslop-Harrison
- 1976–1981 Professor John Patrick Micklethwait Brenan
- 1981–1988 ProfessorArthur Bell
- 1988–1999 Sir Ghillean Prance
- 1999–2006 Professor Sir Peter Crane
- 2006–2012 Professor Stephen Hopper
- 2012–present Richard Deverell

== See also ==
Curators of the Royal Botanic Gardens, Kew
