= List of directors of BBC Children's =

The Director of BBC Children's and Education is the current name for the editorial head of BBC Children's and Education; the post has had a variety of titles since the department's inception in 1950.

The position is line managed by Kate Phillips, the BBC's Chief Content Officer.

== Remit ==
The director is responsible for all operational and editorial aspects of BBC Children's and Education, including the commissioning and acquisition of all content within the division. They lead the BBC's content strategy for children on BBC iPlayer. As at July 2025, the position is remunerated between £255,000 and £259,999 annually.

== List of directors ==
Post Holder	Name of job title at time of appointment	Tenure
Patricia Hidalgo Reina	Director of BBC Children's and Education	2020–present
Alice Webb	Director of BBC Children's	2015–2020
Kay Benbow	Acting Director of BBC Children's	2014–2015
Joe Godwin	Director of BBC Children's	2009–2014
Richard Deverell	Director of BBC Children's	2006–2009
Alison Sharman	Controller, BBC Children's	2005–2006
Dorothy Prior	Controller, BBC Children's	2003–2005
Nigel Pickard	Controller, BBC Children's	2000–2003
Chris Bellinger	Head of BBC Children's Entertainment	1998–2002
Roy Thompson	Commissioner, BBC Children's	1997–2000
Lorraine Heggessey	Head of Children's Programmes	1997–1999
Anna Home	Head of Children's Programmes	1986–1997
Edward Barnes	Head of Children's Programmes	1978–1986
Monica Sims	Head of Children's Programmes	1967–1978
Doreen Stephens	Head of Family Programmes	1964–1967
Ursula Eason	Acting Head of Children's Programmes	1963–1964
Owen Reed	Head of Children's Programmes	1956–1963
Freda Lingstrom	Head of Children's Programmes	1951–1956
Richmond Postgate	Joint Acting Head of Children's Programmes	1950–1951
Cecil Madden	Joint Acting Head of Children's Programmes	1950–1951
