= Richard Deverell =

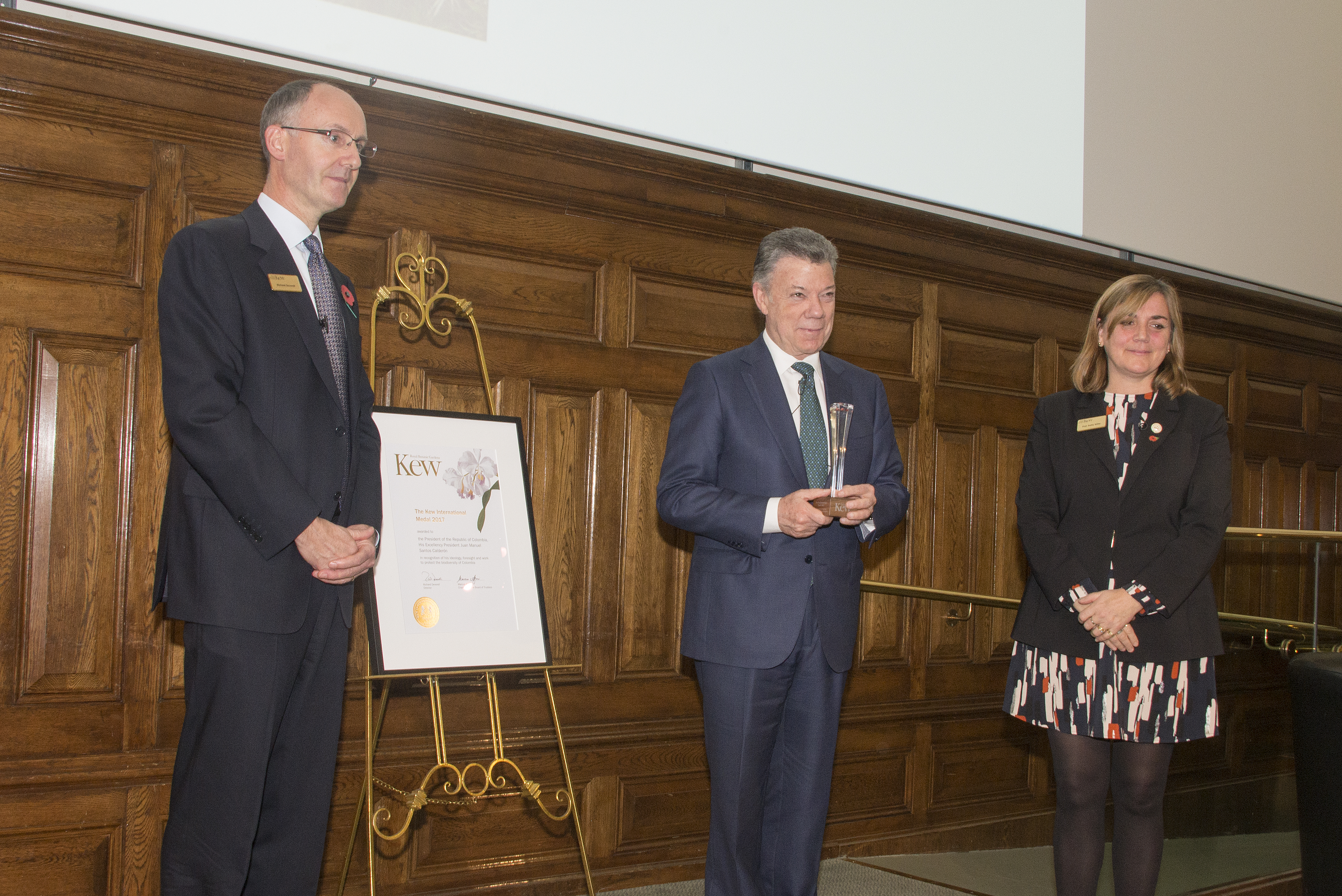

Richard George Deverell CBE (born 1965) became Director of the Royal Botanic Gardens, Kew in September 2012. He was previously Controller of CBBC, the department within the BBC responsible for output aimed at children.

== Early life ==
Deverell was born in 1965. He graduated in biological sciences from Cambridge University.

== Career history ==
After graduation, Deverell worked for several years in management consultancy before joining the BBC, where he was Head of Strategy and Marketing and on the Board of BBC News, as Head of News Interactive.

=== BBC Children's ===
In 2005 he was appointed the chief operating officer of CBBC, the then name for the BBC Children's department, as Alison Sharman's deputy. A year later, in 2006, when Sharman left after just five months in the post, he was appointed into her role as Controller, CBBC. As someone who had come from a management, rather than a programming background, after taking up his post, Deverell created two new Creative Directors of the CBBC and CBeebies services respectively renaming his title, Controller of BBC Children's.

In March 2009, Deverell was named chief operating officer of the BBC's new broadcasting and production centre in Salford Quays which was to become the new base for BBC Children's along with BBC Sport but in 2011 he switched roles to become the BBC's programme director for the W12 project, responsible for the sale of the BBC's property in West London including Television Centre.

=== Kew Gardens Director ===
In 2012, Deverell was appointed the Director of Royal Botanic Gardens, Kew, of which he had been a trustee from 2003 to 2009, during which time his contributions included chairing the Board Audit Committee.

As Director, Deverell became responsible for: the botanic gardens and collections located in London and Wakehurst, Sussex; and a large number of UK and international plant conservation and research projects.

In 2016, he supported the transfer to Kew of the award-winning British-designed structure, The Hive, which was initially commissioned by UK Trade & Investment as the UK Pavilion for the Milan Expo in 2015. The installation aims to raise awareness among visitors of the relationship between plants and pollinators and has received acclaim.

Facing a significant funding shortage in 2014/15 Deverell oversaw a restructure of RBG Kew. In December 2014 he appeared in front of the Science and Technology Select Committee of the House of Commons, to explain the reasons why and to outline the support RBG Kew needed from government and elsewhere. In April 2016 RBG Kew announced a positive 4-year funding settlement from the UK government through DEFRA.

Deverell has also been behind a higher profile for botanical science at RBG Kew since he became Director, with the unveiling of a new Science Strategy in 2015, the launch of the first State of the World's Plants report in 2016, and the first Kew Science Festival in August 2016.

Deverell was appointed Commander of the Order of the British Empire (CBE) in the 2024 New Year Honours for services to botanical science and conservation.

== Personal life ==
Deverell is married with three children.
