= Royal Botanic Gardens, Kew =

Government botanical research institute in the UK

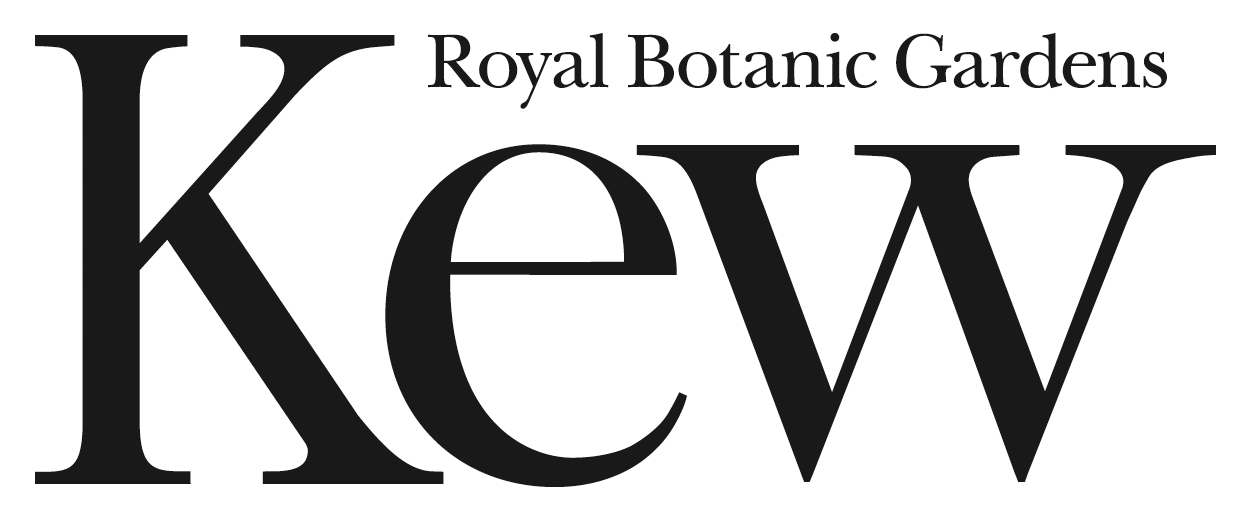
- Type: Non-departmental public body
- Location: Kew, London Borough of Richmond upon Thames
- Key people: Professor Sir Andrew Steer (chair); Richard Deverell (director)
- Budget: £65.6 million
- Employees: 1,100
- Website: www.kew.org

Royal Botanic Gardens, Kew is a non-departmental public body in the United Kingdom sponsored by the Department for Environment, Food and Rural Affairs. An internationally important botanical research and education institution, it employs 1,100 staff. Its board of trustees is chaired by Sir Andrew Steer.

The organisation manages botanic gardens at Kew in Richmond upon Thames in south-west London, and at Wakehurst Place, a National Trust property in Sussex which is home to the internationally important Millennium Seed Bank, whose scientists work with partner organisations in more than 95 countries. Kew, jointly with the Forestry Commission, founded Bedgebury National Pinetum in Kent in 1923, specialising in growing conifers. In 1994, the Castle Howard Arboretum Trust, which runs the Yorkshire Arboretum, was formed as a partnership between Kew and the Castle Howard Estate.

In 2025, the organisation had 2,250,355 public visitors at Kew, and 433,216 at Wakehurst. Its 326-acre (132 ha) site at Kew has 40 historically important buildings; it became a UNESCO World Heritage Site in 2003. The collections at Kew and Wakehurst include over 27,000 taxa of living plants, 8.3 million plant and fungal herbarium specimens and over 2.4 billion seeds collected from nearly 40,000 species in the Millennium Seed Bank.

== Mission ==
The Royal Botanic Gardens, Kew states that its mission is to apply scientific discovery and research to fully develop the information about and potential uses of plants and fungi.

A conference held in 1976 by the Royal Botanic Gardens, Kew was important as it established a co-ordinating body in order to determine which threatened plants are in cultivation and where they are located which played a role in plant conservation.

== Governance ==
Kew is governed by a board of trustees which comprises a chairman and eleven members. Ten members and the chairman are appointed by the Secretary of State for Environment, Food and Rural Affairs. The monarch appoints their own trustee on the recommendation of the secretary of state.

As of August 2026, the board members are:

- Professor Sir Andrew Steer (chair)
- Steve Almond
- Judith Batchelar
- Fay Cooke
- Professor Christopher Gilligan (HM The King's Trustee)
- Professor Ian Graham
- Sarah Greasley
- Dame Dervilla Mitchell
- Sir Paul Nurse
- Dr Fiona Pathiraja
- Kate Priestman
- David Richardson
- Professor Dame Angela McLean (Independent Board Member)

== Kew Science ==
=== Scientific staff ===
More than 470 scientists work for the Royal Botanic Gardens, Kew. The executive director of science is Alexandre Antonelli. The directors are Elizabeth Gardner, Paul Kersey and Alan Paton.

Kew Science staff include those of the Kew Madagascar Conservation Centre.

=== Databases ===
The scientific staff at Kew maintain a variety of plant and fungal data and digital resources, including those listed below.

==== Plants of the World Online ====
Plants of the World Online is an online database launched in March 2017 as one of nine strategic outputs with the ultimate aim being "to enable users to access information on all the world's known seed-bearing plants by 2020". It links taxonomic data with images from the collection, to provide a single point of access with information on identification, distribution, traits, conservation, molecular phylogenies and uses.

==== International Plant Names Index ====
The International Plant Names Index (IPNI) includes information from the Index Kewensis, a project which began in the 19th century to provide an "Index to the Names and Authorities of all known flowering plants and their countries". The Harvard University Herbaria and the Australian National Herbarium co-operate with Kew in the IPNI database, which was launched in its present form in 1999 to produce an authoritative source of information on botanical nomenclature including publication details of seed plants, ferns and lycophytes. It is a nomenclatural listing of all published taxonomic plant names including new species, new combinations and new names at rank of botanical family down to infraspecific. It provides data for other related projects including Tropicos and the Global Biodiversity Information Facility (GBIF).

==== Neotropikey ====
Neotropikey is an international project, based at Kew Gardens, on the flowering plants of the Neotropics (tropical South and Central America).

==== World Checklist of Selected Plant Families ====
The World Checklist of Selected Plant Families (WCSP) is a register of accepted scientific names and synonyms of 200 selected seed plant families. WCSP is widely used, and most authoritative web resources on plants use it as their basis.

==== World Checklist of Vascular Plants ====
The World Checklist of Vascular Plants (WCVP) includes all known vascular plant species (flowering plants, conifers, ferns, clubmosses, and firmosses). It is derived from the WCSP and the IPNI and therefore only includes names found in those databases. It is the taxonomic database for Plants of the World Online. Since WCSP includes only selected families, WCVP will seek to complete the process.

==== World Checklist of Useful Plant Species ====
The World Checklist of Useful Plant Species lists 40,292 species, including nine non-plant taxa (e.g. nostoc, forkweed, brown algae), compiled from multiple pre-existing datasets.

=== Collaborative projects ===
==== The Plant List and World Flora Online ====
Kew also cooperated with the Missouri Botanical Garden and other international bodies in The Plant List (TPL). Unlike the IPNI, it provided information on which names are currently accepted. The Plant List was an Internet encyclopedia project which was launched in 2010 to compile a comprehensive list of botanical nomenclature. The Plant List had records for 1,064,035 scientific names for plant species, representing 350,699 accepted plant species. In addition, the list had records for 642 plant families and 17,020 plant genera. It was last updated in 2013, and was superseded by World Flora Online, which was developed as its successor in 2012, aiming to include all known plants by 2020.

== See also ==
- The two main sites of Royal Botanic Gardens, Kew:
  - Kew Gardens
  - Wakehurst, West Sussex
- Botanists active at Kew Gardens
- Curtis's Botanical Magazine, an illustrated publication which began in 1787 and is published by Wiley-Blackwell for the Royal Botanic Gardens, Kew
- Directors of the Royal Botanic Gardens, Kew
- Curators of the Royal Botanic Gardens, Kew
- GrassBase, a web-based database of grasses, continually maintained and updated by Royal Botanic Gardens, Kew
- The Great Plant Hunt, a primary school science initiative created by Kew Gardens, commissioned and funded by the Wellcome Trust
- Joseph Dalton Hooker, who succeeded his father, William Jackson Hooker, as director in 1865
- The Journal of the Kew Guild - digitized issues of the journal by members of staff since 1893.
- Index Kewensis, a massive index of plant names started and maintained by Royal Botanic Gardens, Kew
- Kew Bulletin, a peer-reviewed scientific journal published by Springer Science+Business Media on behalf of the Royal Botanic Gardens, Kew
- Kew Gardens (Leases) Act 2019, an Act of Parliament relating to the Gardens
- Kew Herbarium
- Kew International Medal
- Kew Madagascar Conservation Centre
- Tropical Important Plant Areas, a programme in collaboration with Plantlife International to identify and protect important plant diversity in tropical countries

== Sources ==
- "Royal Botanic Gardens Kew annual report and accounts". GOV.UK.
