= Alison Sharman =

British television executive

Alison Sharman (born in Manchester) is an Executive and Teams Coach and was formerly a Television Executive, working her way from junior grades to hold posts including Controller of BBC Daytime and Controller of BBC Children's.

== Career history ==
She began her broadcasting career as a production secretary on the BBC consumer television programme Watchdog and, after a variety of assignments on various features output including series producer on the flagship BBC1 Holiday programme, she became Editor of Development, BBC Daytime.

=== BBC Daytime ===
In 2002 Sharman became the Controller of BBC Daytime, managing the output of BBC1 and BBC2 across the day. She commissioned programmes including MasterChef, Bargain Hunt, Homes Under the Hammer, Eggheads, Saturday Kitchen, Strictly Come Dancing: It Takes Two and The Weakest Link.

=== BBC Children's ===
In 2005 she was appointed Controller, CBBC, the then name for the BBC Children's department.

She launched her strategy at the Children's Media Conference in Sheffield in July 2005. "Above all," she said, "we must always keep a respectful focus upon two of the core needs of children: first, the need to understand and express something of their deep inner world. And secondly, the need to understand their place in—and relationship to—the outer world, from their immediate family to the wider society."

She recommissioned Jackanory after a 12-year break and commissioned the children's docudrama That Summer Day. Other successful programming under her included Horrible Histories, The Sarah Jane Adventures and In the Night Garden...,

In addition, Sharman was the Advisory Chair of the Media Guardian Edinburgh International Television Festival in 2006.

=== ITV ===
After five months as Controller, CBBC, Sharman left the BBC to become ITV’s Director of Factual and Daytime in 2006. Here, she commissioned a range of content, fronted by personalities such as Billy Connolly and Joanna Lumley, brought to the channel popular formats such as For the Love of Dogs and Long Lost Family as well as the landmark documentaries 9/11: The Day That Changed the World, Strangeways and Our Queen. She also began the Trevor McDonald hard-hitting documentary franchise with Inside Death Row with Trevor McDonald. Her ITV daytime credits include The Chase, Tipping Point and Dickinson's Real Deal.

In 2007 Sharman was considered a candidate for the next Controller of BBC1. She ruled herself out. The Guardian reported that she had wanted the role in 2005 and that she had been given the Controller of CBBC post as a consolation prize.

=== Australia ===
Sharman was the Head of Commissioning for the Special Broadcasting Service (SBS), based in Sydney, Australia from 2013 to 2016. During this time Sharman commissioned a range of scripted and non-scripted content including Logie winning drama The Principal, comedy drama The Family Law, drama documentary Deep Water, documentary series First Contact and a range of food related content including Rachel Khoo’s Kitchen Notebook: Melbourne and Made in Italy with Silvia Colloca. Sharman's passion for food ensured she was included in the Sydney Morning Herald Kitchen Spy feature.

=== Current ===
Sharman returned to the UK in 2016. She works as a self-employed Executive & Team Coach with a portfolio of coaching, talent and content roles. This has included consultancy for Thoroughly Modern Media the independent that produced Heston's Dinner in Space and Inside Heston’s World for SBS Australia. On her appointment, Sharman said "I am privileged to have been a commissioner for the BBC, ITV and SBS Australia, and for some time now I’ve been wanting to try something new and exciting in a more hands on creative role."
