= The Great Plant Hunt =

Educational initiative

The Great Plant Hunt is a primary school plant science learning initiative, developed by the Royal Botanic Gardens, Kew, and funded by the Wellcome Trust. It is supported by DEFRA, Sir David Attenborough, and Science Learning Centres in the UK.

Primary science resources kit boxes or 'Treasure Chests', developed by Kew, were sent to every maintained primary school in the UK in Spring 2009. The boxes' contents – teaching materials and seed processing equipment – support teaching of the primary science curriculum for every year group from 5–11. The resources enable children to experience the variation and adaptation characteristics of plants. UK children will also be invited to contribute seed to Kew’s Millennium Seed Bank, supporting their research and conservation work.

All activities are linked to the National Curriculum for Key Stages 1 and 2, with a focus on the science curriculum, but also offering cross-curricular opportunities.

Forming part of the Darwin 200 initiative, the Great Plant Hunt encourages primary school children to "follow in the footsteps" of Charles Darwin by going on nature walks in and around their school grounds. The aim is that children find out more about plants, think about the roles plants play in people's lives, and in the process learn key scientific skills.

Schools do not need green space to participate in the project; local parks, churchyards, and playgrounds can be used. Many of the activities are completely classroom-based and will be supported with online resources including video and music. Engagement may involve the whole school or just one class.

It was relaunched as a European project in 2015 using the resources previously developed by Kew but with different funders.
