= Tropical Important Plant Areas =

Royal Botanic Gardens programme to preserve tropical plant diversity

Tropical Important Plant Areas (TIPAs) is a programme established by the Royal Botanic Gardens, Kew in 2015 in collaboration with Plantlife International, to provide a framework to identify sites important for preserving plant diversity in tropical countries. The programme is based on the Important Plant Areas (IPA)s framework set up by Plantlife International. The IPA criteria were modified to take into account the high plant richness, the limited availability of data and the higher dependence on socio-economically important yet native plants for livelihoods in the tropics. The framework acknowledges the practical problems of gathering plant and habitat data in many regions of the world, and it recognises the important role of peer-reviewed expert opinion in the selection process. TIPAs can be identified based on a range of organism groups within the plant and fungal kingdoms, including algae, fungi, lichens, liverworts, mosses, and wild vascular plants. The TIPAs programme focuses on critical sites for wild plant populations. It aims to identify areas important for the conservation of threatened plants and/or habitats and areas with exceptional plant richness, and to raise awareness of the importance of plant life in tropical countries, encouraging long term conservation of these areas. TIPA sites are selected based on three criteria:

A. Presence of threatened plant species: the site holds significant populations of one or more species that are of global or regional conservation concern.

B. Presence of high botanical richness: the site has an exceptionally rich flora in relation to a particular vegetation type, and/ or contains an exceptional number of species of conservation importance and/or an exceptional number of socially, economically or culturally valuable plant species.

C. Presence of threatened habitats: the site is an outstanding example of a habitat or vegetation type of global, regional or national conservation and botanical importance.

TIPAs are designed to aid national plant and habitat conservation planning through a practical and pragmatic approach. A TIPA is not a legal designation and can be an unprotected site or a site wholly or partially within an existing protected area. TIPAs do not consider land ownership regime and can be of varying size. The first phase of the Kew TIPA programme runs from 2015 to 2020 and involves partnerships in seven tropical countries: Bolivia, Cameroon, Guinea, Mozambique, Indonesian New Guinea, Uganda, and the British Virgin Islands.

== Bolivia ==
The Bolivian TIPA programme is a collaboration between the Royal Botanic Gardens, Kew, the Museo História Natural Noel Kempff Mercado (MHNNKM) and Fundación Amigos de la Naturaleza (FAN), both in Santa Cruz. The programme was launched in 2016 with funds from the Eva-Langley Metcalf Trust, and has since received funding form the Darwin Initiative and William Cadbury Trust to support the implementation of the TIPA sites and building sustainable livelihoods in local communities. The Chiquitania dry forest and savanna ecoregion, located in the eastern lowlands of the department of Santa Cruz, was initially selected as the project focus due to the rapidly increasing rate of forest destruction. The partnerships involves 1) joint field expeditions, global IUCN Red List assessments of 200 Chiquitania endemic plant species; 2) building Bolivian capacity in seed banking and IUCN Red List assessment and TIPA methodology; and 3) TIPA site assessments which are underway to be completed in 2020 in 20 potential sites, including the Serranía de Chiquitos, inselberg archipelago of Lomerío, San Matias AMNI and the Noel Kempff Mercado National Park.

== Cameroon ==
The Cameroon TIPA programme builds on a partnership of nearly 30 years with the National Herbarium of Cameroon at the Institute of Research in Agronomic Development (IRAD) and the University of Yaoundé. From the early 1990s onwards, numerous expeditions have been undertaken to botanically diverse areas including the Cameroon Highlands. Seven conservation checklists for plants of different areas have been produced to date (the first for Mount Cameroon in 1998) resulting in three new protected areas for plants being recognised by the Government of Cameroon. A Red Data Book of Plants, recognising 815 globally threatened plant species for Cameroon, the first such publication for a tropical African country. The Cameroon TIPA project will work to ensure the long-term survival and sustainable use of Cameroon's endemic, threatened and socio-economically important plant species through national and community engagement and support for protection.

== Guinea ==
Guinea TIPAs launched in 2016 with funding from the Darwin Initiative. This is a collaboration between the Royal Botanic Gardens Kew, National Herbarium of Guinea[13], the Guinean Government and NGO Guinée Ecologie. Through this partnership, 22 Tropical Important Plant Areas have been documented and published, over 200 IUCN Red List assessments have been compiled and a Preliminary List of over 270 threatened plant species has been published, including 74 endemic species. The Government of Guinea has given their support to include the 22 TIPAs into the National Parks and Reserves network and legislation, some of which are likely to become National Parks e.g. Kounounkan Massif and the Moyen Bafing proposed National Park. The programme partners are now advising the Government of Guinea on the formal protection and management of these sites.

== Mozambique ==
The Mozambique TIPAs programme launched in 2017 through a collaboration between Royal Botanic Gardens, Kew, Mozambique's Agricultural Research Institute (IIAM) and Eduardo Mondlane University. Key outputs to date include a published list of Mozambique's endemic plants and IUCN Red Listassessments for over 300 of these priority plant species. Mozambique's Important Plant Area assessments are underway, including critical sites such as the Chimanimani Mountains and Lowlands, Mount Namuli and the Ribaue Massif.

== Indonesian New Guinea ==
The tropical island of New Guinea has a relatively large amount of intact habitats remaining and has been designated as one of the three remaining tropical wilderness areas by Conservation International. The Royal Botanic Gardens, Kew has a long partnership with in-country partners, Universitas Papua; together they will identify TIPAs in Indonesian New Guinea with an emphasis on the Bird's Head peninsula (the Vogelkop) in West Papua Province. This project will include training in identification, Red Listing, seed banking and aims to produce a database of plant specimens from the islands and guides for identification.

== The British Virgin Islands ==
The Royal Botanic Gardens, Kew, the National Parks Trust of the Virgin Islands (NPTVI) and the Government of the Virgin Islands Ministry of Natural Resources, Labour and Immigration joined forces in a collaborative project (2017–2019) in the British Virgin Islands (BVI) to map and assess threatened plants, identify and map TIPAs and engage the community through workshops, interpretation panels and a field guide on the important plants of the BVI. The British Virgin Islands was the first country to have its TIPAs network identified in April 2018 with a total of 18 TIPAs across 13 islands of the archipelago. Data on the BVI threatened plant species and habitats generated during the TIPAs process is helping to inform environmental policy and species management in the BVI.
