= Parkes High School =

Location
- Parkes, Central West, New South Wales; Australia
- Coordinates: 33°8′20″S 148°10′50″E

Information
- Type: Government-funded co-educational comprehensive secondary day school
- Motto: Latin: Dum Vivo Disco (While I live, I learn)
- Established: 1933; 93 years ago
- School district: Mitchell; Rural South and West
- Educational authority: NSW Department of Education
- Principal: Sandra Carter
- Years: 7–12
- Enrolment: ~580 (2018)
- Campus type: Regional
- Website: parkes-h.schools.nsw.gov.au

Parkes High School is a government-funded co-educational comprehensive secondary day school, located in Parkes, in the Central West region of New South Wales, Australia. It is a part of the Henry Parkes Learning Community.

Established in 1933, the school enrolled approximately 580 students in 2018, from Year 7 to Year 12, of whom 15 per cent identify as Indigenous Australians and 3 per cent from a language background other than English. The school is operated by the NSW Department of Education; the principal is Sandra Carter.

The school offers a range of subjects in junior (7 to 10) and senior years (11 to 12) in accordance with a syllabus developed by the New South Wales Education Standards Authority.

== Senior courses ==
At Parkes High School there are numerous courses available to senior students as they work toward attaining their NSW Higher School Certificate (HSC).

=== English ===
English is a required unit of study in NSW and as such all students must complete one of these English courses: Advanced English, which may be completed with HSC Extension 1 English; Standard English, which are Board Developed ATAR accredited courses; and English Studies, which is a Board Endorsed Course.

=== Maths ===
Mathematics is a very popular unit of study at Parkes High School. The courses offered by the Maths Faculty at Parkes High are: General Maths; Mathematics, which can be completed with HSC Mathematics 1; and HSC Mathematics 2 in year 12. All Mathematics courses are Board Developed and ATAR accredited courses.

=== Science ===
Science is a choice made by many students wishing to go into a field which utilises that specialised knowledge. Courses offered by the Science Faculty at Parkes High are Physics, Chemistry, Earth and Environmental Science, Biology and Investigating Science. These are Board Developed and ATAR accredited courses.

=== HSIE ===
The HSIE (Human Society in Its Environment) Faculty offer a wide variety of courses available to senior students of Parkes High. Due to their variety, these are very popular. The subjects offered by the HSIE Faculty are Geography, Ancient History, and Modern History. A student can complete HSC Extension History if completing one of the histories. Business Studies is a very popular subject due to the Cert II in Retail, Aboriginal Studies. These are all Board Developed courses and ATAR accredited.

=== VET ===
VET (Vocational Education Training) is a widely selected area of study. VET courses offered at Parkes High School include Industrial Technology – Metal and Timber, Automotive, and Hospitality.

== Aboriginal studies ==
The school has an emphasis on the teaching of Aboriginal studies wherein students focus on issues relating to Indigenous Australians. Wiradjuri, the indigenous language of the Aboriginal people of the same name who inhabited and continue to inhabit the area, is taught in year 7 at the school in conjunction with the local Aboriginal community. Parkes High School in a leadership role with other high schools and primary schools in the area continues to develop curriculum and resources for the teaching of Wiradjuri and Aboriginal languages generally.

== Notable alumni ==
- Michael Carrington – international television executive
- Dianna Corcoran – country music artist
- Phil Emmanuel – guitarist
- Tommy Emmanuel – guitarist
- David Nash – linguist
