= CBeebies =

British children's television network

- Logo used since 2023
- Country: United Kingdom
- Broadcast area: United Kingdom; Ireland; Poland; Turkey; MENA; India; Sub-Saharan Africa; Asia; New Zealand; Pakistan
- Network: BBC One; BBC Two; BBC Alba (in Scottish Gaelic only)
- Headquarters: MediaCityUK, Salford, England

Programming
- Language: English
- Picture format: 1080i/1080p (Note: 1080p25 sometimes only on Freeview) HDTV

Ownership
- Owner: BBC; BBC Studios (international network)
- Sister channels: UK: BBC One; BBC Two; BBC Three; BBC Four; BBC News; BBC Parliament; CBBC; BBC Scotland; BBC Alba; International: BBC News (international); BBC UKTV; BBC Brit; BBC HD; BBC Lifestyle; BBC Earth; BBC Entertainment; BBC Kids; BBC First

History
- Launched: 11 February 2002; 24 years ago
- Replaced: CBBC Choice (demerged with CBBC, originally children's block on BBC Choice)

Links
- Website: cbeebies.com https://www.bbc.co.uk/cbeebies (uk only)

Availability

Terrestrial
- Freeview (UK): Channel 202 (SD); Channel 204 (HD)

Streaming media
- BBC iPlayer: Watch live (UK only)

CBeebies is a British free-to-air public broadcast children's television channel owned and operated by the BBC. It is also the brand used for all BBC content targeted for children aged five years and under. Its sister channel, CBBC, is intended for older children aged six to twelve. It broadcasts every day from 6:00 am to 7:00 pm, timesharing with BBC Four.

== History ==
The channel was first suggested in early 2001 as part of a review of the BBC's children's portfolio; the channel's tentative name was BBC Playbox and had a 76% target for UK-produced content. On 20 November 2001, the CBeebies name was announced as part of the split of the already-existing CBBC block and would be used as both a children's block and a digital channel.

The CBeebies channel launched on 11 February 2002 alongside the CBBC channel, as a spinoff from the BBC's children's television block. The first four shows to air on the channel were Teletubbies, Binka, Step Inside and Bits and Bobs. CBeebies domestically broadcasts from 5:30 am to 7:00 pm, broadcasting seven days per week. From the launch of the channel until 1 March 2002, CBeebies timeshared with fellow BBC channel BBC Knowledge but since 2 March 2002, it has timeshared with BBC Four, which is on air after CBeebies closes for the night at 7:00 pm.

CBeebies was joined on 19 March 2007 by its own radio station titled CBeebies Radio, which broadcast for three hours each day on BBC Radio 7 (now BBC Radio 4 Extra) until April 2011. CBeebies Radio, however, has continued as a feature on CBeebies' website since 2013, and as a station on BBC Sounds broadcasting from 6:00 am to 10:00 pm. A CBeebies Weekly magazine, later CBeebies Magazine, was first published in 2006.

Since March 2013, CBeebies has been carried by the British Forces Broadcasting Service. CBeebies is also available in Ireland.

In September 2018 as part of a branding strategy, BBC Alba's unbranded two-hour children's block was split into CBeebies Alba and CBBC Alba, with the former airing during the first hour and the latter airing during the second hour. This block features its own presentation, presenters and shows in Scottish Gaelic. The only presenter shared between the CBeebies Alba block and CBeebies channel is Dodge T. Dog, who appears on an occasional basis.

On 15 March 2023, CBeebies rebranded its channel identity, in line with a wider corporate rebranding across the BBC starting in 2021. This was CBeebies' first rebrand, and the logo that the channel had used since its launch 21 years earlier was discontinued. The new style featured a new logo in line with the BBC's 2021 logo, as well as a revamped appearance of the "Bugbie" characters that had been part of the channel's identity since launch.

== International and non-English versions ==
Logo used from 11 February 2002 to 14 March 2023, still used on feeds outside the UK, such as in Asia. It is also used as a secondary logo.

BBC Studios owns and operates the international CBeebies feeds, with most of them operating on a 24-hour schedule (compared to the UK version).

=== Africa ===
Sub-Saharan Africa (2008-)

A Sub-Saharan African feed of CBeebies launched in late 2008.

=== Asia ===
India (2007-2012, 2020-)

The first international launch for the CBeebies channel was in India in May 2007, although the channel was shut down at the end of November 2012, due to "commercial considerations". In July 2020, it was relaunched in India, but with the pan-Asian feed in English audio track only.

Japan (2015-2017)

In April 2015, BBC Worldwide signed with South Korean broadcaster KBS and Japanese broadcaster Kids Station to launch CBeebies blocks on both channels. The block shut down in 2017.

Middle East and North Africa (2016-)

In April 2016, a channel for the Middle East and North Africa region was launched.

Southeast Asia (2008-) (Note: East and Southeast Asia (2008-), Philippines (2011-2019), Taiwan (2017-), India (2020-))

A Southeast Asian feed of CBeebies launched in late 2008. On 3 January 2011, CBeebies was launched in the Philippines on Sky Cable. The Philippine feed was replaced with the Southeast Asian feed on 10 March 2017.

On 10 March 2017, CBeebies Asia was launched in Taiwan, replacing BBC Entertainment.

On 1 April 2019, the Southeast Asian feed of CBeebies was removed from Sky Cable. In March 2020, CBeebies launched on Vietnam's television provider Msky. In July 2020, the Southeast Asian feed was launched on Tata Sky in India.

On 15 December 2022, the Asian feed of CBeebies was launched as a preview channel on Astro, which replaced Boomerang on 1 February 2023. The channel later closed on 1 May 2026.

South Korea (2014-)

In January 2014, CBeebies launched an SVOD service on KT olleh TV in South Korea.

In April 2015, BBC Worldwide signed with South Korean broadcaster KBS and Japanese broadcaster Kids Station to launch CBeebies blocks on both channels. The blocks have since closed.

Turkey (2018-)

On 5 April 2018, a feed was launched on Digiturk in Turkey.

=== Europe ===
Poland (2008-)

A Polish feed of CBeebies launched in late 2008. A planned rebrand for the Polish version of CBeebies was initially cancelled in March 2024, after the departure of presenter Aneta Piotrowska. The channel would eventually rebrand on 10 April 2026.

=== North America ===
Canada (2011-2018)

On 13 May 2011, CBeebies was launched as a programme block on the channel BBC Kids in Canada, available on weekdays between 9:00 am and 3:00 pm. It served a similar schedule to the main channel. The block closed alongside its main channel on 31 December 2018, with some programmes moving to Knowledge Kids.

United States (2011-2020)

In March 2011, an on demand version of the network was launched in the United States and became available on Xfinity. On 31 October 2020, CBeebies and CBeebies en Español were removed from all cable and satellite providers in the United States.

=== Oceania ===
Australia and New Zealand (2008-) (Note: Australia (2008-2024), New Zealand (2019-))

The Australian feed of CBeebies was launched in late 2008 on Foxtel. In 2016, it was added to Pluto TV. On 1 December 2019, the Australian feed launched in New Zealand on Sky. In 2024, it was announced that CBeebies would be removed from Foxtel on 31 July, alongside BBC First, BBC Earth, BBC News, and A&E. However, three months after the Foxtel shutdown, CBeebies and BBC Kids were removed from Fetch TV on 31 October 2024.

=== South America ===
Latin America (2008-2017)

A localised Latin American feed of CBeebies launched in late 2008 on Sky Brasil. On 13 April 2017, the localised CBeebies feed for Latin America closed along with BBC Earth and BBC Entertainment.

== Management ==
In the UK, CBeebies is operated by the BBC Children's and Education division and part of BBC North. The division is also responsible for CBBC and overall strategic responsibility for all of the BBC's domestic services for children is provided by the Director of Children's and Education, Patricia Hidalgo Reina (since 2020). The direction of the domestic CBeebies channel was previously occupied by the controller of the channel, Kay Benbow, who commissioned all CBeebies content across BBC television, online, interactive television and radio. The first controller to hold the direction was Michael Carrington, who served until 2010. In 2017, it was announced that the CBeebies controller post would close in December 2017, and all content for the CBeebies brand would be commissioned by a new, pan BBC Children's role entitled Head of Content. In January 2021, it was announced that the decision would be reversed, and a new Head of Commissioning and Acquisitions for preschoolers (0–6) would be appointed.

Internationally, CBeebies is owned by BBC Studios, which operate the brand.

== Presentation ==
The links between programmes on CBeebies are primarily achieved through the use of in-vision continuity, using presenters to interact with the children. In the UK, links are recorded rather than broadcast live, as is the case on sister channel CBBC. They were originally recorded from studio TC0 at BBC Television Centre in London, but moved out in 2008 to Teddington Studios, and returned briefly in 2010. Since September 2011, the links have been based at the BBC's northern base at studios HQ5 and HQ6 in Dock10 studios at MediaCityUK following the move of the BBC Children's department there.

Along with the rest of the BBC's channels, the channel does not air advertisements and programmes are occasionally interrupted by trailers for new shows or new seasons of shows or events.

=== Logo and identities ===
Former logo used from 2021-2023 with the 2021 BBC logo. This logo is still used as a secondary logo today.

CBeebies uses many identities throughout the day during the breaks in between shows. Most of these idents feature the mascots, named the Bugs, also known as the Bugbies. The Bugbies are yellow blobs with faces, and are similar to the ones used by CBBC between 2002 and 2005, with the only difference being the colour: green for CBBC and yellow for CBeebies with both using purple as a similarity. Most idents before the late 2010s feature children saying the channel name twice once the logo appears except the Bedtime idents. The idents have used a moving blobby, slimy-like background or rounded shapes in any colour. Each block has its own ident, and the Bedtime Hour has a few different idents. In 2016, new idents were made for each block, replacing the old ones and the slimy moving background idents were rarely shown. Idents featuring the CBeebies House with it changing to effect the current season have been used from 2016 to 2023.

On 15 March 2023, CBeebies underwent a rebranding by Blue Zoo to fully-adopt the BBC's new corporate branding, with the Bugs reimagined in a rounded square-shaped form to evoke the BBC logo, and a new suite of idents and animated scenes incorporating two- and three-dimensional elements.

== Presenters ==
On-air presenters have been on CBeebies since the channel's launch. They are used to fill the gaps between the shows that air on the channel, speaking directly to the child, doing certain activities such as arts and crafts, leading activities based on a topic from the website, showing viewers' birthday cards, and introducing the shows, well as hosting some of the shows. Many of the presenters have histories as characters in other services or on children's programmes.

=== International Presenters ===
The international variants feature different personalities per broadcast region.

- The Australian feed is the only non-UK service to feature more than one presenter, as this feed features three presenters. Tara Colegrave has presented since the channel's launch in 2008 and when the continuity links moved from the UK to Australia, she was joined by Robbie Harding and Duncan Fellows in 2011.
- The Asian feed shown in countries like Thailand, Hong Kong and Singapore has Nisha Anil as the main presenter.
- The Latin American feed variant had Roser Cabañas as the presenter.
- The Polish channel had Aneta Piotrowska as main presenter from its launch in 2008 until 2024. On some occasions between November 2014 to 2016, Piotrowska appeared on the UK channel.
- The South African feed uses former UK presenter Sidney Sloane. Cat Sandion also presented on this feed before becoming a presenter on the UK version.
- The CBeebies Alba block on BBC Alba uses Bard Cornark, Ben Cajee and Carrie Macneil as the presenters.
- The Turkish feed uses the UK presenters (such as Cat Sandion and George Webster) dubbed over with Turkish voice actors.

== CBeebies Bedtime Stories ==
The final scheduled show on CBeebies each day before the channel goes off air at 19:00 is CBeebies Bedtime Stories (or Stòiridh in Scottish Gaelic, airing on BBC Alba), in which a short picture book for preschool children is read by a guest storyteller. In recent years, the show has featured prominent actors, musicians, comedians, sportspeople and former presenters of BBC children's television, including Tom Hardy, Harry Styles, Billie Eilish, Idris Elba, Kylie Minogue, Lewis Hamilton, Olivia Colman, Steve Carell, Kate Winslet, Ryan Reynolds, Paloma Faith, Jonathan Bailey, Jade Thirlwall, Pedro Pascal, Jack Black, and Tom Holland.

The series is notable for being inclusive, including a story read in British Sign Language by Rose Ayling-Ellis, a story read using Braille by Paralympic athlete Lora Fachie, and a story read by Ed Sheeran on the topic of his childhood stammer.

== CBeebies HD ==
CBeebies HD logo (2013–2023)

The channel launched on 10 December 2013, though it was launched throughout multiple providers nationwide until June 2014 (as did BBC News HD, CBBC HD and BBC Four HD). The channel broadcasts on a commercially operated HD multiplex on Freeview, with limited geographic coverage compared with other multiplexes, and shares its stream with BBC Four HD as they air at different times. Prior to launch, the majority of CBeebies' HD output was broadcast on BBC HD before its closure on 26 March 2013. CBeebies HD was temporarily removed from Freeview as well as BBC Four HD in June 2022, since the COM7 multiplex closed, and the two channels were on COM7, but they were readded in September 2022.

== Other ventures ==
=== CBeebies website ===
The CBeebies website coincided with the launch of the UK channel on 11 February 2002 and showcases a child friendly site with activities themed to various CBeebies programmes, past and present, with games, songs and print-outs featuring for nearly all the shows. The United Kingdom version also features links to CBeebies iPlayer, a child friendly version of the BBC iPlayer site or app featuring CBeebies programmes only, to CBeebies radio player and a dedicated micro site containing advice for raising children and toddlers called CBeebies Grown-ups, which was relaunched in 2011.

The international channels and associated websites are run by BBC Studios. As a result, not all of them are the same and some channels have less extensive websites than other services. CBeebies channels in Asia, Australia, Poland, South Africa and the USA all have their own international variant.

=== VHS and DVD releases ===
BBC Video (and later 2Entertain) released several VHS/DVD compilations featuring shows airing on CBeebies at the time. From 2014 to 2017, Abbey Home Media released the compilations.

VHS or DVD title	Release date	Programmes and Episodes
CBeebies: The Best of Pre-School Television	28 October 2002	Fimbles: "Tambourine", Tweenies: "Invitations", Bill and Ben: "Around and Around", Andy Pandy: "A Noisy Supper", Teletubbies Everywhere: "Ice Skating (Finland)"
Playtime: Introducing Tikkabilla	4 October 2004	Tikkabilla in a 45-minute special, Bill and Ben: "Go Fly a Kite/A Piece of Sky", Tweenies: "Champions", Yoho Ahoy: "Pancake with Poop/Paint with Booty", Little Robots: "A Bit of Give and Take/By Myself", Andy Pandy: "Rub-A-Dub/Potato Prints" Note: This VHS/DVD also has the Andy Pandy song "Honey" in it, which comes after "Rub-A-Dub".
CBeebies: The Ultimate Party Collection	16 April 2007	Big Cook Little Cook: "Postman", Bobinogs: "Happy Bobi-Birthday", The Roly Mo Show: "Little Bo's Birthday", Higgledy House: "Birthday", Charlie and Lola: "This is Actually My Party", Tweenies: "Fizz's Birthday", Balamory: "The Lost Letter", The Koala Brothers: "Penny's Birthday Surprise", Fimbles: "Party Hat", Lunar Jim: "Jim's Birthday Surprise", LazyTown: "Miss Roberta", Me Too: "The Disco Taxi"
CBeebies: The Ultimate Summer Collection	16 July 2007	Balamory: "Beach Bonanza", Fimbles: "Seashell", Boogie Beebies: "Dancing on the Sand", The Koala Brothers: "Lolly's New Flavour", Tweenies: "Summer", Me Too: "The Juicer", Little Robots: "Under the Stars", Higgledy House: "Holiday", The Roly Mo Show: "Too Hot", Big Cook Little Cook: "Holiday Maker", Charlie and Lola: "The Most Wonderfullest Picnic in the Whole Wide World"
CBeebies: The Ultimate Christmas Collection	12 November 2007	LazyTown: "Surprise Santa", Boogie Beebies: "I Wish it Would Snow", Balamory: "Panto", Fimbles: "Tune", Lunar Jim: "Too Many Fluffies", Charlie and Lola: "Snow is my Favourite and My Best", Big Cook Little Cook: "Father Christmas", The Roly Mo Show: "Too Cold", Tikkabilla: "Christmas Special", Tweenies: "White Christmas"
CBeebies: Get Set Go! Best of Sports	21 July 2008	Boogie Beebies: "Sporty Boogie", Charlie and Lola: "I Am Really, Really, Really Concentrating", Me Too: "Sports Day", The Large Family: "The Big Race", Tweenies: "Fast and Slow", LazyTown: "Sports Day", Little Robots: "Good Sport Sporty", Higgledy House: "Fitness", The Koala Brothers: "George's Big Race", Balamory: "Fun Run"
CBeebies: Bedtime	20 October 2008	Charlie and Lola: "I Am Not Sleepy and I Will Not Go to Bed", Fimbles: "Moon", Me Too: "I Want to Say Goodnight", Teletubbies: "Putting Angus to Bed", Jackanory Junior: "The King of Capri", The Roly Mo Show: "Sweet Dreams", Little Robots: "Sweet Dreams Scary", Balamory: "Bedtime", Tweenies: "Sleepover", Charlie and Lola: "Can You Maybe Turn the Light On?"
CBeebies: Big Fun Time	16 February 2009	Harry and Toto: "Stop and Go", Brum: "Airport Adventure", Little Robots: "Metal Makes Us Special", LazyTown: "Little Sportacus", Lunar Jim: "Rover's Big Dig", Higgledy House: "Babysitting", Charlie and Lola: "I Want to Be Much More Bigger Like You", The Large Family: "Elephants Never Forget", Tweenies: "When I'm Older", The Koala Brothers: "Mitzi's Busy Day", Boogie Beebies: "Roll Up, Roll Up", Tommy Zoom: "Confidence", Me Too: "Smiles and Frowns"
CBeebies: Discover + Do	25 May 2009	Get Squiggling: "Bloodhound", Tikkabilla: "Dressing up and Houses", Teletubbies: "Bubble Pictures", Balamory: "Treasure Hunt", Charlie and Lola: "I Wish I Could Draw Exactly Like You", Boogie Beebies: "Building", Tweenies: "Growing Bulbs", Big Cook Little Cook: "Explorer", Fimbles: "Cardboard Box"
CBeebies: Greatest Hits!	26 April 2010	Teletubbies Clip: "Follow My Leader" (From Teletubbies episode Carnival II; theme song and credits not included), Balamory: "Disco", Charlie and Lola: "I Can Dance Like a Dancer", The Roly Mo Show: "Making Music", 3rd and Bird: "A Chorus for Us!", LazyTown: "Rockin Robbie", Tweenies: "Favourite Songs", Harry and Toto: "Quiet and Loud", Boogie Beebies: "Baby Boogie", Little Robots: "The Sound of Music", Fimbly Songtime: "Fimble Dance", Tommy Zoom: "Boyz Noise", Big Cook Little Cook: "Pop Star", The Koala Brothers: "Josie's New Tune", Dirtgirlworld: "Creepy Crawly Concert"

=== Album releases ===
Five CBeebies-branded CDs have been released, CBeebies: The Official Album in 2002, My CBeebies Album in 2006, My CBeebies Album (Christmas Edition) in 2007, CBeebies: Song Time in 2010, and CBeebies: The Album in 2012.

=== CBeebies Land (2014-2023) ===
CBeebies Land opened in May 2014. Designed as a retheme of the previous Storybook Land and Old McDonald's Farmyard areas of the Alton Towers theme park, it contains a range of themed rides, attractions and live entertainment based around various CBeebies programmes. It offers various indoor and outdoor activities aimed at making an immersive and interactive world for children and young families.

The site based within Alton Towers Resort in Staffordshire includes some of the more popular characters from the original channel for guests to meet. Described as a "fun environment for pre-schoolers to play and learn" by critics. Before CBeebies Land, Alton Towers did not have enough rides suitable for young children and since opening, CBeebies Land now makes visiting the amusement park more entertaining for younger children.

In early 2014, the theme park sporadically released information on the characters involved in the development via their Facebook and Twitter accounts.

- On 4 January, Mr Tumble was the first character confirmed, featuring in the Something Special Sensory Garden and on 5 January, Mr. Bloom was confirmed as featuring in the development in the form of Mr Bloom's Allotments.
- On 6 January, the park revealed an In the Night Garden... redesign of their existing Riverbank Eyespy. It features many characters from the show, like Iggle Piggle, Upsy Daisy and Makka Pakka.

The fourth reveal on 7 January was that of Nina and the Neurons. It was an interactive science lab, which in 2024, became Cbeebies Land Sensory Space

More additions to CBeebies Land were added in 2022. In December 2021, it was confirmed that Alton Towers were adding three new attractions to CBeebies Land, there was Hey Duggee: The Big Adventure Badge which replaced Tree Fu Tom Training Camp, Andy's Adventures Dinosaur Dig which replaced Mr Bloom's Alloment and JoJo and GranGran at Home which replaced Charlie and Lola's Moonsquirters & Green drops. On 8 September 2025, a new Bluey rollercoaster was announced to CBeebies Land, which opened on 28 March 2026, on the former site of Postman Pat's Parcel Post.

== Awards ==
The UK channel and the programmes it has broadcast have received a number of awards throughout the years. In 2002, the CBeebies Interactive TV Services were nominated in the Best Interactive Service category and CBeebies Online was nominated in the same category in 2005 at the British Academy Children's Awards. The channel was awarded Best Children's Channel and Highly Commended at the Broadcast Digital Channel Awards 2006; however, it was only nominated in 2007 and 2008. The channel was also named Children's Channel of the Year at the BAFTA Children's awards in 2006, 2010, 2011, 2013, 2016, 2018 and 2019 and was nominated for Channel of the Year several times, including in 2008.

The CBeebies UK website was nominated Best Interactive Site at the 2007 BAFTA Children's awards, and the brand as a whole also won the Best Design and Innovation award by the Royal Television Society, whose awarding panel said "Its website is an integral part of the brand, with its TV production and online teams working together to create innovative game play and immersive web experiences."
