= Michael Carrington (television executive) =

Australian television executive (born 1961)

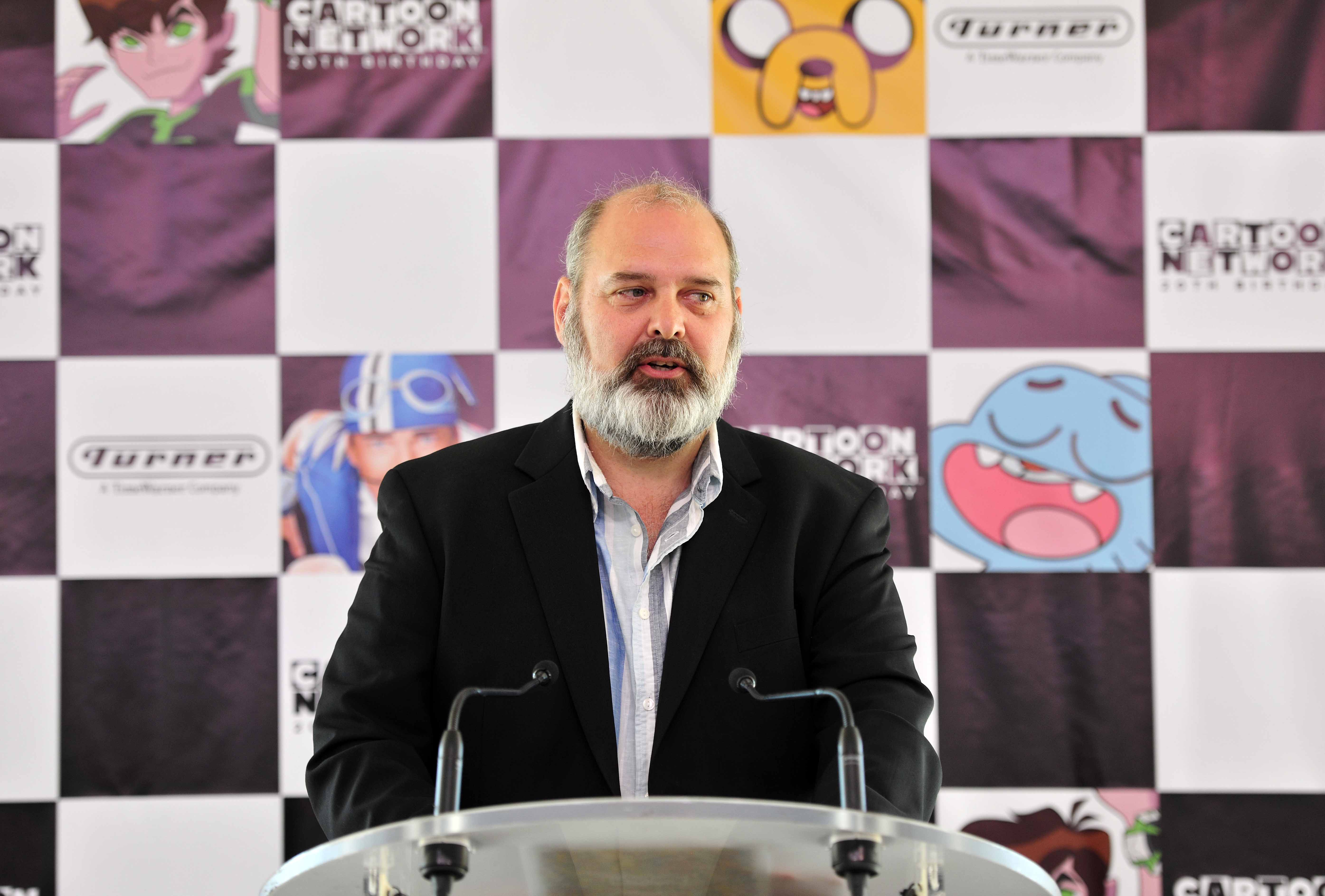
- Carrington gives CN 20th-anniversary speech in 2012.
- Born: Michael Andrew Chuprin-Plicha; 5 May 1961 (age 65); Camden, New South Wales, Australia
- Occupation: Broadcast media executive
- Years active: 1986–2024
- Spouse: S. Palluel

Michael Andrew Carrington (born Michael Andrew Chuprin-Plicha, 5 May 1961) is an Australian broadcast media executive. He was Director, Entertainment and Specialist at the ABC based in Sydney, New South Wales. He oversaw all national radio, television, and digital services including ABC TV (ABC1), ABC TV Plus (ABC2), ABC Me, ABC Kids plus ABC iview, ABC Listen, ABC Kids Listen, ABC Classic FM, ABC Jazz, ABC Country, and Radio National.

== Early life ==
Of Russian and English descent, Carrington was born in 1961 in Camden, New South Wales, Australia to Hubert John Plicha and Elaine Marshall. The family lived in Campbelltown, New South Wales until 1974 when they moved to Parkes, New South Wales, where Carrington attended Parkes High School graduating in 1979.

Carrington's father was born Vitalik Aleksandrovich Chuprin (Russian: Виталий Александрович Чуприн) in Rostov-on-Don, Russia and is a direct descendant of Jacob Wiens, a co-founder of the Mennonites. Carrington's paternal grandmother, Margarita Chuprin (née Wiens) had remarried after World War II and his father's name was changed by adoption. They emigrated to Australia, sailing on the Fairsea, departing Naples, Italy 3 December 1949, and arriving in Sydney on New Year's Eve.

== Career ==
After working as a DJ on Radio Station 2PK in Australia, he joined the Royal Australian Navy as a communications sailor. Following a four-year commission, he joined the children's department at Network 10 in Sydney, where he worked on the magazine show Ridgey Didge and the game shows Double Dare and Family Double Dare. On immigrating to the United Kingdom in 1990, he joined the Bought Films Unit at BBC television. A year later he joined the Discovery Channel Europe as an acquisitions executive. He was appointed deputy head of programme acquisitions in 1993 for BBC Children's Television, latterly seconded to research and develop broadcast strategy for CBBC and CBeebies with the deputy director of television, David Docherty. In May 2000, he joined LEGO TV & Film as Head of Television and New Media, responsible for programme development and production, where he was co-executive producer on Little Robots. In 2004, he joined the BBC as head of animation & acquisitions, where he gained broadcast rights over Lunar Jim, The Koala Brothers and LazyTown. He commissioned a variety of UK-made animation series including Charlie and Lola, Shaun the Sheep, The Snow Queen, Timmy Time and The Secret Show.

In May 2006, the commissioning of the BBC's Children services was split into two and Carrington was appointed the controller of CBeebies, taking responsibility for all the channels output across Radio, Television and Online; commissioning award-winning programmes like In the Night Garden..., Something Special and Waybuloo. Carrington cast CBeebies' first disabled presenter, Cerrie Burnell, as a member of the presenting team in 2009.

In April 2010, Carrington was appointed chief content officer for Cartoon Network EMEA at Turner Broadcasting System Europe, and General Manager of TBS Studios Arabia. He also served as chairman of the Turner LazyTown Operational Board, and was executive producer of LazyTown and The Amazing World of Gumball. Carrington joined HIT Entertainment in February 2013 to oversee its content slate, Thomas & Friends, Bob the Builder, Fireman Sam, and Mike the Knight globally. In July 2014, it was announced that Carrington was appointed CEO of UK production company The Foundation, which became part of Zodiak Kids Studios in April 2015, as well as Marathon Media and Tele-Images Productions each based in France. Carrington led the Zodiak Kids Studios umbrella brand as its CEO, before moving to ABC-TV in Sydney. At MIPCOM in October 2017, Carrington was awarded with the World Screen Kids Trendsetter Award for his contribution to the global children's media industry.

Carrington retired at the end of 2024.

=== Organizations ===
Michael Carrington is a founder patron of the Children's Media Foundation and serves on the advisory committee for the Children's Media Conference. He is a member of the British Academy of Film and Television Arts (BAFTA), a member of the Royal Television Society, Australian Film Institute and the International Academy of Television Arts and Sciences.

Media offices
Preceded by Dorothy Prior	Controller of CBeebies, BBC; 2006–2010	Succeeded by Kay Benbow
Preceded by Finn Arnesen	Chief Content Officer Cartoon Network, Turner Broadcasting; 2010–2013	Succeeded by Patricia Hildago
Preceded by Deirdre Brennan	Head, Children's and Education, ABC TV; 2016–2018	Succeeded by Libbie Doherty
Preceded by Rebecca Heap	Head, Content Curation & Distribution, ABC TV; 2018–2020	Succeeded by Roberta Allan
Preceded by David N. Anderson	Director, Entertainment & Specialist ABC TV; 2018–2022	Succeeded by Chris Oliver-Taylor
