= Kew Madagascar Conservation Centre =

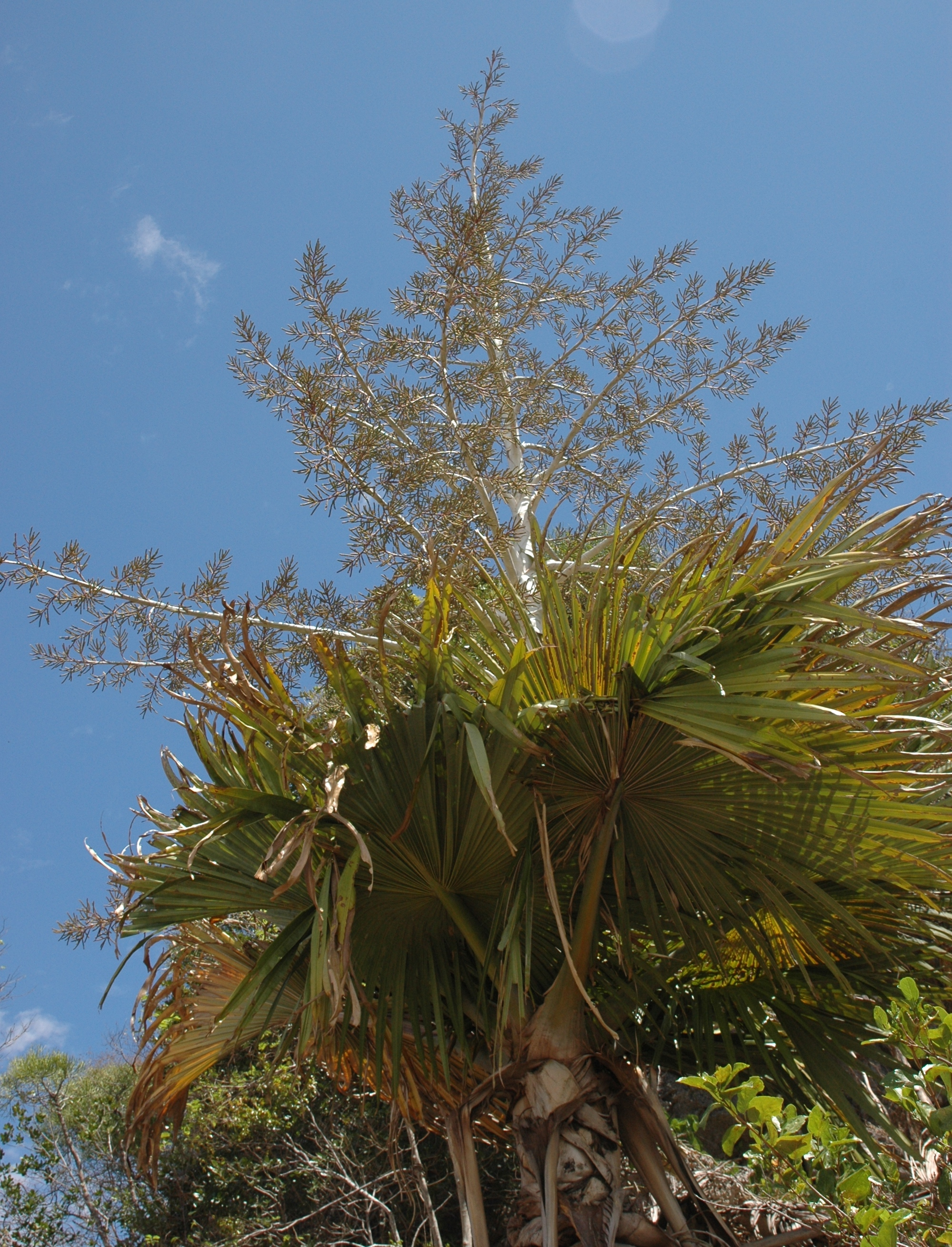
- KMCC's work includes research on threatened plants such as the palm Tahina spectabilis
- Abbreviation: KMCC
- Type: non-governmental organization
- Purpose: plant research and conservation
- Headquarters: Antananarivo, Madagascar
- Region served: Madagascar
- KMCC manager: Dr. Hélène Ralimanana
- Parent organization: Royal Botanic Gardens, Kew
- Staff: 40(2021)

The Kew Madagascar Conservation Centre (KMCC) is a non-governmental organisation working on plant research and conservation in Madagascar. It is a dependency of the Royal Botanic Gardens, Kew and Kew's third research site. Aside its main office in the capital Antananarivo, KMCC has local teams in Ambanja, Bongolava, Morondava and Itremo.
