= Christopher Aidan Gilligan =

Professor of Mathematical Biology

Christopher Aidan Gilligan CBE, Sc.D.
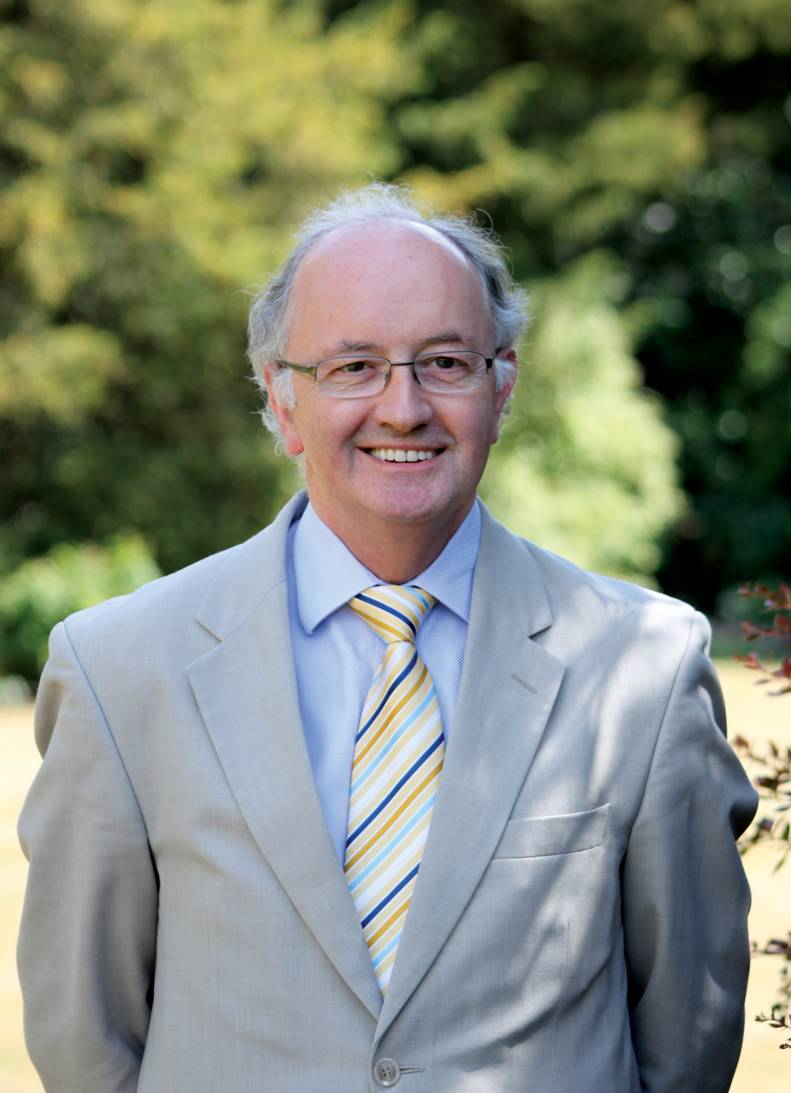
- Professor of Mathematical Biology

Academic background
- Education: University of Cambridge Sc.D. University of Oxford DPhil.

Academic work
- Institutions: Department of Plant Sciences, University of Cambridge
- Main interests: Epidemiology & modelling
- Website: https://www.plantsci.cam.ac.uk/staff/professor-chris-gilligan

Christopher Aidan Gilligan CBE, Sc.D. (born 9 January 1953) is Director of Research, Professor of Mathematical Biology and is Head of the Epidemiology and Modelling Group in the Department of Plant Sciences at the University of Cambridge. He was Head of the School of Biological Sciences at Cambridge from 2009 until 2013 and is a Fellow of King's College. He is currently the King's Trustee of the Royal Botanic Gardens, Kew.

Gilligan is best known for designing and testing theoretical frameworks to explain and predict the dynamics of epidemics in crops and natural environments at a range of scales up to country-wide and continental. The models provide real-time guidance for emerging epidemics in more than fourteen countries in sub-Saharan Africa, as well as the UK, US, Australia, Nepal and Bangladesh.

== Education and training ==
After early schooling in Ireland, where he was born, Gilligan attended St Mary's College, Crosby. He attended Keble College, University of Oxford, where he received a Bachelor of Arts in Agricultural and Forest Sciences in 1974. Gilligan gained a DPhil at Wolfson College, Oxford in 1977 and was awarded a Sc.D. (Cantab.) for his research in the Epidemiological of Plant Disease in 1999.

== Career and research ==
At the University of Cambridge, Gilligan held lectureships in the Departments of Applied Biology (1982–1989) and Plant Sciences (1989–1995), with a secondment as a visiting Professor, Dept Botany & Plant Pathology, Colorado State University (1982). After a Readership position (1995–1999) he gained a personal chair in Mathematical Biology, which led Gilligan to establish the Epidemiology and Modelling Group in the Dept of Plant Sciences. Gilligan took up the position of Head of School in Biological Sciences, University of Cambridge from 2009 to 2013, combining research and teaching with university administration and contributions to national and international science policy. He has introduced and taught innovative courses in mathematical biology at Cambridge while also serving as a Director of Studies for Natural Sciences at King's College. He established the Strategic Research Initiative in Global Food Security and co-chaired the Interdisciplinary Research Centre in Global Food Security at Cambridge

Gilligan has a wide range of national and international experience at senior level in setting and monitoring research strategy and advising Government bodies on policy. He held Prime Ministerial appointments as Trustee of the Natural History Museum and Trustee of the Silsoe Research Institute (1998–2008). He was chair of the UK Joint Nature Conservation Committee (2014–2020), the public body that advises the UK Government, Devolved Administrations and Overseas Territories on UK-wide and international nature conservation. He chaired the Science Advisory Council of the UK Department for Environment Food & Rural Affairs from 2011 to 2014 and served two terms as a member of the UK Biotechnology and Biological Science Research Council from 2003 to 2009. He was a Trustee of the James Hutton Institute (2021-2024) and has been appointed by the UK Government as a Trustee of the Royal Botanic Gardens, Kew. He has chaired a number of reviews of research institutes in the UK, France and Austria. Major strategic reviews that have had significant influence on national policy include the UK Government Taskforce on Tree Heath and Plant Biosecurity that reported in 2013 with all recommendations being accepted by the Government, the crop science review for BBSRC in 2003-04 and the review of science strategy for the Institute of Animal Health in 2006. He has provided advice to the Gates Foundation and UK FCDO on the use of epidemiological models to support food security in Sub-Saharan Africa.

Gilligan's research in epidemiology has led him to work at the interface between biology, mathematics and economics. He has published more than 260 papers and reviews, establishing and testing a theoretical framework to understand the dynamics and control of epidemics in crops and natural environments at a range of scales up to country-wide and continental. The methods for parameter estimation and economic epidemiology also apply to problems of human and livestock disease with Gilligan's team publishing an influential paper early in the Covid pandemic that contributed to changes in policy on the epidemiological value of facemasks.

== Personal life ==
Gilligan is married to Joan Margaret (née Flood) and has one son and three daughters.

== Awards and honours ==
Gilligan was awarded a CBE in the Queen's Birthday Honours for services to plant health in the field of epidemiology (2015). He held a BBSRC Professorial Research Fellowship (2004–10) and a Royal Society Leverhulme Trust Senior Research Fellowship (1998-19). He was President of the British Society for Plant Pathology (2001), an Honorary Research Fellow of Rothamsted Research (1998–2015), and is an Honorary Fellow of the American Phytopathological Society (2005).
