= Alice Webb =

British television executive

Alice Webb is a British television executive. She is CEO of Mercury Studios, an arm of the Universal Music Group, established on her appointment in 2020. The newly formed company is the parent of Eagle Rock Entertainment.

== BBC Children's ==
Prior to this role, she was Director of BBC Children's, leading the BBC's services for UK children. She had been appointed to this role in March 2015, when Webb was chief operating officer, BBC North where she had been responsible for moving BBC Children's, 5 Live, and the BBC Learning and BBC Sport divisions out of London to a new campus based at Salford Quays.

In September 2015, Webb set out a digital plan for BBC Children's which included i-play, finally launched as BBC i-player kids on 12 April 2016. In November 2016, she appeared before the House of Lord's Communications Select Committee who questioned her about a CBBC programme entitled Just A Girl which explored transgender issues.

Webb is a trustee of the BBC's charity, Children In Need, a member of The Royal Foundation's Cyberbullying Taskforce and an executive board member of the UK Council for Child Internet Safety.

In December 2017, Webb chaired the 5th Children's Global Media Summit in Manchester, England in which she launched Own It on BBC, "a single, universal tool for children to report (cyber) bullying when they see it or experience it," on a shared platform with Prince William, Duke of Cambridge.

Media offices
| Preceded by Kay Benbow (Acting) | Director: BBC; Children's Television; March 2015–2020 | Succeeded by Patricia Hidalgo Reina |
