= Curators of the Royal Botanic Gardens, Kew =

The post of Curator of the Royal Botanic Gardens, Kew was established in 1841. When the Royal Botanic Gardens Kew came into state ownership in 1841 Sir Willian Jackson Hooker (1785–1865) was appointed its first Director. Over the period 1841 to 1856 Hooker established four curatorial posts at Kew, namely:

- Curator of the Royal Botanic Gardens (1842)
- Curator of the Pleasure Grounds (1848)
- Curator of the Herbarium (1853)
- Curator of Museums (1856)

In the 1890s the Curator lived in a dedicated residence near the gardens' main entrance (which is now Elizabeth Gate). The Curator’s Office was (1910 to 1974) at the northeast corner of the gardens adjacent to the junction of Kew Road and Mortlake Road.

The following is a list of Curators of the Royal Botanic Gardens from 1841. The curatorship has not been filled since 2011.

== Curators of the Royal Botanic Gardens, Kew from 1841 ==
- 1842–1864 John Smith I (1798–1888)
- 1864–1886 John Smith II (1821–1888)
- 1886–1901 George Nicholson (1847–1908)
- 1901–1922 William Watson (1858–1925)
- 1922–1929 William Jackson Bean (1863–1947)
- 1929–1932 Thomas William Taylor (1879–1932)
- 1932–1937 John Coutts (1872–1952)
- 1937–1960 William Macdonald Campbell (1900–1964)
- 1960–1965 Lewis Stenning (1901–1965)
- 1966–1972 Richard L. Shaw (1928–)
- 1972–1995 John Barry Eves Simmons (1937–)
- 1995–2011 Dr Nigel Paul Taylor (1956–)'

== Other curators at Kew ==
William Hooker's other curatorships were:

- Curator of the Pleasure Grounds. The Pleasure Grounds, the 200 acres (81 ha) of grass and woodland and 350 acres (140 ha) of Deer Park, to the south of the original Botanic Garden were managed separately under a Curator. The first, and last, Curator of the Pleasure Grounds, Alexander Williamson, took up the post in 1848 and retired in 1866 after which the role was abolished and the duties were transferred to the Curator of the Botanic Gardens.
- Curator of the Herbarium. The first Curator, Allan A. Black, was appointed in 1853 and was in post until 1864. Now named the Herbarium Curation Manager.
- Curator of Museums (Economic Botany) Alexander Smith was appointed in 1856, he was in post until 1858. Also called the Keeper of Museum.

In addition several other curatorships have existed.

- Deputy (or Assistant) Curator of the Botanic Gardens,
- Departmental Assistant Curators: Herbaceous; Arboretum; Decorative; Temperate; Tropical.
- Recent and current Curators:
  - Curator of Living Collections
  - Senior Curator Botanist
  - Curator Botanist
  - Digitisation Curator

== See also ==
- Directors of the Royal Botanic Gardens, Kew
