= Kay Benbow =

British broadcasting executive (1961–2024)

Kay Benbow (November 1961 – 24 March 2024) was a British broadcasting executive, and was the Controller of the BBC channel CBeebies from 2010 to 2017.

== Early life ==
Kay Benbow was born in Sheffield. Her secondary education was at Littleover Community School. She studied theology at St Hugh's College, Oxford, matriculating in 1980. She joined the BBC in 1984.

=== BBC Children's ===
Kay Benbow began working for BBC Children's in 1988. She moved to CBeebies in 2002. CBeebies launched in February 2002. During this time she also spent two years outside the BBC at Tell-Tale Productions until 2000. She became the second Controller of CBeebies in May 2010. In October 2014 Benbow became Acting Director of BBC Children's following the resignation of Joe Godwin, until the appointment of Alice Webb in February 2015.

Under Benbow's control, CBeebies won the BAFTA Children's Award for Channel of the Year in 2010, 2011, 2013 and 2016. In January 2017, she was awarded an honorary degree from the University of Sheffield in recognition of her achievements in the industry and her commitment to research-informed understanding of young children's engagement with television. In July 2017, it was announced that the post of Controller of CBeebies would close and Benbow left the BBC at the end of that year.

Benbow said that she would, "leave with pride, knowing that CBeebies is in great shape, is loved by the audience and will go from strength to strength. I have always said that the very young deserve the very best and I have strived to give them just that. It is my hope that CBeebies inspires them and makes a positive impact on their lives, helping to create happy, confident children".

== Personal life ==
She lived in South Bucks until her death in 24 March 2024, at the age of 62.

Media offices
Preceded by Michael Carrington	Controller: CBeebies; May 2010 – 2017	Succeeded by Role abolished
Preceded by Joe Godwin	Director: BBC Children's Television; October 2014 – February 2015 (Acting)	Succeeded by Alice Webb
