= BBC Children's and Education =

Division responsible for media content

The logo for BBC Children's & Education.

BBC Children's and Education is the BBC division responsible for media content for children in the UK.

== History ==
=== 1930–1952 ===
The BBC has produced and broadcast television programmes for children since the 1930s. The first children-specific strand on BBC was For the Children, first broadcast on what was then the single 'BBC Television Service' on Saturday 24 April 1937; it was only ten minutes long. It lasted for two years before being taken off air when the service closed due to the Second World War in September 1939.

Following the war, For the Children recommenced on Sunday 7 July 1946, with a 20-minute slot every Sunday afternoon and the addition of programmes for preschool children under the banner For The Very Young, and over the years they became an established feature of the early afternoons on the BBC's main channel BBC1.

=== 1952–1964 ===
In 1952, the "For the Children" / "For the Very Young" branding was dropped; older children's programmes were introduced by regular continuity announcers, while younger children's programming was broadcast under the Watch with Mother banner.

Significant series for older children that began in the 1950s included The Sooty Show and Blue Peter.

=== 1964–1985 ===
The 1964 launch of BBC2 allowed additional room for young children's programming. On 21 April 1964, Play School became its first official programme after a power outage meant the opening night launch programmes were never broadcast.

Away from the screen, in 1964, the Children's department was briefly amalgamated with Women's Programmes to form Family Programmes until it was reinstated in 1967. Around this time, the production offices moved to the newly developed BBC Television Centre in White City with most offices being based in the East Tower where they remained until its closure in 2011.

Other significant series that began in the 1960s include The Clangers and in 1965, the long running story telling format, Jackanory.

Significant series that began in the 1970s included the long-running children's news service, Newsround. In 1975, The Watch with Mother branding was dropped. In 1976, Saturday Morning television began in earnest with the launch of Multi-Coloured Swap Shop. In 1978, Grange Hill, a contemporary drama series set in a comprehensive school, began.

Roger Gale, later an MP for the Conservative Party, was head of children's television from 1976 to 1979.

Significant series that began in the 1980s include Postman Pat. On 1 October 1980, See-Saw was launched (Watch with Mother branding having ended in 1975), which was moved to BBC2 in June 1987, before ending in 1990.

In 1983, a Diamond Jubilee Festival Exhibition commemorated the sixtieth anniversary of BBC Children's Programmes at the Langham Hotel in London. The exhibition then moved to the Liverpool Garden Festival in 1984.

=== 1985–2002 ===
Until 1985, children's programmes on BBC1 were introduced by the usually off-screen continuity announcer, though often specially designed menus and captions would be used. In September of that year, the block rebranded as Children's BBC, and for the first time had a dedicated Children's BBC logo. It was described in a BBC press release as, "a new package of programmes specially gift-wrapped for children." Early graphics and idents were generated by a BBC Micro computer, with which the BBC had been increasingly been experimenting with and utilising in their children's programming continuity for a year or so prior to the rebrand.

The most significant change was that the continuity announcer was seen on screen (in-vision). Rather than use the existing BBC1 announcer, a new presenter was selected. The launch presenter was Phillip Schofield, presenting the slot for the first time at 15:55 BST on 9 September 1985. Remaining in the small continuity booth at Television Centre, during the first few days of these broadcasts, Schofield began to refer to the space as "The Broom Cupboard", due to its very small size, and supposedly due to the BBC only sparing a small broom cupboard for him to host from. This quickly became an established name for the space, even appearing in billings as such. A list of CBBC presenters shows that many more followed and this style of presentation continued and remains on the CBBC channel as of 2025.

During the 1990s, Children's BBC began to be informally referred to on-air as CBBC (this occurred at around the same time that ITV's rival service Children's ITV began to be referred to as CITV in a similar manner). The official billing name and on-air branding of Children's BBC remained in place, however, until the BBC's network-wide branding refresh on 4 October 1997, when the official billing name and on-air branding changed to CBBC (Children's ITV changed their official billing name to CITV after their own branding refresh the following year).

From 1996 to 1999, CBBC programmes were also shown on the channel Nickelodeon, as part of the CBBC on Nickelodeon (known as Children's BBC on Nickelodeon from 1996 to 1997) programming block. The CBBC on Nickelodeon block was originally hosted by Otis the Aardvark from its launch until 4 October 1997, when he was replaced by Marvin P. Porcevark, who unlike Otis, never appeared on the original CBBC block.

The launch of digital channel BBC Choice in 1998 saw the channel broadcasting children's programming in a Saturday afternoon slot which was subsequently replaced by the daily 6 am to 7 pm service CBBC on Choice, which aired archive preschool programming and was itself the precursor of the current CBBC and CBeebies channels.

=== 2002–2012 ===
In 2002, the launch of the CBBC and CBeebies channels saw a wide variety of programmes, both new and archive, being shown again on the new channels from 6 am or 7 am until 7 pm.

In 2005, the Secretary of State for Culture, Media and Sport, Tessa Jowell, was questioned in the House of Commons as to whether a public service broadcaster should really be broadcasting "lavatorial" humour. Ms Jowell responded that it was the government's job to develop a charter for the BBC; and then the BBC's job to determine standards of taste, decency, and appropriateness.

BBC Children's relocated to BBC Bridge House, MediaCityUK in Salford Quays in May 2011. In September 2011, the flagship magazine show Blue Peter began live broadcasts from its new home, with daily news programme Newsround joining it in November 2011.

=== 2012–present ===
Following the decline in viewing on BBC One and BBC Two and as part of the Delivering Quality First proposals submitted by the BBC in October 2011 and approved by the BBC Trust in May 2012, it was announced all children's programming on BBC One and Two would be moved permanently to the CBBC and CBeebies channels following the digital switchover. It was found that the majority of child viewers watched the programmes on these channels already and that only 7% of these children watched CBBC programmes on BBC One and Two. Children's programming on BBC One ended on 21 December 2012 with the CBeebies' morning strand on BBC Two ending on 4 January 2013.

In November 2015, as a further aspect of the Delivering Quality First plan that resulted in the replacement of BBC Three with a branded digital presence, the BBC Trust approved a proposal for CBBC to extend its broadcast day by two hours, using bandwidth previously reserved for BBC Three. The two new hours are aimed towards an older youth audience.

On 14 March 2016, CBBC unveiled a new logo and on-air presentation, featuring an abstract, multicoloured wordmark enclosed in a box. CBBC controller Cheryl Taylor stated that the new brand was designed to be "fun and unpredictable" and would "appeal to both ends of our broad age spectrum". The logo was also meant to be suitable for use across digital platforms. On 11 April 2016, CBBC officially extended its broadcast day to be from 7:00 am to 9:00 pm.

Throughout the decade, changes in viewing patterns had an impact on BBC Children's services. Ofcom research showed that between 2010 and 2017, television viewing dropped by 40% for children aged 4–9 and by 47% for children aged 10–15.

On 4 July 2017, the BBC announced as part of its inaugural Annual Plan for 2017–18, that it would invest an additional £34 million into children's content for digital platforms over the next three years, in an effort to counter changes in viewing habits.

In 2019, it was announced that the Children's and Education departments would merge to become BBC Children's and Education.

In March 2021, the BBC announced that the CBBC channel's broadcast hours would be reduced, closing at 7 pm instead of 9 pm each day from January 2022. This is a return to the channel's broadcast hours before their extension in 2016. The move is to make way for the return of BBC Three to linear broadcast television.

In May 2022, it was announced that CBBC would eventually be discontinued as a linear channel, along with BBC Four and BBC Radio 4 Extra, but also that this would not happen for "at least the next three years", although this was later repreived in 2024.

== Management ==
Overall strategic responsibility for all of the BBC's services for children rests with the Director of Children's, Patricia Hidalgo Reina (since May 2020), with commissioning decisions made by a Head of Commissioning and Acquisitions for the 0–6 age group and 7–12 age group, respectively. The 7–12 age group is commissioned by Sarah Muller since Feb 2021, with the 0–6 age group post waiting to be filled.

== Programming ==
BBC Children's commissions and acquires a wide range of programme types, including drama, preschool, news, entertainment, and factual programming. Therefore it's often seen as offering a similar mix of formats to the wider BBC, albeit tailored to suit a young audience. Byker Grove was one of the very few shows that was not aimed at young children, rather a more teenage/young adult audience as it dealt with some controversial themes.

The longest-running programme is the magazine show Blue Peter. Other current programmes include Teletubbies, Clangers, Hey Duggee, In the Night Garden, The Story of Tracy Beaker, 4 O'Clock Club, Almost Never, The Dumping Ground, Got What It Takes?, Horrible Histories, Junior Bake Off, Sidekick, Odd Squad, Shaun the Sheep, Danger Mouse, and more.

== Scheduling on BBC One and BBC Two ==
Following the launch of Children's BBC as a branded block in 1985, the introduction of BBC1's daytime schedule in October 1986 led to the daily weekday offering of BBC Children's consisting of

- A 30-minute block on BBC1 at 10:25 am usually including the 'main' preschool show (Play School, then from 1988 Playbus/Playdays), children's birthday cards, and a cartoon.
- A 15-minute preschool programme or programmes on BBC2 at 13:20 (often the slot for You and Me). This had previously been shown on BBC1.
- The main afternoon block aimed at older children from 15:50 (16:10 in July and August) to 17:35.

Weekend programmes consisted chiefly of Saturday morning programmes on BBC1, such as Going Live!. 1986 saw the introduction of children's programmes on Sunday mornings. They were shown on BBC2 between October and January when the Open University was not being shown, and in the following year, this was expanded into an all-morning block, initially called Now on Two, later rebranded to But First This on 2. Children's programmes had traditionally been broadcast on weekdays during the school holidays and the launch of daytime television saw this expanded during the summer holidays into a three-hour block, broadcast from 9:05 am until 12:00 pm on BBC1 and branded But First This. By 1992, children's programmes broadcast all morning on BBC2 leading up to the older pop show The O Zone.

Periodically, Children's BBC Scotland was aired in the Scottish school holidays on BBC One Scotland and BBC Two Scotland throughout the 1990s, where the block (like CBeebies Alba and CBBC Alba) featured its own presentation and presenters (as an opt out from the network) linking into various shows airing on BBC Scotland's regional versions of the summer holiday mid-morning slot, the Children's BBC Breakfast Show and the summer holiday children's programme Up For It, until the CBBC Scotland opt outs were discontinued by July 2000.

The lunchtime block also continued to air on BBC2. From 1990 to 1993, like the previous block "See-Saw", this was introduced by the continuity announcer. In 1993, Children's BBC launched a "Lunchtime Club" for this slot and introduced by the then rota of Children's BBC presenters. In 1996, it was handed back to the continuity announcer's duty again to introduce the programmes. From 1998 to 1999, just an ident was played out with no announcements.

In 1995, children's programmes started to be shown on BBC2 at weekday breakfast. The block was called Children's BBC Breakfast Show. By 2000, the CBBC Breakfast Show would air from 07:00 to 09:00, extended in the school holidays with CBBC mostly on BBC One in the Christmas holidays, followed by the birthday card slot from 10:00 to 10:50, often linked by one of the Breakfast Show presenters; a single or more preschooler shows would air around 1:00 pm, also on BBC Two, linked by one of the presenters and Emlyn the Gremlyn then the afternoon block on BBC One would begin at 3:25 pm with a mixture of younger kids shows and older kids' shows, linked by two presenters and Emlyn the Gremlyn. Weekend programmes consisted chiefly of Saturday morning programmes on BBC One with CBBC from 07:00 to 09:00, Linked by the presenters, with Live & Kicking taking over from 09:00 until 12:10. Sunday mornings consisted of the CBBC Birthday Cards on BBC One from spring until the autumn with CBBC on BBC Two starting from 08:15 in the spring and summer and at 07:00 in the autumn and winter with the slot finishing at 11:15. In the summer, the CBBC slot would begin on BBC Two at 07:00 in its breakfast show slot before switching to BBC One at 09:00, finishing at 11:15.

=== Relaunch to CBeebies and CBBC ===
On 3 September 2001, children's programming on CBBC got separated in the lead up to the launch of two children's channels which would be separated for different age groups, the CBBC Breakfast Show would air older children's shows from 07:00 to 08:10, followed by a block of younger kids' programmes from 08:10 to 10:50, often linked by one of the Breakfast Show presenters; a single preschooler show would air around 1:00 pm, also on BBC Two, then the afternoon block on BBC One would begin at 3:25 pm with 25 minutes of shows for the under-sevens, presented mostly in voiceover, followed from 3:50 pm by the older kids' shows, linked in-vision.

When the CBeebies and CBBC digital channels began, children's programming on BBC One and BBC Two remained in the same slots but adopted the new branding. Viewing figures were considerably higher on BBC One and Two as not every viewer could receive the digital channels either because the service was not available in their area or because they had old equipment not able to receive it.

Several changes were made in scheduling for the morning CBeebies programmes in 2003 due to changes in Prime Ministers Questions. From January 2003, CBBC ran from 07:00 to 09:00, with CBeebies running from 09:00, finishing at 10:50 (Monday and Tuesdays), 11:00 (Wednesdays) or 10:20 (Thursdays and Fridays). The 1:00pm slot was ditched in December 2002. Further changes occurred saw the changeover move to 08:30 in April 2003, and an early morning CBeebies slot from 06:30 to 07:00 (later extended to 06:00). Finally, from January 2004, CBeebies programming on BBC Two was cut to finish at 10:30 daily.

From April 2004 to July 2005, the children’s programme blocks were reorganised in the existing blocks, with CBBC airing from 06:00 to 08:00, then CBeebies from 08:00 to 10:30. The CBeebies on BBC Two schedule was a near simulcast of the CBeebies channel (though with BBC Two specific promotions), however from November 2004 BBC Two steered away from the simulcast at 10:00 and provided different programmes. In September 2005, the previous January 2004 schedule was reinstated, albeit with a shorter run time of 07:00 to 10:00 (extended back to 10:30 in January 2006).

From January 2007 until November 2012, the morning block consisted of 60 minutes of CBeebies-branded content from 06:00, followed by ninety minutes of CBBC from 07:00, then further CBeebies content from 08:30; in the afternoon on BBC One, there was a block of CBeebies content from 3:25 pm to 3:45pm (3:15pm from February 2008), followed by CBBC content for the remainder of the afternoon slot. Following the removal of BBC Schools' content from daytime BBC Two (into the BBC Learning Zone), the time allocated to CBeebies on BBC Two was extended; first to 11:00 in September 2008, then to 11:30 in September 2010.

=== 2008–09: Shift to earlier BBC Slot in weekday afternoons ===
On 11 February 2008, following the move of The Weakest Link from BBC Two to BBC One, CBBC on BBC One was shifted to run from 3:05 to 5:15 pm rather than from 3:25 to 5:35 pm as before, in order to accommodate the 45 minute show before the Six O Clock News. The changes were made following the BBC's loss of the rights to soap opera Neighbours, which had for many years been broadcast between the end of CBBC and the start of the 6 pm news; when the decision was made to move daytime editions of both The Weakest Link and Pointless which debuted in 2009 from BBC Two to One to fill the gap, CBBC had to move to an earlier slot as Weakest Link and Pointless were longer than Neighbours was.

In 2009, a report published by the BBC Trust found that scheduling changes which took place in February 2008, where programming ended at 17:15, had led to a decrease in viewers. This was especially noticeable for Blue Peter and Newsround, two of CBBC's flagship programmes; Blue Peter was recording its lowest viewing numbers since it started in 1958, and Newsround received fewer than 100,000 viewers compared to 225,000 in 2007.

=== 2012–13: End of children's programmes on BBC One and BBC Two ===
Following the decline in viewing on BBC One and BBC Two and as part of the Delivering Quality First proposals submitted by the BBC in October 2011 and approved by the BBC Trust in May 2012, it was announced all children's programming on BBC One and Two would be moved permanently to the CBBC and CBeebies channels following the digital switchover. It was found that the majority of child viewers watched the programmes on these channels already and that only 7% of these children watched CBBC programmes on BBC One and Two. Children's programming on BBC One ended on 21 December 2012 with the CBeebies' morning strand on BBC Two ending on 4 January 2013.

=== 2017–present: Return to BBC Two ===
CBBC programming returned to BBC Two on Saturday mornings in September 2017 when Saturday Mash-Up! launched, however this strand continues to use the regular BBC continuity announcers and not the CBBC presenters.

On 11 January 2021, programming for children returned to BBC Two to provide educational content for children during school closures as a result of the COVID-19 lockdown. In September 2022, CBeebies/CBBC programming (including Newsround) returned to BBC Two when its Saturday morning strand rebranded as the "Kids Zone".

== Other services ==
=== CBBC Extra ===
CBBC Extra, launched in 2005, was a free interactive television service from CBBC provided by BBC Red Button which was available on all digital platforms in the United Kingdom. It was accessible from the CBBC channel by pressing red and then selecting CBBC Extra. It could also be accessed from any other BBC channel by pressing red and going to page number 570. The service differed across digital platforms, for example digital satellite (i.e. Sky) viewers could access a video loop, however its availability on digital terrestrial (Freeview) was dependent upon BBC Red Button not showing other interactive services, such as major sports events coverage. Prior to CBBC's rebranding in 2016, CBBC Extra was shut down.

=== CBBC website ===
The CBBC website provides a wide range of activities for children aged 6–15, such as games, videos, puzzles, print and makes, including now defunct pre-moderated message boards, now replaced with comment threads below videos, games and articles. It also contains a TV guide and an area where kids can apply to be on a show. It provides content for all brands including Tracy Beaker, Sam & Mark's Big Friday Wind-Up, Horrible Histories, Stacey Dooley's Show Me What You're Made Of, Shaun the Sheep, Blue Peter, Newsround, Danger Mouse, The Dumping Ground, Wolfblood, Eve, Dick and Dom, Hetty Feather, Hank Zipzer, The Sarah Jane Adventures, and DIXI. It also gives kids the chance to view the BBC iPlayer to replay or catch up their favourite CBBC programmes for up to 1 year.

=== Gaelic and Welsh services ===
BBC-produced children's programming, in native languages of Scotland and Wales, also airs on BBC Alba and S4C, respectively.

=== High definition channels ===
CBBC programmes were also broadcast in high definition alongside other BBC content on BBC HD, generally at afternoons on weekends, unless the channel was covering other events. When BBC HD was closed on 26 March 2013, CBBC HD launched on 10 December 2013.

== Logos ==
Logo used from 1997 to 2002, until the launch of the new channels

Logo used from 2002 to 2005

Logo used from 2005 to 2007

Logo used from 2007 to 2016

Logo used from 2016 to 2023

Logo that has been in use since 2023
