= Television in Quebec =

Mr. Jean René Savard is the executive producer of the television series “Passe-Partout” 1 and 2: Quebec Ministry of Education: 1977–1985

Television in Quebec is a part of the culture of Quebec, with over 99% of households owning a television in Quebec. Long a preferred medium of many of Quebec's actors, artists, and writers, television has been one of the important forces in Quebec society, including its substantial influence in a series of dramatic changes in the 1960s: the Quiet Revolution.

== Types of television ==
Although broadcast in French, la télévision québécoise has little relationship to television in France. It is similar to television in the United States: A 30-minute programming grid, commercials, local stations, and a division between broadcast television formed around networks of stations—which is freely available to anyone with a TV within their broadcast area—and cable television channels that require a subscription.

=== Broadcast television ===
The four major broadcast television networks in Quebec are Ici Radio-Canada Télé, TVA, Noovo and Télé-Québec. Some local advertising is aired and stations produce local newscasts, but all four networks otherwise air virtually identical schedules throughout Quebec, with the network signals being essentially the output of their Montreal flagships. Local stations affiliated with the networks are located in each of the 10 television markets of Quebec: Montreal, Quebec City, Gatineau–Ottawa, Sherbrooke, Saguenay, Trois-Rivières, Rivière-du-Loup, Rimouski, Abitibi-Témiscamingue, and Carleton-sur-Mer.

TVA is by far the most watched network: in fall 2006, it held 28% of the Quebec francophone primetime television audience, compared to Radio-Canada's 19% and Noovo's 14%.

Given the predominantly French-speaking population, only CBC, the English-language television service (CBMT-DT) funded by the government of Canada, is available over the air throughout the province. Montreal has local owned-and-operated stations of CTV (CFCF-DT), Global (CKMI-DT), and Citytv (CJNT-DT), Canada's three main English-language networks, while Gatineau receives all three networks as part of the Ottawa media market; Global is also available over-the-air in Quebec City and Sherbrooke through rebroadcasters of the Montreal station.

=== Cable television ===
Quebec has the lowest cable television-satellite television penetration rates in Canada, with 85.7% of Quebecers having cable television, as of 2006.

Vidéotron and Cogeco are the largest cable companies in Quebec, although a large number of independent cable companies exist. These compete against satellite companies Bell Satellite TV and Shaw Direct, as well as Bell's IPTV service Bell Fibe TV.

== The industry ==
There are two primary television seasons of approximately 13 weeks each with the first being a fall season running from the beginning of September to December and, then, a winter season running from January to April. It is during these two periods that the majority of new domestic series air.

Nearly all Quebecois television outlets are owned by six companies: the federally owned Société Radio-Canada, the provincially owned Société de télédiffusion du Québec, and private companies Groupe TVA, Corus Entertainment, Rogers Sports & Media, and Bell Media. These companies produce programming themselves or, more commonly, by independent producers. Tax breaks provided to independent producers have increased their workload, although the two largest networks produce a large amount of programming themselves.

Television production is centred in Montreal, where Radio-Canada and TVA have their large studio complexes and where most other independent studio facilities exist. A small amount of national programming is produced in Quebec City, in accordance with the licenses of the broadcast networks.

The French-language television industry in Canada uses much more original, domestic productions than English-language outlets. It also cooperates with European French-language television networks. As French-language stations do not compete with U.S. stations, and viewers are relatively uninterested in dubs of U.S. imports, there is a larger incentive to invest in original dramas and entertainment programming catered towards the captive Quebecois audience. In 1970 only two of the 15 most popular programs on Quebec television were not made in Canada. Unlike English-language channels, the most popular programs were téléromans. As of 2003 the top ten shows were written and created by Quebecers. The Quebec television industry produced two and one half times more TV series per capita than American networks, and domestic dramas were four times as profitable as American imports.

Because of the large domestic industry, Quebecois television has been described as having an insular "star system" that favours local talent. Personalities may frequently appear across different programs, and an extensive network of local celebrity news outlets cover them. Montreal Gazette media writer Steve Faguy found that there were at least 40 different Quebecois programs with formats dependent on celebrity guests (either as a participant or interview subject). In April 2016, during an interview on Radio-Canada's Tout le monde en parle, Quebecois musician Pierre Lapointe criticized the lack of diversity in the personalities seen on Quebecois television, which he described as a "culture of emptiness". Lapointe explained that "I'm sick of always seeing the same faces, and I'm one of those faces." The episode aired against the 2016 Artis Awards on TVA, which featured many of the same nominees and winners as the previous year's edition.

== History ==
Television began in Quebec (and in Canada) on September 6, 1952, with the launch of CBFT in Montreal, the first station in what would become Radio-Canada's television network. Borrowing the technical standards and frequency plan from television in the United States, the station broadcast on the lowest channel, channel 2. Though initially bilingual, carrying programming from sister broadcaster CBC as well, the network would hold a monopoly on French-language television during all of the 1950s.

This "golden age" would end with a producers' strike at Radio-Canada in December 1958. The strike would lead one popular television host, René Lévesque, to launch a career in politics, one that would lead him to found the Parti Québécois and, later, nine-years as the Premier of Quebec.

In 1961, Télé-Métropole in Montreal signed on the air with decidedly populist programming. Known as le 10 for its channel number, it was first private and independent French-language television broadcaster, the station would become the backbone of what is now the largest and highest-rated network in Quebec. In 1971, the network was formalized and given a name: TVA. By the early 1980s, its broadcast coverage reached nearly the entire province.

Colour began to be introduced in the 1960s, and by the end of the decade, unique cable television programming began with the introduction of télévision communautaire, the community channel.

Radio-Québec, now Télé-Québec, began in 1972, creating a third network, focusing on cultural and educational programming; first, its programming only appeared on cable, three years later, it began broadcasting as Montreal's first UHF station.

In the following years, additional Quebec cable networks appeared: TVSQ, covering sports, and surpassed in 1988 by RDS; TVJQ, with children's programming, later becoming Le Canal Famille, and now VRAK.TV; the TEQ, carrying an assortment of ethic programming, and now CJNT-TV; and TVFQ-99 (now TV5 Québec Canada).

In 1986, Télévision Quatre-Saisons, later V, now Noovo, launched as the newest television network, and the first to be distributed by satellite. With stations in Montreal and Quebec City, its reach was extended with partnerships with Radio-Canada affiliates elsewhere in the province, creating what is known as a twinstick.

At the same time, expansion of the number of cable channels continued: MusiquePlus (now Elle Fictions) in 1986; MétéoMédia in 1987; Réseau de l'information (now ICI RDI) and Canal D in 1995; MusiMax (now simply known as Max), Canal Vie, Télétoon, and Le Canal Nouvelles in 1997; Évasion, Historia, Séries+ (now SériesPlus) and Canal Z (later renamed as Ztélé; now simply known as Z), in 2000; and ARTV (now Ici ARTV) in 2001.

In the middle of the decade, as the growth of digital cable expanded, digital-only cable channels began to appear; today they include such channels as AddikTV, Argent, CASA, Cinépop, MOI ET CIE, Prise 2, RDS2, RDS Info, Télétoon Rétro, TVA Sports and Natyf TV.

== See also ==
- Culture of Quebec
- List of Quebec media
- List of Quebec television series
- List of Quebec television channels
- Culture of Canada
- Television in Canada
