= List of Quebec television channels =

This is a list of Quebec television channels.

== French broadcast networks ==
- CFTU-DT (Canal Savoir)
- Ici Radio-Canada Télé
- Noovo
- Télé-Québec
- TVA (Quebecor)

== English broadcast channels ==
Quebec is predominantly francophone, with its anglophone minority centred primarily around the city of Montreal. Accordingly, Quebec has only one station affiliated with each of Canada's major English-language broadcast networks.

- CBMT-DT (CBC Television)
- CFCF-DT (CTV)
- CJNT-DT (Citytv)
- CKMI-DT (Global)

== French Cable/Digital/Pay TV ==
- Addik (formerly Mystère) (Quebecor)
- Canal de l'Assemblée nationale
- Canal D
- Canal Indigo (Quebecor)
- Le Canal Nouvelles
- Canal Vie
- Casa (Quebecor)
- Cinépop
- Elle Fictions (formerly MusiquePlus)
- Évasion (Quebecor)
- Historia
- Ici ARTV
- Ici Explora
- Ici RDI
- Investigation
- Max (formerly MusiMax)
- MétéoMédia
- Prise 2 (Quebecor)
- Qub (Quebecor)
- Réseau des sports (RDS)
- RDS Info
- SériesPlus
- Super Écran
- Télétoon
- Témoin (formerly Mlle and Moi et Cie)
- TV5 Québec Canada
- Unis
- Z

== See also ==
- List of Canadian television channels
- List of Quebec television series
- List of Quebec media
- Lists of television channels
- Television of Quebec
