= Quebecor =

Canadian media and telecom conglomerate

Quebecor Inc.

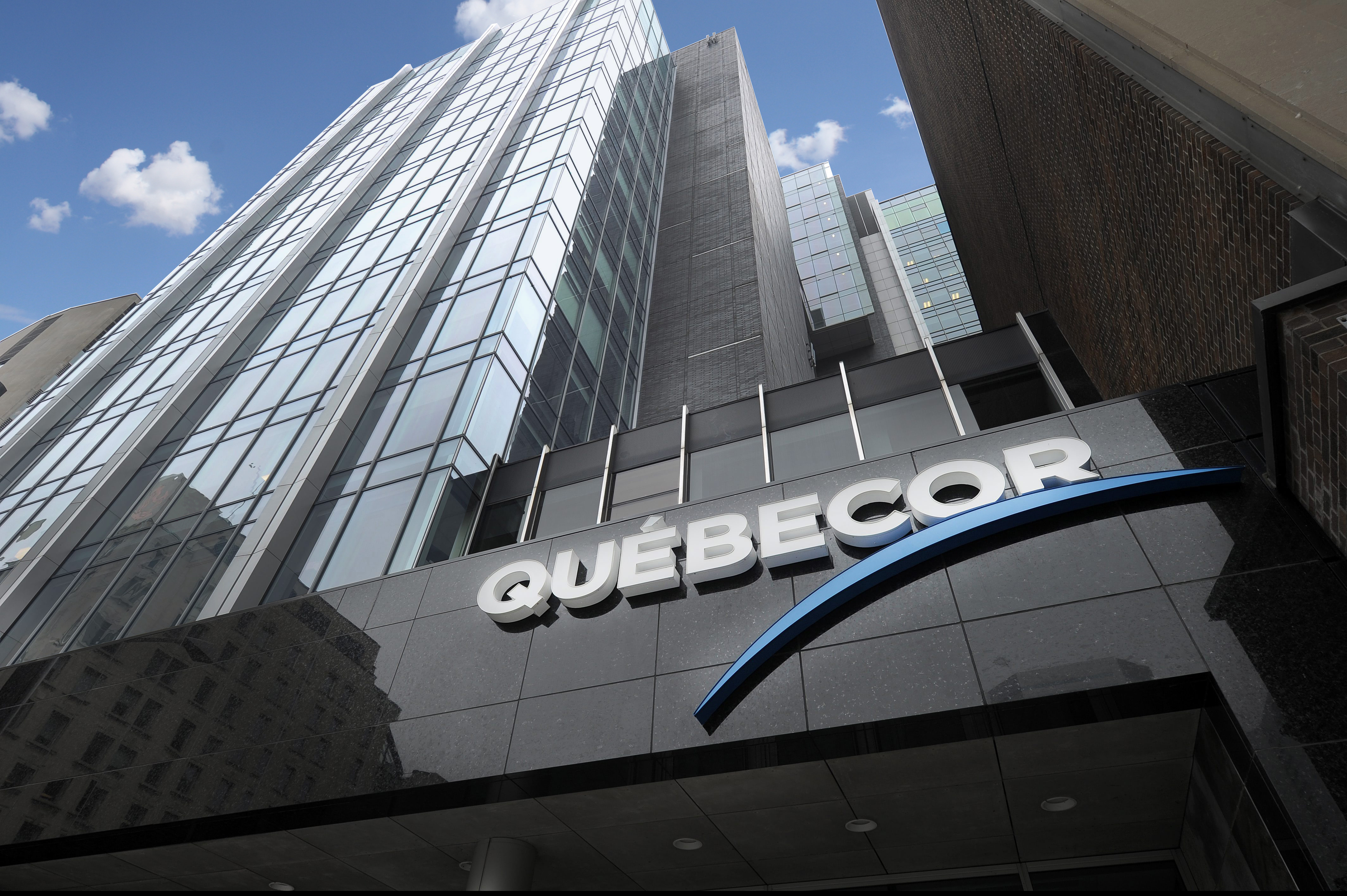
- Quebecor Inc.'s headquarters in 2015
- Native name: Québecor Inc.
- Type: Public
- Traded as: TSX: QBR.A; TSX: QBR.B; S&P/TSX Composite Component
- Industry: Telecommunications, Diversified media and broadcasting
- Founded: 1965; 61 years ago
- Founder: Pierre Péladeau
- Headquarters: 612 Saint-Jacques St. Montreal, Quebec; H3C 4M8, Canada
- Area served: Most of Canada through various subsidiaries
- Key people: Pierre Karl Péladeau (CEO, president and chairman, majority shareholder)
- Services: Advertising; Marketing; Publishing
- Revenue: ▲CA$4.532 billion (Fiscal Year Ended 31 December 2022)
- Operating income: ▲CA$810.1 million (Fiscal Year Ended 31 December 2022)
- Net income: ▲CA$596.7 million (Fiscal Year Ended 31 December 2022)
- Total assets: ▼CA$10.625 billion (Fiscal Year Ended 31 December 2022)
- Total equity: ▲CA$1.357 billion (Fiscal Year Ended 31 December 2022)
- Owner: Pierre Karl Péladeau (majority shareholder) through Les Placements Péladeau inc. (74.13%)
- Number of employees: 8,832 (2022)
- Divisions: Le SuperClub Vidéotron; Groupe TVA; Vidéotron; VMedia
- Subsidiaries: Quebecor Media
- Website: www.quebecor.com

Quebecor Inc. is a Canadian diversified media and telecommunications company serving Quebec based in Montreal. It was spelled Quebecor in both English and French until May 2012, when shareholders voted to add the acute accent, Québecor, in French only.

The company was founded in 1965 by Pierre Péladeau and remains run by his family. Quebecor Inc. owns Quebecor Media and formerly owned the printing company Quebecor World.

== History ==
In November 2026, Quebecor made an unsolicited bid to purchase Telus in a deal worth $22 billion.

== Assets ==
=== Telecommunications ===
- Vidéotron
  - illico TV (channel 900)
  - illico Digital TV (Cable TV provider)
  - Club illico (SVOD service)
  - Vrai (unscripted SVOD service)
  - Helix TV app
  - Canal Indigo (pay-per-view and NVOD channel; bilingual with English- and French-language services)
  - Fizz (internet and cellular provider)
  - Vidéotron Business
    - Fibrenoire
  - MAtv (community channels)
  - Helix (internet and IPTV provider)
  - Le SuperClub Vidéotron (video rental chain)
    - Microplay (video game retail)
- SETTE Postproduction
- VMedia (Toronto, Ontario)
- Freedom Mobile

=== Media ===
- Groupe TVA
  - TVA
    - CFTM-DT Montréal
    - CFCM-DT Quebec City
    - CHLT-DT Sherbrooke
    - CHEM-DT Trois-Rivières
    - CJPM-DT Saguenay
    - CFER-TV Rimouski
  - addikTV
  - Casa
  - Prise 2
  - Yoopa
  - Témoin
  - Évasion
  - Zeste
  - TVA Sports
  - TVA+ (video on demand and catch-up TV)
  - TVA Publications (magazines)
    - 7 Jours
    - TV Hebdo
    - Recettes du Québec
    - Échos Vedettes
    - Cool!
    - Clin d'œil
    - Star Système
    - Coup de Pouce
    - Canadian Living
    - Espaces
    - Échos Vedettes
    - DH
    - Les Idées de ma maison
    - Style at Home
    - Dernière Heure
    - Good Times Magazine
    - La Semaine
      - La Semaine Pratique
      - La Semaine Santé
      - La Semaine Extra
      - La Semaine Téléromans
      - La Semaine Cuisine
    - Pool Pro
    - Messageries Dynamiques (distribution)
  - MELS Studios (film and television production services)
  - Incendo Media
  - TVA Films (theatrical film and home video distribution)
  - TVA Nouvelles (news source)
    - Le Canal Nouvelles (LCN)
- Quebecor Content (television content production)
- Le Journal de Montréal (Montréal newspaper)
- Le Journal de Québec (Quebec City newspaper)
- 24 Heures (free newspaper)
- J5 mobile app
- QUB Radio (online radio and podcast platform)
- QUB Musique (music streaming platform)
- NumériQ
  - Billie
  - En 5 minutes
  - Le Sac de chips
  - Pèse sur Start
  - Porte-monnaie
  - Silo 57
  - TABLOÏD
  - Le Guide de l’auto
- Groupe Livre Québecor Média (book publishing)
  - Groupe Sogides (general literature)
    - Groupe Homme
      - Les Éditions de l'Homme
      - Le Jour Éditeur
      - Les Éditions La Griffe
      - Les Éditions Petit Homme
      - Juniper Publishing (English-language publishing)
    - Groupe Charron Éditeur
      - Éditions La Semaine
      - Recto-Verso Éditeur
    - Groupe Ville-Marie Littérature
      - Éditions VLB
      - Éditions de l'Hexagone
      - Les Éditions du Journal
      - Éditions TYPO
      - Les Éditions de La Bagnole
    - Groupe Librex
      - Éditions Libre Expression
      - Éditions Stanké
      - Les Éditions Publistar
      - Éditions Trécarré
      - Éditions Logiques
  - Les Éditions CEC (school books)
  - Messageries ADP (distribution)
- Quebecor Advertising Sales & Marketing
- Quebecor Out of Home
- Mirabel Printing (newspaper printing)
- Agence QMI (press agency)

=== Sports and entertainment ===
- Videotron Centre (indoor arena)
- Les Disques Musicor (record label)
- Audiogram (record label)
  - Éditorial Avenue (music publishing)
- Gestev (events management)
- Blainville-Boisbriand Armada
- Quebec Remparts

== Sponsorship ==
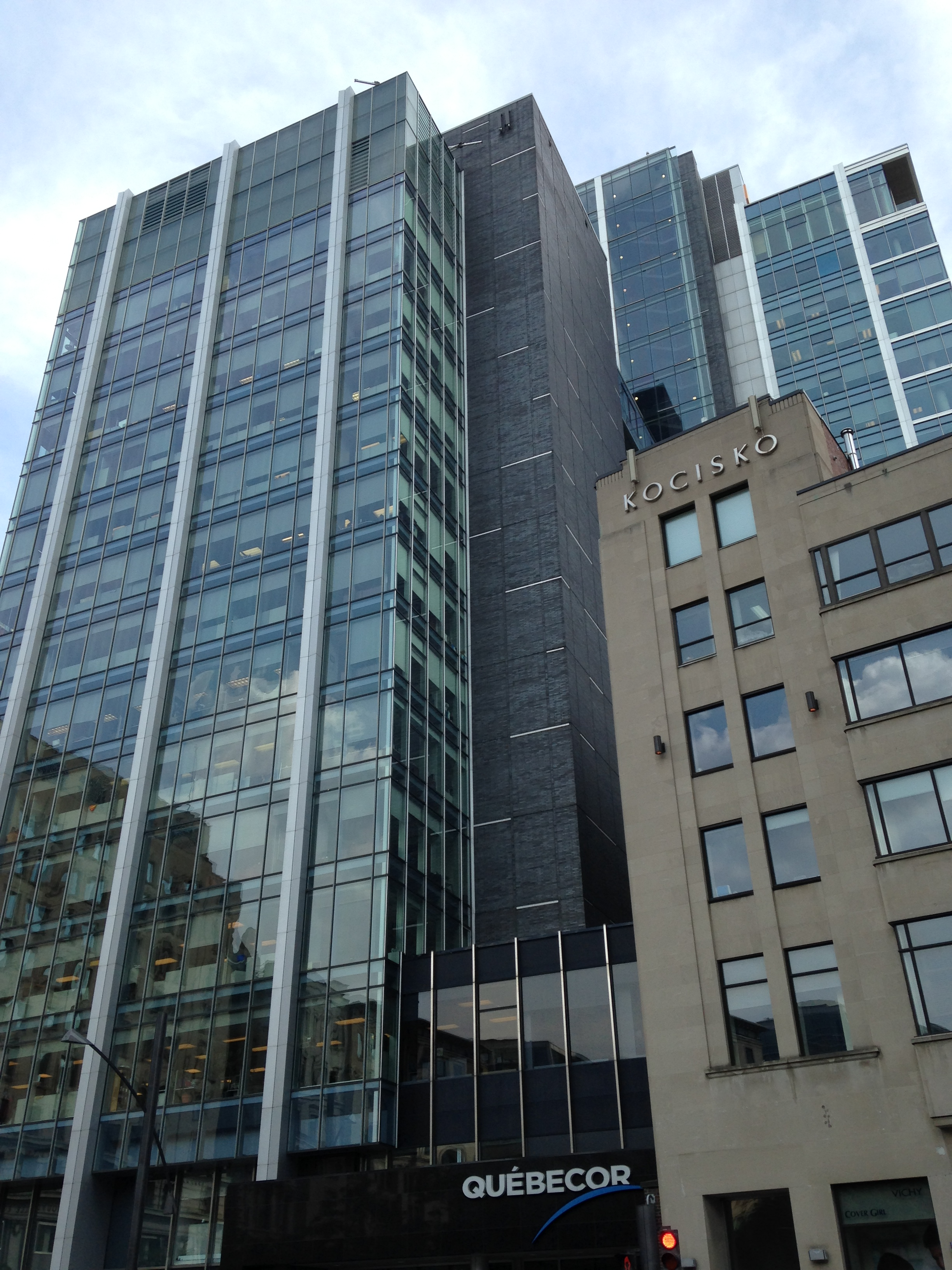
Quebecor headquarters in Downtown Montreal

In 2011, Quebecor launched TVA Sports, a French-language sports television network.

The same year, it bought the management and naming rights of the Videotron Centre, an indoor arena in Quebec City that opened in 2015.

In 2014, the company purchased the Quebec Remparts of the QMJHL.

In 2015, Quebecor submitted an application for an National Hockey League expansion franchise in Quebec City. The application underwent two phases of league scrutiny with an anticipcated decision in early 2016. However, a year later, the league "deferred" the bid.

== Corporate governance ==
Former Prime Minister of Canada Brian Mulroney served as chair of the board before his death in February 2024.

Current members of the board of directors of Quebecor Inc. are: Françoise Bertrand, Jean La Couture, Sylvie Lalande, Pierre Laurin, A. Michel Lavigne, Geneviève Marcon, and Normand Provost.

== See also ==
- Media ownership in Canada
- Charles-Albert Poissant
