= TVA (Canadian TV network) =

Privately owned French-language television network in Canada

- Current logo, since November 11, 2020
- Type: Terrestrial television network
- Country: Canada
- Broadcast area: Quebec (province-wide); Nationwide
- Headquarters: Montreal, Quebec

Programming
- Language: French
- Picture format: 1080i HDTV

Ownership
- Owner: Quebecor Media
- Parent: Groupe TVA

History
- Founded: April 14, 1963; 63 years ago
- Launched: September 12, 1971; 55 years ago

Links
- Website: tvaplus.ca (in French)

TVA is a Canadian French-language terrestrial television network founded in 1971 and owned by Groupe TVA, a publicly traded subsidiary of Quebecor Media.

Headquartered in Montreal, the network only has terrestrial stations in Quebec. However, parts of New Brunswick and Ontario are within the broadcast ranges of TVA stations, and two TVA stations operate rebroadcasters in New Brunswick. Since becoming a national network in 1998, it has been available on cable television across Canada.

TVA is short for Téléviseurs associés (roughly translated to "Associated Telecasters"). This reflects the network's roots as a cooperative.

== Overview ==
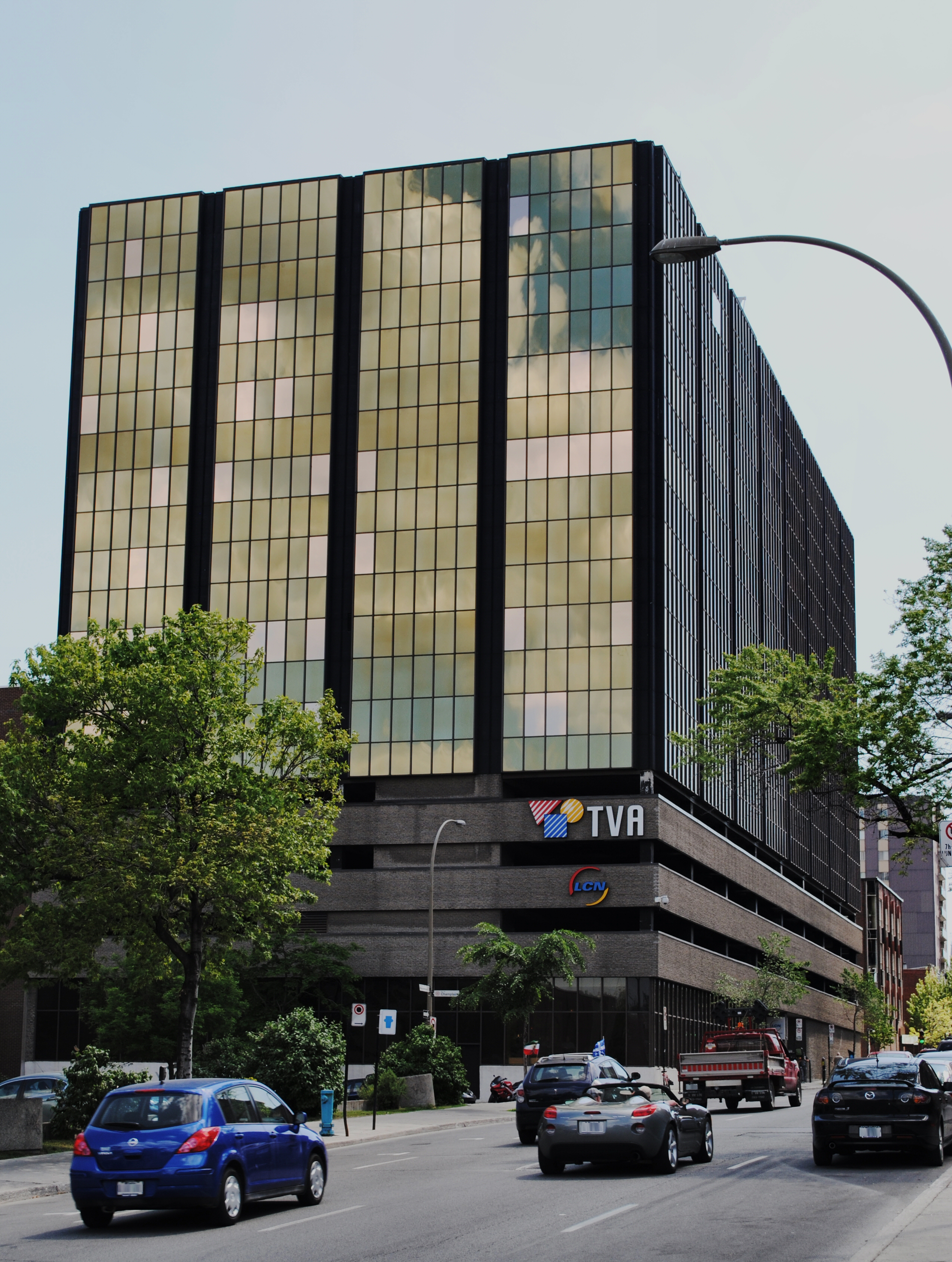
TVA's offices in Montreal where local station CFTM and its owner have been headquartered from October 1975 to May 2025

TVA traces its roots to 1963, when CJPM-TV in Chicoutimi, a station only a few months old and in need of revenue, began sharing programs with the largest privately owned francophone station in Canada, CFTM-TV in Montreal. They were joined by CFCM-TV in Quebec City in 1964 after CFCM lost its Radio-Canada affiliation to newly-launched CBVT. While the three stations shared programs for many years, it was not until September 12, 1971, that the informal link became a proper network, TVA, with CFTM as the flagship station. The network began the first private French-language network news service in Canada in 1972. Between 1973 and 1983, seven more stations joined the network.

When the network was formally organized in 1971, its affiliates ran it as a cooperative, much like CTV operated for many years. In 1982, the cooperative became a corporation with the station owners as shareholders.

For many years, TVA's schedule was very similar to that of what CTV offered before Baton Broadcasting took over the network in that it did not have what could be called a main schedule aside from news. For instance, Pathonic Communications, which owned the TVA affiliates in Quebec City, Sherbrooke, Trois-Rivières and Rimouski and provided programming to the affiliates in Rivière-du-Loup and Carleton, offered programming that was different from that offered on CFTM. The differences were enough that Sherbrooke's CHLT-TV, whose over-the-air signal reached Montreal, was carried on Montreal cable systems well into the 1980s. However, CFTM dominated the network to an even greater extent than Toronto's CFTO-TV dominated CTV, contributing as much of 90% of the network's programming.

In 1989, Télé-Metropole, which owned CFTM and CJPM, bought out Pathonic. The other station owners sold the outstanding shares of the network in 1992. Nine years later, Quebecor became owner of TVA.

TVA also owns Le Canal Nouvelles (LCN), Canada's only private French-language headline-news channel. When TVA completes its broadcast day, the TVA stations simulcast LCN until TVA's next broadcast day begins. As well, the company owns a magazine publishing division unit, a film production and distribution house, and a number of other Internet and cable properties, many of which are often used to cross-promote TVA series and events.

For many years, TVA's reach outside Quebec was only a fraction of that of Radio-Canada. The only stations with significant viewership outside Quebec were CHOT-TV of Hull (now part of Gatineau), CIMT-TV of Rivière-du-Loup and CHAU-TV of Carleton-sur-Mer. CHOT also serves Ottawa and has been available on most cable systems in Northeastern Ontario since the early 1980s, owing to that region's large Franco-Ontarian population. CIMT and CHAU both operate rebroadcasters in New Brunswick, and CHAU's main transmitter covers portions of the province as well. Between them, CIMT and CHAU provide nearly all of New Brunswick with TVA service. However, TVA did provide a cable feed known as TCTV starting in 1981, consisting of most of CFTM's programming and local news from other TVA stations.

In 1998, the Canadian Radio-television and Telecommunications Commission made it compulsory for all cable systems in Canada to carry a TVA station, in order to give Canada's francophone minority communities a second French-language programming choice. The station offered is usually the network's flagship, CFTM. However, some cable companies in Eastern and Northern Ontario continue to offer Gatineau's CHOT, while most New Brunswick cable companies still carry CIMT or CHAU.

TVA also provides a time-shifted feed for cable companies in Western Canada. However, this feed is just an electronic delay of CFTM's programming, rebroadcast three hours later in Pacific Time to viewers in Western Canada through a separate feed.

Although TVA is a full-fledged network, its network feed is basically a retransmission of CFTM, with opt-outs by local affiliates for local news, commercials and locally produced programming. While this allows TVA to air more network programming than any other Canadian network, it also means that CFTM usually cannot interrupt its programming for news or weather bulletins in Montreal without interrupting the entire network.

== Other services ==
In 2004, TVA's parent Groupe TVA and fellow Quebecor subsidiary Sun Media jointly acquired CKXT-TV in Toronto, an independent station once known as Toronto One under its previous owner, Craig Media, in 2004. The company's first English-language television station, it continued to be run as an independent station, not as a TVA affiliate. It was rebranded "Sun TV", after Sun Media's local newspaper, the Toronto Sun. In early 2005, TVA confirmed to The Globe and Mail that it would continue to look for other expansion opportunities in English Canada, but no further purchase announcements have been made by the company. On April 18, 2011, CKXT-TV began to simulcast the programming of a new news channel, Sun News Network, considered to be an English version of LCN. CKXT ceased operations on November 1, 2011, and the Sun News Network continued only on cable and satellite television providers until being discontinued in 2015.

Groupe TVA also operates a number of specialty channels, including addikTV, Casa, Évasion, LCN, Moi et Cie, Prise 2, QUB, and TVA Sports. The company previously operated kids' channel Yoopa from its launch in April 2010 until its demise in January 2024. Groupe TVA was also a majority owner of The Cave (now History2), which it co-owned with Shaw Media; it also equally owned Mystery TV (now Crime & Investigation) with Shaw Media, with Shaw Media being managing partner. TVA sold its share in both channels to Shaw in November 2011. The company launched an online radio network QUB Radio in 2018, and launched a TV simulcast in January 2024.

== Previous visual identities ==
TVA logo, 1971–1974

TVA logo, 1974–1984

TVA logo, 1984–1990

TVA shapes logo, 1990 – November 29, 2012.

TVA logo, November 29, 2012 – November 11, 2020

== Slogan ==
- Current: "TVA, on se reconnaît"
- Past:

"C'est vrai" (It's Real)
"Le sens de la télé" (The Meaning of Television)
"Le réseau d'ici" (The Network from Here)
"Le meilleur de la télé" (The Best of Television)
"Diffuseur d'émotions" (Broadcaster of Emotions)

== High-definition feed ==
On February 1, 2007, TVA launched an HD simulcast of its Montreal station CFTM-DT. TVA HD is available via satellite, digital cable or DTT. A simulcast of Quebec station CFCM-DT was launched in 2009, and a simulcast of Sherbrooke station CHLT-DT was launched July 19, 2010, initially available only on Vidéotron cable in their respective areas.

== Stations ==
Notes:

1) Italicized channel numbers indicate a digital channel allocated for future use by the Canadian Radio-television and Telecommunications Commission;
2) TVA's parent, Quebecor Media, owns a 45% stake of Télé Inter-Rives.

=== Owned-and-operated stations ===
| City of license | Station | Channel TV (RF) | Year of affiliation | Owned since |
|---|---|---|---|---|
| Montreal | CFTM-DT | 10.1 (10) | 1971 | 1971 |
| Quebec City | CFCM-DT | 4.1 (17) | 1971 | 1990 |
| Rimouski | CFER-DT | 11.1 (11) | 1978 | 1990 |
| Saguenay | CJPM-DT | 6.1 (46) | 1971 | 1982 |
| Sherbrooke | CHLT-DT | 7.1 (7) | 1974 | 1990 |
| Trois-Rivières | CHEM-DT | 8.1 (8) | 1976 | 1990 |

=== Affiliates ===
| City of license | Station | Virtual channel | Physical channel | Year of affiliation | Owner |
|---|---|---|---|---|---|
| Carleton-sur-Mer | CHAU-DT | 5.1 | 5 | 1980 (secondary); 1983 (primary) | Télé Inter-Rives |
| Gatineau/Ottawa | CHOT-DT | 40.1 | 40 | 1978 | RNC Media |
| Rivière-du-Loup | CIMT-DT | 9.1 | 9 | 1978 | Télé Inter-Rives |
| Rouyn-Noranda | CFEM-DT | 13.1 | 13 | 1979 | RNC Media |

=== Former affiliates ===
- CFVO-TV (September 1, 1974 – March 30, 1977) Owner: Coopérative de Télévision de l'Outaouais (Frequency now used by Télé-Québec)
- CBOFT-DT (secondary affiliate in 1977–1978. Primary affiliate is Ici Radio-Canada Télé)
