= QMI press agency =

The QMI Agency (French: Agence QMI), a division of Quebecor Media, is an integrated news agency. Founded in 2008, it offers services to media customers in Quebec.

== Journalism ==
QMI Agency engages in real-time news coverage for its subsidiaries and business partners.

The clients include, among others, Le Journal de Montréal, Le Journal de Québec, the 24H Montreal free newspaper and its various websites. QMI Agency has offices in Ottawa, Montreal and Quebec City.

QMI Agency also offered services to various platforms of the Sun Media subsidiary, and, from 2011 to 2015, the Sun News Network.

== Principal customers ==
- TVA Nouvelles
- Journal de Montréal
- Journal de Québec
- LCN
- 24H Montréal

== Criticism ==
Several journalists and communication professionals questioned the fact that the creation of the QMI Agency in 2008 coincided with the expiration of the collective agreement for the employees of the Journal de Montréal, just as negotiations were starting. The timing was likely to give rise to controversy.

== See also ==
- Québecor
- Journal de Montréal
- Pierre Karl Péladeau
- Le Journal de Québec
- Le Canal Nouvelles

== Bibliography ==
- Mathieu Lavallée, Quebecor : Péladeau se fait discret sur l’implantation de l’Agence QMI, on Les Affaires, 2010, (Consulted on 24 September 2014)
- Francis Vailles, La convergence au cœur des négos au Journal de Montréal, on La Presse, 2008, (Consulted on 24 September 2014)
- Paul Cauchon, Une agence de presse interne pour Québecor, on Le Devoir, 2009 (Consulted on 24 September 2014)
