= Crime & Investigation (Canadian TV channel) =

Canadian speciality television channel

- Country: Canada
- Broadcast area: Nationwide
- Headquarters: Toronto, Ontario

Programming
- Picture format: 1080i HDTV (downscaled to letterboxed 480i for the SDTV feed)

Ownership
- Owner: Corus Entertainment (Mystery Partnership) (Note: Branding licensed from A&E Networks.)
- Sister channels: History; History2; Lifetime; Showcase; Adult Swim; DejaView; MovieTime; W Network; CMT

History
- Launched: September 7, 2001; 24 years ago
- Former names: Mystery (2001–2007); Mystery TV (2007–2014)

Links
- Website: Crime + Investigation Canada

Crime & Investigation (stylized as Crime + Investigation) is a Canadian English language discretionary specialty channel owned by Corus Entertainment. It is a licensed version of A&E Networks' U.S. channel of the same name, and airs off-network reruns of police procedural dramas from the libraries of Global and Showcase, and true crime programming from the libraries of A&E Networks and Peacock.

The network was originally launched on September 7, 2001 as Mystery under a joint partnership between Canwest, Rogers Media and Groupe TVA, that is devoted to police drama to thrillers, suspense and reality programming. Through mulitiple ownership changes over the years, this channel was relaunched to its current name in 2014.

== History ==
The channel was licensed as 13th Street by the Canadian Radio-television and Telecommunications Commission (CRTC) on November 24, 2000, to Canwest (45.05%), Groupe TVA (45.05%) and Rogers Communications (9.9%). Before the channel's launch, both Canwest and Groupe TVA acquired Rogers' shares in the service equally. The channel was described as "a national English-language Category 1 specialty television service devoted to mystery and suspense programming. The service will nurture and encourage short form Canadian mysteries. It will provide a wide assortment of genre-specific programs including movies, television series, short films and documentaries that will focus exclusively on the delivery of entertaining programming on suspense, espionage and classic mysteries."

The channel was launched as Mystery on September 7, 2001. TVA, Canwest and Rogers also owned the same shares of its French counterpart, Mystère, which would become wholly owned by TVA before launch. The channel was rebranded as Mystery TV in 2007, though the channel was still referred to as "Mystery" on-air.

Original logo (2001–2007). This logo used a crescent device similar to Global like all other Canwest-owned television properties.

On October 27, 2010, Shaw Communications completed its acquisition of Canwest, giving it control of Canwest's 50% interest in Mystery TV. On December 22, 2011, Groupe TVA announced its intentions to sell its share of Mystery TV and The Cave to Shaw Communications, giving Shaw full control of these two channels. The deal was approved by the CRTC on April 25, 2012.

Logo as Mystery TV (2007-2014)

In June 2014, Shaw Media announced that Mystery TV, along with sister network Twist TV, would be rebranded as Canadian versions of Crime & Investigation and FYI, respectively, under a licensing agreement with A&E Networks. They were the fourth and fifth networks to be rebranded after History Television, Showcase Diva and The Cave were rebranded as Canadian versions of History, Lifetime and H2 respectively in 2012. It launched on November 3, 2014.
