= SériesPlus =

Canadian French television channel

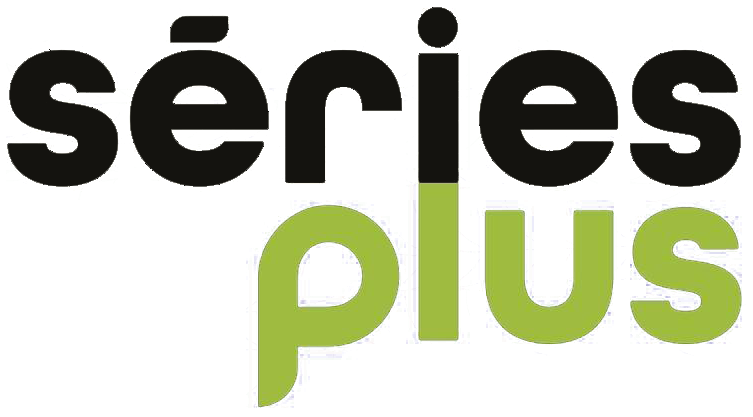
- Country: Canada
- Broadcast area: Nationwide
- Headquarters: Montreal, Quebec

Programming
- Picture format: 1080i HDTV (downscaled to letterboxed 480i for the SDTV feed)

Ownership
- Owner: Astral Media (2000–2013); Alliance Atlantis (2000–2008); Canwest (2008–2010); Shaw Media (2010–2013); Corus Entertainment (2013–present)
- Sister channels: Historia; Showcase; MovieTime; CMT; History; H2

History
- Launched: January 31, 2000; 26 years ago
- Former names: Séries+ (2000–2020)

Links
- Website: seriesplus.com (in French)

SériesPlus (formerly Séries+) is a Canadian French language specialty channel devoted to French-language scripted comedy and dramatic programming. The channel is owned by Corus Entertainment.

== History ==
On May 11, 1999, Alliance Atlantis Communications (AAC) and Premier Choix Networks (a division of Astral Media) were granted approval by the Canadian Radio-television and Telecommunications Commission (CRTC) to launch a French-language subscription network called Canal Fiction, described as a "service devoted to drama."

The channel was launched on January 31, 2000, as Séries+ at 6pm EST. On October 30, 2006, Séries+ launched a high definition simulcast.

On January 18, 2008, a joint venture between Canwest and Goldman Sachs Alternatives known as CW Media purchased AAC and gained AAC's interest in Séries+.

Original logo of Séries+ and the logo used for Séries+ HD, however with specific markings to identify it as the HD logo.

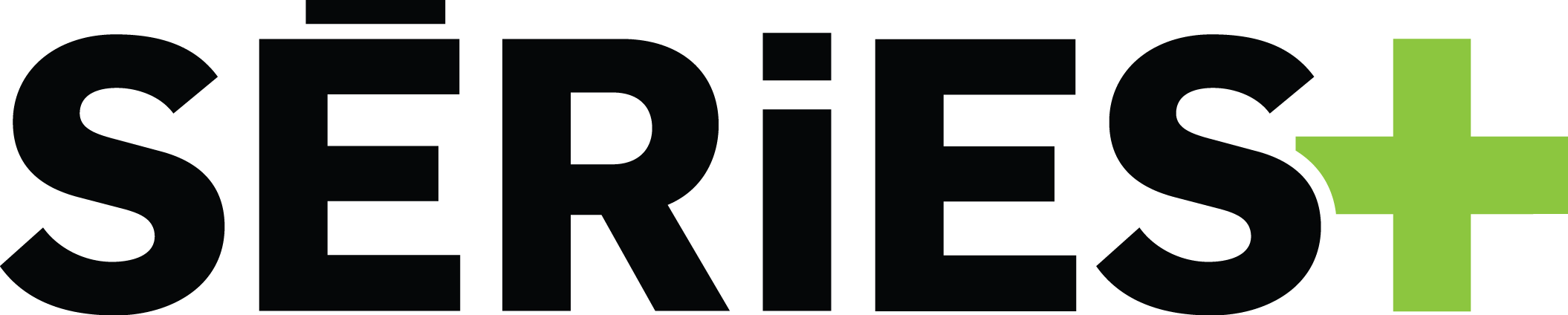
Second logo of Séries+.

On October 27, 2010, Shaw Communications completed its acquisition of Canwest and Goldman Sachs' interest in CW Media, giving it control of CW Media's 50% interest in Séries+.

On March 4, 2013, Corus Entertainment announced that it would acquire Astral Media's stakes in Séries+ and Historia, as well as several other properties, under separate transactions with the two companies. The purchase was tied to Bell Media's pending takeover of Astral Media; an earlier proposal had been rejected by the CRTC in October 2012 due to concerns surrounding its total market share following the merger, but was restructured under the condition that the companies divest certain media properties. In a separate deal, Corus also acquired Shaw's interests in Séries+ and Historia, giving it full ownership. The deals were approved by the CRTC on 20 December 2013 and Corus officially become the full owner of the channel on 1 January 2014.

On October 17, 2017, Bell Media announced its intent to acquire Séries+ and Historia from Corus for $200 million, pending regulatory approval. Corus cited the two channels as not being part of the company's "strategic priorities" at this time; the deal came shortly after an announcement that Corus no longer planned to commission original programs for the two channels. On 28 May 2018, both transactions were blocked by the Competition Bureau, as it violated a condition of the Astral Media purchase which bars Bell from re-acquiring any of the properties it divested for 10 years. As a result, Bell and Corus mutually agreed to shelve the sale.

On January 6, 2020, the channel underwent a rebranding, which also began to stylize its name as "SériesPlus".
