= Claude Poirier =

Canadian crime reporter (b. 1938)

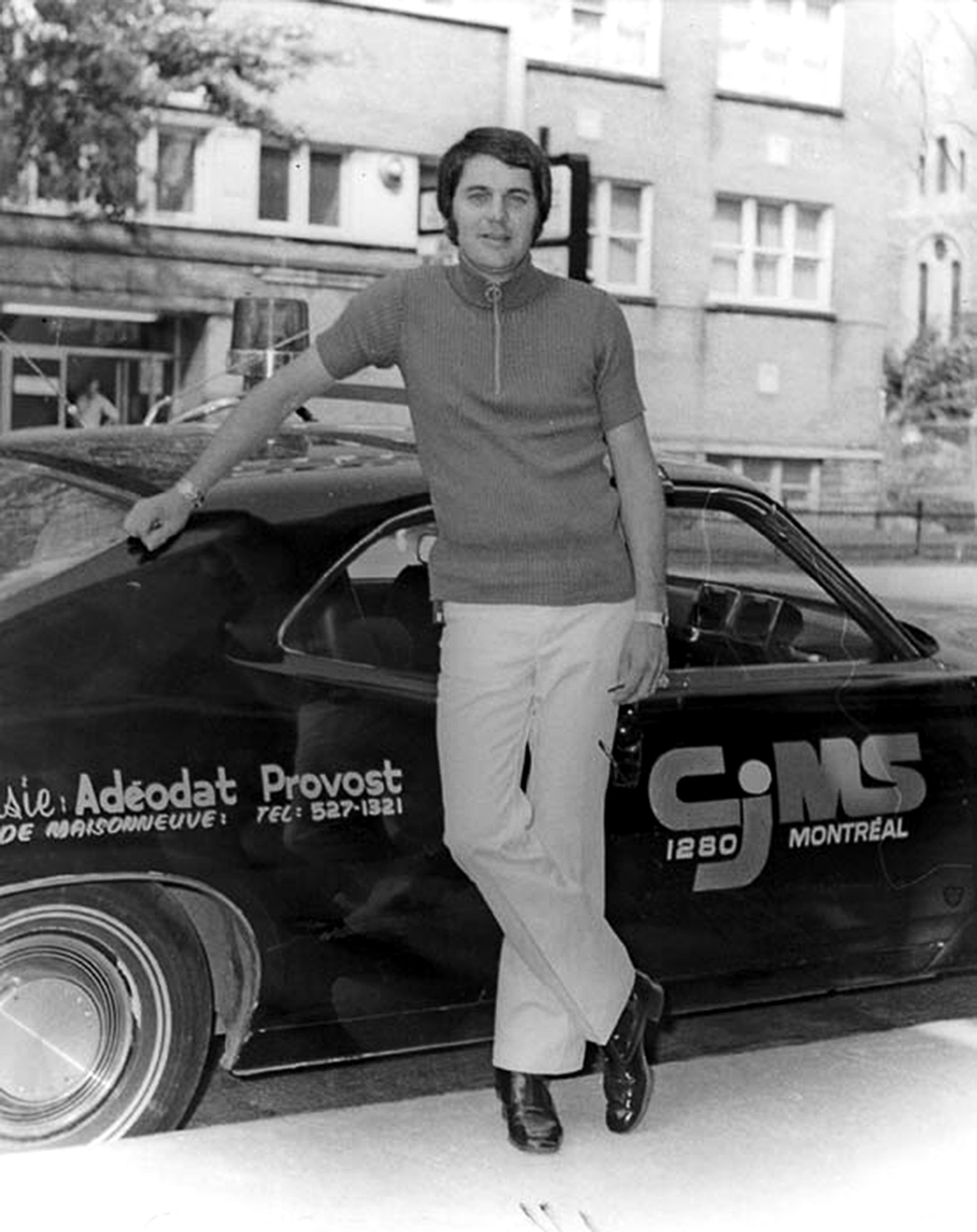
- Poirier in 1968
- Born: Joseph Edmour Claude Poirier; October 26, 1938 (age 87); Montreal, Quebec, Canada
- Occupations: Journalist, columnist, commentator
- Employer: TVA

Joseph Edmour Claude Poirier (October 26, 1938) is a Canadian journalist, columnist and negotiator. He is a long-time crime reporter for TVA, and is also known as a hostage negotiator.

== Life and career ==
Poirier's 60-year career as a crime reporter started in 1960 when he covered a bank robbery. He continued to do the job for several months without receiving a salary. Soon after, he reported on the assassinations of U.S. president John F. Kennedy and his brother Robert Kennedy as well as civil rights leader Martin Luther King Jr. In Quebec, he covered the kidnapping and subsequent murder of former Quebec Liberal Minister of Labor Pierre Laporte, by the FLQ militant group in 1970.

During his career Poirier has participated in numerous inquiries and trials as an expert and as a witness. He covered the widely publicized biker gang war that broke out in Quebec during the 1990s as well as trials in notorious murder or crime cases such as the trial of several biker gang members arrested during a province-wide police operation called "Printemps 2001" which significantly reduced their criminal activities around the province.

During hostage situations or similar events, criminals often asked police for a negotiation with Poirier. In August 2007, he was heavily involved over the well-publicized case of the disappearance of a 10-year-old girl, Cédrika Provencher, in Trois-Rivières, in a possible case of abduction.

Poirier received the Medal of Bravery from the Canadian government in 1977. The Quebec government has honoured him five times during his career.

Today, Poirier still comments on recent crime cases or cold ones on the TVA Nouvelles broadcast at 5:00 p.m. EDT on weekdays and during the LCN morning show. During his commentary, he also discusses the judicial system as well as federal or provincial laws related to crime measures such as gun control, prison sentences and related matters. He is also the host of Le Vrai Négociateur on LCN, a 60-minute show that discusses various cases involving the juridical system in Quebec or Canada as well as various crime or disappearance cases.

Poirier also played an important role in the production of the television series "Le Negociateur" which aired in 2005. The second season began on October 23, 2006, on the TVA television network. The series features well-known figures in Quebec culture such as Elvis Gratton star actor Julien Poulin, Frederick de Grandpré, Pierre Curzi, Les Boys actors Serge Thériault and Roc Lafortune, 2004 Star Académie winner Stephanie Lapointe and Guillaume Lemay-Thivierge.
