= TVA Sports =

Canadian sports network in French-language

- Country: Canada
- Broadcast area: National
- Headquarters: Montreal, Quebec

Programming
- Language: French
- Picture format: 1080i HDTV (downscaled to letterboxed 480i for the SDTV feed)

Ownership
- Owner: Groupe TVA

History
- Launched: September 12, 2011

Links
- Website: tvasports.ca

TVA Sports is a Canadian French-language sports specialty channel owned by the Groupe TVA, a publicly traded subsidiary of Quebecor Media. The channel is a general-interest sports network, and the first major competitor to RDS, the only other French-language sports channel in the country.

TVA Sports obtains much of its programming via sub-licensing and resource-sharing agreements with the English-language network Sportsnet and its owner Rogers Communications. As of the 2014–15 season, TVA Sports is the national French-language broadcaster of the National Hockey League, and also carries coverage of Toronto Blue Jays baseball and other events.

== History ==
TVA Sports' original logo, used until 2013.

The formation of TVA Sports was first announced at a press event in May 2011, where TVA announced its plans for the network, and some of its launch programming. TVA made numerous efforts to acquire content for the network in the years prior to the launch; including Quebecor's failed attempt to purchase a stake in the Montreal Canadiens, and the company's backing of a proposed National Hockey League expansion franchise in Quebec City—which included acquiring naming and management rights to a new arena in Quebec City built to potentially house a new or relocated NHL team.

On August 18, 2011, Rogers Media, owners of the English-language sports channel Sportsnet, announced that it would partner with TVA Sports to provide production resources, and sub-licensing of French-language rights to some of Sportsnet's event programming. Rogers had obtained CRTC approval for its own French-language sports network prior to the announcement.

The channel was launched on September 12, 2011.

Concurrently with the announcement that TVA would obtain French-language rights to the NHL through Rogers' 12-year deal with the league, a multiplex channel known as TVA Sports 2 was announced.

== Programming ==
Event programming aired by TVA Sports includes Toronto Blue Jays baseball (60 games during the 2012 season), as well as Toronto Raptors basketball games, plus other NBA matches, including the playoffs and Finals. TVA Sports aired French-language coverage of the 2014 Winter Olympics in Sochi through a sub-licensing deal with Radio-Canada. In 2013, again in tandem with Sportsnet, TVA Sports acquired French-language rights to the IndyCar Series.

In 2023, TVA Sports acquired the national French-language rights to Major League Baseball in Canada under a three-year deal, which includes a package of regular season games, and coverage of events such as the MLB All-Star Game and postseason. The package is in addition to TVA Sports' existing French-language rights to all Blue Jays games.

=== NHL coverage ===
On November 26, 2013, Rogers announced that it had reached a 12-year, $5.2 billion deal to become the exclusive national rightsholder for the National Hockey League, beginning in the 2014–15 season. Quebecor Media sub-licensed national French-language rights to the league for $110 million per season, making TVA Sports the official French-language broadcaster of the NHL. RDS retains regional rights to Montreal Canadiens and Ottawa Senators games not broadcast by TVA Sports. Former Montreal Canadiens goalie Jose Theodore joined the network as an analyst.

NHL games occupy a significant portion of TVA Sports' programming during the season, with a particular emphasis on the Canadiens and other teams popular in Quebec, such as the Boston Bruins, Colorado Avalanche, Ottawa Senators, Pittsburgh Penguins, and Toronto Maple Leafs. Under its initial deal, TVA Sports' flagship Saturday night broadcast, La super soirée LNH, aired 22 nationally-televised Canadiens games per season, along with a second game on TVA Sports 2. Between the two channels, a total of about 275 regular season games were broadcast per season. TVA Sports also aired the All-Star Game, Winter Classic, and Stanley Cup Playoffs.

On September 3, 2026, Rogers announced a 12-year renewal of the sublicensing agreement as part of its new contract beginning in the 2026–27 season; TVA Sports will carry a total of 350 regular season games per-season, including 32 nationally-televised Canadiens games, and events such as the All-Star Game and Winter Classic. During the Stanley Cup Playoffs, TVA Sports will hold French-language rights to all series broadcast by Sportsnet (as selected first- and second- series may now be broadcast by Prime Video in French under the new contract), and exclusive French-language rights to any first- or second-round series involving the Canadiens (even if it is picked by Prime Video).

=== Past programming ===
Prior to its full NHL rights package, TVA Sports carried a package of Ottawa Senators hockey games (25 games during the 2011–12 season). From its launch until 2015, TVA Sports carried French-language coverage of the UEFA Champions League and Ultimate Fighting Championship events. Rights to both have since been acquired by Bell Media and RDS.

TVA Sports was the regional broadcaster of CF Montréal of Major League Soccer from its establishment, and additionally the national French-language broadcaster of Major League Soccer from 2017. Both relationships ended in 2023, when rights to all matches moved to Apple's MLS Season Pass, and RDS acquired the national linear package.

TVA Sports held rights to the Canadian Hockey League sub-licensed from Sportsnet. In 2021, these rights moved to RDS.

== Carriage ==
Major carriers which added TVA Sports on launch included national satellite provider Shaw Direct, and regional cable provider Vidéotron (which is also owned by Quebecor Media, TVA's parent company). A carriage deal with Bell Satellite TV for TVA Sports was announced on November 22, 2011, part of a deal that also included Bell TV carriage of Mlle, Yoopa, and Sun News Network (Bell TV dropped the latter channel the previous May in a carriage dispute with Quebecor). Optik TV added TVA Sports on September 15, 2014 and Bell's FibreOP TV added it on September 24, 2014.

=== Carriage dispute with Bell ===
In 2017, Bell began a carriage dispute with Quebecor over TVA Sports, which included several invocations of the CRTC's "Final offer arbitration" (FOA) process; Quebecor attempted to negotiate a higher wholesale carriage fee for the channel (from $3.59 to $5.02 per-subscriber, which other providers, including Videotron, have agreed to), arguing that its recent content acquisitions and increasing viewership made TVA Sports roughly equivalent or better in value to television subscribers than RDS (which is owned by Bell through its broadcasting division Bell Media). Quebecor argued that RDS was receiving higher wholesale rates and better carriage because it is an older and established service, dating back to analog cable, and objected to the CRTC's arbitration process including "historic rates" as a factor in its decisions (which they felt perpetuated said bias).

Bell, however, felt that the fee increase was unjustified, as TVA Sports' expenses had remained roughly "constant" since 2015, and the network had "not materially increased" its value since its last carriage renewal (which did see an increase in carriage fees justified by its acquisition of national NHL rights). Bell argued that TVA Sports' ratings depended on "big ticket sports programming with high ratings volatility", while RDS had a stronger market share and larger rights portfolio (including regional French-language rights to the Canadiens and Senators). Bell also noted that much of TVA Sports' carriage was in bilingual or Anglophone markets, where the value of its programming is diluted by audience preferences towards English-language broadcasts (due to the smaller Francophone audience, French-language specialty channels are usually sold with lower per-subscriber rates outside of Quebec).

In a FOA case completed on January 17, 2018, the CRTC ruled in favour of Bell. Quebecor subsequently accused Bell TV of displaying "undue preference" to its co-owned networks in the packaging of its services. In a complaint with the CRTC, and a lawsuit in a Quebec court, Quebecor noted that TVA Sports was carried by Bell TV on its "Meilleur" ("Better") package, but that the Bell-owned RDS was carried on the entry-level "Bon" ("Good") package, which has a wider subscriber base. When originally negotiating with Bell to carry TVA Sports, Quebecor did mandate that it be carried on the same service tier as RDS's secondary feed RDS2, but did not mandate it be placed on the same tier as RDS. Quebecor had also noted that Bell did not show similar preference to RDS's English-language parent network TSN over the rival Sportsnet in its Anglophone packages.

The dispute intensified prior to the 2019 Stanley Cup playoffs: in a move reminiscent of carriage disputes in the United States, Quebecor began an advertising campaign in April 2019 to attack Bell, including websites in English and French (fairvalue.ca and justevaleur.ca) that publicized its arguments. The company estimated that it would receive at least $500,000 per-month in additional revenue if Bell carried TVA Sports on the same service tier as it does for RDS, and called upon the company to respect the "fair value" of its specialty channels. Bell has argued that this would increase the cost of the service. Quebecor also noted that Bell-owned channels (including former Astral networks) had a roughly 49% market share of subscriber revenue out of all Francophone specialty channels.

During the April 7, 2019 Montreal Canadiens game on TVA Sports (the final game of their season), and La Voix on TVA the following night, the channels ran on-screen snipes announcing that Quebecor would pull TVA Sports from Bell on April 10, 2019—the opening night of the playoffs, and that Bell was henceforth "punishing" its subscribers by not meeting its demands. It is against CRTC rules for the owner of a specialty channel to pull its signal from a television provider during a standstill in carriage negotiations (during which time the channel may continue to be carried under the existing contract terms until a decision is made). Bell issued a press release condemning Quebecor's "reckless campaign and illegal actions", and filed a request for another round of CRTC arbitration.

Nonetheless, Quebecor followed through with its threat and pulled TVA Sports from Bell on April 10, 2019 at 7:00 p.m. ET, just as coverage of the playoffs began. As compensation, Bell stated that it would offer Sportsnet, Sportsnet 360, and Sportsnet One free to all affected subscribers until the dispute is resolved, so that viewers would have access to the English-language broadcasts. The CRTC stated that it was "ready to use the means at its disposal" to enforce its regulations. On April 11, as Bell sought an injunction, Quebecor made an offer to restore the channel until April 23, amidst continued negotiations. However, Bell would only accept this offer if it were enforced via court order. The same day, TSN (the national English-language rightsholder of Major League Soccer) announced that it would add two additional Montreal Impact matches to its broadcast schedule in April, accompanied by a free preview of TSN, once again as an alternative to the French-language broadcasts on TVA Sports.

On April 12, 2019, the Quebec Superior Court granted Bell a temporary injunction ordering Quebecor to restore Bell's access to the TVA Sports signals by 6:00 p.m. that day, through at least April 23. A public hearing was held by the CRTC on April 17, 2019; Bell senior vice-president of regulatory affairs Robert Malcolmson stated that Quebecor's actions were illegal and "an affront to viewers, to the commission and the rest of the participants in the broadcasting system who play by the rules." He called for the CRTC to suspend TVA Sports' broadcast licenses through the end of June (ensuring that it would not be able to broadcast the remainder of the playoffs), if not revoke the license entirely. Malcolmson also expressed concerns that Quebecor could pull TVA Sports from Bell once again after the injunction expires on the 23rd. Quebecor CEO Pierre Karl Peladeau argued that they needed to be "equitably compensated" to ensure the survival of their networks, that current policies unfairly benefited the dominant Bell, and that the channel may be forced to cease operations entirely if it is unable to receive "reasonable" carriage fees that can cover its operating losses.

On April 18, 2019, the CRTC issued a mandatory order directing Quebecor not to pull TVA Sports' signals from Bell again, threatening that the channel's license would be suspended "for the duration of time that the signal is not provided", and that Quebecor could be held in contempt of court, if it illegally pulled the signal again. On April 26, 2019, Bell filed a lawsuit against Quebecor for $150 million, accusing the company of engaging in "monopoly behaviour" and using "diversionary tactics" rather than accept its offers to negotiate. In June 2019, the Federal Court of Appeal agreed to hear the Quebecor case.

On December 19, 2019, the CRTC ruled that Bell had given RDS undue preference in the packaging of its vertically-integrated television services, and ordered the company to submit a compliance plan to the commission by February 5, 2020.

== Channels ==
As a Category C service, TVA Sports is permitted to operate multiple feeds.

Channel	Launch date	Description and programming
TVA Sports	September 12, 2011	Main channel.
TVA Sports 2	September 14, 2014	Secondary national feed
TVA Sports 3	April 15, 2015	A temporary feed, which is used during the Stanley Cup Playoffs as an overflow channel.

Preceded by RDS	NHL French network broadcast partner in Canada; 2014–present	Incumbent
