= Télé-Québec =

Provincial public broadcaster in Quebec, Canada

- Type: Educational television network
- Country: Canada
- Broadcast area: Provincewide Quebec

Ownership
- Owner: Société de télédiffusion du Québec
- Parent: Government of Quebec

History
- Founded: February 22, 1968
- Launched: January 19, 1975

Links
- Website: www.telequebec.tv (in French)

The Société de télédiffusion du Québec (French: [sɔsjete də teledifyzjiɔ̃ dy kebɛk]; English: Quebec Television Broadcasting Corporation), branded as Télé-Québec (French: [telekebɛk]) (formerly known as Radio-Québec), is a Canadian French-language public educational television network in the province of Quebec. It is a provincial Crown corporation owned by the Government of Quebec. The network's main studios and headquarters are located at the corner of de Lorimier Street and East René Lévesque Boulevard in Montreal.

Télé-Québec is equivalent to Ontario's TVO and its French counterpart TFO, and British Columbia's Knowledge Network, and similar to the American Public Broadcasting Service (PBS) and its affiliated state networks, in that it is somewhat modest in scope, runs mostly educational or cultural programming and does not try to compete with privately owned television networks (such as TVA) or with Ici Radio-Canada Télé, the French-language service of the Canadian Broadcasting Corporation (CBC). However, unlike TFO and the anglophone educational networks, it runs commercials during its programming.

All programming on Télé-Québec is in French, although a few shows and movies are presented in the original language (predominantly English), with French subtitles.

Télé-Québec operates local offices in Val-d'Or, Trois-Rivières, Rimouski, Gatineau, Sept-Îles, Quebec City, Sherbrooke, Saguenay and Carleton-sur-Mer.

Télé-Québec is one of the partners in the TV5 Québec Canada and TV5Monde consortiums. It also had a 25% stake in the French-Canadian arts specialty channel, Ici ARTV, which it sold to the CBC in 2010.

== History ==
former logo, as Radio-Québec; 1968-1996

On April 20, 1945, the Legislative Assembly of Quebec, under the mandate of Premier Maurice Duplessis, passed a law allowing Quebec to create and run a public broadcasting network, as a provincial counterpart to the Canadian Broadcasting Corporation.

However, it never got beyond the planning stages until February 22, 1968, when the Daniel Johnson Sr. administration created a new public broadcasting agency, "Radio-Québec", under the auspices of the Ministry of Education. Shortly afterward, the first Radio-Québec program, a radio program on the history of Canada called En montant la rivière, was produced. Produced later that year was its first television program, Les Oraliens, where space aliens taught kids how to pronounce French words and phrases properly.

In 1969, a new law was passed by the National Assembly of Quebec, creating l'Office de radio-télédiffusion du Québec ("Quebec Office of Radio and Television Broadcasting"), where Radio-Québec was placed.

Radio-Québec began broadcasting on its own on November 5, 1972, as a cable channel, which broadcast evenings on community channels in Montreal and Quebec City, then expanded in 1973 to Hull, Gatineau and Sherbrooke. As a cable network, Radio-Québec was generally on the air weeknights from 8 pm to 10 pm. The network of over-the-air transmitters was launched on January 19, 1975, with the sign-ons of CIVM-TV in Montreal and CIVQ-TV in Quebec City, making its programming available to an even wider audience. In its early days after the terrestrial network began, Radio-Québec would provide week-delay videotapes of its programming line-up to cable systems in communities not served by a Radio-Québec station. Some Radio-Québec programs were also seen on most Radio-Canada stations, not only in Quebec but throughout Canada as well; this arrangement continued into the 1980s.

In 1977, Radio-Québec opened its third station, CIVO-TV in Hull, serving the greater Ottawa area—the station was built after acquiring the facilities of a failed TVA affiliate, CFVO-TV. That same year, Passe-Partout premiered.

Radio-Québec was off the air during most of 1978, due to a lockout of its employees in a labour dispute.

In 1979, Radio-Québec's agency was restructured as a provincial crown corporation, Société de radio-télévision du Québec ("Quebec Radio and Television Broadcasting Corporation"). The network had also adopted the slogan, L'autre télévision ("The other television"). From about 1980 to 1985, the Radio-Québec theme song that played when the station concluded its broadcast day was sung nightly by pop singer Veronique Beliveau who was also at the time the official face on television for the Simpsons department store chain in Quebec.

On January 1, 1985, Radio-Québec began providing its programming to its stations and cable systems via satellite, using Anik C-3. Also that year, the CRTC permitted Radio-Québec to show commercials during some of its programming, initially for a two-year trial run. This authorization became permanent—by the 2002–03 fiscal year, Télé-Québec's revenues from advertising would account for 45.8% of its total revenue.

In 1995, the Quebec government announced budget cuts for Radio-Québec, in which its budget was reduced by $10 million. That year, Radio-Québec president Jean Fortier announced that the network was virtually bankrupt. As a result, over 150 staffers were laid off (out of over 750 people employed), with plans for further layoffs to trim the employee count to 300 staffers. Programming produced in-house would either be cancelled or transferred to independent companies. In addition, the network would adopt the "Télé-Québec" name the following year, in 1996, with the crown corporation renamed as Société de télédiffusion du Québec. A proposal for the new Télé-Québec to carry strictly educational programming was never carried out. Instead, it retained its mixed educational-entertainment schedule.

The monetary shortfall was short-lived, as by 1997, Télé-Québec resumed productions on its own and increased its amount of original programming.

Since August 17, 2018, the children's programs have been branded as Squat for youths and Coucou for preschoolers, each with its own website and mobile app.

In June 2026, the Fréchette government announced plans to turn Télé-Québec into an incubator for new talent. Télé-Québec also plans to shift its target audience towards teenagers by embracing short-form content.

== Programming ==
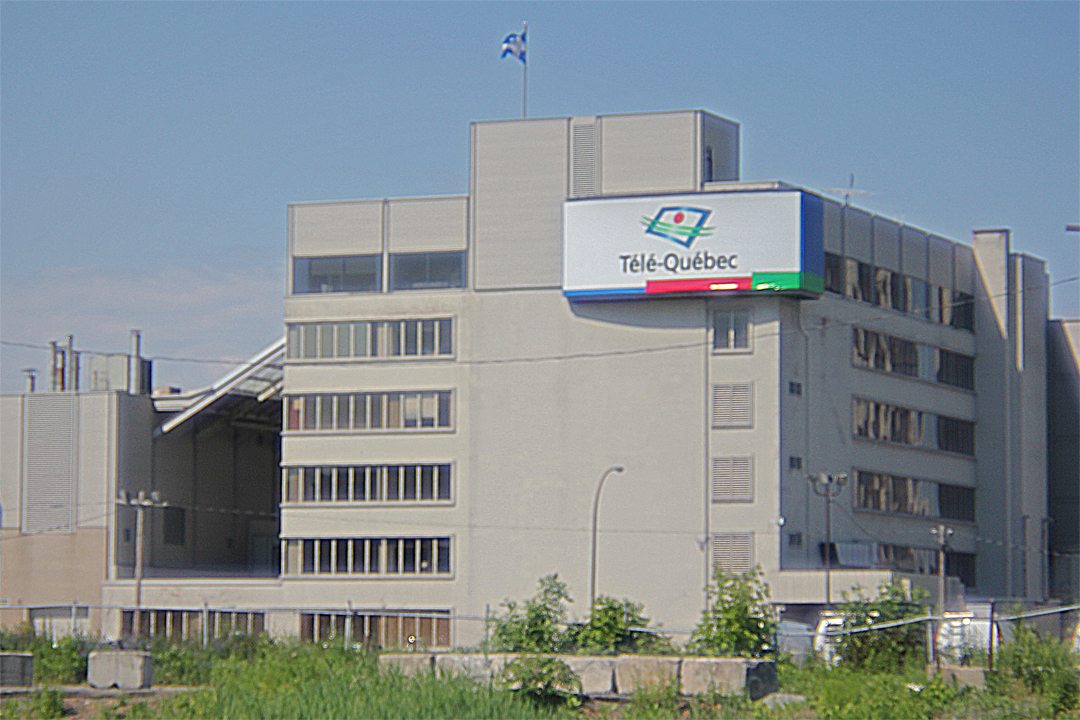
The former Montreal offices on Parthenais Street

Over 40% of Télé-Québec's programming is children's programming. In 2005, Ramdam was a popular show for 2- to 11-year-olds. Other children's shows have included Cornemuse, Zoboomafoo, Dora l'exploratrice, Bob le bricoleur, IDragon, Les Mélodilous, Le Petit tracteur rouge, and Toupie et Binou. For 6 to 8 year-olds, shows have included Macaroni tout garni, Nickelodeon's Rocket Power, Esprits-fantômes, and Le Petit roi Macius. Ramdam and Banzaï are both aimed at pre-teens (9 to 12) and ADN-X is a teen show that provides practical solutions to everyday problems.

Télé-Québec's cultural programming reflects Quebec's diverse cultural expression in fiction, songs, music, cinema, visual art, and drama. Télé-Québec shows such as Belle et Bum, M'as-tu lu? and Pulsart help to promote Quebec artists and creators and their works. Belle et Bum is a music show that invited 160 performers or groups in 2005–2006, who performed 230 songs by Quebec songwriters or composers. M'as-tu lu? is a book show that covers books of all genres and for all audiences; in 2005–2006, 260 books were presented, 124 of which were by Quebec authors. Pulsart is a magazine show on cultural activities taking place all over Quebec.

A new weekly cultural magazine-style show, Libre échange, deals with a range of different creative arts, including dance, cinema, literature, sculpture, painting, television, music, and theatre. As well, a new series of "living portraits" will profile notable living creators such as authors, filmmakers, architects, and thinkers.

Télé-Québec presents a range of films, including "auteur" films by notable directors, feature-length documentaries, premiere showings, and Quebec films. All films are shown without commercial interruptions, compared to most French-language TV channels in Canada. During the last five years, Télé-Québec showed over 959 hours of documentaries, which made up 18% of its programming. Documentary topics included socio-political, cultural, historical, scientific, and travel. Between 2000 and 2006, 137 documentaries and 39 series were produced.

Télé-Québec also hosts debate and discussion-oriented shows that allow for an exchange of ideas and perspectives on social and political issues. Points chauds is a show on international political issues. Méchant contraste! is a pan-Quebec magazine show on social, political, and economic issues. Dussault-Débat is a debate show.

As a community service, Télé-Québec has several shows that present a regional perspective, such as Méchant contraste!, À la di Stasio, les Francs Tireurs, M'as-tu lu?, Une pilule, and Pulsart. Télé-Québec also has an Internet strategy, as part of its educational and cultural mission. In 2003, the extremis.tv website won a Gémeaux prize for the best Internet site. In 2004, du missionarctique.tv won the same award. The website for the teen-oriented show ADN-X has interactive activities including a comic strip-creating activity.

=== Programming in English ===
The only regular Télé-Québec shows that were entirely in English were the weekday, hour-long, instructional program Quebec School Telecasts and its successor Quebec School Television. Quebec School Telecasts first aired on CBC Television outlets in Quebec in the early 1960s. Radio-Québec picked up the program in 1984 and aired it under that name until September 2, 1996. It was replaced on September 3, 1996, by Quebec School Television which aired on Télé-Québec until December 1999.

In 1985, Radio-Québec and TVOntario signed an exchange arrangement, in which English-language TVO programming would be seen on Radio-Québec, and Radio-Québec's French-language programming would be seen on TVO.

In 2018, English Language Arts Network (ELAN) filed an intervention to CRTC licence renewals for the service, seeking that Télé-Québec be required to devote 20% of its programming and budget to programs of interest to an anglophone, indigenous, and other visible minority communities of Quebec. The proposal called for at least 10% of this quota to be put towards English-language programming. The CRTC declined the request, stating that it was beyond the scope of licence renewal, and "should be the subject of a policy proceeding in which broadcasters as a whole are considered".

== Télé-Québec HD and digital conversion ==
Télé-Québec HD logo

On June 12, 2008, Télé-Québec launched an HD simulcast of its Montréal station CIVM-TV called "Télé-Québec HD". It signed on over the air on channel 27 (Virtual channel 17) from Olympic Stadium in Montreal in January 2009, making CIVM-DT the first educational television station in Canada to broadcast digitally. After the analogue shutdown and digital conversion in Canada, scheduled for August 31, 2011, CIVM-DT moved to channel 26.

A digital terrestrial television transmitter requested and authorized for construction in Quebec City for CIVQ-TV did not sign on until August 2010, weeks before the September 25, 2010, deadline to sign on or file an extension. That transmitter broadcasts from Édifice Marie-Guyart in downtown Quebec City on channel 25 (virtual channel 15). After the digital conversion in 2011, CIVQ moved its digital signal to channel 15.

Télé-Québec intended to convert all of its transmitters to digital by the digital transition deadline of August 31, 2011, including its transmitters that are not required to transition by this deadline.

== Stations ==
Télé-Québec's network consists of 12 stations and five repeaters, originating at CIVM-DT in Montreal.

Station	City of licence	TV	RF	ERP	HAAT	Transmitter Coordinates	First air date
CIVA-DT	Val-d'Or	12	12	22.0 kW	201.1 m (660 ft)	48°25′17″N 77°50′49″W	January 18, 1980
CIVA-DT-1	Rouyn-Noranda	8	8	19.0 kW	219.6 m (720 ft)	48°15′52″N 79°2′38″W	January 18, 1980
CIVB-DT	Rimouski	22	22	136.0 kW	460.5 m (1,511 ft)	48°28′2″N 68°12′39″W	November 3, 1981
CIVB-DT-1	Grand-Fonds (Note: Broadcast from Mont Grand-Fonds; serving La Malbaie and Baie-Saint-Paul.)	31	31	95.0 kW	508.0 m (1,667 ft)	47°46′47″N 70°9′8″W	1985
CIVC-DT	Trois-Rivières (Note: Originally broadcast from the old CBC Tower at Mont-Carmel until a plane crash on April 23, 2001.)	45	33	290.0 kW	398.1 m (1,306 ft)	46°29′33″N 72°39′7″W	October 6, 1981
CIVF-DT	Baie-Trinité (Note: Also covers Baie-Comeau.)	12	12	46 kW	148.2 m (486 ft)	49°23′28″N 67°28′15″W	November 15, 1982
CIVG-DT	Sept-Îles	9	9	19 kW	218.9 m (718 ft)	50°10′18″N 66°44′16″W	November 5, 1982
CIVK-DT	Carleton (Note: Signal also covers Campbellton, New Brunswick)	15	15	140 kW	459.0 m (1,506 ft)	48°8′8″N 66°6′58″W	1984
CIVK-DT-1	Gascons (Note: Signal also covers the Acadian Peninsula.)	32	32	180.0 kW	200.9 m (659 ft)	48°12′41″N 64°52′14″W	1984
CIVK-DT-2	Percé	40	17	0.6 kW	405.4 m (1,330 ft)	48°31′38″N 64°14′37″W	1984
CIVK-DT-3	Gaspé	35	35	0.55 kW	424.5 m (1,393 ft)	48°50′1″N 64°15′24″W	1984
CIVM-DT	Montreal (Note: Broadcasts from transmitter atop the Olympic Stadium tower; originally broadcast its analogue signal from Mount Royal.)	17	26	269 kW	170.6 m (560 ft)	45°33′28.48″N 73°33′6.39″W	January 19, 1975
CIVO-DT	Gatineau (Note: Broadcasts from Camp Fortune; was licensed to Hull prior to 2002.)	30	30	300.2 kW	358.0 m (1,175 ft)	45°30′9″N 75°50′59″W	August 15, 1977
CIVP-DT	Chapeau (Note: Signal also covers Pembroke, Ontario.)	23	23	0.758 kW	98.6 m (323 ft)	45°55′29″N 77°4′22″W	1981
CIVQ-DT	Quebec City (Note: Broadcasts from Édifice Marie-Guyart.)	15	15	194.0 kW	191.4 m (628 ft)	46°48′29″N 71°13′3″W	January 19, 1975
CIVS-DT	Sherbrooke (Note: Broadcast from Orford; signed on in early 1982 on channel 14; would move to channel 24 later that year.)	24	24	31 kW	598.3 m (1,963 ft)	45°18′43″N 72°14′30″W	February 26, 1982
CIVV-DT	Saguenay (Note: Broadcast from Mount Valin; was licensed to Chicoutimi prior to 2002.)	8	8	84.9 kW	593.8 m (1,948 ft)	48°36′7″N 70°49′48″W	November 1982

It can also be seen nationwide on Bell Satellite TV channel 138 and Shaw Direct channel 722. On terrestrial cable, however, it is generally seen only in Quebec and in communities in Ontario and New Brunswick which are within the broadcast range of a Télé-Québec transmitter. Outside of this area, few cable systems, such as MTS in Winnipeg, carry Télé-Québec in their digital tiers.

Télé-Québec (and its predecessor, Radio-Québec) was also assigned channel 2 in Rivière-du-Loup, channel 10 in Lithium Mines, and channel 21 in Mont-Laurier. As of 2009, service has yet to begin in these communities; in addition, it later lost its channel 2 slot at Rivière-du-Loup, after that channel was reallocated to Quebec City (CFAP-TV) and Rimouski (CJBR-TV). It is also unknown if the Lithium Mines transmitter was replaced by, or provided secondary service of, CIVA-TV, the Télé-Québec outlet serving nearby Val-d'Or.

== See also ==
- List of Quebec television channels
- List of Quebec television series
- Television of Quebec
- Culture of Quebec
