= TVA Films =

Canadian film and TV production and distribution company

- Formerly: Coscient Group; Motion International; TVA International
- Type: Private
- Industry: Film; Film distribution
- Founded: 1956
- Headquarters: Toronto, Ontario, Canada; Montreal, Quebec, Canada
- Parent: Quebecor Media
- Divisions: TVA (Canadian TV network)

TVA Films is a privately held Canadian film and television production and distribution company with headquarters in Montreal, Quebec and an extra in Toronto, Ontario. TVA Films is owned by Groupe TVA, a division of Quebecor Media.

The company made its origins in 1956 as Coscient Group by film and television producer Andre Larin. In 1990, the company started Motion International, and in 1994 expanded with the purchases of SDA Productions and Allegro Films Distribution. In 1996, the company had acquired the production and distribution divisions of Astral Communications, and it was absorbed into Coscient Group. In 1997, the company had purchased kiddie TV producer Owl Television, formerly owned by OWL magazine. In 1998, individual subsidiaries were merged into a single organization, temporarily using the Coscient name. In 1999, the Coscient branding has largely been phased out in favor of the Motion International branding.

In 2000, Groupe TVA purchased Motion International, a small film and television distribution company and it was renamed to TVA International. Two years later, it was renamed to TVA Films.
