= Poissant =

Poissant is a surname of French origin, often found in Canada. Notable people with the surname include:

- Charles-Albert Poissant (1925–2011), Canadian businessman, and philanthropist
- Claude Poissant (1955–2025), Canadian actor, screenwriter, and theatre director
- Didier Poissant (1923–2021), French sailor
- Jean-Claude Poissant (born 1960), Canadian farmer and politician
- Maurice Poissant (1883–1969), French politician
