= Paul W. Robertson =

Paul Robertson
- Born: December 19, 1954
- Died: September 2, 2014 (aged 59)
- Education: Richard Ivey School of Business
- Occupations: President of Shaw Media and group vice president of broadcasting at Shaw Communications
- Employer(s): Baton Broadcasting (1995-1997); Shaw Communications (1997-1999); Corus Entertainment (1999–2010); Shaw Media (2010–2014)

Paul William Robertson (December 19, 1954 – September 2, 2014) was a Canadian businessperson, media executive and producer known for his work in animated television and broadcasting. He died of pancreatic cancer on September 2, 2014.

== Career ==
Robertson held an honours degree in business administration from The Richard Ivey School of Business at the University of Western Ontario.

Robertson brought over 30 years of broadcasting and marketing experience to the operational oversight of the Global network and Shaw Media’s portfolio of 18 specialty channels. His previous roles included president of Corus Television, senior vice president of programming and marketing at CTV, president of Baton Broadcasting, president of Nelvana, and senior marketing positions at Campbell Soup and General Foods.

At the time of his death, he was the group vice president, broadcasting of Shaw Communications and the president of Shaw Media.
