= Zeste =

Canadian specialty television channel

- Zeste logo
- Country: Canada
- Broadcast area: National
- Headquarters: Montreal, Quebec

Programming
- Language: French
- Picture format: 480i (SDTV); 1080i (HDTV)

Ownership
- Owner: Groupe TVA
- Sister channels: Évasion

History
- Launched: March 22, 2010; 16 years ago

Links
- Website: www.tvaplus.ca/zeste

Zeste is a Canadian French-language discretionary service channel owned by Groupe TVA. Zeste airs food-related entertainment and lifestyle programming.

== History ==
On August 15, 2008, Serdy was granted approval by the Canadian Radio-television and Telecommunications Commission (CRTC) to operate "Cuisine", a national French-language category 2 digital cable specialty channel devoted to food-related programming. On January 19, 2010, Groupe Serdy announced that it was ready to launch the channel in March, and on February 24, Serdy unveiled the channel's identity, including the channel's new name (Zeste), and programming to the media.

The channel was launched on March 22 in standard and high definition.

On January 14, 2019, the CRTC approves the acquisition of the channel by Quebecor Média on behalf of its subsidiary Groupe TVA.

== Zeste HD ==
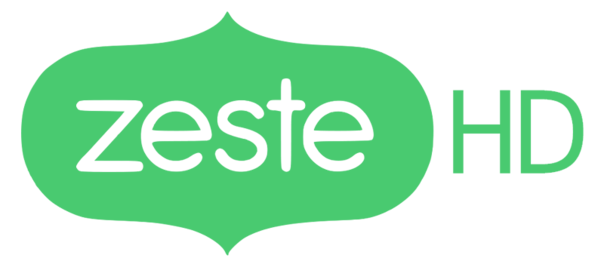

On May 2, 2011, Zeste launched Zeste HD, a high definition simulcast of the standard definition feed.

Zeste logo 2010-2020
