= DejaView =

Canadian specialty television channel

- Country: Canada
- Broadcast area: Nationwide
- Headquarters: Toronto, Ontario

Programming
- Picture format: 1080i HDTV (downscaled to letterboxed 480i for the SDTV feed)

Ownership
- Owner: Canwest (2001–2010); Shaw Media (2010–2016); Corus Entertainment (2016–present)

History
- Launched: September 4, 2001; 24 years ago

Links
- Website: dejaviewtv.ca

DejaView is a Canadian English language specialty television channel owned by Corus Entertainment. It primarily airs television shows from the 1970s to 2010s. The channel's name is a play on the phrase Deja Vu.

== History ==
In November 2000, Global Television Network Inc. (then owned by Canwest) was granted approval from the Canadian Radio-television and Telecommunications Commission (CRTC) to launch a national English-language Category 2 specialty television service called Pop TV, described as "featuring classic programs from the beginnings of television. Programming will explore vintage television and the cultural impact of television on our society by providing a window on television history."

The channel was launched on September 4, 2001, as DejaView.

After DejaView's parent company, Canwest, filed for creditor protection in October 2009, Shaw Communications subsequently completed a purchase and took over the assets of Canwest's broadcasting arm on October 27, 2010, which was announced in February of that year, and renamed the company Shaw Media.

On April 1, 2016, DejaView's parent company, Shaw Media, was acquired by Corus Entertainment. It once became a sister station to CMT and W Network (though this lapsed in later years because the former is now airing what DejaView has played in the past), as with its other sister stations such as MovieTime.

In late 2016, a 1080i high definition simulcast of the standard definition feed was launched.

== Programming ==
Throughout the channel's existence, it has primarily aired sitcoms and television dramas from the United States and Canada, however, other genres of programs have aired including game shows, reality television, and lifestyle series.

== See also ==
- Comedy Gold – a former specialty service owned by Bell Media, specializing in comedies from the 1970s to 1990s.
- Teletoon Retro – a former offshoot of Teletoon, also owned by Corus Entertainment, that focused on classic cartoons and television series aimed at children.
