= Style at Home =

Canadian monthly magazine

- Editor: Véronique Leblanc
- Categories: Lifestyle
- Frequency: Monthly
- Total circulation: 233,878 (June 2013)
- Founded: 1997
- Company: TVA Group
- Country: Canada
- Based in: Toronto
- Language: English
- Website: www.styleathome.com
- ISSN: 1206-5870

Style at Home is a monthly Canadian home decor and lifestyle magazine, which publishes articles about interior design, home decorating projects, outdoor living and entertaining.

== History and profile ==
Style at Home was established in 1997 by Telemedia. Gail Johnston Habs was the founding editor. The magazine was acquired by Transcontinental Media in 2000, and then TVA Group in 2014. The current editor-in-chief is Véronique Leblanc. The magazine's web site was launched in September 2003.
