= Blowdown (TV series) =

Canadian documentary TV series on explosive demolition

- Directed by: Ian Herring; Sean White
- Country of origin: Canada
- Original language: English
- No. of seasons: 2
- No. of episodes: 8

Production
- Executive producer: Ian Herring
- Producer: Maija Leivo
- Running time: 60 minutes
- Production company: Parallax Film Productions

Original release
- Network: National Geographic Channels International; History Television
- Release: June 25, 2008 – July 28, 2011

Blowdown is a Canadian documentary television series that follows a team of explosive demolition experts as they prepare and implode large, complex structures around the world. It was produced by the Vancouver-based Parallax Film Productions in association with National Geographic Channels International and History Television.

The series follows the work of Controlled Demolition, Inc. (CDI) of Phoenix, Maryland, a demolition firm run by the Loizeaux family. Each hour-long episode covers the planning, engineering challenges and risks of one demolition project, ending with the implosion filmed from many camera angles. The show uses exclusive footage, visual effects and computer models to explain the science behind each job.

The series premiered on National Geographic in Australia and New Zealand on September 1, 2008. It has also aired on DMAX in Germany and Five in the United Kingdom.

== Production ==
For the second season, Parallax shot the implosion of the Fonte Nova Stadium in Salvador, Brazil, in stereoscopic 3D. It was the company's first 3D documentary, and the episode aired as World Cup Demolition. The stadium was imploded on August 29, 2010. Stereographer Sean White took a 3D camera rig to the site, and Herring brought a second rig the following week.

== Episodes ==
=== Season 1 (2008) ===
Season 1 episodes cover the explosive demolition of:

- Four cooling towers at the active Sellafield nuclear site in England
- Mobile Service Tower 40, a rocket launch tower at Cape Canaveral
- A casino hotel on the Las Vegas Strip
- The Sheraton Bal Harbour resort near Miami

=== Season 2 (2011) ===
Season 2 episodes cover the explosive demolition of:

- The RCA Dome in Indianapolis
- The former U.S. Navy spy ship USNS General Hoyt S. Vandenberg, scuttled as an artificial reef
- A hurricane-resistant tower on South Padre Island
- The Fonte Nova Stadium in Salvador, Brazil, filmed in 3D
