= Argent (TV channel) =

Former Canadian specialty TV channel

- Argent logo
- Country: Canada
- Broadcast area: National
- Headquarters: Montreal, Quebec

Programming
- Picture format: 480i (SDTV)

Ownership
- Owner: Groupe TVA

History
- Launched: February 21, 2005
- Closed: April 30, 2016

Argent (Money) was a Canadian French language Category A specialty channel. The channel was devoted to business news and financial information. The channel was owned and operated by Groupe TVA, a division of Quebecor Media. It was the francophone counterpart of Business News Network.

== History ==
On November 24, 2000, a consortium of companies including Groupe TVA (50.1%), Publications Transcontinental Inc. (30%) and BCE Media Inc. (19.9%) was granted a broadcasting licence by the Canadian Radio-television and Telecommunications Commission (CRTC) for a television channel called LCN Affaires, described as "a national French-language Category 1 specialty television service devoted to business and personal finance."

Before the channel was launched, Groupe TVA bought the remaining shares from the other partners, bringing its ownership to 100%. Shortly thereafter, the channel was launched on February 21, 2005 as "Argent".

On April 19, 2016, Quebecor announced that Argent would cease broadcasting after April 30, 2016. The company cited the channel's poor profitability as justification for the decision.
