= Lifetime (Canadian TV channel) =

Canadian specialty television channel

- Country: Canada
- Broadcast area: Nationwide
- Headquarters: Toronto, Ontario

Programming
- Picture format: 1080i (HDTV) (2013–present); 480i (SDTV) (2001–present)

Ownership
- Owner: Alliance Atlantis (2001–2008); CW Media (2008–2010); Shaw Media (2010–2016); Corus Entertainment (2016–present) (branding licensed from A&E Networks)
- Parent: Showcase Television Inc.
- Sister channels: Showcase; Adult Swim

History
- Launched: September 7, 2001; 24 years ago
- Former names: Showcase Diva (2001–2012)

Links
- Website: Lifetime Canada

Lifetime is a Canadian English-language discretionary specialty channel based on the eponymous American basic cable channel owned by Showcase Television Inc., a subsidiary of Corus Entertainment. It broadcasts films, television shows and reality series aimed at women.

The channel was launched on September 7, 2001 as Showcase Diva as a digital offshoot of Showcase by Alliance Atlantis focusing on films targeting a female audience. After a series of ownership changes, the channel was relaunched into its current name in 2012 with the Lifetime branding licensed by A&E Networks.

== History ==
2001–2009

2009–2012

Logos of former network Showcase Diva

In November 2000, Alliance Atlantis (via the Showcase Television subsidiary) was granted approval by the Canadian Radio-television and Telecommunications Commission (CRTC) to launch a television channel called Romance Television, described as "a national English-language Category 2 specialty television service devoted to romance. Programming will include relationship- themed game shows and magazine style programs featuring romantic vacation resorts. Other programs will explore romantic moments in people's lives, as well as classic romantic feature films, epic mini-series and made-for-television movies."

The channel was launched on September 7, 2001 as Showcase Diva, a spin-off of Showcase. Programming consisted of primarily television dramas and films.

On January 18, 2008, Canwest Global acquired control of Showcase Diva through its purchase of Alliance Atlantis' broadcasting assets, which were placed in a trust in August 2007. On October 27, 2010, ownership changed again as Shaw Communications gained control of Showcase Diva as a result of its acquisition of Canwest and Goldman Sachs' interest in CW Media.

2012–2017

2017–2020

Logos of former channel Lifetime

On May 30, 2012, Showcase Diva changed its name to the Canadian version of Lifetime on August 27, 2012, through a brand licensing agreement with the U.S. channel's parent company A&E Networks. The rebrand would result in the addition of more reality series, talk shows and other original series from Lifetime to the channel's films and television dramas.

An HD feed was launched on May 29, 2013, along with the never-before-seen HD feeds for H2, Slice, and the DHX-owned Disney Junior service (now known as Family Jr.).

In February 2022, Lifetime was added to streaming bundle StackTV. It was later added in February 2023 to the Global TV app along with the Canadian version of the Magnolia Network.

== See also ==
- List of Canadian specialty channels
