= Mont Grand-Fonds =

Coordinates: 47°46′17″N 70°06′09″W

Mont Grand-Fonds is a ski resort in the Charlevoix region of Quebec, Canada. It is situated in a rural part of the municipality of La Malbaie, north of its urban area. It has 14 alpine trails without false flats, with 3 glades and 1 teaching trail, 3 training trails and a snow park. It also has 140 kilometers of standard cross-country skiing trails and 46 km of skate-step cross-country trails.

It has a top elevation of 735 meters, a base elevation of 400 meters with a vertical of 335 meters.

== Climate ==
Mont Grand-Fonds has a warm-summer humid continental climate (Köppen: Dfb), although it approaches a continental subarctic climate (Dfc), categorized in the highest mountains to the northwest. The high amount of snow attracts people by performing winter activities such as skiing.

Climate data for Mont Grand-Fonds, elevation: 365.8 m or 1,200 ft, 1971-2000 normals, (Note: Although the period does not fit perfectly, being 1968-1991 and therefore a semi-normal.) extremes 1968-1991
Month	Jan	Feb	Mar	Apr	May	Jun	Jul	Aug	Sep	Oct	Nov	Dec	Year
Record high °C (°F)	10.0 (50.0)	8.5 (47.3)	16.5 (61.7)	25.0 (77.0)	33.3 (91.9)	34.0 (93.2)	32.0 (89.6)	35.0 (95.0)	28.0 (82.4)	23.9 (75.0)	16.7 (62.1)	10.0 (50.0)	35.0 (95.0)
Mean daily maximum °C (°F)	−9.6 (14.7)	−7.9 (17.8)	−1.8 (28.8)	5.9 (42.6)	14.6 (58.3)	20.1 (68.2)	23.0 (73.4)	21.2 (70.2)	15.8 (60.4)	8.1 (46.6)	1.1 (34.0)	−6.5 (20.3)	7.0 (44.6)
Daily mean °C (°F)	−16.1 (3.0)	−14.2 (6.4)	−7.4 (18.7)	1.0 (33.8)	8.2 (46.8)	13.3 (55.9)	15.8 (60.4)	14.3 (57.7)	9.3 (48.7)	3.2 (37.8)	−3.4 (25.9)	−12.5 (9.5)	1.0 (33.7)
Mean daily minimum °C (°F)	−22.5 (−8.5)	−20.5 (−4.9)	−13.0 (8.6)	−3.9 (25.0)	1.7 (35.1)	6.4 (43.5)	8.6 (47.5)	7.3 (45.1)	2.8 (37.0)	−1.8 (28.8)	−7.9 (17.8)	−18.5 (−1.3)	−5.1 (22.8)
Record low °C (°F)	−40.6 (−41.1)	−42.2 (−44.0)	−37.5 (−35.5)	−25.0 (−13.0)	−8.3 (17.1)	−5.0 (23.0)	−2.5 (27.5)	−2.5 (27.5)	−10.0 (14.0)	−13.9 (7.0)	−26.7 (−16.1)	−39.0 (−38.2)	−42.2 (−44.0)
Average precipitation mm (inches)	74.6 (2.94)	62.0 (2.44)	97.6 (3.84)	87.9 (3.46)	95.5 (3.76)	95.0 (3.74)	86.3 (3.40)	94.7 (3.73)	88.5 (3.48)	93.6 (3.69)	78.6 (3.09)	99.9 (3.93)	1,054.2 (41.5)
Average rainfall mm (inches)	7.4 (0.29)	1.3 (0.05)	26.0 (1.02)	49.3 (1.94)	93.7 (3.69)	95.0 (3.74)	86.3 (3.40)	94.7 (3.73)	88.5 (3.48)	87.9 (3.46)	31.3 (1.23)	10.1 (0.40)	671.5 (26.43)
Average snowfall cm (inches)	67.2 (26.5)	60.7 (23.9)	71.5 (28.1)	38.6 (15.2)	1.8 (0.7)	0.0 (0.0)	0.0 (0.0)	0.0 (0.0)	0.0 (0.0)	5.7 (2.2)	47.4 (18.7)	89.7 (35.3)	382.6 (150.6)
Average precipitation days (≥ 0.2 mm)	8.0	6.3	9.0	9.4	11.4	12.6	12.9	13.5	11.4	11.1	8.8	9.5	123.9
Average rainy days (≥ 0.2 mm)	1.4	0.35	3.0	5.9	11.3	12.6	12.9	13.5	11.4	10.9	4.5	1.4	89.15
Average snowy days (≥ 0.2 cm)	7.2	6.1	6.3	4.0	0.15	0.0	0.0	0.0	0.0	0.50	4.7	8.5	37.45
Source: Environment Canada
