= Le Journal de Québec =

Canadian French-language daily newspaper

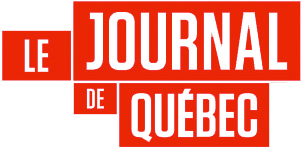
- Type: Daily newspaper
- Format: Tabloid
- Owner: Quebecor
- Founder: Pierre Péladeau
- Founded: 1967
- Political alignment: Right-wing populism, Quebec nationalism, Quebec sovereigntism
- Language: French
- Headquarters: 450, avenue Béchard; Quebec City, Quebec; G1M 2E9
- Circulation: 82,048 weekdays 89,989 Saturdays; 82,537 Sundays (as of 2014)
- ISSN: 0839-1106
- OCLC number: 802434941
- Website: www.journaldequebec.com

Le Journal de Québec is a French-language daily newspaper in Quebec City, Quebec, Canada. Printed in tabloid format, it has the highest circulation for a Quebec City newspaper, with its closest competitor being Le Soleil.

It was founded March 6, 1967, by Pierre Péladeau, founder of Quebecor. Like its sister paper, the much more widely-read Le Journal de Montréal, it was established by Pierre Péladeau and is owned by Quebecor Média.

A lockout of unionized employees (members of the Canadian Union of Public Employees) began in April 2007 and continued until July 2008. It was the longest-running lockout in the history of the Québec media until then.

As an answer to the lockout, the workers launched their own free daily newspaper, MédiaMatin Québec.

On November 27, 2012, Le Journal de Québec launched a special edition for the Saguenay–Lac-Saint-Jean region, which includes several pages of local news for the region. The paper had published a special Saguenay–Lac-Saint-Jean edition from 1973 to 1981.

== See also ==
- List of Quebec media
- List of newspapers in Canada
