= MovieTime =

- MovieTime logo
- Country: Canada
- Broadcast area: Nationwide
- Headquarters: Toronto, Ontario

Programming
- Picture format: 1080i (HDTV) (2010–present); 480i (SDTV) (2001–present)

Ownership
- Owner: Canwest (2001–2010); Shaw Media (2010–2016); Corus Entertainment (2016–present) (Corus Television LP)
- Sister channels: CMT; Showcase; Slice; Disney Channel; W Network; Lifetime; Adult Swim; Home Network; Flavour Network; W Network; Slice; National Geographic; Nat Geo Wild; History; Global

History
- Launched: September 7, 2001; 25 years ago
- Former names: Lonestar (2001–2008)

Links
- Website: MovieTime

MovieTime is a Canadian television English–language specialty channel owned by Corus Entertainment. It primarily broadcasts films, with 250 titles per month and back-to-back movies on weekends. Unlike other Canadian movie channels, MovieTime operates as an advertiser-supported service.

== History ==
In November 2000, Canwest, through its subsidiary Global Television Network Inc., was granted approval by the Canadian Radio-television and Telecommunications Commission (CRTC) to launch a television channel called Adventure, described as "a national English-language Category 2 specialty television service devoted to action and adventure programming. Its program schedule will run the gamut from contemporary "popcorn" action and adventure films and series, to classical westerns, rodeo and western horse shows."

The channel was launched under the name Lonestar on September 7, 2001, focusing exclusively on Western and rural-themed programming such as films, television dramas, and lifestyle series. After a few years, Lonestar began to air more general action and adventure programming unrelated to the Western theme of its early years, a considerable amount of that being movies, to the point where they made up the majority of the schedule. On August 21, 2008, Canwest announced that Lonestar would be rebranded as "MovieTime", focusing on contemporary films. The name change took effect on October 6, 2008. A high definition simulcast feed of MovieTime was launched on March 12, 2010.

On October 27, 2010, Shaw Communications gained control of MovieTime as a result of its acquisition of Canwest, which was renamed Shaw Media. On April 1, 2016, Shaw Media was sold to Corus Entertainment.

== Logos ==
2001–2008	2008–present	MovieTime HD logo
