= Charles-Albert Poissant =

Québécois businessman and philanthropist

Charles-Albert Poissant (1925–2011) was a Canadian businessman, philanthropist, and prominent figure in Quebec's economic landscape. Born in Montreal, Quebec, Poissant dedicated much of his life to entrepreneurship and charitable initiatives, with his philanthropic efforts primarily focused on advancing education and healthcare sectors in Canada.

As a Québécois business leader, Poissant contributed to the province's commercial development while simultaneously championing social causes. His philanthropic legacy includes substantial support for educational institutions, medical research, and healthcare infrastructure, reflecting his commitment to fostering community well-being and accessibility to critical services.

== Biography ==
Charles-Albert Poissant was born in Montreal, Quebec. He married and had four children, and earned a diploma from the Hautes Études commerciales (HEC Montréal) in 1953. Beginning his career as a trainee at Middleton Hope & Co., an English-speaking chartered accounting firm later known as KPMG, Poissant rose to become Senior Associate for Quebec, and ultimately served as National Manager for nearly a decade (Mercure, 2007).

A key figure in Québec's business community, Poissant acted as the principal collaborator and advisor to Pierre Péladeau, founder of Quebecor, from the company's inception in 1950. He played a central role in expanding the Quebecor empire, notably negotiating major acquisitions. From 1987 to 1997, he served as president and CEO of Donohue Inc., and in 1999, he became chairman of the board of Quebecor Inc., marking him as the first Francophone president and chief executive officer of a Canadian newsprint producer.

Deeply engaged in civic and professional organizations, Poissant held leadership roles including president of the Ordre des comptables agréés du Québec, member of the Bélanger-Campeau Commission on Quebec's political and constitutional future, president of the Triennial Advisory Committee on judicial compensation for the Court of Quebec, and president of the Canadian branch of the International Fiscal Association. He also served on the executive committees of National Bank of Canada, Hydro-Québec, First Choice Networks Inc., and the Hôpital du Sacré-Cœur de Montréal, among others.

From 1998 onward, Poissant focused on philanthropy, contributing his expertise to educational and healthcare initiatives. He joined the boards of the Université du Québec à Montréal Foundation, the Hôpital du Sacré-Cœur de Montréal Foundation, the Paul Gérin-Lajoie Foundation, and the Canadian National Institute for the Blind. Additionally, he served as President of the Corporation des Jeux du Québec and ambassador for the Jeux du Québec finals in Matane. Until his death, he maintained an office at Quebecor's Saint-Jacques Street headquarters in Montreal, which he visited daily.

In his later years, Poissant prioritized issues of governance and international development, particularly the effectiveness of aid from wealthy nations to developing regions. Drawing from his modest upbringing, he championed structured, ethical assistance programs. In 2006, he helped establish the C-A Poissant Chair at UQAM to study and improve the management of aid funds, aiming to develop a code of ethics for national and international development practices.

Reflecting on his lifelong optimism, Poissant credited a mantra inspired by French psychologist Émile Coué: “Every day, in every way, I am getting better and better.” Philippe Mercure (2007) noted this philosophy guided both his business success and personal demeanor. Even at age 82, colleagues such as communications manager Anne Béland remarked, “He wants to change the world.”

Dans ce qu'on pourrait appeler un "coming-out spiritual", l'homme d'affaires devenu philanthrope vient de publier le secret de sa bonne humeur et de sa réussite en affaires. Un secret, disons-le tout de suite, qui n'est pas près d'être enseigné dans les écoles de comptabilité. Car il passe par le subconscient. ». Le truc : à l’heure où la plupart d’entre nous se réveillent en grognant contre le réveille-matin, Charles-Albert Poissant bondit du lit et clame haut et fort: «Tous les jours, et à tout point de vue, je vais de mieux en mieux.». Le mantra lui vient d'Émile Coué, un pharmacien français né en 1857 et consacré « père de la pensée positive

— Philippe Mercure, 2007. Ce mantra a guidé sa vie.

Charles-Albert Poissant died on 11 March 2011.

== Awards ==
Throughout his career, Charles-Albert Poissant received numerous prestigious honours and recognitions:

- 1984: Named a Fellow of the Ordre des comptables agréés du Québec.
- 1996: Appointed as a Member of the Order of Canada.
- 1999: Awarded an honorary doctorate in law studies from Concordia University.

== Publications ==
Charles-Albert Poissant authored several works reflecting his business philosophy and experiences:

- Donohue : L'histoire d'un grand succès québécois. Québec Amérique, 1998.
- How to Think Like a Millionaire: Ten of the Richest Men in the World and the Secrets of Their Success. HarperCollins Publishers Ltd, 2001.
- Réussir. Programmer son succès. Éditions Logiques, 2007.

== Philanthropy ==
Charles-Albert Poissant supported or contributed to several philanthropic initiatives and organizations, primarily in education, healthcare, and international development:

=== The Paul-Gérin-Lajoie Foundation ===
Sponsored by the Canadian International Development Agency (CIDA), the foundation focuses on improving educational outcomes in Burkina Faso by training teachers and administrators to enhance the quality of classroom materials and pedagogy.

=== The CNIB Foundation ===
A national registered charity, the CNIB Foundation promotes vision health and independence for Canadians with sight loss through research, public education, and community support programs. Its mission centres on advancing accessibility and quality of life for individuals living with vision impairment.

=== Hôpital du Sacré-Coeur de Montréal Foundation ===
The foundation raises funds to support the hospital’s priority projects, including the acquisition of advanced medical equipment, research initiatives, clinical training programs, and improvements to patient care services.

=== Chaire Charles-Albert Poissant de transplantation cornéenne de l'Université de Montréal (Charles-Albert Poissant Chair in Corneal Transplantation) ===
Established at the University of Montreal, this chair aims to refine corneal transplant techniques through innovations in laser technology, improving surgical precision and patient outcomes.

=== Chaire Charles-Albert Poissant sur la gouvernance et l'aide au développement de l'UQAM (Charles-Albert Poissant Chair in Governance and Development Aid) ===
Based at the Université du Québec à Montréal (UQAM), this research initiative examines transparency in international aid flows and evaluates the effectiveness of development strategies. Its goal is to establish ethical frameworks for national and global cooperation programs.

=== Prenez position pour l'UQAM Campaign (Take a Stand for UQAM) ===
Chaired by National Bank CEO Réal Raymond, an ESG-UQAM graduate, this fundraising campaign has secured CAD 53 million from corporate partners, alumni, and community donors. Funds support student scholarships, infrastructure development, and academic programming at UQAM.

== Quotes ==
About Pierre Péladeau:

- Ici, la relation maître serviteur n’existe pas. Nous ne savions ni l’un ni l’autre qu’un jour nous deviendrions les plus grands imprimeurs au monde.
  (Poissant, 2007)
- Ma première rencontre avec Pierre Péladeau a eu lieu en juillet 1950. J’ai cru spontanément en lui et je le lui ai même dit dès notre première rencontre.
  (Poissant, 2007)
- Mais je n’ai jamais été un yes man ! Je l’ai souvent rappelé à l’Ordre dans mon rôle de comptable pendant toutes ces années.
  (Laprade, 2007)

About Wayne Gretzky:

- M. Poissant mentions legendary hockey player Wayne Gretzky quote:

A good hockey player plays where the puck is. A great hockey player plays where the puck is going to be.

(Laprade, 2007).

About David Spielberg (in his book "How to Think Like a Millionaire"):

- Spielberg had faith. He believed in his talent. He knew he was capable of doing big things even though he was young. He realized however that it was up to him alone to create his own lucky break.
  (Paquin, 1998)

About his book « Réussir. Programmer son succès »

- …So much the better if I can touch the man in the street, and specially young people, with my thoughts.
- I simply expose a theory that I experimented myself. For me, everything is simple: we all have a natural resource, the brain, and this resource is endless. But one has to use it in the right way.
  (Laprade, 2007)

== Bibliography ==
=== Books and Publications ===
- Poissant, Charles-Albert. How to Think Like a Millionaire: Ten of the Richest Men in the World and the Secrets of Their Success. Toronto: HarperCollins Publishers Ltd, 2001.
- Poissant, Charles-Albert. Réussir. Programmer son succès [Succeed: Programming Your Success]. Montreal: Éditions Logiques, 2007.

=== Journalistic Profiles ===
- Laprade, Yvon. "À 82 ans, Charles-Albert Poissant devient écrivain" ["At 82, Charles-Albert Poissant Becomes an Author"]. Journal de Montréal, 17 September 2007.
- Mercure, Philippe. "Charles-Albert Poissant ou programmer son subconscient" ["Charles-Albert Poissant: Programming the Subconscious"]. La Presse, 20 October 2007.
- Paquin, Yves. "Going Against the Grain." CAMagazine, November 1998.

=== Institutional references ===
- Chaire C.A. Poissant de recherche sur la gouvernance et l’aide au développement [C.A. Poissant Chair in Governance and Development Aid Research]. "Presentation of Charles-Albert Poissant." Université du Québec à Montréal, n.d.
