= Historia (TV channel) =

French-Canadian cable channel

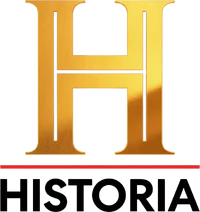
- Country: Canada
- Broadcast area: Nationwide
- Headquarters: Montreal, Quebec

Programming
- Language: French
- Picture format: 1080i HDTV (downscaled to letterboxed 480i for the SDTV feed)

Ownership
- Owner: Astral Media (2000–2013); Alliance Atlantis (2000–2007); Canwest (2008–2010); Shaw Media (2010–2013); Corus Entertainment (2013–present) (branding licensed from A&E Networks)
- Sister channels: History; History2

History
- Launched: January 31, 2000; 26 years ago

Links
- Website: historiatv.com

Historia is a Canadian discretionary service owned by Corus Entertainment. The network broadcasts French-language programming related to history and historical fiction, and is a sister network to the English-language History; both channels operate as Canadian licensees of the U.S. network History.

== History ==
Original logo used from the channel's launch until 2010

Second logo used from the channel until 2015, when it was replaced with Historia Spain's logo

Licensed by the Canadian Radio-television and Telecommunications Commission (CRTC) as Canal Histoire to Alliance Atlantis and Premier Choix Networks (Astral), the channel was launched on January 31, 2000, as Historia.

On January 18, 2008, a joint venture between Canwest and Goldman Sachs Alternatives known as CW Media bought Alliance Atlantis and gained its interest in Historia. The new company also acquired Historia's English language equivalent, History Television (now History).

On October 27, 2010, Shaw Communications completed its acquisition of Canwest and Goldman Sachs' interest in CW Media, giving it control of CW Media's 50% interest in Historia.

On March 4, 2013, Corus Entertainment announced that it would acquire Astral Media's stakes in Séries+ and Historia, as well as several other properties, under separate transactions with the two companies. The purchase was tied to Bell Media's pending takeover of Astral Media; an earlier proposal had been rejected by the CRTC in October 2012 due to concerns surrounding its total market share following the merger, but was restructured under the condition that the companies divest certain media properties. In a separate deal, Corus also acquired Shaw's interests in Séries+ and Historia, giving it full ownership. The deals were approved by the CRTC on 20 December 2013 and Corus become the full owner of the channel on 1 January 2014.

Third logo used in 2015 and 2016

Fourth logo used from 2016 to 2022

On October 21, 2014, Corus reached an agreement with A&E Networks to acquire French-language rights to programming from History, the U.S. counterpart of Historia's English-language sister network. The network was relaunched under History's logo and branding on March 9, 2015, while maintaining the Historia name.

The channel became a French-language version of its sister channel on April 1, 2016 following Corus Entertainment's acquisition of Shaw Media.

On October 17, 2017, Bell Media announced its intent to acquire Historia and Séries+ from Corus for $200 million, pending regulatory approval. Corus cited the two channels as not being part of the company's "strategic priorities" at this time; the deal came shortly after an announcement that Corus no longer planned to commission original programs for the two channels. On 28 May 2018, both transactions were blocked by the Competition Bureau, as a violation of conditions placed on Bell's acquisition of Astral Media, which barred it from re-acquiring any of the properties it divested in the merger for 10 years. As a result, Bell and Corus mutually agreed to shelve the sale.

== High-definition feed ==
On October 30, 2006, Astral Media launched a high definition simulcast feed of Historia.
