= Yoopa =

Canadian pay television channel aimed at kids

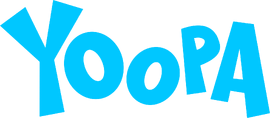
- Country: Canada
- Broadcast area: Nationwide
- Headquarters: Montreal, Quebec

Programming
- Language: French
- Picture format: 1080i HDTV (downscaled to letterboxed 480i for the SDTV feed)

Ownership
- Owner: Groupe TVA

History
- Launched: April 1, 2010; 16 years ago
- Closed: January 11, 2024; 2 years ago
- Replaced by: Qub Radio video simulcast
- Former names: TVA Junior (pre-launch)

Yoopa (stylized YOOPA) was a Canadian French language specialty channel owned by Groupe TVA, a division of Quebecor Media. Initially aimed at preschoolers, Yoopa has broadcast programming targeted toward children, aged 2–11.

A magazine for parents using the Yoopa name was launched on April 1, 2010, in conjunction with the launch of the television channel. The magazine replaced EspaceParents.ca, owned by TVA Publications, a division of Groupe TVA.

On November 13, 2023, Groupe TVA announced that the channel would be shut down on January 11, 2024. The channel was replaced with a TV version of Groupe TVA's Qub Radio channel, and Yoopa's programming rights moved to the video on demand service Club Illico.

== History ==
In February 2010, TVA Group was granted approval by the Canadian Radio-television and Telecommunications Commission (CRTC) to launch a television channel called TVA Junior, described as "a national French-language Category 2 specialty programming undertaking aimed exclusively at children from two to six years old."

Previous Yoopa logo (2010–2013), was used as an alternate logo until January 2014

The channel was launched on April 1, 2010, as Yoopa.

=== Dispute with Vrak.TV Junior ===
Before Yoopa's launch and its approval by the CRTC, fellow broadcaster Astral Media had been approved for a similar channel in March 2006 called Vrak.TV Junior. Prior to its launch, Astral Media claimed that it had secured carriage on a number of other television providers, except Vidéotron – who has a hold of 51% of the Quebec market, the largest French market in Canada – owned by Quebecor Media, the parent of TVA Group. Astral claimed Vidéotron's refusal to carry the channel was to avoid competition for its upcoming channel, Yoopa. Astral attributed the delay in the launch of Vrak Junior to Vidéotron's refusal to carry the channel. Vidéotron categorically denied the accusation.

Vrak.TV Junior was launched on July 5, 2010, as Playhouse Disney Télé (later Disney Junior and then Télémagino) on Bell Satellite TV. Vidéotron launched the channel on March 1, 2011.

=== Closure ===
On August 17, 2023, in response to Vidéotron removing Bell Media's Vrak and Z TV channels from their TV services, Bell removed Yoopa from all of their TV platforms, citing a declining base of subscribers to the network. Vrak closed on September 30 that same year.

On November 13, 2023, Groupe TVA announced that Yoopa would be shut down at midnight on January 11, 2024, due to easier access to programming direct from foreign platforms and to allow TVA to concentrate on its remaining specialty services. Yoopa's existing programming rights were transferred to its streaming service Club Illico and TVA+. The channel was subsequently replaced at 6:00 a.m. the next morning with a video simulcast of programs from TVA's QUB Radio service, known simply as QUB.

== International distribution ==
- Saint Pierre and Miquelon (French overseas collectivity) - distributed on the SPM Telecom system.
