= Shaw Media =

Former Canadian media and broadcasting company

Shaw Media, Inc.
- Final logo used from 2012 to 2016
- Type: Division
- Industry: Mass media
- Predecessor: Western International Communications; Canwest Global; Alliance Atlantis
- Founded: October 27, 2010; 15 years ago
- Defunct: April 1, 2016; 10 years ago
- Fate: Acquired by Corus Entertainment
- Headquarters: Toronto, Ontario, Canada
- Area served: Canada
- Parent: Shaw Communications

Shaw Media, Inc. was the television broadcasting division of Shaw Communications. It owned the Global Television Network, which broadcasts nationally via 13 television stations, as well as 19 specialty channels including Slice, HGTV Canada, Showcase, Food Network Canada, and History. Shaw Media consisted of the broadcasting assets of the former Canwest. Shaw Media properties were acquired in April 2016 by sister company Corus Entertainment.

== History ==
The Canwest logo used from 2004 to 2010

=== As Canwest Global ===
In 1974, a group led by Israel Asper bought the assets of Pembina, North Dakota television station KCND-TV from broadcaster Gordon McLendon, moving the station to Winnipeg as independent station CKND-TV. Asper, through his company, Canwest, eventually bought out his partners in the Winnipeg station. A few months later, the Asper group joined a consortium that bought CKGN-TV, a network of six simulcasting transmitters across Ontario that carried many of CKND's programs and was known on-air as the Global Television Network. Canwest bought controlling interest in 1985, thus becoming the first western-based owner of a major Canadian broadcaster.

Canwest subsequently invested in or acquired other independent TV stations across Canada. Eventually, Asper's station group became known as the "Canwest Global System." In 1997, Canwest bought controlling interest in CKMI-TV, the privately owned CBC affiliate in Quebec City. Canwest then set up CKMI rebroadcasters in Montreal and Sherbrooke. With this move, Canwest's stations now had enough coverage of Canada that on August 18—the day CKMI officially disaffiliated from CBC—Canwest rebranded its station group as "The Global Television Network". Throughout the 1990s, Global (and its antecedents) held Canadian rights to hit U.S. series such as Cheers, Friends, and Frasier.

Canwest also bought broadcasting assets internationally, including outlets in New Zealand, the Republic of Ireland, and Australia, although all were eventually sold off. In 1991, Canwest issued a successful initial public offering on the Toronto Stock Exchange. In June 1996, Canwest was listed on the New York Stock Exchange.

Lacking a presence in Alberta, the company set its sights on Western International Communications, which owned three independent stations in that province that carried Global programming. It eventually bought that company's broadcasting assets in 2000. This not only boosted Global's coverage in western Canada, but prompted the establishment of a second over-the-air service, originally known as CH, since in some areas the combined company had duplicate over-the-air coverage through multiple stations. Later that year, Canwest announced its acquisition of the Southam newspaper chain from Conrad Black, in order to pursue a media convergence strategy.

Canwest was initially slow to invest in specialty channels due to the strength of its terrestrial network. In 1999, seeking to change this, the company announced a deal to buy out the Canadian partners of NetStar Communications, owner of TSN, but was stymied by U.S. partner ESPN, which had veto power over such a sale. ESPN instead came to terms with Canwest's main rival CTV, a longtime business partner of ESPN's parent company Disney, as an acceptable buyer.

Canwest's various acquisitions took a significant financial toll. As early as 2002, most of Canwest's operating income was going to pay interest on its high-interest rate debt. By 2007, the company's bonds were downgraded to junk status.

In October 2005, CanWest's Canadian newspapers were sold into an IPO trust. Sold 25.8% of Canada's newspapers for C$550 million. Attached to the Canadian newspaper IPO was $850 million in long term debt. CanWest bought back the 25.8% Newspaper Trust IPO (and debt) in November 2008, for cash considerations of $495 million.

The company was already one of the largest owners of Canadian local TV stations, when Canwest and Goldman Sachs in 2007 announced they would jointly acquire Canadian producer and broadcaster Alliance Atlantis Communications and its large stable of wide-distribution specialty channels. Under the deal, Canwest took control of the broadcasting portion of AAC, although Goldman Sachs remained a major investor in those assets. Goldman retained or resold the remaining pieces of AAC, the distribution arm soon re-emerging as Alliance Films.

Canwest executives testified in the Canadian Radio-television and Telecommunications Commission hearings over fee-for-carriage, requesting that the commission force cable and satellite companies to pay for their signals without passing the fees on to their subscribers. In his testimony, Canwest president Leonard Asper blamed the current rules for the poor financial condition of Canada's broadcast television stations, a position which has subsequently been adopted and addressed through rule changes by the CRTC and FCC.

By early 2009, it became clear the company's debt was not manageable during the 2008 financial crisis, forcing Canwest into an extended set of negotiations with its lenders and a series of cost-cutting moves. The company's income statements reported net losses in 2008 and 2009, even though its operating activities were profitable (before taxes, interest, and non-operating charges: C$197 million in 2009, vs. C$428 million in 2008).

On August 31, 2009, Canwest shut down its secondary system E! (the former CH). Three of the former E! owned-and-operated stations – CHCH Hamilton, CHEK Victoria, and CJNT Montreal – were sold to third parties, while a fourth, CHBC Kelowna, was converted to a Global station. The remaining station, CHCA Red Deer, was closed as of the same date.

On September 24, the company announced that it would sell its 50.1% stake in Ten Network Holdings for A$680 million, in order to pay down its significant debt. The sale of CanWest's Australian media operations reduced some C$582-million in debt tied to the Australian TV network, raising the total value Canwest can erase from its overall debt to more than C$1.2-billion. Before the Ten deal, Canwest held about C$3.8-billion of debt on its balance sheet. In court documents, Goldman Sachs alleges "fraudulent" and "abusive" changes to the internal operation of Canwest in the days before it filed for creditor protection. As part of the filing, the Wall Street investment bank is seeking to undo these changes, and has also claimed that CanWest's creditors should return the C$426 million they received from Canwest balance sheet in September, after CanWest sold its stake in Ten.

On October 6, the company voluntarily filed for creditor protection under the Companies' Creditors Arrangement Act (CCAA), due to C$4 billion mounting debt across radio, television broadcasting and publishing assets in several countries. At the same time it announced it had agreed to a recapitalization transaction with some of its lenders, which will likely require the approval of the Canadian Radio-television and Telecommunications Commission (CRTC). When completed, bondholders – led by hedge funds West Face Capital, GoldenTree Asset Management, and Beach Point Capital Management – will own a majority of shares, leaving existing shareholders, including the Asper family, with a total of 2.3% of the "new" Canwest. However, the Aspers are expected to invest a further C$15 million in the restructured entity. In January 2010, CanWest's bonds commanded about 70 cents on the dollar. CanWest's bonds at one point traded for as little as 15 cents on the dollar. Several sources say that as CanWest notes increased fivefold in price, distressed-debt funds took profits on part of their position, with Angelo Gordon among the buyers.

On February 3, 2010, it was reported that a group led by Golden Tree Asset Management LP complained that "it was unfairly frozen out of the auction of Canwest Limited Partnership."

As part of the transaction, Canwest and some of its subsidiaries, including Canwest Media Inc., The National Post Company, and Canwest Television LP (the licensee of Global, MovieTime, DejaView, and Fox Sports World Canada) filed for creditor protection under the CCAA. Canwest Limited Partnership, a subsidiary which owns the company's other newspaper assets and online properties, is negotiating separately with creditors, and is expected to file for creditor protection at a later date. Specialty channels operated in partnership with other companies (such as TVtropolis, Mystery TV, MenTV, and the former Alliance Atlantis properties) are also not included in the present filing. Canwest shares were also suspended from trading on the TSX.

Canwest said that it was not being liquidated at this point, and the company insisted that the proceedings would make Canwest "a stronger industry competitor with a renewed financial outlook." Nevertheless, some analysts expected that the conglomerate would sell assets or be broken up entirely as the restructuring process continues, noting that the publishing division has a separate set of lenders. As it turned out, the company would indeed be broken up.

In February 2010, the company announced an agreement with Shaw Communications whereby the latter company would buy an 80% voting interest, and 20% equity interest, in the restructured entity, pending approvals from the Canadian Radio-television and Telecommunications Commission (CRTC) and others. The company's newspapers were not part of the Shaw deal and were already sold separately to Postmedia Network. However, the Asper family with Goldman and Catalyst made their own bid to retake Canwest with a $120 million bid in competition with the bid proposed by Shaw Communications. On February 25, 2010, it was announced that Shaw Communications had won a court battle to continue their plans to purchase assets & voting shares from Canwest. After the announcement, Shaw revealed that its investment amounted to a minimum of $95-million in exchange for 20 per cent of the equity and an 80-per-cent voting interest in the restructured company.

Although Goldman, Catalyst, and the Aspers continued to work on their own bid after the Shaw agreement, Shaw announced a revised agreement, following court ordered mediation, under which it would purchase the entirety of Canwest's broadcasting operations, including the portion owned by Goldman. This deal was later modified following a second court ordered mediation to include a settlement agreement between Shaw, creditors, and the Official Ad Hoc Committee of Shareholders, led by the Aspers, Blott Asset Management, L.L.C. and two other hedge funds. This marked the first successful equity committee campaign in Canada under CCAA. A modified deal, including the Settlement Agreement, received the approval of the Ontario Superior Court on June 23, 2010, the Competition Bureau as of August 13, 2010, and was given final approval from the CRTC on October 22, 2010, with final closing occurring in October 2011 following the official CMI Transition Order. Canwest is now delisted from the TSX. Canwest was renamed to 2737469 Canada Inc. and ceased doing business that same date (the company would officially be dissolved later that year). Meanwhile, Shaw Communications reorganized Canwest into Shaw Media.

=== As Shaw Media ===
The new division was named Shaw Media, reviving a name previously used for a separate set of media properties owned by Shaw prior to 1999, when the latter group was spun off as Corus Entertainment. Despite both companies being controlled by the Shaw family, Corus and the then-new Shaw Media remained independent, separately-managed entities.

Logo used from 2010 to 2012

On May 12, 2011, Shaw Media sold BBC Kids to the government of British Columbia via the provincial public broadcaster Knowledge Network.

On September 2, 2014, Paul W. Robertson, the president of Shaw Media since its creation, died from cancer at age 59. He was replaced by Barbara Williams.

On January 13, 2016, Corus Entertainment announced that it would acquire Shaw Media for $2.65 billion, in a corporate reorganization that would be used to fund Shaw's acquisition of Wind Mobile. The deal was approved by the CRTC on March 23, 2016. Since both companies shared a common owner in JR Shaw, the CRTC legally considered the transaction to be a corporate reorganization, and thus exempted it from tangible benefits rules and concentration of media ownership scrutiny. Shaw Media was renamed to Corus Media Holdings, Inc. on September 1, 2016.

== Operations ==
Shaw Media operated twenty specialty channels, two community channels and one pay-per-view channel, including Slice, HGTV Canada, Showcase, Food Network Canada, National Geographic Channel, Lifetime, BBC Canada, History, and H2

The Global Television Network broadcasts via 13 television stations, reaching:

- BC (CHAN Vancouver)
- Okanagan (CHBC Kelowna)
- Edmonton (CITV)
- Calgary (CICT)
- Lethbridge (CISA)
- Regina (CFRE)
- Saskatoon (CFSK)
- Winnipeg (CKND)
- Thunder Bay (CHFD, affiliate)
- Toronto (CIII)
- Montreal (CKMI)
- New Brunswick (CHNB Saint John)
- Halifax (CIHF)
