= Le Canal Nouvelles =

Canadian French-language news channel

- Country: Canada
- Broadcast area: National
- Headquarters: Montreal, Quebec

Programming
- Picture format: 480i (SDTV); 1080i (HDTV)

Ownership
- Owner: Groupe TVA

History
- Launched: September 8, 1997; 29 years ago
- Former names: Le Canal Nouvelles TVA

Links
- Website: www.tvaplus.ca/lcn (in French)

Le Canal Nouvelles (LCN) is a Canadian French language discretionary service 24-hour headline news channel owned by Groupe TVA, a division of Québecor. Its broadcasting headquarters are located in Montreal, Quebec. The channel, operated and programmed by the TVA Nouvelles division, was launched on September 1997.

== Programming ==
LCN broadcasts two 30-minute news segments per hour with headlines scrolling at the bottom of the screen.

Québecor also owns the TVA network. Many news reports shown on TVA are also shown on LCN. LCN also runs four TVA-produced newscasts: at 5pm weekdays, and noon/6pm/10pm daily, with the TVA logo superimposed over the LCN logo.

LCN's anchors have included Pierre Bruneau, Réjean Léveillé, Jean-François Guérin, Karine Champagne, Pascale Déry, Julie Marcoux, Mélanie Bergeron and Pierre Cantin.

The channel broadcasts factual current affairs programs, such as Denis Lévesque (hosted by Denis Lévesque, Le Vrai Négociateur (hosted by Claude Poirier), Dumont (hosted by Mario Dumont), and Franchement Martineau (hosted by Richard Martineau).

== Previous logos ==
| 1997–2005 | 2007–2014 | 2014–2020 |

== LCN HD ==
A high definition channel called LCN HD was launched as a simulcast of LCN on December 7, 2009. It is available on Cogeco, Vidéotron, Bell Satellite TV, Bell Fibe and Shaw Direct.

== See also ==
- Television in Quebec
- Culture of Quebec
- Ici RDI, French Canada's other news channel
