= Casa (TV channel) =

Canadian French-language pay TV channel

- Country: Canada
- Broadcast area: National
- Headquarters: Montreal, Quebec

Programming
- Picture format: 480i (SDTV); 1080i (HDTV)

Ownership
- Owner: Groupe TVA

History
- Launched: February 19, 2008
- Former names: Télé-Services (2005–2008; pre-launch); Les idées de ma maison télé (2008–2010)

Links
- Website: www.tvaplus.ca/casa (in French)

Casa (stylized CASA) is a Canadian French language discretionary service channel that is dedicated to the home including home and garden renovations and design, cooking, and real estate. It is owned by Groupe TVA, a division of Quebecor Media, and airs a mix of original productions and dubbed versions of series produced by the American and Canadian versions of HGTV.

== History ==
On October 21, 2005, Groupe TVA was granted a broadcasting licence by the Canadian Radio-television and Telecommunications Commission (CRTC) for a channel called Télé-Services, described as "a national, French-language Category 2 specialty programming undertaking offering programming devoted to manual labour such as construction, renovations, repairs, gardening, landscaping, decorating, interior design, mechanics and hobbies."

The channel was launched on February 19, 2008 as Les idées de ma maison télé, branded as a spin-off of the Quebecor-owned magazine Les idées de ma maison.

On October 18, 2010, Les idées de ma maison was renamed "Casa", the Spanish word for "house", while still focusing on the same genre of programming.

=== Casa HD ===
Casa's Facebook page announced that the channel would launch a high definition feed on December 14, 2011. The channel was launched on December 14.

=== Logos ===
2008–2010	2010–2011	2011–2021
