= Évasion =

Canadian French-language pay TV channel

- Country: Canada
- Broadcast area: National
- Headquarters: Montreal, Quebec

Programming
- Picture format: 480i (SDTV); 1080i (HDTV)

Ownership
- Owner: Groupe TVA
- Sister channels: Zeste

History
- Launched: January 31, 2000; 25 years ago
- Former names: Canal Évasion (2000–2008)

Links
- Website: www.tvaplus.ca/evasion (in French)

Évasion is a Canadian French language discretionary service channel owned by Groupe TVA. The channel broadcasts programming devoted to travel and adventure.

== History ==
In May 1999, a consortium consisting of BCE Inc. (50.1%), Groupe Serdy (19.9%), Grouped TVA Inc. (10%), Media Overseas (10%), and Pathé/Canal Voyage France (10%) were granted approval by the Canadian Radio-television and Telecommunications Commission (CRTC) to launch a television channel called Canal Évasion, described as "a national French-language television specialty service that is dedicated exclusively to tourism, adventure and travel."

Logo used from 2000 to 2002. Shows the initial play-on usage of the accute accent above the É, which still carries forward with its current logo.

Evasion's logo, 2002–2008. This logo inspired the current logo.

The channel was launched on January 31, 2000, as "Canal Évasion".

After various acquisitions over the years, ownership is held by the managing partner Groupe Serdy (formerly Serdy direct inc.) and Groupe TVA as a minority partner.

In December 2008, the channel unveiled a new image including a new logo and on-air presentation, including simplifying its name by dropping the "Canal".

On January 14, 2019, the Canadian Radio-television and Telecommunications Commission (CRTC) approved the acquisition of the channel by Quebecor Média on behalf of its subsidiary Groupe TVA.

Logo from 2008 - 2020. In 2014, the logo colours were changed, entirely in teal blue within this logo.

On June 12, 2009, Shaw Direct launched an HD simulcast of Évasion.
