= Prise 2 =

Canadian French-language pay TV channel

- Country: Canada
- Broadcast area: National
- Headquarters: Montreal, Quebec

Programming
- Picture format: 1080i (HDTV); 480i (SDTV)

Ownership
- Owner: Groupe TVA

History
- Launched: February 9, 2006

Links
- Website: www.tvaplus.ca/prise2 (in French)

Prise 2 (French: "Take 2") is a Canadian French language specialty channel owned by Groupe TVA, a division of Quebecor Media.

Prise 2 broadcasts television series and films, primarily from Quebec and the United States, from the 1970s, 1980s, and 1990s.

Prise 2 has a logo similar to TV Land in the united states, despite having similar logos, they have the same television format(Which is broadcasting television series from the 1970s to the 1990s)

== History ==
Logo used from launch to December 2010

Logo used from December 2010 to December 2018

In October 2005, TVA Group was granted approval by the Canadian Radio-television and Telecommunications Commission (CRTC) to launch a television channel called Nostalgie, described as "a national, French-language Category 2 specialty programming undertaking devoted to television and movie classics."

The channel was launched on February 9, 2006 as Prise 2.

On August 27, 2012, Groupe TVA launched Prise 2 HD, a HD feed simulcasting the standard definition feed. It is currently available on Vidéotron, Bell Satellite TV and Bell Fibe TV.
