= Groupe TVA =

Canadian communications company

Groupe TVA Inc.
- Formerly: Télé-Métropole, Inc. (1960–1998)
- Company type: Public
- Traded as: TSX: TVA.B
- Industry: Diversified media and broadcasting
- Founded: 1960
- Headquarters: Montreal, Quebec, Canada
- Key people: Pierre Karl Péladeau, CEO; Pierre Francoeur, President;
- Products: Broadcasting; Magazines; Films
- Services: Broadcasting; Film production Publishing; Audiovisual production
- Parent: Quebecor Media (99.97% voting interest); Rogers Communications (0.03% voting interest)
- Subsidiaries: TVA Films; TVA Productions; TVA Publishing
- Website: www.groupetva.ca

Groupe TVA Inc. is a Canadian communications company with operations in broadcasting, publishing and production. It was founded as Télé-Métropole Corporation in 1960, and owned CFTM-TV, Montreal's first privately owned francophone station. It changed its legal name to Groupe TVA inc. on February 17, 1998. Quebecor Media holds voting control of the company through near-complete control of Groupe TVA's Class A shares; only the non-voting Class B shares are currently publicly traded.

Groupe TVA owns and operates the TVA network, the largest private French language television network in Canada and the most watched television network in Quebec. It also operates seven specialty channels, available via subscription television across Canada, and a motion picture division. TVA and its specialty channels have a 69% share of revenue in the French speaking market. The total value of the private Francophone sector is $491 million of which $349 million goes to TVA.

== Revenue ==
Channel Name	Revenue (2013)
TVA Channel	$79 million
ILLICO SUR DEMANDE	57.221 m
Total Specialty Channels	$112.636 million
ADDIK	10.594 m
Argent	2.621 m
Évasion	12.215 m
Canal Indigo	8.192 m
Le Canal Nouvelles	32.248 m
Casa	8.094 m
Témoin	3.526 m
Prise 2	7.417 m
TVA Sports	15.020 m
Yoopa	4.77 m
Sun News Network	7.939 m
Groupe TVA Total	249 m

=== Conventional television ===
- TVA
  - CFTM-DT Montreal
  - CFCM-DT Quebec City
  - CFER-DT Rimouski
  - CHLT-DT Sherbrooke
  - CHEM-DT Trois-Rivières
  - CJPM-DT Saguenay
  - CKXT-DT Toronto (defunct)

=== Specialty television ===
As of 2015, all of Groupe TVA's specialty television assets are French-language due to the shutdown of the English-language Sun News Network.

Current

- Addik - film and television series
- Canal Indigo - PPV movie service
- LCN - 24 hour news
- CASA - lifestyle and real estate
- Évasion - travel and adventure
- Prise 2 - retro film and television series
- QUB - public affairs and social issues, TV simulcast of Qub Radio (launched January 11, 2024, replaced Yoopa)
- Témoin - crime dramas and true crime
- TVA Sports - sports
- Zeste - food-related entertainment and lifestyle programming

Former

- Argent - business and financial news (channel ceased operations April 30, 2016)
- The Cave - men lifestyle (51% as managing partner and channel sold to Shaw Media on April 25, 2012, now owned by Corus Entertainment as of April 1, 2016)
- Sun News Network - news and opinion (51% as managing partner and channel ceased operations February 13, 2015)
- Télé Achats - infomercials (channel ceased operations August 1, 2012)
- Yoopa - children's (pre-school) programs (channel ceased operations January 11, 2024)

== Other assets ==
- TVA Films (Film production and distributor)
- TVA Productions (Television production)
- TVA Publishing (magazine publisher, distributes over 70 titles)
- Télé Inter-Rives (Independent broadcaster, owns 45% stake)

== See also ==
- Quebecor Media
