= History2 (Canadian TV channel) =

- Country: Canada
- Broadcast area: Nationwide
- Headquarters: Toronto, Ontario

Programming
- Picture format: 1080i (HDTV) (2013–present); 480i (SDTV) (2001–present)

Ownership
- Owner: Corus Entertainment (branding licensed from A&E Networks)
- Parent: Men TV General Partnership
- Sister channels: History; Historia

History
- Launched: September 7, 2001; 24 years ago
- Former names: mentv (2001–2010); The Cave (2010–2012); H2 (2012–2019)

History2 is a Canadian English language discretionary specialty channel owned by Men TV General Partnership, a subsidiary of Corus Entertainment dedicated to airing historic and non-historical programming of military, science, and technology interest.

The channel went on the air on September 7, 2001 as mentv, an men's general interest channel, by its owner Canwest before rebranding to The Cave in 2008. After several ownership changes, the channel was rebranded to the Canadian version of H2 in 2012 with the brand licensed from A&E Networks before adopting its current name in 2019.

== History ==
Original logo as mentv, 2001–2010

Logo as The Cave, 2010-2012

In November 2000, Groupe TVA and Canwest (through its subsidiary Global Television Network Inc.) were granted approval from the Canadian Radio-television and Telecommunications Commission (CRTC) to launch a television channel called Men TV, described as "a national English-language Category 1 specialty television service dedicated to men's lifestyle. It will provide programming related to the luxury market, the gourmet market, men's beauty and fitness, the book and music market, outdoor adventures and leisure sports, from a Canadian men's perspective."

The channel launched on September 7, 2001, under a slightly modified name, mentv. Despite Canwest's 49% minority interest in the service, Canwest was the managing partner of the channel from its inception until September 2008, when managing operations were handed over to Groupe TVA, who owned a 51% stake in the service.

Throughout its history as mentv, the channel maintained a programming slate of general interest programming aimed at a male audience. Programming included series focusing on themes such as crime and mystery, cuisine, leisure sports such as extreme sports and fishing, technology, and more. Due in part to the channel's licence requirements, the majority of the programming were documentary, reality series, talk shows, and other such non-scripted programming. Scripted programming such as films, variety shows, comedies, and television dramas did also air on the channel, however.

In 2004, a complaint by the Canadian Association of Broadcasters on behalf of Canwest was filed against the Canadian carriage of the U.S. cable network Spike, which had recently relaunched from TNN with a male-skewing entertainment format. It argued that the network's carriage in Canada would harm mentv due to an alleged overlap between its programming scope with it and several other Canadian channels. The CRTC dismissed the complaint, arguing that Spike did not directly compete with mentv because it was merely an entertainment network aimed at a male audience, while mentv was oriented primarily towards lifestyle programs targeting a male audience.

On August 2, 2010, with little marketing initiative behind it and little notice from the press, mentv was quietly rebranded The Cave, while maintaining mentv's programming strategy of a lifestyle service aimed at men. On October 27, 2010, Shaw Communications gained a 49% stake in the channel as a result of its acquisition of Canwest.

On December 22, 2011, Groupe TVA announced its intention to sell its share of The Cave and Mystery TV to Shaw Communications, giving Shaw full control of the two channels. It was revealed in regulatory documents, that the transaction for The Cave was valued at $2,000,000. The deal was approved by the CRTC on April 25, 2012.

On May 30, 2012, Shaw Media announced that it would be launching a Canadian version of the history-focused American channel, H2, on August 27, 2012. While no official word was made by Shaw Media, It was speculated that the channel would be a rebranded version of The Cave. Indeed, The Cave was rebranded as H2 on August 27, 2012.

On May 29, 2013, Shaw Media launched a high definition simulcast of H2. It is currently available on Eastlink, Shaw Direct, Shaw Cable & Bell Fibe TV.

In November 2015, it was announced that the U.S. H2 channel would be replaced by Viceland—a new network programmed by Vice Media. With Vice previously announcing a Canadian partnership with Rogers Communications, who rebranded The Biography Channel to a Canadian version of Viceland, and A&E Networks stating that the H2 brand would continue to be used in international markets, the Canadian channel was not affected by these changes.

On April 1, 2016, Corus Entertainment acquired Shaw Media.

In August 2019, the channel has been rebranded as History2, as with other current existing H2 channels around the world.

== Programming ==
When launched as mentv and later renamed to The Cave, this channel combined male-friendly entertainment with lifestyle programming targeting male audiences. Notable series also included its music program Men of Music, which profiled 26 exceptional men who have made tremendous contributions to Canadian music.

Since its rebrand as History2, this channel carries documentary programming, original historical and popular science documentaries, and pseudoscientific entertainment programs while maintaining its status as a male-oriented television service.

Following the retirement of CRTC's genre protection rules in 2015, History2 began to air some reruns of shows from other Corus-owned channels including Canadian-produced shows to fulfill Canadian content quotas.

=== Noted series ===
- 10 Things You Don't Know About
- Aftermath
- Blowdown
- Canadian Made (reruns after ended)
- Greatest Tank Battles
- Ice Pilots NWT
- Modern Marvels
- The Universe
- Top Gear (US)
- Top Guns
- William Shatner's Weird or What?
- Note: Series list is current as of 2013.

== See also ==
- OLN - A similar channel that was originally an outdoor lifestyle drifted to the men's general interest channel in the mid-2010s
