= History (Canadian TV channel) =

Canadian English-language specialty TV channel

The History Channel
- Country: Canada
- Broadcast area: Nationwide
- Headquarters: Toronto, Ontario

Programming
- Picture format: 1080i HDTV (downscaled to letterboxed 480i for the SDTV feed)
- Timeshift service: The History Channel East; The History Channel West

Ownership
- Owner: Alliance Atlantis (1998-2008); Canwest (2008-2010); Shaw Media (2010-2016); Corus Entertainment (2016-present) (branding licensed from A&E Networks)
- Parent: History Television Inc.
- Sister channels: Historia; History2

History
- Launched: October 17, 1997, 27 years ago
- Former names: History Television (1997–2012)

Links
- Website: history.ca

Availability

Streaming media
- StackTV: Internet Protocol television
- RiverTV: Channel 7

The History Channel (also known as History) is a Canadian English-language discretionary specialty channel that broadcasts programming related to history and historical fiction. It is owned by History Television, Inc., a subsidiary of Corus Entertainment.

History was launched on October 17, 1997, as History Television under the ownership of Alliance Atlantis. Through various ownership changes, the channel adopted its current name in 2012, with the History Channel branding used under a licensing agreement with A+E Networks. The History Channel operates two time-shifted feeds: East (Eastern Time) and West (Pacific Time). The West Coast feed was launched on September 1, 2006.

== History ==
Licensed by the Canadian Radio-television and Telecommunications Commission (CRTC) on September 4, 1996, as The History and Entertainment Network, the channel was originally owned by Alliance Atlantis Communications and launched as History Television on October 17, 1997.

On January 18, 2008, a joint venture between Canwest and Goldman Sachs Alternatives known as CW Media bought Alliance Atlantis and gained AAC's interest in History Television. On October 8, 2009, Canwest launched a high definition simulcast of History Television. History Television HD initially only had one national feed operating from the Eastern Time Zone that was available through all major TV providers in Canada.

On October 27, 2010, ownership changed again as Shaw Communications gained control of History Television as a result of its acquisition of Canwest and Goldman Sachs' interest in CW Media. On May 30, 2012, Shaw Media announced that History Television would be rebranded as a Canadian version of U.S. cable channel History on August 12, 2012, through a wider licensing agreement with A+E Networks. Fellow Shaw network, The Cave, was also rebranded as a Canadian version of spin-off network H2.

On April 1, 2016, History and its sister channel H2 were sold to Corus Entertainment. An HD feed for the network in western Canada was launched on September 18, 2019. In January 2022, the network converted its imaging to the current American logo introduced in the fall of 2021, and like the American network, it uses "History" and "The History Channel" interchangeably.

== Programming ==
The channel's programming includes documentaries, reality shows, films, and human interest series. In addition to shows acquired from its American counterpart, History also produces and commissions several original programs of its own, including Restoration Garage, Yukon Gold, and Vikings.

The channel also frequently commissions original documentary television films on historical topics, with noteworthy examples having included the World War II documentaries The Real Inglorious Bastards and Cheating Hitler: Surviving the Holocaust, the four-part Black Canadian history series BLK, An Origin Story, and the Indigenous Canadian history True Story.

Under the History Television branding, the network also aired a special called Fact & Film, which shows a program on a topic and then a movie on the same subject.

== Logo ==
First logo as History Television (October 17, 1997 - May 3, 2008)

Second and final logo as History Television (May 3, 2008 - August 12, 2012)

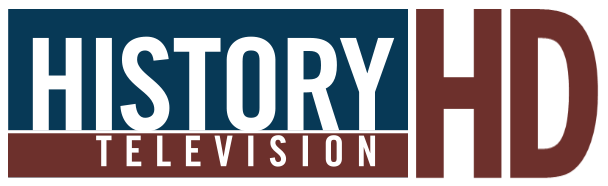
HD logo for History Television (October 8, 2009 - August 12, 2012)

First logo as History (August 12, 2012 - May 31, 2015)

Second logo as History (June 1, 2015 - January 2022)

== See also ==
- List of documentary channels
- List of Canadian television channels
- Historia, French-Canadian TV channel
- History (American TV channel)
