= Témoin =

Canadian French language specialty channel

- Country: Canada
- Broadcast area: National
- Headquarters: Montreal, Quebec

Programming
- Picture format: 480i (SDTV); 1080i (HDTV)

Ownership
- Owner: Groupe TVA

History
- Launched: May 2, 2011
- Former names: Mlle (2011-2013); Moi et Cie (2013-2024)

Links
- Website: (in French)

Témoin (Witness, formerly known as Mlle and Moi et Cie) is a Canadian French-language discretionary specialty channel owned by Groupe TVA. The network primarily broadcasts crime dramas and true crime programs.

== History ==
Mlle logo

The channel launched on May 2, 2011 as Mlle, a channel devoted to lifestyle and entertainment programming targeting women. On February 1, 2013, the network was rebranded as Moi & Cie (later stylized as Moi et Cie), an extension of Groupe TVA's magazine of the same name.

Final logo as Moi et Cie

On April 9, 2024, after having slowly pivoted to airing such programming, Moi et Cie was rebranded as Témoin—which would be focused on crime-related programming, including true crime documentaries, and crime-related series (such as police procedurals) and films.

== See also ==
- Crime & Investigation, a similar English-language channel that Groupe TVA had owned a stake in at launch.
