= Addik =

Canadian French-language pay TV channel

- Country: Canada
- Broadcast area: National
- Headquarters: Montreal, Quebec

Programming
- Language: French
- Picture format: 1080i HDTV (downscaled to letterboxed 480i for the SDTV feed)

Ownership
- Owner: Groupe TVA

History
- Launched: October 21, 2004
- Former names: Mystère (2004-2010) addikTV (2010-2022)

Links
- Website: www.tvaplus.ca/addik

Addik (stylised as ADDIK; formerly known as addikTV and Mystère) is a Canadian French-language specialty channel owned by Groupe TVA, a division of Quebecor Media. The channel is devoted primarily to French-language drama programming focusing on mystery, suspense, and thriller TV series and films. The name of the channel is derived from the English word "addiction".

== History ==
In November 2000, a consortium consisting of Groupe TVA (45.05%), CanWest (45.0%), and Rogers Communications (9.9%), were granted approval by the Canadian Radio-television and Telecommunications Commission (CRTC) to launch a television channel called 13^{ème} Rue, described as "a national French-language Category 1 specialty television service consisting of mystery, fantasy suspense and horror."

Prior to the channel's launch in September 2004, the CRTC approved an application by Groupe TVA to acquire both CanWest's and Rogers' shares in the service, later tentatively renamed as Canal Mystère. The channel launched shortly thereafter as Mystère on October 21, 2004, focusing on mystery, horror, and fantasy programming.

In June 2010, Groupe TVA announced that Mystère would be renamed addikTV on August 23, 2010. The channel's focus changed to drama programming focusing on the mystery, suspense, and thriller genres. Prior to the renaming, roughly two years, Mystère began implementing changes to its schedule to include more mystery, suspense, and thriller programming. This was considered the first stage in the upcoming rebranding process as addikTV.

== addikTV HD ==
On October 13, 2008, addikTV launched a high definition feed, simulcasting the standard definition feed. Originally known as Mystère HD, it was renamed addikTV HD on August 23, 2010, to coincide with the rebranding of the standard-definition feed.

== Logos ==
2004–2010
2010–2022
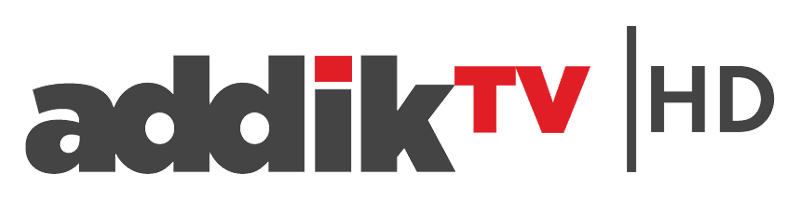
Former HD logo

2022–present
