= Québecor Média =

Canadian media company

Québecor Média Inc.
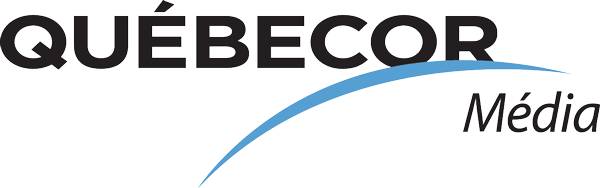
- Type: Subsidiary
- Industry: Mass media
- Founded: 2000; 26 years ago
- Headquarters: Montreal, Quebec, Canada
- Key people: Pierre Dion (chairman); Pierre Karl Péladeau (president and CEO)
- Products: Cable television Newspapers
- Services: Broadcasting; Film production Publishing
- Parent: Québecor
- Divisions: Groupe TVA
- Website: www.quebecor.com

Québecor Média Inc. is a Canadian media conglomerate that owns a wide array of media outlets, as well as an internet service provider.

== History ==
In 1983 Québecor purchased the Winnipeg Sun newspaper, which had been independently run. The newspaper was later sold to the Postmedia chain.

In August 2000, Québecor Média bought Vidéotron for CA$4.9 billion. In May 2001, the Canadian Radio-television and Telecommunications Commission (CRTC) approved the transfer of broadcasting licenses from Vidéotron to Québecor Média. Also in 2001, Quebecor Media bought Groupe TVA.

As of June 2018, Québecor Inc. fully owns Québecor Média, while CDP Capital d’Amérique Investissements Inc. (a subsidiary of Caisse de dépôt et placement du Québec, the provincial pension fund) previously owned an 18.9% share. On May 8, 2018, Quebecor had announced its intent to buy out the remainder of the Caisse's stake for $1.69 billion in cash and stock.

== Assets ==
- Groupe TVA (broadcasting, publishing & production)
- Canoe Inc. (internet websites including Canoe.ca/Canoe.com portal and Archambault.ca)
- Vidéotron (cellular, cable television and internet service provider)
- MediaPages (print and online directories)
- TVA Publishing Inc. (largest magazine publishing company in Quebec)
- Québecor Média Book Group (book publishing companies)
- Distribution Select (distributor of CDs and videos)
- Le SuperClub Vidéotron (Movie rental stores)
- Gestion Studios Bloobuzz S. E. C (a video games publisher)
- QMI press agency (news agency)

== Corporate governance ==
- Pierre Karl Péladeau, President and CEO

Board of directors:

- Pierre Dion, Chairman
- Jean La Couture, Vice Chairman

== See also ==
- Torstar
  - Metroland Media Group
  - Star Media Group
- Postmedia Network
- The Woodbridge Company and CTVglobemedia
