= List of television stations in Quebec =

This is a list of broadcast television stations serving cities in the Canadian province of Quebec. Digital channels as of November 2011.

City of licence	Analog channel	Digital channel	Virtual channel	Callsign	Network	Notes
Baie-Saint-Paul		13	13.1	CIMT-DT-4	TVA	
Baie-Saint-Paul		26	26.1	CFTF-DT-10	Noovo	
Baie-Saint-Paul		36	2.1	CKRT-DT-1	Ici R-C	
Baie-Comeau		9	9.1	CFTF-DT-5	Noovo	
Baie-Trinité		12	12.1	CIVF-DT	T-Q	satellite of CIVM-DT Montreal
Cabano		12	12.1	CFTF-DT-3	Noovo	
Cabano		21	5.1	CKRT-DT-4	Ici R-C	
Cabano		23	3.1	CIMT-DT-8	TVA	
Carleton		29	44.1	CFTF-DT-11	Noovo	
Carleton		5	5.1	CHAU-DT	TVA	
Carleton		15	15.1	CIVK-DT	T-Q	satellite of CIVM-DT Montreal
Chandler		26	6.1	CHAU-DT-4	TVA	
Chapeau		23	23.1	CIVP-DT	T-Q	satellite of CIVM-DT Montreal
Chicoutimi		24	6.1	CJPM-DT	TVA	Saguenay
Cloridorme		11	11.1	CHAU-DT-8	TVA	
Dégelis		25	2.1	CKRT-DT-2	Ici R-C	
Forestville		4	4.1	CFTF-DT-4	Noovo	
Gascons		32	32.1	CIVK-DT-1	T-Q	
Gaspé		34	35.1	CIVK-DT-3	T-Q	
Gaspé		30	58.1	CFTF-DT-9	Noovo	
Gaspé		7	7.1	CHAU-DT-6	Noovo	
Gatineau		30	30.1	CIVO-DT	T-Q	satellite of CIVM-TV Montreal
Gatineau		34	34.1	CFGS-DT	Noovo	
Gatineau		32	40.1	CHOT-DT	TVA	
Grand-Fonds		31	31.1	CIVB-DT-1	T-Q	
L'Anse-a-Valleau,		12	12.1	CHAU-DT-9	TVA	
Les Escoumins		33	33.1	CFTF-DT-8	Noovo	
Les Escoumins		35	57.1	CIMT-DT-7	TVA	
Montreal		10	10.1	CFTM-DT	TVA	
Montreal		12	12.1	CFCF-DT	CTV	
Montreal		19	2.1	CBFT-DT	Ici R-C	
Montreal		21	6.1	CBMT-DT	CBC	
Montreal		26	17.1	CIVM-DT	T-Q	
Montreal		29	29.1	CFTU-DT	Independent station	Savoir média
Montreal		35	35.1	CFJP-DT	Noovo	
Montreal		15	15.1	CKMI-DT-1	Global	satellite of CKMI-TV Quebec City
Montreal		17	62.1	CJNT-DT	Citytv	
Montreal		31	47.1	CFHD-DT	Independent station	ICI Télévision
Parent	15			CH4458	Noovo	
Percé		15	40.1	CIVK-DT-2	T-Q	
Percé		13	13.1	CHAU-DT-5	TVA	
Port-Daniel		10	10.1	CHAU-DT-3	TVA	
Quebec City		35	2.1	CFAP-DT	Noovo	
Quebec City		17	4.1	CFCM-DT	TVA	
Quebec City		25	11.1	CBVT-DT	Ici R-C	
Quebec City		15	15.1	CIVQ-DT	T-Q	satellite of CIVM-TV ch. 17 Montreal
Quebec City		20	20.1	CKMI-DT	Global	
Quebec City		10	10.3	CHMG-TV	Independent station	Télémag
Radisson	13			CJBJ-TV	Noovo	
Rimouski		27	2.1	CJBR-DT	Ici R-C	
Rimouski		11	11.1	CFER-DT	TVA	
Rimouski		27	18.1	CJPC-DT	Noovo	
Rimouski		22	22.1	CIVB-DT	T-Q	satellite of CIVM-DT Montreal
Rivière-au-Renard		4	4.1	CHAU-DT-7	TVA	
Rivière-du-Loup		13	6.1	CIMT-DT-6	TVA	LPTV repeater serving a dead zone in channel 9's reception area
Rivière-du-Loup		9	9.1	CIMT-DT	TVA	
Rivière-du-Loup		11	11.1	CFTF-DT-6	Noovo	LPTV repeater serving a dead zone in channel 29's reception area
Rivière-du-Loup		29	29.1	CFTF-DT	Noovo	
Roberval	10			CJPM-TV-1	TVA	
Rouyn-Noranda		8	8.1	CIVA-DT-1	T-Q	satellite of CIVM-DT Montreal
Rouyn-Noranda		13	13.1	CFEM-DT	TVA	
Rouyn-Noranda		20	20.1	CFVS-DT-1	Noovo	satellite of CFVS-DT Val-d'Or
Saguenay		13	4.1	CFRS-DT	Noovo	
Saguenay		24	6.1	CJPM-DT	TVA	
Saguenay		8	8.1	CIVV-DT	T-Q	satellite of CIVM-DT Montreal
Saguenay		12	12.1	CKTV-DT	Ici R-C	
Saint-Urbain		38	5.1	CIMT-DT-5	TVA	
Sainte-Marguerite-Marie		3	3.1	CHAU-DT-1	TVA	
Sept-Îles	5			CFER-TV-2	TVA	satellite of CFER-TV ch. 11 Rimouski
Sept-Îles		7	7.1	CFTF-DT-7	Noovo	
Sept-Îles		9	9.1	CIVG-DT	T-Q	satellite of CIVM-DT Montreal
Sherbrooke		7	7.1	CHLT-DT	TVA	
Sherbrooke		9	9.1	CKSH-DT	Ici R-C	
Sherbrooke		11	11.1	CKMI-DT-2	Global	
Sherbrooke		24	24.1	CIVS-DT	T-Q	satellite of CIVM-DT Montreal
Sherbrooke		30	30.1	CFKS-DT	Noovo	
Trois-Pistoles		13	13.1	CIMT-DT-2	TVA	
Trois-Pistoles		17	17.1	CFTF-DT-2	Noovo	
Trois-Rivières		8	8.1	CHEM-DT	TVA	
Trois-Rivières		28	13.1	CKTM-DT	Ici R-C	
Trois-Rivières		34	16.1	CFKM-DT	Noovo	
Trois-Rivières		33	45.1	CIVC-DT	T-Q	satellite of CIVM-DT Montreal
Val-d'Or		10	10.1	CFEM-DT-1	TVA	satellite of CFEM-DT Rouyn-Noranda
Val-d'Or		12	12.1	CIVA-DT	T-Q	satellite of CIVM-DT Montreal
Val-d'Or		25	25.1	CFVS-DT	Noovo	

== Defunct stations ==
- Channel 30: CFVO-TV - TVA - Hull

== See also ==
- Media in Canada
- Ottawa-licensed stations in the list of television stations in Ontario; the majority of these transmit from Ryan Tower at Camp Fortune, Quebec.
- List of television stations in Canada
