= Duopoly (broadcasting) =

Ownership of multiple broadcast stations in the same community

A duopoly (or twinstick, referring to "stick" as jargon for a radio tower) is a situation in television and radio broadcasting in which two or more stations in the same city or community share common ownership.

== United States ==
In the United States, the practice of duopolies has been frowned upon when using public airwaves, on the premise that it gives too much influence to one company. However, rules governing radio stations are less restrictive than those for television, allowing as many as eight radio stations under common ownership in the largest U.S. media markets. Ownership of television stations with overlapping coverage areas was normally not allowed in the United States prior to 2002, even those that were not duopolies under the present legal definition, by way of being located in separate albeit adjacent markets; this required broadcasters to apply for cross-ownership waivers in some cases to retain full-power stations based in adjacent markets. Non-commercial educational broadcasters, mainly those that were members of the Public Broadcasting Service (PBS), were the only licensees allowed to sign-on or acquire a second television station that did not repeat the parent station's signal in the same market where they already owned a station (some of these acquired stations were originally licensed as commercial outlets).

On August 5, 1999, the Federal Communications Commission voted 4–1 to allow common ownership of two television stations within a single market by one company, so long as eight unique station owners remain in the market once the duopoly is formed, and the four highest-rated stations (based on local monthly viewership reports for the market) remain under separate ownership. The FCC only requires the severance of an existing duopoly in which a once lower-rated station falls within the ratings criteria that prohibits such ownership over time if an ownership transaction is under review (such as a piecemeal or group sale of stations, or necessary license transfers during an ownership transaction involving the stations' existing owner); a company is required to sell one of the stations in the duopoly to another licensee if it is no longer compliant with one or both provisions.

Currently, an entity is permitted to own up to two television stations in the same media market if either the service areas of the stations do not overlap, or at least one of the stations is not rated among the top four rated stations in the media market. There is no limit on the number of television stations a single entity may own as long as the stations group collectively reaches no more than 39% of U.S. households.

Once a duopoly is formed, the acquiring company takes over the operations of its new property. The operations of the two stations are usually consolidated into one facility, depending on the size and age of the facility chosen to house their operations. Since the stations involved in the duopoly are not restricted by FCC law from consolidating their operations, duplicative jobs at one of the stations are often terminated as the consolidation takes effect.

News departments are also often consolidated into a singular operation, with anchoring and reporting staffs from the respective stations often being folded into one unit, subject to hiring determinations made by management; anchors and reporters are usually shared between the two stations, though in some cases, certain anchors may be employed to appear only on each station's own newscasts. In some cases (like with WHDH and WLVI in Boston, Massachusetts, when the former's owner Sunbeam Television formed a duopoly with WLVI after purchasing the station from Tribune Broadcasting in 2006), the junior partner's news department is shut down completely, with the senior partner subsequently taking over production of its news content using only their existing staff. In many cases, news programming on a junior partner is structured to avoid direct competition with a senior partner affiliate of either ABC, NBC or CBS (one notable exception involves WTTV and WXIN in Indianapolis, which carry competing morning and evening newscasts as Tribune Broadcasting opted to launch a separate slate of newscasts for WTTV when it became a CBS affiliate in January 2015, rather than shift those seen on sister Fox affiliate WXIN to the station; WXIN and WTTV largely maintain their own anchors, but share a news department and most reporting staff). This situation is uncommon in duopolies involving only Big Three affiliates, as stations affiliated with those networks are more inclined to carry newscasts in overlapping time periods in order to fulfill local programming requirements included in affiliation agreements.

Certain syndicated programs are also shared between the stations, in the form of either same-day repeat airings of programs seen on the one which holds primary rights or separated runs of programs that air on each station, although each station maintains separate syndication inventories as well. The junior partner, unless it is affiliated with a major network, may also be used to carry network (and occasionally, first-run syndicated) programs that the senior partner is unable to broadcast because of long-form breaking news or severe weather coverage or a locally produced special airing in a scheduled program's normal timeslot, or in the case of certain non-prime time network programs, because the senior partner chooses not to carry it on its regular schedule to carry other scheduled programming.

Although the FCC bars common ownership of any of the four major broadcast networks (ABC, NBC, CBS and Fox), it does not prohibit duopolies involving stations affiliated individually with any two of them, unless both are among the four highest-rated in the market at the time of a sale. As such, several Big Four duopolies exist based on certain market conditions that originally allowed them to be formed under the criteria (such as a company having acquired one of the major network stations as a low-rated affiliate of a smaller network prior to an affiliation switch or the ratings of a non-English station placing among the top four over a Big Four network affiliate). While most duopolies are made up of a senior partner that is affiliated with one of the four major networks and an affiliate of a minor network (such as The CW and MyNetworkTV) or an independent station as the junior partner, those in which both stations are major network affiliates typically involve a Fox station (which serves as the junior partner in all but a few instances) and an ABC, CBS or NBC affiliate, with some limited arrangements where two Big Three affiliates are jointly owned or managed.

One of the few markets where two major network duopolies exist in some form is Jacksonville, Florida, where two companies once owned the licenses of the Big Four stations they respectively controlled. In 2000, the Gannett Company, owner of NBC affiliate WTLV, purchased ABC affiliate WJXX, which had struggled in the local ratings since its sign-on in February 1997 (when it took the ABC affiliation from WJKS through a group affiliation deal with the Allbritton Communications Company) due to its status as a relatively new station and issues with signal interference from PBS station WJCT on its Mediacom cable channel slot. The following year, Clear Channel Communications created a legal duopoly involving its existing Fox affiliate WAWS (now WFOX-TV) and WTEV-TV (now WJAX-TV), a UPN affiliate that it had been managing under a local marketing agreement since 1994; WTEV's viewership gradually rose after it became a CBS affiliate in July 2002, putting it in the top four threshold with WAWS, resulting in Newport Television – upon purchasing the Clear Channel television group in 2007 – restructuring the operation as a virtual duopoly by selling WTEV to shell licensee High Plains Broadcasting (WFOX and WJAX are now respectively owned by the Cox Media Group and Bayshore Television, LLC, but remain under common management through JSA/SSA in which WJAX is the junior partner).

The use of digital subchannels has been termed an "instant duopoly," because of the ease by which a single digital station can deliver multiple channels of programming from different networks at the same time. One station can carry four or more standard definition digital channels; multiple high definition feeds typically require too large a bitrate size to be carried on different subchannels of the same station simultaneously without loss of image quality.

=== 2017 changes ===
On November 20, 2017, in its reconsideration order to the Quadrennial Regulatory Review regarding media ownership, the FCC voted to make significant changes, particularly to local television ownership. In its decision, the FCC eliminated the "Eight-Voices Test" requirement, allowing media companies to form duopolies regardless of the number of full-powered stations licensed to each market. It also allows media companies to form duopolies comprising two of the four highest-rated stations in a particular market, provided that companies can prove to the FCC that the transaction "would serve the public interest, convenience, and necessity," and that it is necessary "due to specific circumstances in a local market or with respect to a specific transaction on a case-by-case basis."

The said changes were put into practice on two occasions:

- On May 1, 2018, KDLT-TV owner Gray Television announced that it is buying KSFY-TV from Red River Broadcasting, despite both stations ranking within the four highest-rated stations in the Sioux Falls market. Gray obtained a waiver from the FCC, citing that KSFY would be in a stronger position if its resources are to be combined with KDLT, and that a duopoly for the said stations would fulfill "a dire need for an effective competitor" in the market, given that rival station KELO-TV ranks higher in the ratings. The sale was approved by the FCC on September 24, 2019, and was completed the following day.
- On May 8, 2023, KSWB-TV owner Nexstar Media Group announced that it is buying independent station KUSI-TV for $35 million. The transaction would create the first legal duopoly in San Diego – the largest US market that was ineligible to do so under the 1999 "Eight-Voices Test" set by the FCC, owing to its proximity with stations in Tijuana along the international border with Mexico. The transaction was completed on August 31.

=== Virtual duopolies ===
Some broadcasting companies have used loopholes to establish duopolies in smaller markets by way of a local marketing agreement, shared services agreement or joint sales agreement; where a station effectively brokers its entire airtime to the owner of another station in the market, which becomes responsible for handling its programming and advertising sales – and in effect, operations. These are termed as "virtual duopolies" as the station's license is held by one company, while its operations are handled by another. Through a 2014 FCC ruling, joint sales agreements in which the senior partner sells a minimum of 15% of the advertising time for its junior partner are counted toward ownership caps.

Some larger broadcasting companies have controversially built business models around the practice, by funding the acquisition of stations by what are effectively shill companies or shell corporations; for example, Sinclair Broadcast Group operates the stations of Cunningham Broadcasting and Deerfield Media under LMAs, JSAs, or SSAs. Nearly all of Cunningham's stock is held by trusts in the name of Sinclair's founders and owners, the Smith family. Similarly, Nexstar Media Group funds the purchase of stations by Mission Broadcasting and Vaughan Media, which forms duopolies with their stations through shared services agreements with a Nexstar station. In some cases, the senior partner may acquire a station's physical assets and intellectual property (such as the station's facilities and programming rights), but spin off the license itself to a shell corporation and enter into an agreement to operate the station, making it the de facto owner, but not the legal owner. Following the purchase, the station's operations and programming are often merged into that of its new parent station. Similarly, a company that acquires an existing legal duopoly that is no longer complies with FCC rules on duopoly ownership may spin off the junior partner station's license to a shell, rather than sell one of the stations to a licensee that would also assume operational responsibilities, allowing the restructured duopoly to remain under common operation through a resulting management agreement.

In some cases, the use of an adjacent-market city of license has been used on a secondary station to avoid a limit on the number of stations controlled by the same broadcaster in the same market. Occasionally, those arrangements cross international borders. For instance, radio station WLYK in Cape Vincent, New York in the United States is operated from the Canadian studios of Kingston, Ontario's CIKR-FM, a broadcaster already at the two-station limit in its own market, under an LMA. Broadcasters such as Entravision have often entered into local marketing agreements with Mexican border stations (such as Tecate's XHDTV-TDT for content directed at San Diego).

=== Failing station waivers ===
It is also possible to obtain a "failing station waiver," which can exempt a broadcaster from some portion of the existing restrictions on common ownership in order to acquire and operate a station which otherwise would be economically non-viable or would be forced to cease operations.

Requests for failing station waivers have historically met with variable reception; in general, the FCC views requests favorably if:

- The failing station consistently received less than 4% of all local all-day audience share;
- the station is in poor financial condition, normally operating at a loss for at least the previous three years;
- the merger will produce public interest benefits, and;
- the in-market buyer is the only suitable candidate as a sale to an out-of-market buyer would result in an artificially depressed price.

Waivers under these criteria were granted to sell WASV-TV in Asheville to Media General, owner of CBS affiliate WSPA-TV in that market, and KWBA in Tucson to the Journal Broadcast Group, owner of that market's ABC affiliate KGUN-TV. A similar waiver was refused to KNIN-TV in Boise as the station, a CW affiliate at the time the waiver application was filed, appeared to have reasonable prospects of financial break-even without a takeover by Journal-owned ABC affiliate KIVI-TV; that decision was subsequently appealed, with the waiver being granted upon further review (Journal Broadcast Group would eventually be required to sell KNIN in 2014, as the station's financial condition improved enough in its post-2011 existence as a Fox affiliate to make it unsuitable for the E. W. Scripps Company – which was in the process of purchasing Journal's broadcasting unit in a deal in which Journal simultaneously merged with Scripps' publishing unit – to acquire it under a renewed waiver, in addition to the fact that it could not acquire it legally as the market had fewer than eight unique owners).

=== Low-power TV stations ===
Low-power and Class A television stations are not subject to ownership caps in the United States, as their broadcast signals do not reach as many homes as full-power stations. In areas with high cable television penetration, this distinction is essentially meaningless. LPTV stations were also exempt from digital television transition requirements imposed on full-service broadcasters upon the June 2009 digital conversion.

As such, low-power stations can also be formed to create duopolies; for instance, Weigel Broadcasting maintains triopolies in three markets surrounding the southern part of Lake Michigan (Chicago, Illinois; Milwaukee, Wisconsin; and South Bend, Indiana) using a combination of full-power and low-power television stations. In Chicago, it maintains one full-power signal (CW-affiliated station WCIU-TV) and two low-power stations (MeTV flagship station WWME-CD and independent station WMEU-CD). In Milwaukee, Weigel has two full-power stations (CBS affiliate WDJT-TV and full-power independent station WMLW-TV) and two low-power stations (MeTV station WBME-CD and Telemundo affiliate WYTU-LD, the latter stations of which use subchannels of WDJT as its main conduit for full-power carriage). Weigel also takes advantage of digital subchannel broadcasting heavily in addition to MeTV, it also owns MeTV+, Heroes & Icons, Start TV, Catchy Comedy, Movies!, and Story Television, all of which air on its stations, in addition to other station groups; the company had also previously executed time share agreements on other subchannels with ethnic broadcasters, and in Milwaukee, a local real estate agency to air programming.

A similar situation exists in Lima, Ohio, where Block Communications controls a quadropoly of stations owned by itself (WLIO, a full-powered NBC affiliate which also carries Fox and MyNetworkTV on a digital subchannel) and low-power stations owned by West Central Ohio Broadcasting, Inc. (which owns ABC affiliate WPNM-LD/WOHL-CD, and CBS affiliate WAMS-LD) under an LMA. One of the latter company's heads, Allan J. Block, is the chairman of Block Communications. The group is the sole over-air provider of secular network television programming in the Lima market, though area cable systems also carry out-of-market affiliates from Toledo, Columbus and Dayton. (All of the Block owned or operated stations have a pending sale to Gray Media expected to close in the fourth quarter of 2025).

=== Radio stations ===
As mentioned above, current FCC rules limit the number of radio stations a single entity may own in a certain market. As of May 2020, these are the limitations on radio ownership in a certain market, according to the FCC website:

- In a radio market with 45 or more stations, an entity may own up to eight radio stations, no more than five of which may be on the same band (AM or FM).
- In a radio market with between 30 and 44 stations, up to seven stations are allowed under common ownership, no more than four of which could be on AM or FM.
- In a radio market with between 15 and 29 stations, an entity may own up to six stations, no more than four of which may be on the same band.
- In a radio market with 14 or fewer radio stations, an entity may own up to five radio stations, of which no more than three of which may be on the same band, as long as the entity does not own more than half of the stations in that market.

Unlike television, there is no limit on the percentage of the population to that an entity may reach.

== Canada ==
=== Radio ===
In radio, Canadian Radio-television and Telecommunications Commission (CRTC) policy generally allows broadcasters to operate no more than three radio stations in any given market, of which no more than two may be on the same radio band — that is, a company may own two AM stations and an FM station, or two FM stations and an AM station, but may not own three AMs or three FMs. However, in major metropolitan markets where a large number of radio stations are already broadcasting, the limit is increased to four stations with a maximum of two on each band. A company may also exceed these limits if it owns stations broadcasting in both English and French; for instance, in the Montreal media market, Bell Media Radio owns six radio stations, of which two operate in French and four in English. Formerly, Corus Entertainment owned six radio stations in the Montreal media market as well, four of them operating in French (two AM radio stations and two FM radio stations), and two in English (one AM radio station and one FM radio station).

=== Television ===
Officially, CRTC policy mandates that a broadcaster may only own one television station in a particular language in any given market. However, there are two types of exemptions which may be granted:

1. small markets, in which one or more stations may be in financial jeopardy due to limited advertising revenue;
2. large markets, in which one or more stations may be in financial jeopardy due to audience fragmentation or the cost of programming rights.

The policy does not prevent companies from owning multiple stations in a market provided that the stations broadcast in different languages. In recent years, this has been interpreted as meaning that a single company may own both an English-language station and one or more multicultural stations with some English-language content, which in itself may be considered a form of "exemption". CBC/Radio-Canada owned-and-operated stations (O&Os) are also often deployed in pairs in major cities on both television and radio, separated only by language. In addition, the policy is not interpreted as preventing a single company from owning both a "commercial" general-interest station and an educational station in the same market, even if the latter airs advertising, as with Access in Alberta.

Although the small and large market exemptions have a financial criterion in common, there are notable differences between the two. A small market twinstick may involve major network affiliates licensed to the same community, and is not obligated to provide distinct local news programming on the two stations, while in a large market the stations must be licensed to serve different communities or different programming niches, and cannot merge their news programming into a single operation. Small market twinsticks commonly share their branding across both stations, while twinsticks in large markets generally do not. As well, while small market twinsticks generally involve private affiliates, major market twinsticks are virtually always owned-and-operated stations of their associated networks or systems.

In a few isolated cases, the CRTC has permitted "triple-sticks", or triopolies, where a single broadcaster operates three stations in a market. These are only possible under unusual circumstances which are discussed as they arise below.

==== History ====
Twinsticks were first allowed in 1967, as a way to help expand CTV service to smaller markets. In the original twinstick model, the second station was a rebroadcaster of a CTV station in a larger market, to which the small market's existing CBC affiliate would be granted the advertising sales rights.

As the company's advertising revenue grew, the CTV transmitter would eventually become an originating station in its own right, and in theory would eventually be sold to another broadcaster. However, in many cases the subsequent sale never happened, as the community's economic growth failed to lend itself to competition between multiple television broadcasters. In other markets where the CRTC had licensed competing broadcasters, such as Northern Ontario, twinstick mergers were subsequently allowed to permit the survival of both television stations after similar economic difficulties were encountered.

With the cross-national consolidation of media ownership, nearly all of the original twinstick stations no longer share ownership with their former twin stations. However, the second type of twinstick, involving media consolidation in larger markets, began to arise in the 1990s.

==== Small markets ====
Up until February 2010, twinsticks of this type outside of Quebec involved CTV and CBC Television affiliates. Currently the only small-market twinstick in English Canada consists of Global and CTV affiliates.

- Thunder Bay – CHFD and CKPR (Dougall Media)

Within Quebec, twinsticks consist of TVA and Noovo affiliates:

- Gatineau – CHOT and CFGS (RNC Media)

From 1997 to 2002, CTV directly owned several CBC twinstick stations that it had inherited from Baton Broadcasting (CKNC, CHNB, CJIC and CFCL in Northern Ontario, which were part of the MCTV system, and CKBI and CKOS in Saskatchewan); these were sold to the CBC in 2002. Similarly, until August 2008, Cogeco owned three twinsticks in Quebec: CKTV and CFRS in Saguenay, CKSH and CFKS in Sherbrooke and CKTM and CFKM in Trois-Rivières. These twinsticks were dissolved when Radio-Canada decided to acquire its former affiliates (CKTV, CKSH and CKTM), while the V affiliates (CFRS, CFKS and CFKM) were acquired by Remstar Corporation, the new owner of V (then known as TQS, now known as Novoo).

One "triple-stick" also existed in which a single company, Télé Inter-Rives, operated all three licensed stations in Rivière-du-Loup: CKRT, CIMT and CFTF. RNC Media also formerly had an effective "triple-stick" in the Abitibi-Témiscamingue region of Quebec, with ownership of CFEM-DT (TVA) and CKRN-DT (Radio-Canada) in the city of Rouyn-Noranda and CFVS-DT (Novoo) in Val-d'Or — although technically licensed to separate cities, in actual practice all three stations served both cities through rebroadcast transmitters. As of 2018, however, CKRN and CKRT are no longer in operation. These unusual situations arise because of the unique circumstances of francophone television stations in Quebec: with virtually no sources for syndicated programming, the stations are effectively constrained to network programming at virtually all times, meaning that despite being owned by a single company, the stations are still able to meet the guiding principles behind the CRTC's policies on media ownership.

As noted above, historically, twinstick operations were locally owned. With the cross-national consolidation of media ownership in Canada, however, most twinstick operations are now owned by major media conglomerates. The Thunder Bay Television stations (CHFD/CKPR) are the sole remaining locally owned twinstick anywhere in English Canada. The aforementioned Télé Inter-Rives is similarly unique in Quebec, although Quebecor holds a minority stake in the company.

==== Major markets ====
In the mid-1990s, the CRTC also began to allow private companies operating in large markets to acquire smaller stations. In all such cases, the twinsticks are permitted because a diversity of broadcast voices already exists in the market, and the stations are normally licensed to serve different communities in the metropolitan market or different programming niches. The stations must also be operated independently of each other, although they are permitted to cross-promote each other's programming. They may also air a very limited amount of common programming, although in practice this privilege is rarely used.

Currently, Bell Media operates twinsticks in three major markets, using the CTV and CTV Two brands:

- Ottawa – CJOH and CHRO
- Toronto-Barrie – CFTO and CKVR
- Vancouver-Victoria – CIVT and CIVI

In addition to these "true" twinsticks, in some areas, Bell Media has taken a twinstick-type approach with two stations deemed to be in adjacent media markets, but which in practice serve both markets. For example, Bell operates both CTV station CKCO-DT in Kitchener, Ontario and CTV Two station CFPL-DT in London, about 100 kilometres (62 mi) away. Both have been carried on the VHF band of basic cable throughout much of southwestern Ontario for several decades. Hence, presumably as a result of this duplicated coverage, their current owner has elected to continue airing distinct programming on both stations (on the other hand, Kitchener is also about 100 km from Toronto; nevertheless both CKCO and Toronto's CFTO operate as CTV stations).

Finally, in some markets, Bell Media operates both a local over-the-air CTV station, and a provincial or regional cable channel that broadcasts CTV Two programming. In Alberta, CTV stations CFCN in Calgary and CFRN in Edmonton co-exist with CTV Two Alberta, which is officially licensed as the provincial educational broadcaster and is therefore technically exempt from the CRTC's common ownership policy (prior to September 2011, CTV Two Alberta also operated over-the-air transmitters in Calgary and Edmonton). In the Maritime Provinces, Bell Media operates both the over-the-air CTV Atlantic group of stations and the cable-only CTV Two Atlantic, which have been jointly owned (under various parent companies) since the latter's launch in 1983.

==== Previous examples ====
Canwest operated the CIII/CHCH twinstick in Toronto-Hamilton and the CHAN/CHEK twinstick in Vancouver-Victoria until 2009, under the Global and E! brands. These two sets of twinsticks were separated as a result of E!'s demise in August 2009, with Canwest retaining the Global O&Os (CIII and CHAN) and selling off the E! stations (CHCH and CHEK). Additionally, Canwest previously owned the now-defunct CHCA in Red Deer, which was available on cable and via rebroadcast transmitters in both Calgary and Edmonton, where Canwest respectively already owned CICT and CITV. This was not considered a true twinstick as CHCA was not based in the larger markets, and did not have permission to solicit local advertising in those markets. It did, however, have simultaneous substitution rights.

CHUM Television operated the CITY/CKVR twinstick in Toronto-Barrie and the CKVU/CIVI twinstick in Vancouver-Victoria under the Citytv and A-Channel brands prior to its acquisition by CTVglobemedia in 2006. Following this acquisition, Rogers Media briefly held twinsticks in Vancouver (CKVU and CHNU) and Winnipeg (CHMI and CIIT), formed from its newly acquired Citytv stations and its Omni-branded religious stations; these two sets of twinsticks were dissolved in 2008 following the sales of CHNU and CIIT to S-VOX

Unlike the situation in smaller markets, this type of "consolidation" twinstick had been increasingly common up to the late 2000s, concurrently with the rise of secondary television systems (such as CH/E! and A-Channel) launched by their parent companies to complement their primary networks or systems (such as Global and Citytv). This trend was partially reversed in 2009 with the demise of E! and the subsequent dissolution of the Global/E! twinsticks.

In Lloydminster, Stingray Radio ran CITL and CKSA as a CTV/Citytv twinstick; the stations shut down in 2025.

==== Multiple languages ====
In many major markets, the Canadian Broadcasting Corporation operates both CBC Television (English) and Ici Radio-Canada Télé (French) stations, as listed below. Prior to the CBC decommissioning all of its television rebroadcasters in 2012, both networks were available over-the-air in numerous other markets not listed below, but one or both of the transmitters was a rebroadcaster of a station originating in a different city; these were not usually considered true twinsticks. Nevertheless, both networks continue to be available as part of the basic programming tier on all cable and satellite providers nationwide.

- Edmonton – CBXT and CBXFT
- Montreal – CBMT and CBFT
- Ottawa – CBOT and CBOFT
- Regina – CBKT and CBKFT
- Toronto – CBLT and CBLFT
- Vancouver – CBUT and CBUFT
- Windsor – CBET and CBEFT
- Winnipeg – CBWT and CBWFT

In Toronto, Edmonton and Calgary, Rogers Media's acquisition of the Citytv system put those stations in twinsticks with the multilingual Omni Television stations. In Toronto, Omni Television has its own twinstick, giving the company a nominal "triple-stick" in that market. The two Omni stations in Toronto each serve different segments of the market's multicultural audience, and thus are also permitted under the language exemption.

- Calgary – CKAL and CJCO
- Edmonton – CKEM and CJEO
- Toronto – CFMT, CJMT and CITY
- Vancouver – CKVU and CHNM

In Montreal, Canwest owned both Global station CKMI and multicultural station CJNT until August 2009, when the latter was sold to Channel Zero.

CTV was formerly a part-owner of the francophone V network (formerly TQS) in Quebec, meaning that V's owned-and-operated CFJP in Montreal was a partial twinstick with CTV's CFCF for most of the 2000s. CFCF was, in fact, the original owner of TQS, meaning that the stations were once a true twinstick under the language exemption, although the two stations went through very different sequences of ownership changes after 1995. Bell Media, the owner of CTV, reacquired V in 2020, reuniting CFJP to co-ownership with CFCF.

== Triopolies and quadropolies ==
NBCUniversal formerly owned three full-power stations in Los Angeles, NBC owned-and-operated station KNBC, Telemundo O&O KVEA and Spanish language independent station KWHY-TV, before selling KWHY to the Meruelo Group in January 2011. The FCC allows common ownership of three full-power television stations if there are 18 stations that are licensed within the market, Only a handful of TV markets have 18+ full-powered stations (namely, New York City, Los Angeles, the San Francisco Bay Area, and the North Texas Metroplex) exist where a station owner can legally have a true full-power triopoly, though Sinclair owns a legal de facto triopoly in Salt Lake City with CBS affiliate KUTV, independent station KJZZ-TV, and MyNetworkTV station KMYU.

The Federal Communications Commission otherwise only permits common ownership of three full-power television stations within one market if the tertiary station is licensed under a satellite station waiver (the FCC constitutes a full-power station that is licensed as a satellite as the same entity as its parent station, and therefore does not count them toward market ownership caps). A unique instance exists in Austin, Texas, involving the de facto triopoly of NBC affiliate KXAN-TV, CW affiliate KNVA and MyNetworkTV affiliate KBVO, the latter of which signed on in 1991 as a Llano-based satellite of KXAN to serve western portions of the market where reception of that station's UHF signal was impaired by the hilly terrain within the area. Even though KBVO was converted into a separately programmed station in October 2009 (and therefore no longer acts as a KXAN repeater, even by way of a subchannel), the FCC granted Media General permission to acquire its license under an existing satellite waiver during that company's merger with LIN Media in 2014 (without the waiver, Media General/LIN would have been forced to sell either KBVO or KNVA, which would not have been viable in any event, since there are not enough unique full-power station owners in the Austin market to permit a second legal duopoly with an owner of one of the market's three English language major network affiliates and neither would have likely had long-term financial survivability as a standalone station).

In addition, the FCC permits common ownership of three or more television stations if there are low-powered stations that are involved. For example, in the New York media market, a full-power duopoly was formed between WNET and WLIW once the two stations merged their operations with each other in 2003; this would be expanded into a physical quadropoly in early 2018 after WNET's owner acquired WNDT-CD and WMBQ-CD as a result of the FCC's 2017 spectrum incentive auction. As of 2020, WNET currently owns or operates six television stations in the New York region, two (WNJN and WNJB) of which are owned by Public Media NJ and operated by WNET through the NJTV state network, which replaced the New Jersey Network (NJN) as New Jersey's public television service in July 2011; the New Jersey Public Broadcasting Authority retained the licenses of all of the former NJN stations.

In the Salisbury, Maryland TV market (DMA #137) - Draper Holdings Business Trust has a triopoly of major broadcast networks: CBS (WBOC-TV, Full Power), FOX (WBOC-TV DT2, Full Power), and NBC (WRDE-LD). It also owns a Telemundo affiliate (WBOC-LD), along with COZI TV & Antenna TV on subchannels of WRDE-LD & WBOC-LD respectfully.

In 2013, through its acquisition of stations from Newport Television, Nexstar and Mission Broadcasting formed a full-power virtual quadropoly made up of two legal duopolies in Little Rock, Arkansas, consisting of NBC affiliate KARK-TV and MyNetworkTV affiliate KARZ-TV (which Nexstar already owned), and Fox affiliate KLRT-TV and CW affiliate KASN (another existing duopoly that was acquired by Mission). Through the resulting local marketing agreement with Nexstar, the operations of KLRT and KASN were consolidated into KARK/KARZ's facilities; 30 employees were laid off as part of the consolidation. A similar virtual quadropoly in the Mobile, Alabama-Pensacola, Florida market was formed through another acquisition from Newport, this time by Sinclair, consisting of Pensacola-based ABC affiliate WEAR-TV and MyNetworkTV affiliate WFGX (which were both already owned by Sinclair and licensed to the beach community of Fort Walton Beach), and Mobile-based NBC affiliate WPMI and Pensacola-licensed independent station WJTC (owned by Deerfield, and operated by Sinclair under a local marketing agreement). Unlike the quadropoly in Little Rock, Sinclair has not consolidated all four stations into one facility and each duopoly maintains their own studios in different parts of the market (WEAR/WFGX on the Florida side, WPMI/WJTC on the Alabama side). Similarly structured virtual triopolies (many of which are run by Nexstar and Sinclair) also exist in a few markets, in which either an existing owner-operator of a legal duopoly also manages a tertiary station owned by a separate if indirectly related licensee, or owns-operates one station and runs two others that are owned by different licensees.

In Canada, at least one community (Rivière-du-Loup, Quebec) has all three of its local French language stations – CKRT-DT, CIMT-DT and CFTF-DT – under common ownership, however such levels of common ownership are for the most part strongly discouraged by the CRTC unless the stations serve remote communities or separately carry programming in different languages (such as Rogers Media's aforementioned triopoly in Toronto, consisting of the English-language CITY-DT and multicultural stations CFMT-DT and CJMT-DT).

In Mexico, media concentration is endemic and it is not uncommon for as many as four stations to be operated by one entity. Televisa owns four Mexico City stations (XEW, XHTV, XHGC and XEQ) while Azteca, Mexico's second-largest broadcaster, owns three (XHIMT, XHDF and XHTVM). These stations, in turn, feed large numbers of full-power affiliates. The largest Mexican network is the Televisa-owned Canal de las Estrellas, which feeds its programming to more than 100 stations nationwide.

== See also ==
- Concentration of media ownership
- Trimulcast
