= 1986 in Canadian television =

This is a list of Canadian television related events from 1986.

== Events ==
Date	Event
May 2	7th Genie Awards.
May 2	The opening of Expo 86 in Vancouver airs on all the main television networks.
November 10	Juno Awards of 1986.
November 30	The Life Channel ceased broadcasting.
December 4	The 1st Gemini Awards airs on CBC Television.

=== Debuts ===
Show	Station	Premiere Date
The World Challenge (Le Défi mondial)	SRC (French); CBC (English)	January 3 (French); June 14 (English)
Dear Aunt Agnes	TVOntario	January 7
Airwaves	CBC Television	January 27
The Campbells	CTV	September 1
Adderly	Global	September 24
Camp Cariboo	CTV	Unknown
Night Walk	Global	Unknown

=== Ending this year ===
Show	Station	Cancelled
The Edison Twins	CBC Television	Unknown
Global Playhouse	Global	Unknown

== Television shows ==
=== 1950s ===
- Country Canada (1954–2007)
- Hockey Night in Canada (1952–present)
- The National (1954–present)
- Front Page Challenge (1957–1995)
- Wayne and Shuster Show (1958–1989)

=== 1960s ===
- CTV National News (1961–present)
- Land and Sea (1964–present)
- Man Alive (1967–2000)
- Mr. Dressup (1967–1996)
- The Nature of Things (1960–present, scientific documentary series)
- Question Period (1967–present, news program)
- The Tommy Hunter Show (1965–1992)
- W-FIVE (1966–present, newsmagazine program)

=== 1970s ===
- The Beachcombers (1972–1990)
- Canada AM (1972–present, news program)
- City Lights (1973–1989)
- Definition (1974–1989)
- the fifth estate (1975–present, newsmagazine program)
- Live It Up! (1978–1990)
- Marketplace (1972–present, newsmagazine program)
- Polka Dot Door (1971-1993)
- You Can't Do That on Television (1979–1990)
- 100 Huntley Street (1977–present, religious program)

=== 1980s ===
- Bumper Stumpers (1987–1990)
- Check it Out! (1985–1988)
- Danger Bay (1984–1990)
- Fraggle Rock (1983–1987)
- Guess What (1983–1987)
- Hangin' In (1981–1987)
- The Journal (1982–1992)
- Lorne Greene's New Wilderness (1982–1987)
- Midday (1985–2000)
- Night Heat (1985–1989)
- The Raccoons (1985–1992)
- Seeing Things (1981–1987)
- Switchback (1981–1990)
- Today's Special (1982–1987)
- Thrill of a Lifetime (1981–1987)
- Venture (1985–2007)
- Video Hits (1984–1993)

== TV movies ==
- The Marriage Bed
- Spearfield's Daughter
- Turning to Stone

== Networks and services ==
=== Network launches ===
Network	Type	Launch date	Notes
TQS	Over-the-air, cable and satellite	September 7	TQS (Télévision Quatre-Saisons, now V) is a French language television network distributed over-the-air via owned-and-operated stations and a few affiliates in the province of Quebec, and also serves neighboring portions of New Brunswick and Ontario
Ontario Parliament Network	Cable and satellite (also available over-the-air in certain Northern Ontario communities)	Unknown	The Ontario Parliament Network was launched to broadcast the parliamentary proceedings of the Legislative Assembly of Ontario

== Television stations ==
=== Debuts ===
Date	Market	Station	Channel	Affiliation	Notes/References
January 1	Pembina, North Dakota (United States)	KNRR	12	Independent	KNRR is a satellite of KVRR in Fargo, North Dakota. KNRR provides over-the-air coverage in southern Manitoba south of Winnipeg, on the same frequency as KCND-TV (1960–1975).
August 20	Montreal	CFTU-TV	29	French independent	
September 7	Gatineau, Quebec (Ottawa, Ontario)	CFGS-TV	34	TQS	
September 7	Montreal, Quebec	CFJP-TV	35	TQS	
September 7	Quebec City, Quebec	CFAP-TV	2	TQS	
September 7	Rimouski, Quebec	CJPC-TV	18	TQS	
September 7	Sherbrooke, Quebec	CFKS-TV	30	TQS	
September 7	Trois-Rivières	CFKM-TV	16	TQS	
December 1	Edmonton, Alberta	CJAL-TV	9	Independent	

=== Network affiliation changes ===
Date	Market	Station	Channel	Old affiliation	New affiliation	References
October 9	Pembina, North Dakota, US	KNRR	12	Independent	Fox	KNRR, part of a 4-station regional network anchored by KVRR/Fargo, North Dakota, that provides OTA coverage to southern Manitoba, becomes a charter affiliate of the Fox network.

== See also ==
- 1986 in Canada
- List of Canadian films of 1986
