= Media in Trois-Rivières =

This is a list of media in Trois-Rivières, Quebec.

== Radio ==
Frequency	Call sign	Branding	Format	Owner	Notes
89.1 FM	CFOU-FM		campus radio	Université du Québec à Trois-Rivières	French
89.9 FM	CIRA-FM-2	Radio Ville-Marie	Catholic radio	Radio Ville-Marie	French; rebroadcasts CIRA-FM Montreal.
93.9 FM	CBMZ-FM	CBC Radio One	public news/talk	Canadian Broadcasting Corporation	English; rebroadcasts CBVE-FM Quebec City.
94.7 FM	CHEY-FM	Rouge FM	adult contemporary	Bell Media Radio	French
96.5 FM	CBF-FM-8	Ici Radio-Canada Première	public news/talk	Canadian Broadcasting Corporation	French
100.1 FM	CJEB-FM	Rythme FM	adult contemporary	Cogeco	French
102.3 FM	CIGB-FM	Énergie	Mainstream Rock	Bell Media Radio	French
104.3 FM	CBFX-FM-1	Ici Musique	Public music	Canadian Broadcasting Corporation	French; rebroadcasts CBFX-FM Montreal.
106.9 FM	CKOB-FM	106,9	Talk radio/Sports/Rock	Cogeco	French

Internet radio stations

Frequency	Branding	Format	Owner	Notes
Internet only	Ici Musique atmosphère	Ambient music	Société Radio-Canada	Rebroadcasting from Montreal, Serving provincial wide. French
Internet only	Ici Musique Classique	Classical radio	Société Radio-Canada	Rebroadcasting from Montreal, Serving provincial wide. French
Internet only	Ici Musique Rock	Rock	Société Radio-Canada	Rebroadcasting from Montreal, Serving provincial wide. French
Internet only	Ici Musique Hip-Hop	Urban contemporary	Société Radio-Canada	Rebroadcasting from Montreal, Serving provincial wide. French
Internet only	Qub Radio	Talk radio	Quebecor Media	Rebroadcasting from Montreal, Serving provincial wide. French

== Television ==
Trois-Rivières is served by the Cogeco cable system, except the Cap-de-la-Madeleine area, which is serviced by Vidéotron.

Digital channel	Digital PSIP	Cable channel	Call sign	Network	Notes
8	8.1		CHEM-DT	TVA	French
28	13.1		CKTM-DT	Ici Radio-Canada	French
34	16.1		CFKM-DT	Noovo	French; rebroadcasts CFJP-DT Montreal
45	45.1		CIVC-DT	Télé-Québec	French; rebroadcasts CIVM-DT Montreal

== Print ==
- Le Nouvelliste
- L'Écho de Trois-Rivières
