= Jean Pouliot =

Canadian broadcasting pioneer (1923–2004)

Jean Pouliot OC
- Born: June 6, 1923; Quebec City, Quebec, Canada
- Died: August 8, 2004 (aged 81); Montreal, Quebec, Canada
- Occupation: Broadcaster
- Known for: Canadian broadcasting pioneer
- Father: Adrien Pouliot

Jean Adélard Pouliot OC (June 6, 1923 – August 8, 2004) was a Canadian broadcasting pioneer who helped establish television stations in Kitchener, Ontario, and Quebec City, Quebec. Pouliot was the president and CEO for the first publicly traded Quebec broadcasting company, Télé-Capitale, and started two French language networks: TVA (co-founded with Roland Giguère of Télé-Métropole in 1971), and TQS (Télévision Quatre-Saisons) (launched in 1986).

Pouliot founded CFCF Inc. in 1979 with his purchase of CFCF-TV, CFCF-AM, and CFQR-FM from the Bronfman family. CFCF Inc. went public in 1985, at which time it also included CF Cable TV, purchased by Pouliot in 1982. Pouliot was the Chairman and CEO of CFCF Inc. from 1979 to 1993, and remained Chairman until the company was sold to Vidéotron in 1997.

== Early career ==
Pouliot was born on June 6, 1923, in Quebec City to mathematician Adrien Pouliot and Laure Clark. Pouliot studied at Université Laval, graduating in 1945 with a degree in electrical engineering, specializing in electronics. He subsequently served as the superintendent of the Canadian Navy Laboratories until 1952. Prime Minister Louis St.-Laurent, impressed on hearing from his son that Pouliot had built Ottawa's only television receiver, recommended to the president of Famous Players Canadian Corporation that Pouliot be enlisted to aid the company in launching television stations in Canada. In 1952, Pouliot's broadcasting career began, as the executive engineer for Famous Players Canadian Corporation. With Famous Players, he studied the feasibility of operating cable TV systems across Canada, and, in 1954, he oversaw the design and launch of television stations CKCO-TV in Kitchener, Ontario, and CFCM-TV in Quebec City. CFCM-TV was Quebec's first private television station, owned by Télévision de Québec, a consortium including Famous Players and radio stations CHRC and CKCV. Pouliot was also President of the flying club Tapis rouge and Quebec Aviation from 1968 to 1976.

== First publicly traded Quebec broadcaster ==
In 1957, Pouliot became the general manager of Télévision de Québec, and launched CKMI-TV, Quebec's second private television station. CKMI-TV became Quebec City's CBC affiliate, and CFCM-TV converted to French language-only broadcasts. The new station was profitable in under a year. While at Télévision de Québec, Pouliot served from 1961 to 1965 as Vice-President, Television, of the Canadian Association of Broadcasters (CAB), and as its first francophone president from 1965 to 1967.

In 1971, Télévision de Québec expanded into radio, acquiring CHRC Limitée (CHRC-AM and CHOI-FM) and CKLM Montréal, as well as into movie production, with the purchase of Ciné-Capitale Ltée. In addition, together with Roland Giguère of Télé-Métropole, Pouliot co-founded the French language network TVA. The company, renamed Télé-Capitale, became the first publicly traded Quebec broadcaster in 1972, with Jean Pouliot at its head as president, CEO, and major shareholder. From 1971 to 1977, Pouliot was also the president of Broadcast News.

== CFCF Inc. ==
In 1978, Pouliot was forced out of Télé-Capitale, and in the following year, purchased Montreal radio stations CFCF-AM and CFQR-FM, television station CFCF-TV, and production company Champlain Productions from the Bronfman family, forming CFCF Inc. In 1982, CFCF Inc. purchased CF Cable TV, which served primarily the western half of the island of Montreal, from the McConnell family. CF Cable acquired other cable systems, such as the Northern Cable system in Northeastern Ontario,

After having tripled CFCF-TV's advertising sales and increased profitability by a factor of ten, in 1985, CFCF Inc. went public, and CFCF launched a new French language network, TQS (Télévision Quatre-Saisons), designed to be a "glitzy, high-tech 'metropolitan station'". TQS began broadcasting on September 7, 1986, from CFCF-TV's new Montreal sister station CFJP-TV ("JP" standing for "Jean Pouliot"). The TQS network would later add CFAP-TV in Quebec City, affiliates in Hull (now Gatineau), Jonquière (now Saguenay), Sherbrooke, Trois-Rivières, Rouyn-Noranda and Rivière-du-Loup, and a retransmitting station in Rimouski, reaching nearly 90% of the Quebec population.

Télévision Quatre-Saisons faced a great deal of growing pains, however, with a Canadian recession depressing advertising revenue, and a difficult task winning viewers from the existing French language networks. By 1990, TQS was the only non-profitable division of CFCF.

In 1993, Pouliot stepped down as CEO, handing over control to his son, Adrien Pouliot, who had been able to stabilize CFCF's financial situation. Jean remained chairman of the board, and continued to work mornings.

With the Global Television Network entering the Montreal market, thus shifting various U.S. television shows from CFCF's schedule to CKMI, and shareholder objections to CFCF's initial plan to sell CF Cable to Vidéotron in exchange for buying TVA, in 1997 the Pouliot family sold CFCF Inc. to Vidéotron.

Jean Pouliot died on August 8, 2004.

== Honours and legacy ==
Pouliot received the Communications Award in the category of Communications Entrepreneurship from the Quebec government in 1988. Pouliot became an Officer of the Order of Canada in 1990. In 1992, Pouliot was inducted into the Canadian Association of Broadcasters Hall of Fame, and in 1997, Concordia University granted him a Doctorate of Laws "Honoris Causa".

Pouliot supported a number of philanthropic causes, most notably the "Telethon of Stars", first broadcast in English and French on CFCF-TV in 1977, benefiting research into children's diseases. After the creation of TQS, the Telethon of Stars was simulcast on CFCF and the TQS network. Starting in 1994, although TQS continued to host the traditional telethon, CFCF shifted to a movie marathon interspersed with fundraising segments. TQS (then rebranded V) ceased airing the telethon after 2008, with CFCF airing one more edition in 2009.
