= Channel 7 virtual TV stations in Canada =

The following television stations operate on virtual channel 7 in Canada:

- CFTF-DT-7 in Sept-Îles, Quebec
- CHAU-DT-6 in Gaspé, Quebec
- CHBC-DT-2 in Vernon, British Columbia
- CHLT-DT in Sherbrooke, Quebec
- CIII-DT-7 in Midland, Ontario
- CISA-DT in Lethbridge, Alberta
- CJDG-DT in Val d'Or, Quebec
- CKRT-DT in Rivière-du-Loup, Quebec
- CKRT-DT-5 in Saint-Urbain, Quebec
- CKY-DT in Winnipeg, Manitoba
