= CKSH =

CKSH may refer to:

- CKSH-DT, a television station (channel 9) licensed to serve Sherbrooke, Quebec, Canada
- Cheng Kung Senior High School, a high school in Taipei, Taiwan
