= CF Cable TV =

Canadian cable company

- Industry: Telecommunications
- Founded: 1982
- Defunct: 1997
- Fate: Sold to Vidéotron in 1997
- Headquarters: Montreal, Quebec
- Key people: Jean Pouliot (owner)
- Products: Cable television

CF Cable TV was a Canadian cable company in the 1980s and 1990s. Owned by Jean Pouliot, a businessman in Montreal, Quebec whose holdings also included CFCF-TV and the TQS television network, CF Cable TV served parts of Montreal, Laval and western suburbs on the Island of Montreal.

== History ==
The company was established in 1982, when Pouliot acquired Cable TV Inc. from Starlaw Investments for a purchase price of $11.4 million.

The company expanded significantly in 1993, acquiring Télécâble Laurentien in the Outaouais region of Quebec and the Ottawa suburb of Clarence-Rockland in Ontario, and Northern Cable in Northern Ontario. The deals made CF Cable TV the fifth-largest cable operator in Canada. Both Laurentien and Northern continued to operate as separate divisions of the company rather than being folded into the CF Cable TV branding.

In 1997, Pouliot sold CF Cable TV's parent company, CFCF Inc., to Vidéotron. Videotron sold the Northern Cable division to Regional Cablesystems in 1998, but still retained ownership of the Montreal and Outaouais divisions.
