= Benoît Dutrizac =

Canadian journalist and commentator

Benoît Dutrizac (born September 2, 1961) is a Canadian journalist and commentator based in Quebec. He is best known as a television host in the 2000s, associated with the news-oriented talk shows Les Francs-Tireurs for Télé-Québec and Dutrizac for TQS.

He subsequently joined CHMP-FM, for whom he hosted a daily talk radio show. In this role he earned a reputation as a shock jock,.

Dutrizac left CHMP-FM in 2017. The following year he joined QUB, Quebecor's new web radio startup, as a morning host.
