= CIMT-DT =

Television station in Rivière-du-Loup

- Rivière-du-Loup, Quebec; Canada
- Channels: Digital: 9 (VHF); Virtual: 9
- Branding: CIMT/CHAU TVA (general); TVA Nouvelles soir CIMT (newscasts)

Programming
- Affiliations: 9.1: TVA

Ownership
- Owner: Télé Inter-Rives
- Sister stations: CFTF-DT, CHAU-DT

History
- First air date: September 17, 1978
- Former call signs: CIMT-TV (1978–2011)
- Former channel numbers: Analog: 9 (VHF, 1978–2011)
- Former affiliations: Réseau Pathonic (secondary, 1986–1990)

Technical information
- Licensing authority: CRTC
- ERP: 27.5 kW
- HAAT: 362.2 m (1,188 ft)
- Transmitter coordinates: 47°35′3″N 69°22′8″W
- Translator(s): see § Transmitters

Links
- Website: CIMT/CHAU TVA

CIMT-DT (channel 9) is a television station in Rivière-du-Loup, Quebec, Canada, affiliated with the French-language network TVA. Owned by Télé Inter-Rives, it is part of a twinstick with Noovo affiliate CFTF-DT (channel 29). The two stations share studios on Rue de la Chute and Rue Frontenac in Rivière-du-Loup; CIMT-DT's transmitter is located near Chemin du Mont Bleu in Picard.

== History ==
The station was launched on September 17, 1978. It is part of a rare "triple-stick", owned by Télé Inter-Rives, which also owns CKRT and CFTF.

Télé Inter-Rives also owns the TVA affiliate in Carleton-sur-Mer, CHAU-DT. The latter station picks up the TVA signal from CIMT, and the two stations' logos are shown in promos.

== Technical information ==
=== Subchannel ===
Subchannel of CIMT-DT
Subchannel	Res.	Short name	Programming
9.1	1080i	CIMT-DT	TVA

=== Transmitters ===
In addition to several smaller Quebec communities, CIMT also has a rebroadcast transmitter in Edmundston, New Brunswick. CIMT is carried on cable in most of northern New Brunswick as well as in parts of Northern Maine. Sister station CHAU also operates several rebroadcasters in New Brunswick, and its main signal covers portions of New Brunswick as well. Between them, the two stations provide TVA service to all of New Brunswick.

Since 1999, CIMT has operated a "nested" low-power rebroadcaster, CIMT-DT-6 (formerly CIMT-6), primarily serving western Rivière-du-Loup. The area's rugged topography renders the main CIMT signal more or less unviewable in the lower portions of the city. CIMT's main signal is on channel 9, while its second transmitter in Rivière-du-Loup airs on channel 13.

CIMT-DT converted all its transmitters to digital by the August 31, 2011, digital transition deadline, including its transmitters that were not required to convert by this deadline. Only its transmitters in Rivière-du-Loup was obligated to convert, as Rivière-du-Loup was a mandatory market for digital television conversion.

As part of the Spectrum auction in Canada in 2016, CIMT-DT applied to move repeater CIMT-DT-6 on UHF 41 down to UHF 35, in line with international coordination with the FCC as a result of their 600 MHz band spectrum auction removing channels 38-51 from television service. Ultimately, by November 24, 2021, CIMT-DT would instead be granted permission by the CRTC to move CIMT-DT-6 to the former CKRT-DT-3 facility, effectively restoring that transmitter to active use and decommissioning CIMT-DT-6. The reasons cited were greater reliability and lower power usage (and thus, less expensive to run), as CKRT-DT-3 was on VHF 13 when it was shut down, as opposed to the UHF band the repeater occupied.

Station	City of licence	Channel	ERP	HAAT	Transmitter coordinates
CIMT-DT-1	Edmundston, New Brunswick (Madawaska–Presque Isle, Maine, U.S.)	4 (VHF)	2.22 kW	117.2 m (385 ft)	47°23′23″N 68°18′58″W
CIMT-DT-2	Trois-Pistoles	13 (VHF)	0.050 kW	50.6 m (166 ft)	48°6′19″N 69°10′11″W
CIMT-DT-4	Baie-Saint-Paul	13 (VHF)	0.04 kW	−4.2 m (−14 ft)	47°25′37″N 70°31′23″W
CIMT-DT-5	Saint-Urbain	24 (UHF)	0.394 kW	27.8 m (91 ft)	47°33′7″N 70°33′38″W
CIMT-DT-6	Rivière-du-Loup (city)	13 (VHF)	0.114 kW	49 m (161 ft)	47°51′28″N 69°33′9″W
CIMT-DT-7	Les Escoumins	35 (UHF)	0.312 kW	87.9 m (288 ft)	48°19′0″N 69°25′41″W
CIMT-DT-8	Cabano	23 (UHF)	0.101 kW	125.5 m (412 ft)	47°37′31″N 68°50′52″W
