= Triopoly =

Triopoly can refer to:

- Triopoly (board game)
- An oligopoly with three sellers
- A twinstick or duopoly (broadcasting) operation to which a third local station under the same common ownership has been added. If programming (and not just ownership) is the same across three stations in the same market, the cluster is not a triopoly but a trimulcast.
