= CHAU-DT =

Television station in Carleton-sur-Mer

- Carleton-sur-Mer, Quebec; Canada
- Channels: Digital: 5 (VHF); Virtual: 5
- Branding: CIMT/CHAU TVA (general); TVA Nouvelles soir CHAU (newscasts)

Programming
- Affiliations: TVA

Ownership
- Owner: Télé Inter-Rives; (CHAU-TV Communications Ltée)
- Sister stations: CIMT-DT

History
- First air date: October 17, 1959
- Former call signs: CHAU-TV (1959–2011)
- Former channel numbers: Analog: 5 (VHF, 1959–2011)
- Former affiliations: Radio-Canada (1959–1983); CBC Television (secondary, 1959–1968); TVA (secondary c. 1980–1983)
- Call sign meaning: La Baie des Chaleurs

Technical information
- Licensing authority: CRTC
- ERP: 9.85 kW
- HAAT: 482.8 m (1,584 ft)
- Transmitter coordinates: 48°8′8″N 66°6′58″W
- Translator(s): see § Transmitters

Links
- Website: CIMT/CHAU TVA

CHAU-DT (channel 5) is a television station in Carleton-sur-Mer, Quebec, Canada, affiliated with the French-language network TVA. Owned by Télé Inter-Rives, the station maintains studios on Boulevard Perron/Route 132 in Carleton-sur-Mer, with transmitter near Rue de la Montagne.

== History ==
The original owner of CHAU was Dr. Charles Houde of La Télévision de la Baie des Chaleurs, who put the station on the air for the first time on October 17, 1959. Initially, like all other Quebec private TV stations, CHAU was a dual CBC/SRC affiliate airing both English and French shows. For CHAU, the ratio of English to French programs was 7:13. The station entered Radio-Canada's microwave network on March 24, 1960, and became an all-French station in 1968 when Montreal's CBMT opened a rebroadcaster in Carleton. In 1978, it became one of the last Canadian stations to air local programming in black and white, prior to switching to colour.

CHAU's former logo.

In 1979, the Canadian Radio-television and Telecommunications Commission (CRTC) gave CHAU a mandate to extend TVA service to northern New Brunswick and the Gaspésie–Îles-de-la-Madeleine region as part of an effort to improve French-language television service in those areas. Accordingly, around 1980, CHAU began carrying TVA programming in off-hours. It became an exclusive TVA affiliate on December 18, 1983, when Radio-Canada opened a rebroadcaster of CBGAT in the Carleton area.

In 2000, CHAU-TV was one of four television stations purchased from the Power Corporation of Canada by Corus Entertainment, and the only one located outside Ontario. It was soon resold.

CHAU picks up the TVA signal from its sister station in Rivière-du-Loup, CIMT-DT, with both stations' logos used in network promos.

CHAU-DT holds the distinction of owning the largest rebroadcaster network of any privately owned station in Quebec. Its rebroadcaster network blankets the Gaspé, and it also operates three rebroadcasters in New Brunswick. The station's main signal also covers most of northern New Brunswick—its city grade signal covers Campbellton, while its grade B signal reaches Bathurst. It also operates a bureau in Bathurst. CIMT also operates a rebroadcaster in Edmundston, and between them the two stations provide TVA service to the entire province.

CHAU-DT was approved by the CRTC for and had plans for converting its transmitters to digital by the August 31, 2011, digital transition deadline, though none of its transmitters are subject to this deadline; neither the Gaspésie region nor the Campbellton area are designated as a mandatory market for digital television conversion. CHAU-DT converted all of its transmitters to digital in November 2011.

On June 6, 2018, Télé Inter-Rives filed an application with the CRTC to add a transmitter in the Magdalen Islands, expanding its already-large coverage area. If approved, this transmitter would receive the call sign CHAU-DT-12, broadcasting on VHF channel 12 at 100 watts from a tower in Cap-aux-Meules. The station had also expressed its interest in offering news coverage for viewers on the islands and work with independent media producers for further local content that would air on CHAU-DT and its repeater network, including the proposed CHAU-DT-12. The new repeater would broadcast on a channel previously used by local Radio-Canada repeater CBIMT—it and CBMT repeater CBMYT (channel 7) closed down on July 31, 2012, when budget cuts forced the closure of the CBC and Radio-Canada's remaining analog transmitters. The closedown of the CBC/Radio-Canada repeater network had left the Magdalen Islands without any over-the-air television service, due to its location far from the mainland.

== Technical information ==
=== Subchannel ===
Subchannel of CHAU-DT
Subchannel	Res.	Short name	Programming
5.1	1080i	CHAU-DT	TVA

=== Transmitters ===
Station	City of licence	Channel	ERP	HAAT	Transmitter coordinates
CHAU-DT-1	Sainte-Marguerite-Marie	3 (VHF)	1.68 kW	199.6 m	48°18′40″N 67°5′3″W
CHAU-DT-2	Saint-Quentin, NB	31 (UHF)	0.226 kW	96.2 m	47°30′45″N 67°16′58″W
CHAU-DT-3	Port-Daniel	10 (VHF)	0.021 kW	152.0 m	48°8′25″N 64°59′2″W
CHAU-DT-4	Chandler	26 (UHF)	0.184 kW	22.3 m	48°21′22″N 64°41′5″W
CHAU-DT-5	Percé	11 (VHF)	10.375 kW	389.7 m	48°31′38″N 64°14′37″W
CHAU-DT-6	Gaspé	7 (VHF)	0.13 kW	75.6 m	48°50′15″N 64°29′32″W
CHAU-DT-7	Rivière-au-Renard	4 (VHF)	0.990 kW	228.0 m	48°59′52″N 64°25′52″W
CHAU-DT-8	Cloridorme	11 (VHF)	0.11 kW	30.4 m	49°11′27″N 64°53′31″W
CHAU-DT-9	L'Anse-à-Valleau	12 (VHF)	0.075 kW	54.1 m	49°4′24″N 64°32′16″W
CHAU-DT-10	Tracadie, NB	9 (VHF)	0.025 kW	48.9 m	47°30′14″N 64°55′14″W
CHAU-DT-11	Kedgwick, NB	27 (UHF)	0.093 kW	66.6 m	47°38′12″N 67°21′15″W

CHAU-DT-5 was approved by the CRTC on April 8, 2013, to relocate its broadcasting frequency from channel 13 to channel 11; the station's owners cited interference from CBC Television station CBCT-DT in Charlottetown, Prince Edward Island, which also broadcasts on channel 13, as the reason.
