= CKTM-DT =

Television station in Trois-Rivières

Trois-Rivières, Quebec; Canada
- Channels: Digital: 28 (UHF); Virtual: 13
- Branding: ICI Mauricie–Centre-du-Québec

Programming
- Affiliations: Ici Radio-Canada Télé

Ownership
- Owner: Société Radio-Canada

History
- First air date: April 15, 1958
- Former call signs: CFTM-TV (unused, never used on air); CKTM-TV (1958–2011)
- Former channel numbers: Analogue: 13 (VHF, 1958–2011)
- Call sign meaning: Télévision Mauricie

Technical information
- Licensing authority: CRTC
- ERP: 38.9 kW
- HAAT: 314.6 m (1,032 ft)
- Transmitter coordinates: 46°29′33″N 72°39′7″W

Links
- Website: ICI Mauricie–Centre-du-Québec

CKTM-DT (channel 13), branded on-air as ICI Mauricie–Centre-du-Québec, is an Ici Radio-Canada Télé in Trois-Rivières, Quebec, Canada, serving the Mauricie region. The station is owned by the Canadian Broadcasting Corporation (known in French as Société Radio-Canada). CKTM-DT's studios are located on Boulevard Saint-Jean (near Route 40) in Trois-Rivières, and its transmitter is located on Rue Principale in Notre-Dame-du-Mont-Carmel.

== History ==
The station first signed on April 15, 1958; the station was the very first broadcasting property owned by what would become Cogeco, which was founded in Trois-Rivières the previous year.

Until June 2008, the station was owned by Cogeco and was a twinstick with the TQS O&O CFKM-TV. As a privately owned station, CKTM effectively functioned as a semi-satellite of CBFT in Montreal due to a lack of non-network sources of programming. The station had been owned directly by Cogeco prior to the latter's majority acquisition of TQS, to which Cogeco contributed its existing local stations. Radio-Canada took editorial control of the station's news programming in 2002, although it continued to share a studio with CFKM.

In September 2007, Radio-Canada announced that it would not renew its affiliation agreement with its three Cogeco-owned affiliates—CKTM, CKTV-TV in Saguenay and CKSH-TV in Sherbrooke—after their then-current agreement expired in August 2008. An application to directly acquire the stations was filed by Radio-Canada on April 25, 2008, concurrently with Cogeco's proposed sale of TQS to Remstar Corporation. The transaction was approved by the CRTC on June 26, 2008.

Radio-Canada relocated all its radio and television facilities in the region into an integrated production centre, which opened on March 22, 2010, in Trois-Rivières. Radio-Canada intends on increasing its local programming output on its radio and television stations in the region.
