= CJBR-DT =

Television station in Rimouski

- Rimouski, Quebec; Canada
- Channels: Digital: 27 (UHF); Virtual: 2
- Branding: ICI Bas-Saint-Laurent

Programming
- Affiliations: Ici Radio-Canada Télé

Ownership
- Owner: Société Radio-Canada
- Sister stations: CBRX-FM, CJBR-FM

History
- First air date: November 21, 1954
- Former call signs: CJBR-TV (1954–2011)
- Former channel numbers: Analog: 3 (VHF, 1954–1984), 2 (VHF, 1984–2011); Digital: 45 (UHF)
- Call sign meaning: Canada Jules Brillant Rimouski

Technical information
- Licensing authority: CRTC
- ERP: 117 kW
- HAAT: 284 m (932 ft)
- Transmitter coordinates: 48°19′40.6″N 68°50′8″W

Links
- Website: ICI Bas-Saint-Laurent

CJBR-DT (channel 2), branded as ICI Bas-Saint-Laurent, is an Ici Radio-Canada Télé station in Rimouski, Quebec, Canada. The station is owned by the Canadian Broadcasting Corporation (known in French as Société Radio-Canada). CJBR-DT's studios are located on Boulevard René-Lepage Est (near Rue Julien-Réhel) on Quebec Route 132 in Rimouski, and its transmitter is located on Chemin du Pic Champlain (near the shoreline of the Saint Lawrence River) in Saint-Fabien.

CJBR-DT is the main station for three regions in eastern Quebec: Bas-Saint-Laurent, Gaspésie–Îles-de-la-Madeleine and the Côte-Nord. It previously operated full-power satellites in Matane (CBGAT, channel 6) and Sept-Îles (CBST, channel 13), and rebroadcasters in other communities.

== History ==
=== CJBR ===
CJBR was launched on November 21, 1954, as a privately owned Radio-Canada affiliate owned by Lower St. Lawrence Radio Inc. and associated with Central Public Service Corp. Ltd., both companies owned by the family of Jules Brillant, who also owned CJBR radio. The station would later be linked to Radio-Canada's microwave network, on August 7, 1957, and would add a repeater in Edmundston, New Brunswick, CJBR-TV-1 (later CBAFT-2) on April 1, 1962.

The Brillants would sell CJBR-AM-TV to Telemedia in 1970, who, in turn, would sell the stations to Radio-Canada on August 1, 1977.

CJBR switched from channel 3 to channel 2 on March 12, 1984, but the Maritimes Edition of TV Guide still had it listed as channel 3 until the Maritimes Edition folded in 2005. CJBR, however, was seen on Cogeco cable channel 3 in the Rimouski area.

=== CBGAT ===
CBGAT was founded by Radiodiffusion de Matane (Matane Broadcasting) as CKBL-TV on August 19, 1958. In the beginning, the station was a semi-satellite to CJBR, and broadcast on channel 9. CKBL was linked to Radio-Canada's microwave network on November 15, 1958.

By 1961, the station moved its transmitter to a new location, which took the signal off the air for around a month. From 1962 to 1976, Hydro-Québec broadcast CKBL/CBGAT's signal on its own repeaters. Radio-Canada purchased the station on November 10, 1971, and the station received its current callsign sometime in 1972. Radio-Canada moved CBGAT's signal from channel 9 to channel 6 on November 29, 1978.

=== CBST ===
Radio-Canada launched CBST as a retransmitter of CBGAT on October 23, 1973, broadcasting on channel 13. CBST gained its own newscast on November 1, 1982.

=== CBVT semi-satellites ===
On December 5, 1990, the CBC enacted substantial budget cuts across the organization. As part of the cutbacks, the CBC ended the local operations of CJBR-TV, CBGAT, and CBST. All three stations became full-time satellites of CBVT in Quebec City.

However, local news would return in a different form five years later. Starting in September 1995, a new regional newscast, entitled Québec Ce Soir Est, was launched, which is now entitled Le Téléjournal/Est du Québec. This newscast was, however, produced in Quebec City at the studios of CBVT.

=== Return as separate stations ===
In 2009, Radio-Canada applied to the CRTC for permission to convert CJBR back into a full-fledged station, with CBGAT and CBST as its satellites. CJBR would once again provide distinct local news programming from CBVT. The application was approved by the CRTC on March 19, 2010.

On September 1, 2011, CJBR switched to digital broadcasting, broadcasting on digital channel 45 with a virtual channel of 2.1. However, Radio-Canada was not obligated to convert or close down this station, as Rimouski was not a mandatory market for digital conversion.

== Local programming ==
Le Téléjournal/Est du Québec, a separate weeknight newscast at 6 p.m., focuses on news in Eastern Quebec. While anchored from Quebec City, it uses Radio-Canada's bureaus across Eastern Quebec, with journalists in Rimouski, Sept-Îles, Baie-Comeau, Gaspé, Matane and Carleton-sur-Mer. Until its closedown in August 2021, CKRT-DT in Rivière-du-Loup, which has long rebroadcast CJBR-TV's newscasts, also carried the program.

== Technical information ==
=== Subchannel ===
Subchannel of CJBR-DT
Subchannel	Res.	Short name	Programming
2.1	720p	CJBR	Ici Radio-Canada Télé

=== Transmitters ===
In addition to CBST and CBGAT, CJBR had approximately 45 analog television rebroadcasters in on the Gaspé Peninsula and the Côte-Nord regions of Quebec.

Due to federal funding reductions to the CBC, in April 2012, the CBC responded with substantial budget cuts, which included shutting down CBC's and Radio-Canada's remaining analog transmitters—including CBST and CBGAT—on July 31, 2012. None of CBC or Radio-Canada's television rebroadcasters were converted to digital.
