= Télé Inter-Rives =

Canadian television broadcasting company

Télé Inter-Rives Limited ("Inter-Riverbank Television", literal translation) is a broadcasting company based in Rivière-du-Loup, Quebec. The Simard family holds a 55% stake in Télé Inter-Rives, with Quebecor (owner of Groupe TVA and the TVA network) holding the remaining 45%.

The company operates both commercial stations in Rivière-du-Loup in a "twin-stick" duopoly, by "cascade ownership":

- CIMT 9/6 (TVA)
- CFTF 29/11 (Noovo) (licensee: Télévision MBS Inc., owned by CKRT-TV Ltée.)

Prior to August 2021, Télé Inter-Rives also operated Ici Radio-Canada Télé affiliate CKRT 7/5/13 (licensee: CKRT-TV Ltée., owned by Télé Inter-Rives), creating a "triple-stick" triopoly in Rivière-du-Loup; that station closed down in August 2021, after Radio-Canada refused to renew its affiliation with CKRT-DT, with sources for alternate programming limited.

Télé Inter-Rives also operates Carleton-sur-Mer TVA affiliate CHAU-DT (licensee: CHAU-TV Communications Ltée., owned by Télé Inter-Rives).

The company was formed in 1981 as a holding company for CKRT, which has been owned by the Simard family since its launch in 1962.

Including the defunct CKRT-DT, the four stations air programming in French, as the language and population in Eastern Quebec is predominantly French Canadian.
