= CKSH-DT =

Television station in Sherbrooke

- Sherbrooke, Quebec; Canada
- Channels: Digital: 13 (VHF); Virtual: 9
- Branding: ICI Estrie

Programming
- Affiliations: Ici Radio-Canada Télé

Ownership
- Owner: Société Radio-Canada

History
- First air date: September 19, 1974
- Former call signs: CKSH-TV (1974–2011)
- Former channel numbers: Analogue: 9 (VHF, 1974–2011)
- Call sign meaning: Sherbrooke

Technical information
- Licensing authority: CRTC
- ERP: 1.5 kW
- HAAT: 585.9 m (1,922 ft)
- Transmitter coordinates: 45°18′43″N 72°14′30″W

Links
- Website: ICI Estrie

CKSH-DT (channel 9), branded ICI Estrie, is an Ici Radio-Canada Télé station in Sherbrooke, Quebec, Canada, serving the Estrie region. The station is owned by the Canadian Broadcasting Corporation (known in French as Société Radio-Canada). CKSH-DT's studios are located on Rue King Ouest in Sherbrooke, and its transmitter is located in Orford.

== History ==
The station first signed on the air on September 19, 1974. As a privately owned station, CKSH basically functioned as a semi-satellite of CBFT (channel 2) in Montreal due to not having alternative non-network sources of programming available. After several years, CKSH began airing its own local news and a few programs not carried by CBFT. The station had been owned directly by Cogeco prior to the latter's majority acquisition of the TQS network (later V, now Noovo), to which Cogeco contributed its existing local stations. Radio-Canada took editorial control of the station's news programming in 2002, although it currently shares a studio with its former sister station CFKS-DT (channel 30).

CKSH and TVA owned-and-operated station CHLT-DT (channel 7) in Sherbrooke are seen on some cable systems in Northern New England, serving the French American community. They serve as a vital link to the Québécois culture in these communities. Some parts of Vermont and New Hampshire can also pick up their signals over the air.

In September 2007, Radio-Canada announced that it would not renew its affiliation agreement with its three Cogeco-owned affiliates—CKSH, CKTM-TV in Trois-Rivières and CKTV-TV in Saguenay—after their then-current agreement expired in August 2008. An application to directly acquire the station was filed by Radio-Canada on April 25, 2008, concurrently with Cogeco's proposed sale of TQS to Remstar Corporation. The transaction was approved by the CRTC on June 26, 2008.

== Digital television and high definition ==
After the analogue television shutdown and digital conversion, which took place on August 31, 2011, CKSH has shut down its analogue transmitter at midnight on September 1, 2011, and started digital broadcasts on its former analogue channel number, 9. However, digital television receivers display CKSH's virtual channel as 9.1.
