= CJPC-DT =

Television station in Rimouski, Quebec, Canada

Semi-satellite of CFTF-DT, Rivière-du-Loup
- Rimouski, Quebec; Canada
- Channels: Digital: 27 (UHF); Virtual: 18
- Branding: Noovo CFTF

Programming
- Affiliations: Noovo

Ownership
- Owner: Télé Inter-Rives; (Télévision MBS, Inc.)
- Sister stations: CFTF-DT

History
- First air date: 1987
- Former call signs: CJPC-TV (1987–2011)
- Former channel numbers: Analog: 18 (UHF, 1987–2011)
- Call sign meaning: Jean Pouliot (network founder)

Technical information
- Licensing authority: CRTC
- ERP: 0.36 kW
- HAAT: 128 m (420 ft)
- Transmitter coordinates: 48°25′37″N 68°29′17″W

Links
- Website: Noovo CFTF

CJPC-DT (channel 18) is a television station in Rimouski, Quebec, Canada, affiliated with the French-language network Noovo. It is a semi-satellite of Rivière-du-Loup–based CFTF-DT which is owned by Télé Inter-Rives. CJPC-DT's studios are located on Rue Saint Germain and Avenue de la Cathédrale (near the shoreline of the Saint Lawrence River) in Rimouski, and its transmitter is located on Avenue de la Cathédrale (near Highway 20).

The station was launched in 1987, originally relaying the signal from CFJP-TV in Montreal. On June 1, 2007, the CRTC approved a joint application by TQS and Télé Inter-Rives to convert the TQS station in Rimouski, CJPC-TV, from a transmitter of CFJP Montreal to a transmitter of CFTF-TV in Rivière-du-Loup. As part of the deal, a news bureau would be built in Rimouski, and a limited amount of local programming would be added on CJPC.

== Subchannel ==
Subchannel of CJPC-DT
Subchannel	Res.	Short name	Programming
18.1	1080i	CJPC-DT	Noovo
