= CHOT-DT =

Television station in Gatineau

- Gatineau, Quebec; Ottawa, Ontario; Canada
- City: Gatineau, Quebec
- Channels: Digital: 32 (UHF); Virtual: 40
- Branding: TVA Gatineau–Ottawa (general); TVA Nouvelles (newscasts)

Programming
- Affiliations: 40.1: TVA

Ownership
- Owner: RNC MEDIA Inc.
- Sister stations: TV: CFGS-DT; Radio: CHLX-FM

History
- First air date: October 27, 1978
- Former call signs: CHOT-TV (1978–2011)
- Former channel numbers: Analog: 40 (UHF, 1978–2011); Digital: 40 (UHF, 2011–2020)
- Call sign meaning: C'est Hull–Ottawa Télévision

Technical information
- Licensing authority: CRTC
- ERP: 111.4 kW
- HAAT: 358 m (1,175 ft)
- Transmitter coordinates: 45°30′9″N 75°50′59″W

Links
- Website: TVA Gatineau–Ottawa

CHOT-DT (channel 40), branded TVA Gatineau–Ottawa, is a television station in Gatineau, Quebec, Canada, serving the National Capital Region as an affiliate of the French-language network TVA. It is owned by RNC Media alongside Noovo affiliate CFGS-DT (channel 34). The two stations share studios on Rue Jean-Proulx and Rue Buteau in the former city of Hull; CHOT-DT's transmitter is located at Camp Fortune in Chelsea, Quebec.

CHOT-DT is the largest TVA station that is not owned and operated by the network. It is also the largest network affiliate in Canada that is not owned by its associated network.

== History ==
From 1974 to 1977, the Ottawa–Hull area received TVA programming from CFVO-TV (channel 30), which was the first French-language commercial station in the National Capital Region. CFVO was cooperatively owned and constantly struggled financially. After its March 1977 closure, Radio-Québec bought the channel 30 physical plant directly from CFVO's creditors. The Canadian Radio-television and Telecommunications Commission (CRTC) then invited bids for a new French-language commercial station to be affiliated with TVA and operate on channel 40. Though as many as four bids were rumoured to be incoming for the TVA affiliate, the CRTC only received two, from Télé-Métropole (owner of TVA flagship station CFTM in Montreal) and Radio-Nord. The CRTC selected the application from Radio-Nord in December; CHOT, known as "Télé-Outaouais", began operations on October 27, 1978. Pierre Thibault, who had been a temporary manager for CFVO late in the station's life, served as its first general manager.

For a time until the late 1990s, CHOT was branded as "CHOT 40", referring to the station's channel number over the air. CHOT was one of the last television stations in Canada to use its over-the-air channel number in station branding. It is currently branded as "TVA Gatineau–Ottawa".

== Cable distribution ==
The station is carried on channel 4 by Vidéotron in Gatineau and on channel 10 by Rogers Cable in Ottawa.

CHOT is also carried by most of EastLink's cable systems in Northeastern Ontario, one of the only regions in English Canada that carries an affiliate station instead of the national feed of CFTM-DT. It has been available on cable in this region since the early 1980s, long before TVA carriage was mandated nationwide. Predecessor companies Northern Cable and Persona picked up CHOT due to the area's large Franco-Ontarian population, and continued to carry CHOT rather than switching providers.

== News operation ==
Former logo, used from the early 2000s until November 2012

TVA Nouvelles broadcasts a 30-minute local newscast every weekday at 6 p.m. and, as of 2019, a 17-minute local newscast at 12:13 p.m. In the past, CHOT had local news on weekends and a 15-minute noon newscast on weekdays, but recent cuts made by RNC Media had these newscasts replaced with Montreal-based TVA network news programs.

== Technical information ==
=== Subchannels ===
Subchannel of CHOT-DT
Subchannel	Res.	Short name	Programming
32.1	1080i	CHOT HD	TVA

=== Analog-to-digital conversion ===
After the analog television shutdown and digital conversion, which took place on August 31, 2011, CHOT-TV flash cut to digital maintaining operations on UHF channel 40. As part of the UHF spectrum repack, CHOT-DT was required to move broadcast frequencies by July 2020. CHOT-DT moved to UHF channel 32 in July 2020; CHOT-DT was to display as virtual channel 40, but displays as 32.
