= CKRT-DT =

Defunct Ici Radio-Canada Télé affiliate in Rivière-du-Loup, Quebec

- Rivière-du-Loup, Quebec; Canada
- Channels: Digital: 7 (VHF); Virtual: 7
- Branding: Ici CKRT

Programming
- Affiliations: Ici Radio-Canada Télé

Ownership
- Owner: Télé Inter-Rives; (CKRT-TV Ltée)
- Sister stations: CFTF-DT, CIMT-DT

History
- First air date: January 14, 1962
- Last air date: August 31, 2021
- Former channel numbers: Analogue: 7 (VHF, 1962–2011)

Technical information
- Licensing authority: CRTC
- ERP: 7 kW
- HAAT: 345.1 m (1,132 ft)
- Transmitter coordinates: 47°35′3″N 69°22′8″W
- Translator(s): see § Transmitters

CKRT-DT (channel 7) was a television station in Rivière-du-Loup, Quebec, Canada, which served as a private affiliate of Ici Radio-Canada Télé. Owned by the Simard family and their company, Télé Inter-Rives, it was sister to Noovo affiliate CFTF-DT and TVA affiliate CIMT-DT. This arrangement made the station part of a so-called "triple-stick"—three stations owned by a single company. The three stations shared studios on Rue de la Chute and Rue Frontenac in Rivière-du-Loup; CKRT-DT's transmitter was located near Chemin du Mont Bleu in Picard.

CKRT went off the air for the last time on August 31, 2021; it was the last remaining privately owned Radio-Canada affiliate.

== Overview ==
The station first aired on January 14, 1962, and had been owned by the Simard family for its entire existence. Station founder Luc Simard had gotten word that CJBR-TV in Rimouski wanted to set up a rebroadcaster in Rivière-du-Loup, but felt the city was big enough for a station in its own right. It operated mostly as a repeater of CFCM-TV in Quebec City for its first two weeks on the air. Its original studio, near the transmitter in Picard, opened on February 9. The station went dark due to a fire in 1963, but was only off the air for nine days.

Not long after bringing the station on-air, the Simards discovered that the lower, western portions of the city experienced frequent signal dropout. Realizing that there was no way to serve all of the city from a single transmitter, CKRT applied for and received permission to sign on a "nested" rebroadcaster in Rivière-du-Loup, CKRT-TV-3, on channel 13. The repeater signed on in 1964 and mainly served the western portion of the city. All other stations in the region eventually followed CKRT's lead. Earlier that year, it moved to its current studio in Rivière-du-Loup.

CKRT did not have access to alternative non-network program sources (as privately owned English language CBC affiliates did when they existed). For this reason, it operated mostly as a semi-satellite of CBFT in Montreal. It also carried Radio-Canada's regional news program for eastern Quebec, Le Téléjournal/Est-du-Québec, from CJBR in Rimouski.

CKRT-TV converted its entire transmitter network to digital by the August 31, 2011 digital transition deadline, including its transmitters that were not required to convert by this deadline. Only its main transmitter and its "nested" rebroadcaster in Rivière-du-Loup were obligated to convert, as Rivière-du-Loup is a mandatory market for digital television conversion.

Following the closure of affiliate CKRN-DT in Rouyn-Noranda on March 25, 2018, CKRT-DT became the only privately owned Radio-Canada affiliate remaining in the network, as well as the only privately owned station that still carried programming from either Radio-Canada or the CBC.

In April 2021, Télé Inter-Rives informed the CRTC that the CBC had decided not to renew CKRT's Ici Radio-Canada Télé affiliation after August 31, 2021, with no possibility of a reversal. As Inter-Rives already operated separate TVA and Noovo affiliates in the market, the station had no other source of alternate programming available, forcing CKRT to go off the air on August 31. Inter-Rives has requested that it be permitted to re-allocate CKRT's funding under the Independent Local News Fund to sister station CFTF. According to CBC spokesman Marc Pichette, the CBC had opted to sever its remaining affiliation agreements because it believed "over-the-air television is no longer considered an adequate and efficient means to offer our content to Canadians" aside from its owned-and-operated stations. Cable systems in CKRT's former service area had since replaced it with CJBR; few viewers lost access to Ici Radio-Canada Télé programming, as over 99 percent of the region is served by cable.

== Transmitters ==
Station	City of licence	Channel	ERP	HAAT	Transmitter Coordinates
CKRT-DT-1	Baie-Saint-Paul	36 (UHF) (had planned to move to 35 (UHF))		-28.1 m	47°25′26″N 70°31′29″W
CKRT-DT-2	Dégelis	25 (UHF)		133.1 m	47°34′37″N 68°36′28″W
CKRT-DT-3	Rivière-du-Loup (city)	13 (VHF)		49.2 m	47°51′28″N 69°33′11″W
CKRT-DT-4	Cabano	21 (UHF)		91.2 m	47°37′31″N 68°50′52″W
CKRT-DT-5	Saint-Urbain	35 (UHF)		23.9 m	47°33′7″N 70°33′38″W
CKRT-DT-6	Trois-Pistoles	19 (UHF)		NA	48°6′19″N 69°10′11″W

CKRT-DT was also previously repeated on CBC-owned rebroadcasters in Clermont, Notre-Dame-des-Monts and Saint-Pamphile. Due to budget cuts, the CBC closed all of its corporate-owned transmitters, including those rebroadcasting private affiliates, on July 31, 2012.
