= L'Anse-à-Valleau, Quebec =

L'Anse-à-Valleau
- Unincorporated community
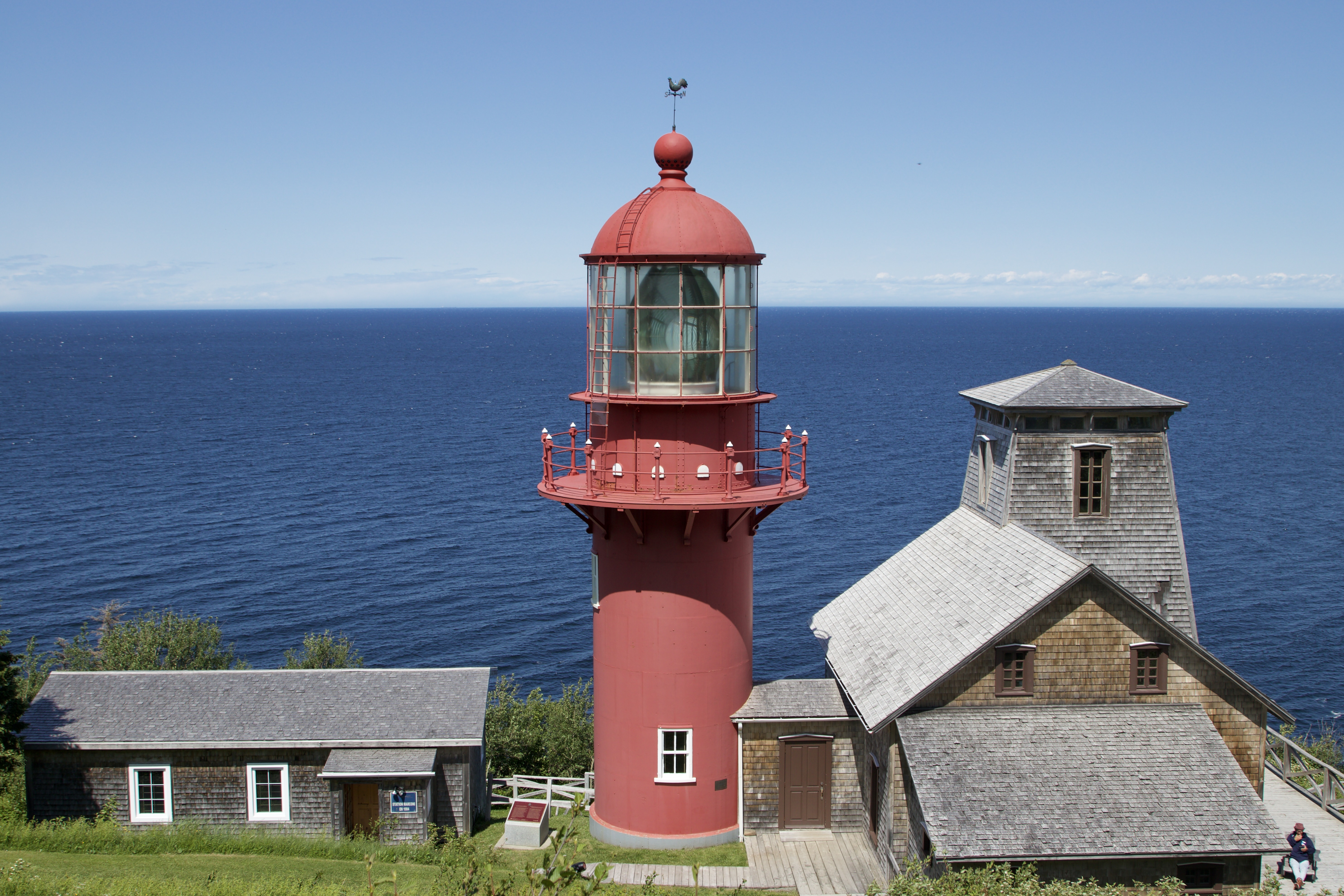
- Pointe-à-la-Renommée Lighthouse, near the village of L'Anse-à-Valleau

- Location within Quebec
- Coordinates: 48°11′N 64°58′W
- Country: Canada
- Province: Quebec
- Region: Gaspésie-Îles-de-la-Madeleine
- RCM: La Côte-de-Gaspé
- Municipality: Gaspé

Population
  - Total: 15,102
- Time zone: UTC-5 (EST)
  - Summer (DST): UTC-4 (EDT)
- Area code: 418

L'Anse-à-Valleau is a town in the municipality of Gaspé in the province of Quebec, Canada. It is located between the coastal towns of Saint-Yvon, 22 km NW, and Pointe-Jaune, 2 km SE.
