= CFTF-DT =

Television station in Quebec, Canada

- Rivière-du-Loup, Quebec; Canada
- Channels: Digital: 7 (VHF); Virtual: 29
- Branding: Noovo CFTF

Programming
- Affiliations: 29.1: Noovo

Ownership
- Owner: Télé Inter-Rives; (Télévision MBS inc.)
- Sister stations: CIMT-DT

History
- First air date: June 28, 1988
- Former call signs: CFTF-TV (1988–2011)
- Former channel numbers: Analog: 29 (UHF, 1988–2011); Digital: 29 (UHF, 2011–2024)

Technical information
- Licensing authority: CRTC
- ERP: 7 kW
- HAAT: 345.1 m (1,132 ft)
- Transmitter coordinates: 47°34′37″N 69°22′58″W
- Translator(s): see § Transmitters

Links
- Website: Noovo CFTF

CFTF-DT (channel 29) is a television station in Rivière-du-Loup, Quebec, Canada, affiliated with the French-language network Noovo. Owned by Télé Inter-Rives, it is a twinstick to TVA affiliate CIMT-DT. The two stations share studios on Rue de la Chute and Rue Frontenac in Rivière-du-Loup; CFTF-DT's transmitter is located near Chemin du Mont Bleu in Picard.

Like its two sister stations, it operates a second, "nested" low-power transmitter in Rivière-du-Loup. The area's rugged terrain makes the main signal practically unviewable in the lower portions of the city. The rebroadcaster, CFTF-6 (now CFTF-DT-6), signed on in 1999. The reception problem is exacerbated by the station's location on the UHF band (UHF stations have never gotten good reception in rugged terrain), as well as its relatively modest operating power. Its analog signal only operated at 50,000 watts, and its digital signal operates at only 44,000 watts—roughly equivalent to 220,000 watts in analog. The main signal is located on channel 29, while the rebroadcaster is on channel 11. It also operates a rebroadcaster in Edmundston, New Brunswick—the only Noovo rebroadcaster located outside of Quebec.

The station airs a 15-minute regional newscast at 5:30 p.m. on weekdays from its Rivière-du-Loup studio, with additional reporting from a bureau in Carleton-sur-Mer at co-owned CHAU-DT.

On June 1, 2007, the Canadian Radio-television and Telecommunications Commission (CRTC) approved a joint application by TQS (predecessor to Noovo) and Télé Inter-Rives to convert the TQS station in Rimouski, CJPC-TV, from a rebroadcaster of CFJP Montreal to a semi-satellite of CFTF. As part of the deal, a news bureau would be built in Rimouski, and a limited amount of local programming would be added on CJPC.

On November 24, 2021, Télé Inter-Rives was granted approval to change the frequency of their CFTF-DT from UHF 29 to VHF 7, with a decrease in power from 26.2 kW (maximum 44 kW) to 7 kW (constant), increasing the height from 341.1 to 345.1 meters, and to move to the former location of defunct sister station CKRT-DT, effectively shutting down the current transmitter and reactivating CKRT-DT. The reasons cited were greater reliability, less power needed (and thus cheaper to operate) on the VHF band, and it would nearly double the station's reception area. In addition, repeater CFTF-DT-11 on UHF 44 would change its application to move to UHF 26 to instead occupy UHF 29, as that would no longer be occupied by its parent station. Accompanying the change in frequency would be a slight reduction in power (dropping from 10,350 to 10,281 watts, with its maximum effective radiated power dropping from 26 kW to 19.5 kW).

== Technical information ==
=== Subchannel ===
Subchannel of CFTF-DT
Subchannel	Res.	Short name	Programming
7.1	1080i	CFTF-DT	Noovo

=== Transmitters ===
Station	City of licence	Channel	ERP	HAAT	Transmitter coordinates
CFTF-DT-1	Edmundston, New Brunswick (Madawaska/Presque Isle, Maine, USA)	18 (UHF)	0.054 kW	145 m	47°23′16″N 68°19′1″W
CFTF-DT-2	Trois-Pistoles	17 (UHF)	0.355 kW	47.3 m	48°6′19″N 69°10′11″W
CFTF-DT-3	Cabano	12 (VHF)	0.007 kW	127.5 m	47°37′31″N 68°50′52″W
CFTF-DT-4	Forestville	4 (VHF)	2.7 kW	123.9 m	48°48′32″N 69°0′28″W
CFTF-DT-5	Baie-Comeau	9 (VHF)	0.864 kW	96.8 m	49°14′1″N 68°8′24″W
CFTF-DT-6	Rivière-du-Loup (city)	11 (VHF)	0.1 kW	48.2 m	47°51′28″N 69°33′11″W
CFTF-DT-7	Sept-Îles	7 (VHF)	0.743 kW	225.4 m	50°10′19″N 66°44′17″W
CFTF-DT-8	Les Escoumins	33 (UHF)	0.313 kW	87.9 m	48°19′0″N 69°25′41″W
CFTF-DT-9	Gaspé	30 (UHF)	0.125 kW	118.6 m	48°50′15″N 64°29′32″W
CFTF-DT-10	Baie-Saint-Paul	26 (UHF)	0.125 kW	-1.7 m	47°25′37″N 70°31′23″W
CFTF-DT-11	Carleton	29 (UHF)	19.5 kW	421 m	48°8′8″N 66°7′4″W
CJPC-DT	Rimouski	18 (UHF)	0.36 kW	118.2 m	48°25′37″N 68°29′17″W

CFTF-DT was approved by the CRTC for and converted all its transmitters to digital by the August 31, 2011, digital transition deadline, including its transmitters that were not required to convert by this deadline. Only its transmitters in Rivière-du-Loup were obligated to convert, as Rivière-du-Loup was a mandatory market for digital television conversion.
