= CFVS-DT =

Television station in Val-d'Or, Quebec

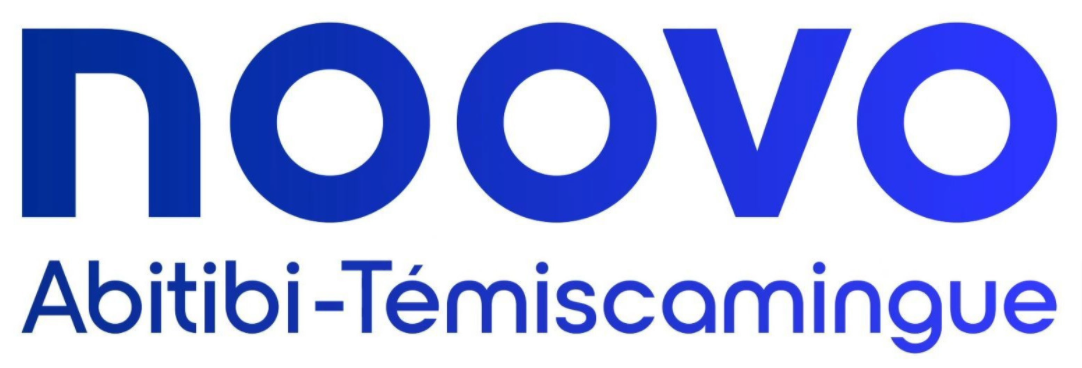
- Val-d'Or–Rouyn-Noranda, Quebec; Canada
- City: Val-d'Or, Quebec
- Channels: Digital: 15 (UHF); Virtual: 25
- Branding: Noovo Abitibi-Témiscamingue

Programming
- Affiliations: 25.1: Noovo

Ownership
- Owner: RNC MEDIA Inc.
- Sister stations: CFEM-DT

History
- First air date: January 19, 1987
- Former call signs: CFVS-TV (1987–2011)
- Former channel number: Analog: 25 (1987–2011)

Technical information
- Licensing authority: CRTC
- ERP: CFVS-DT: 52 kW; CFVS-DT-1: 32 kW
- HAAT: CFVS-DT: 182.9 m (600 ft); CFVS-DT-1: 164.6 m (540 ft)
- Transmitter coordinates: CFVS-DT: 48°25′17″N 77°50′49″W; CFVS-DT-1: 48°15′52″N 79°2′38″W
- Translator(s): CFVS-DT-1 20 Rouyn-Noranda

Links
- Website: Noovo Abitibi-Témiscamingue

CFVS-DT (channel 25), branded as Noovo Abitibi-Témiscamingue, is a French-language television station licensed to Val-d'Or, Quebec, Canada, serving as the Noovo affiliate for the Abitibi-Témiscamingue region. It is owned by RNC Media alongside TVA affiliate CFEM-DT (channel 13), licensed to the neighbouring city of Rouyn-Noranda. The two stations share studios on Avenue Murdoch and Avenue de la Saint Anne in Rouyn-Noranda; CFVS-DT's transmitter is located near Route Québec Lithium in La Corne. The station operates a rebroadcaster in Rouyn-Noranda (CFVS-DT-1) on UHF channel 20. Both transmitters flash-cut to digital on September 1, 2011.

== Subchannel ==
Subchannel of CFVS-DT
Subchannel	Res.	Short name	Programming
25.1	1080i	CFVS-DT	Noovo
