= CFGS-DT =

Television station in Gatineau, Quebec

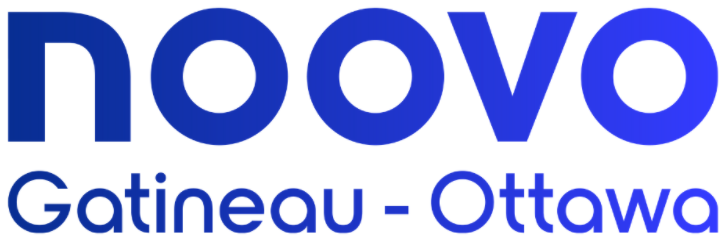
- Gatineau, Quebec; Ottawa, Ontario; Canada
- City: Gatineau, Quebec
- Channels: Digital: 34 (UHF); Virtual: 34
- Branding: Noovo Gatineau–Ottawa

Programming
- Affiliations: 34.1: Noovo

Ownership
- Owner: RNC MEDIA Inc.
- Sister stations: TV: CHOT-DT; Radio: CHLX-FM

History
- First air date: September 7, 1986
- Former channel numbers: Analog: 49 (UHF, 1986–2001), 34 (UHF, 2001–2011)

Technical information
- Licensing authority: CRTC
- ERP: 93.3 kW
- HAAT: 358 m (1,175 ft)
- Transmitter coordinates: 45°30′9″N 75°50′59″W

Links
- Website: Noovo Gatineau–Ottawa

CFGS-DT (channel 34), branded as Noovo Gatineau–Ottawa, is a television station in Gatineau, Quebec, Canada, serving the National Capital Region as an affiliate of the French-language network Noovo. The station is owned by RNC Media, as part of a twinstick with TVA affiliate CHOT-DT (channel 40). The two stations share studios on Rue Jean-Proulx and Rue Buteau in the former city of Hull; CFGS-DT's transmitter is located at Camp Fortune in Chelsea, Quebec.

CFGS-DT is the largest Noovo station that is not owned and operated by the network. It is also the second major network affiliate in Canada in a media market that is not owned by its associated network, after CHOT-DT.

== Overview ==
It was originally broadcast on UHF channel 49 from its debut on September 7, 1986, until moving to its current over-the-air channel position in 2001. However, prior to changing its listings to national listings only, TV Guide always had this station listed as Channel 49.

CFGS's operation is considerably smaller than sister station CHOT—the station only airs a 10-minute local newscast weekdays at 5:30 p.m. anchored by Louka Jacques, along with brief news updates in the morning and in the evening. There are only two anchors (one for the morning news update and one for the 5:30 p.m. news). For a brief period in 2006, there was an occasional commentary by former MP Françoise Boivin on stories that made headlines.

== Technical information ==
=== Subchannels ===
Subchannel of CFGS-DT
Subchannel	Res.	Short name	Programming
34.1	1080i	CFGS HD	Noovo

=== Analog-to-digital conversion ===
The analog television shutdown and digital conversion took place on August 31, 2011; however, CFGS-TV was granted a temporary extension for their analog broadcasts. CFGS-DT began its digital broadcasts on its current assigned analog channel, UHF 34, on October 31, 2011.
