= TV Guide (Canada) =

Canadian magazine

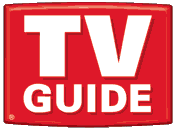
- Categories: Listings magazine Entertainment website
- Frequency: Weekly (1977–2006) (later operated as a website from 2006–2014)
- First issue: January 1977 (the American version was sold in Canada prior to then)
- Final issue: November 25, 2006 (became website thereafter; occasional print specials since then)
- Company: TC Transcontinental
- Country: Canada
- Language: English
- Website: www.tvguide.ca//TV%20Guide%20Canada/tvlisting/

TV Guide was a weekly Canadian magazine that provided television program listings information as well as television-related news, celebrity interviews and gossip, film reviews, crossword puzzles and horoscopes. It originated as a domestic version of the American TV Guide magazine before being spun off into a separate print publication that was published from 1977 to 2006, at which point it ceased publishing and its content was migrated entirely to a website (though occasional print specials have been published as recently as 2010).

The magazine's original format consisted of several editorial articles on television programming and/or issues related to television, with the bulk of the magazine featuring programming listings specific to the market served by a particular edition.

== History ==
Beginning with the release of the first issue of TV Guide in the United States on April 3, 1953, the Canadian edition of the magazine was virtually the same as the American publication, right down to the advertisements featured in the colour section (until the mid-1970s, some Canadian TV Guide editions were also sold in some markets bordering the United States). The only differences between the two publications were the price (in 1972, the American edition sold for 15¢ per copy, while in Canada, it sold for 25¢ per copy, equivalent to $1.87 in 2025) and the publisher. The Canadian edition was published by McMurray Publishing, a subsidiary of Triangle Publications, an American-based firm owned by Walter H. Annenberg, who acquired several local television listings magazines in 1953 to form the nucleus for the national edition of TV Guide (this was acknowledged in a notice featured in the "Saturday" listings, "This Canadian magazine is distributed, assembled and prepared by McMurray Publishing Company, Ltd...."). At least eleven editions were available across Canada, which featured localized television listings for the country's major cities, as well as including columns that are pertinent to Canadian television (such as "The Canadian Report", which replaced "The Doan Report" in Canadian editions).

In January 1977, Telemedia acquired the Canadian rights to the TV Guide name and split it off into a separate magazine. Originally, it incorporated some of the same stories and covers as the American version (and utilized a similar logo to that of the American version), but eventually began publishing completely different editorial content, often with a Canadian focus – although the Canadian edition also published features and photos on American productions that did not appear in the American version. Telemedia continued to use the same logo and staple-bound manufacturing used at the time of the split by the American TV Guide publication until the late 1990s, even as its former American counterpart had updated its logo and adopted a perfect square binding process during the 1980s. Similarly, while the American TV Guide began reducing its television listings in favor of incorporating more editorial content, until the 2000s, the bulk of the Canadian magazine's content remained the localized listings. A series of sharp price increases occurred, with the newsstand cost of each issue rising to 30¢, 35¢, and ultimately close to $1 per issue.

In 2000, Telemedia sold the magazine to Transcontinental Media. Beginning with the February 24, 2004 issue, TV Guide switched from its longtime digest size format and began printing as a larger full-size magazine (comparably similar in size to a comic book) that would offer more program listings. Magazine executives cited the need to keep the page count reasonable while listing an increased number of broadcast and cable channels as the primary rationale for the upgrade in the publication's print size. With the change in format, came the decision by the magazine to cease printing 24-hour listings (following a similar move by the American version in July 2004); the overnight listings were removed entirely in order to focus on providing listings for time periods of higher viewership, which elicited complaints from readers.

Beginning with the November 5, 2005, issue, the six remaining local editions were eliminated, being replaced by two editions covering different regions of Canada: one for the western half of the country (covering the Pacific, Mountain and Central time zones) and one for the eastern half of the country (covering the Eastern and Atlantic time zones). After receiving numerous complaints about the new format (which severely condensed cross-country listings), changes were introduced with the November 26 issue. TV Guide introduced the magazine's first ever two-week edition, which was issued for the 16-day period from December 24, 2005 to January 6, 2006. The listings began to be printed entirely in colour, but the number of channels covered were further reduced.

On October 19, 2006, Transcontinental announced it would cease publication of the print edition of TV Guide, with the last issue to be released on newsstands on November 20 (issued for November 25 to December 1), and would transition it into a "web publication", as the defunct magazine's website would be expanded. Although it was not the first publication to abandon its print edition in favor of a digital version, TV Guide was one of the first major magazines in Canada to make the conversion. By July 2014, the American edition of TV Guide (which in the time since the demise of the TV Guide Canada publication, has phased out localized television listings) began to be distributed in Canada once again.

== TVGuide.ca ==
On December 1, 2006, TV Guide launched its new website at tvguide.ca, hosted by Sympatico/MSN. By 2008, the site began to source its program listings from the American-based entertainment website Zap2It. While TV Guide embraced the use of the internet to distribute content, it still occasionally published printed magazine specials on noteworthy events, under the tvguide.ca imprint. These specials included a special tribute to Diana, Princess of Wales (which was released on May 6, 2007); a special issue to celebrate the 10th anniversary of Food Network Canada (which was released on October 4, 2010); and a Prince William - Catherine royal visit special, released in the fall of 2011.

In December 2012, tvguide.ca was replaced with The Loop, Sympatico's lifestyle and entertainment portal, which incorporated TV Guide's television news and listings. TV Guide owner Transcontinental Media discontinued TV Guide's online editorial content on July 2, 2014, ceasing the Canadian edition's existence after 61 years; its listings department, which distributes programming schedules to newspapers and The Loop owner Bell Canada's pay television services (Bell Satellite TV, Bell Aliant TV and Bell Fibe TV) will remain operational.
