= CFKS-DT =

Television station in Quebec, Canada

- Sherbrooke, Quebec; Canada
- Channels: Digital: 30 (UHF); Virtual: 30
- Branding: Noovo

Programming
- Affiliations: 30.1: Noovo

Ownership
- Owner: Bell Media; (Groupe V Média inc.)
- Sister stations: CIMO-FM, CITE-FM-1

History
- First air date: September 7, 1986
- Former call signs: CFKS-TV (1986–2011)
- Former channel numbers: Analog: 30 (UHF, 1986–2011)

Technical information
- Licensing authority: CRTC
- ERP: 4.63 kW
- HAAT: 591.19 m (1,940 ft)
- Transmitter coordinates: 45°18′43″N 72°14′30″W

Links
- Website: Noovo

CFKS-DT (channel 30) is a television station in Sherbrooke, Quebec, Canada, owned and operated by the French-language network Noovo, a division of Bell Media. It is a de facto semi-satellite of Montreal flagship CFJP-DT. CFKS-DT's studios are located on Boulevard Industriel/Route 220 and Boulevard de Portland in Sherbrooke, and its transmitter is located in Orford.

== History ==
The station went to air on September 7, 1986. It was originally launched by Cogeco as an independently owned affiliate of TQS, which was then owned by Jean Pouliot. It became an owned-and-operated station of the network in 2001 when Cogeco became the network's primary owner. The station was part of V's takeover by Remstar. Since the rebranding of the TQS network on August 31, 2009, CFKS has dropped all non-network programming and became a de facto semi-satellite of Montreal owned-and-operated station CFJP-TV.

== Technical information ==
=== Subchannel ===
Subchannel of CFKS-DT
Subchannel	Res.	Short name	Programming
30.1	1080i	CFKS-DT	Noovo

=== Analog-to-digital conversion ===
CFKS-DT ceased broadcasting in analog and flash cut to digital on August 1, 2011. Digital television receivers display CFKS-TV's virtual channel as 30.

In filings from V to the CRTC with respect to Broadcasting Notice of Consultation CRTC 2010-169, V stated that it was debating whether to install digital a transmitter in Saguenay due to financial reasons, and if it did install one, it might be just before the deadline or well after the deadline. V later filed regarding the same proceeding that it was in talks with Télé-Québec to partner up in order to reduce the cost of installing transmitters.
