= CFKM-DT =

Television station in Quebec, Canada

- Trois-Rivières, Quebec; Canada
- Channels: Digital: 34 (UHF); Virtual: 16
- Branding: Noovo

Programming
- Affiliations: 16.1: Noovo

Ownership
- Owner: Bell Media; (Groupe V Média inc.)
- Sister stations: CHEY-FM, CIGB-FM

History
- First air date: September 7, 1986
- Former call signs: CFKM-TV (1986–2011)
- Former channel numbers: Analog: 16 (UHF, 1986–2011)

Technical information
- Licensing authority: CRTC
- ERP: 9.4 kW
- HAAT: 395.7 m (1,298 ft)
- Transmitter coordinates: 46°29′33″N 72°39′7″W

Links
- Website: Noovo

CFKM-DT (channel 16, cable channel 5) is a television station in Trois-Rivières, Quebec, Canada, owned and operated by the French-language network Noovo, a division of Bell Media. It is a de facto semi-satellite of Montreal flagship CFJP-DT. CFKM-DT's studios are located on Boulevard Saint-Jean/Route 40 in Trois-Rivières, and its transmitter is located on Rue Principale in Notre-Dame-du-Mont-Carmel.

== History ==
The station went to air on September 7, 1986. It was originally launched by Cogeco as an independently owned affiliate of TQS, which was then owned by Jean Pouliot. It became an O&O of the network in 2001 when Cogeco became the network's primary owner. The station was part of V's proposed takeover by Remstar. Since the rebranding of the TQS network on August 31, 2009, CFKM has dropped all non-network programming and became a de facto semi-satellite of Montreal owned-and-operated station CFJP-TV.

== Technical information ==
=== Subchannel ===
Subchannel of CFKM-DT
Subchannel	Res.	Short name	Programming
16.1	1080i	CFKM	Noovo

=== Analog-to-digital conversion ===
CFKM shut down its analog signal on channel 16 in early July 2011 and began broadcasting in digital at the same time. The station was the first in Canada to complete the digital transition. Digital television receivers display CFKM's virtual channel as 16.
