= Ici Radio-Canada Télé =

Canadian French-language public TV network

- Logo used since 2016
- Type: Public broadcasting free-to-air television network
- Country: Canada
- Broadcast area: Canada, reaching bordering regions via overspill of the Canadian terrestrial network
- Affiliates: List of member stations
- Headquarters: Nouvelle Maison Radio-Canada,Montreal, Quebec

Programming
- Language: French
- Picture format: 720p HDTV (downscaled to 480i for the SDTV feed)

Ownership
- Owner: Canadian Broadcasting Corporation
- Sister channels: Ici Radio-Canada Première

History
- Launched: 6 September 1952; 74 years ago
- Former names: Télévision de Radio-Canada (1952-2013)

Links
- Website: ici.radio-canada.ca/tele (in French)

Availability

Streaming media
- RiverTV: Over-the-top TV

Ici Radio-Canada Télé (stylized as ICI Radio-Canada Télé, and sometimes abbreviated as Ici Télé or Radio-Canada) is a Canadian French-language free-to-air television network spun off of Ici Radio-Canada Première, owned by the Canadian Broadcasting Corporation (known in French as Société Radio-Canada [SRC]), the national public broadcaster. Its English-language counterpart is CBC Television. "Ici" in the context of the name means "this is" in French.

Its headquarters are at the Nouvelle Maison de Radio-Canada in Montreal, which is also home to the network's flagship station, CBFT-DT, as well as the master control facilities of all of its owned-and-operated stations nationwide. Until the 2012 closedown of the CBC / Radio-Canada rebroadcaster network, it was the only francophone network in Canada to broadcast terrestrially in all Canadian provinces.

== Programming ==
This network is considered more popular than CBC Television. It does not face such intense competition from American networks. Despite this, it has trailed TVA in the ratings for most of the last 30 years, roughly as long as its English counterpart has trailed CTV. Its ratings have improved with offbeat sitcoms, and the talk show Tout le monde en parle. With this success, however, have come accusations of dumbing down. For instance, Tout le monde en parle replaced the long-running Sunday night arts series Les Beaux Dimanches.

News programming is anchored by Le Téléjournal, which airs nightly at 10:00 p.m. Local newscasts, which air during the lunch and supper hours, now also carry the Téléjournal name, such as Le Téléjournal Montréal. The regional newscasts used to be called Ce Soir (This Evening).

=== Le Téléjournal ===
All Radio-Canada newscasts are broadcast under the name Le Téléjournal. The main evening broadcast airs most nights at 10:00 p.m. local time (11:00 p.m. in the Maritimes). Le Téléjournal is also seen live and as a repeat broadcast on a sister cable news channel RDI and on time-delay worldwide via an international francophone channel TV5. There are no morning newscasts. Local and regional news also takes the Téléjournal name followed by the name of a city, region, or province, or by the time of day (for example Le Téléjournal Montréal, Le Téléjournal Midi, etc.) CBVT-DT Quebec City, CBLFT-DT Toronto and CBOFT-DT Ottawa, and CBAFT-DT in the Atlantic provinces run local midday bulletins. In contrast, all affiliates run supper-hour bulletins which run from Monday to Fridays, except for CBVT-DT, CBOFT-DT and CBAFT-DT, which run seven days a week.

=== Current affairs ===
Investigative reporting is broadcast weekly as Enquête. In 2008, the program tested the safety levels of tasers in the wake of concerns raised after a Polish immigrant died after RCMP police officers fired a Taser in Vancouver International Airport. Other shows such as Découverte raised concerns about the safety of overhead bridges in Montreal after the collapse of a bridge in 2007.

There is also weekly programming on political affairs concerning the National Assembly of Quebec and the House of Commons of Canada with Les Coulisses du pouvoir (The Corridors of Power). Science and technology issues are covered in Découverte and agricultural and rural topics in La semaine verte. Consumer affairs are covered in L'épicerie and Facture.

=== Sports ===
From 1952 to 2004, the network was home to weekly French-language broadcasts of hockey matches involving the Montreal Canadiens, called La Soirée du hockey. The show was discontinued when broadcast rights reverted to RDS. Viewers outside Quebec were able to continue watching games via Radio-Canada stations until 2006 when RDS became exclusive broadcasters. Radio-Canada was also the home of the Montreal Alouettes before moving to RDS. It was also home for many years to French-language television broadcasts of the Montreal Expos.

After briefly losing the rights to V and RDS as part of the CTV/Rogers consortium, CBC/Radio-Canada re-gained rights to the Olympic Games in 2014, with Radio-Canada as main French-language broadcaster. The CBC's rights have since been renewed through 2024.

=== Entertainment ===
The most popular entertainment shows on the network are variety shows such as Tout le monde en parle and M pour musique, sketch shows like Les invincibles and Et Dieu créa... Laflaque and dramas such as Les Hauts et les bas de Sophie Paquin, Virginie and Tout sur moi.

Tout le monde en parle in particular is a long-running talk show imported from the same show of the same name in France and has featured high-profile guests, such as Julie Couillard and former Action démocratique du Québec leader Mario Dumont. A weekly music show called Studio 12 appears on Sundays.

Although the bulk of the prime-time schedule is Quebec-produced, a few dubbed shows from the US have also aired in prime-time, such as Lost (as Perdus), Desperate Housewives (Beautées désepérées), and Ugly Betty (Chère Betty).

On New Year's Eve, Radio-Canada presents Bye Bye, a sketch comedy special satirizing news stories and events from the past year (comparable to the Royal Canadian Air Farce New Year's Eve specials formerly shown by the English-language CBC Television). In recent years it has become the most-watched program of the year on Quebecois television; the 2021 edition of Bye Bye was the most-watched program in Quebecois television history, and four out of the top five overall were editions of Bye Bye.

=== Children ===
- Like CBC Television, ICI Télé also airs a morning programming block named Zone Jeunesse and Zone des petits from 5:30am to 9:00 am (weekdays) and 6:00am to 10:00am (weekends)
- The most popular children's show on Radio-Canada was Passe-Partout, which was in production for 10 years and broadcast until 1987. It was for some time a co-production with Radio-Québec.

=== Regional programming ===
Non-news regional programming is usually programmed for broadcast on weekends. It is limited to arts and culture and typically airs outside Quebec, especially in Atlantic Canada and Western Canada. For example, Zeste broadcasts on stations in Western Canada on Saturday early evenings, while Luc et Luc airs on Sunday evenings in Atlantic Canada.

== Stations and affiliates ==
Of Canada's three major French-language television networks, Radio-Canada was the only one that, until 2012, broadcast terrestrially in all Canadian provinces. Except for Atlantic Canada, where a single station serves all four provinces, the network has at least one originating station in every province. These stations serve every major market in French and English Canada, with privately owned affiliates serving smaller markets in Quebec.

Unlike CBC Television affiliates, which often had several alternative programming sources, private Radio-Canada affiliates, when they still existed prior to 2021, were effectively constrained to carry network programming throughout the day in a pattern with no preemptions. The only exceptions were for local and regional programming and commercials.

In 2007, Radio-Canada announced its intention to terminate its long-time affiliation with three regional affiliates in Sherbrooke, Trois-Rivières, and Saguenay. These stations were owned by Cogeco, at the time a majority owner of commercial rival TQS (now Noovo). By the end of the year, TQS had filed for bankruptcy; as part of exiting bankruptcy, a deal was announced the following spring for Radio-Canada to directly acquire the stations. The transaction was approved by the CRTC on June 26, 2008. Only the stations in Rouyn-Noranda (CKRN-DT, which closed in 2018) and Rivière-du-Loup (CKRT-DT, which closed in 2021) remained as private affiliates, rather than owned-and-operated stations.

On February 27, 2009, CBC/Radio-Canada President Hubert Lacroix admitted at the Empire Club of Canada that the corporation is facing a budget shortfall and as a result some services may be forced to close down and/or stations merged or sold off, saying:

"La crise économique nous force à revoir toutes les facettes de nos activités."
("The economic crisis forced us to review all facets of our activities.")

It is not yet clear how the announcement will affect stations owned by either CBC Television or Télévision de Radio-Canada, however it is envisaged that regional news programming may be merged in the regions outside Quebec.

Radio-Canada once operated an extensive network of rebroadcasters, but they were closed by 2012.

== Digital terrestrial television transition ==
SRC converted its originating station transmitters to digital as part of the digital transition deadline in mandatory markets, which took place on August 31, 2011.

On July 31, 2012, all of the corporation's 620 analogue television transmitters were permanently shut down, leaving CBC's English and French television network with a total of 27 digital transmitters.

== Slogans and branding ==
The network's logo until 2013; the "Télévision" portion was often excluded in promos, leaving only the CBC logo.

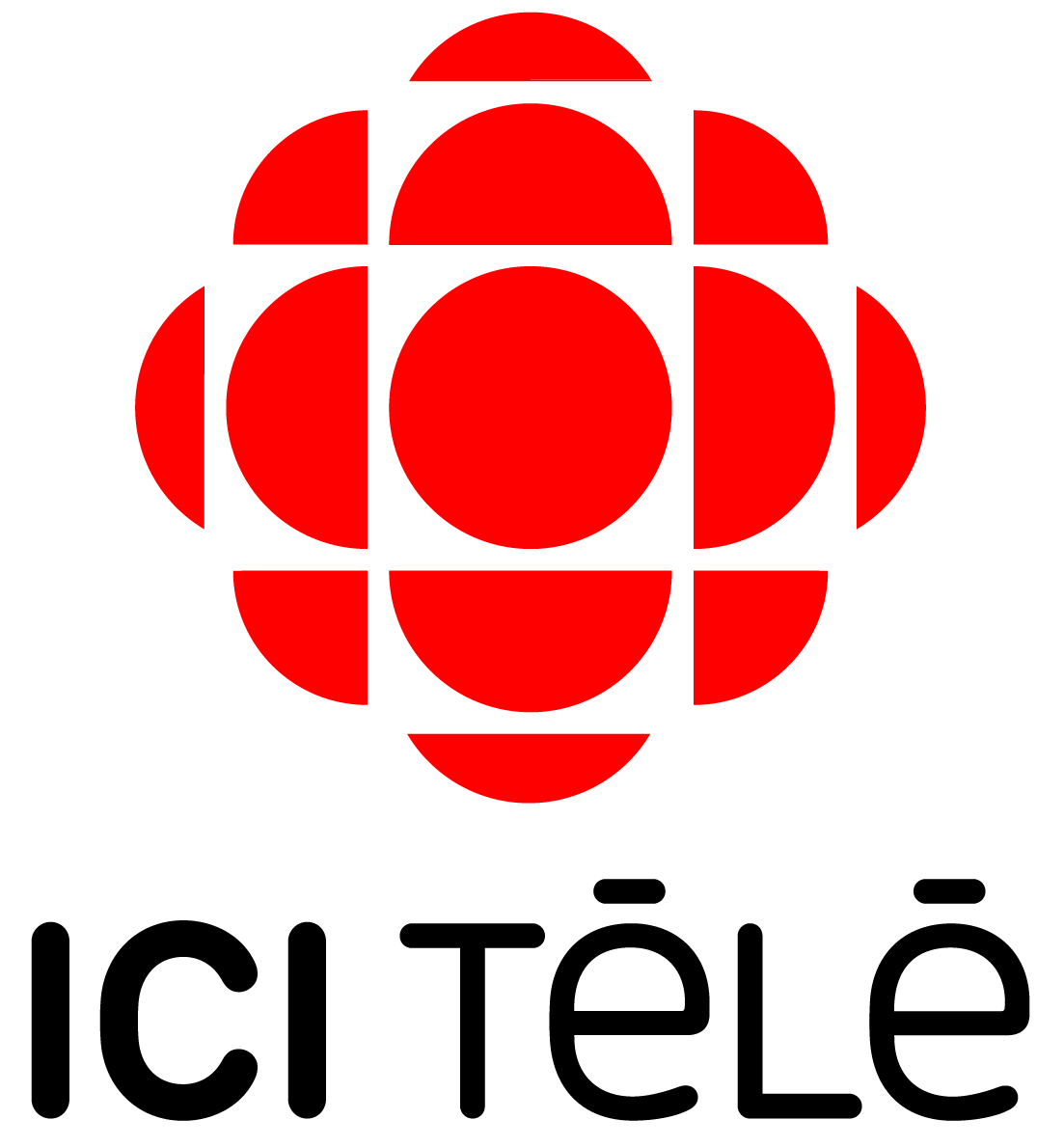
The Network's first logo after the "ICI" rebrand, used from 2013 to 2016.

For most of its history, the network was branded as Radio-Canada. In television listings such as TV Guide or TV Hebdo, where space limitations usually require television networks to be referred to by a three-letter abbreviation; while its full name was previously Télévision de Radio-Canada, the network was normally coded as SRC (for Société Radio-Canada, the French language corporate name of the CBC as a whole). While the network experimented with using SRC as its on-air brand in the 1990s, within a few months it reverted to using "Radio-Canada" for nearly all verbal references. The experiment ended later in the decade. In 2009 Radio-Canada refreshed its branding featuring the word "Télévision" underneath the corporate logo; in promos, it features the logo, without any wording or slogans.

On June 5, 2013, it was announced that as part of an overall effort to unify the CBC's French-language platforms and outlets under a common name, Télévision de Radio-Canada was to be renamed Ici Télé on September 9, 2013—a nod to its longtime system cue dating back to the 1930s on radio, Ici Radio-Canada (This is Radio-Canada). The re-branding was panned by critics and politicians, who felt that the new brand was too confusing, and criticized the CBC's plans to downplay the historic "Radio-Canada" name as a viewer-facing brand, along with the reported $400,000 cost of the new campaign in the midst of budget cuts. In response to the criticism, Hubert Lacroix announced a compromise, where the Radio-Canada name would be added to the revised branding, resulting in Ici Radio-Canada Télé as its official name.

=== Slogans ===
- 1966–1973: Regardez bien regardez Radio-Canada (Watch carefully, watch Radio-Canada)
- 1973–1979: Partout pour nous, Radio-Canada est là (Radio-Canada is in everywhere for us)
- 1979–1980: Faut voir ça (Must see that)
- 1980–1981: Je choisis Radio-Canada (I choose Radio-Canada)
- 1981–1982: Radio-Canada d'abord (Radio-Canada first)
- 1982–1983: Soyez au poste (Be at the station)
- 1983–1985(?): Vous méritez ce qu'il y'a de mieux (You deserve the best)
- 1985 La Télévision de l'heure (The television of the hour)
- 1989–1990: Pour Vous Avant Tout (Everything for you)
- 1994–2006: (System cue/closedown): Le réseau national (The national network/Public broadcasting)
- 1992–late 2004: Ici Radio-Canada (This is Radio-Canada): This is what the announcer says during the system cue, when the network logo is displayed on-screen, but in the early 2000s, it became a promotional slogan in its own right, and by 2013, was repurposed as a brand for all Radio-Canada operations.
- 2005: Vous allez voir (You are going to see/You will see).
- 2006: Ici comme dans la vie (Here as in life) and Radio-Canada, source d'information (Radio-Canada, source of information) for news promos.
- 2007: On l'aime déjà (We already love it)
- 2008: Bienvenue à Radio-Canada
- 2009: Mon monde est à Radio-Canada (My world is on Radio-Canada)
- 2013: Tout est possible (Everything is possible)
- 2016: Pour toute la vie Ici Radio Canada Télé (For life, Ici Radio Canada Télé)
- since 2022: Plein la vie (full of life)

== Ombudsmen ==
The ombudsman of Radio-Canada has been Pierre Champoux since July 2021. He was preceded by Guy Gendron (2016-2021), Pierre Tourangeau (2011–2016), Julie Miville-Dechêne (2007–2011), Renaud Gilbert (2000–2007), Marcel Pépin (1997–1999), Mario Cardinal (1993–1997) and Bruno Gauron (1992).

== High-definition television ==
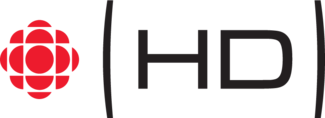

On March 5, 2005, Télévision de Radio-Canada launched an HD simulcast of its Montreal station CBFT-DT. Since that time they have also launched HD simulcasts in Quebec City (CBVT-DT), Ottawa (CBOFT-DT), Toronto (CBLFT-DT) and Vancouver (CBUFT-DT). The HD feed is available through both pay television services, and through ATSC digital terrestrial television on the following channels:

- Quebec City: 12 (11.1)
- Montreal: 19 (2.1)
- Ottawa: 22 (9.1)
- Toronto: 24 (25.1)
- Vancouver: 26 (26.1)

On September 10, 2007, the network (as well as sister cable news network RDI) began broadcasting all programming solely in the 16:9 aspect ratio with few exceptions, and began letterboxing its widescreen feed for standard definition viewers.

== International coverage ==
Certain shows such as Virginie and Le Téléjournal are carried on international francophone channels TV5Monde.

As with CBC Television, Ici Télé stations can be viewed over-the-air in the northern United States including the border areas of eastern Maine via CBAFT-DT Moncton or CKRT-DT Rivière-du-Loup; northern and central New England via CKSH-DT Sherbrooke; the border areas of New York and Vermont via CBFT-DT Montreal, CBOFT-DT Ottawa-Gatineau or CBLFT-DT Toronto; or in northwest Washington via CBUFT-DT Vancouver.

== Notable staff ==
- Marcel Desjardins — televised news editor-in-chief and director
- Pierre Dufault — sports journalist
- Pierre Nadeau — journalist, television presenter and producer
- Jocelyne Blouin — on-air meteorologist from 1978 to 2011.
