= Noovo =

Canadian French-language television network

- Type: Terrestrial television network
- Country: Canada
- Broadcast area: Nationwide
- Headquarters: Montreal, Quebec; Quebec City, Quebec

Programming
- Language: French

Ownership
- Owner: BCE, Inc.
- Parent: Bell Media
- Sister channels: Canal D; Canal Vie; Investigation; Z; CTV Television Network (English language); CTV 2 (English language); CTV News Channel (English language); BNN Bloomberg (English language); CP24 (English language)

History
- Launched: September 7, 1986; 40 years ago
- Former names: TQS (1986–2009); V (2009–2020)

Links
- Website: www.crave.ca/fr/noovo (in French)

Noovo is a Canadian French-language terrestrial television network owned by Bell Media, a division of BCE Inc. Originally launched in 1986 as Télévision Quatre‑Saisons (TQS), it rebranded to "V" in 2009 and to "Noovo" on August 31, 2020. The rebrand unified the conventional TV channel and its digital platform Noovo.ca under one integrated brand, targeting younger audiences and Francophone pop culture in Quebec.

The network was launched in 1986 as Télévision Quatre-Saisons (TQS), and was owned by the Pouliot family until Vidéotron acquired the network in 1995, before being resold to Quebecor. Quebecor then divested TQS in 2001 who then sold the network to a joint venture of Bell Globemedia and Cogeco until Remstar bought the network in 2008, who renamed it V on August 31, 2009. It was the namesake and flagship property of V Media Group (now known as Remstar Media Group), a separate company majority-owned by Remstar owner Maxime Rémillard (partially through Remstar). V was re-acquired by Bell Media in May 2020, after which it was renamed Noovo on August 31, 2020. The name "Noovo" is a stylized phonetic spelling of "nouveau", the French word for "new".

The network has long been a distant third in the ratings to TVA and Ici Radio-Canada Télé. However, it has produced a number of major hit series in Quebec.

== History ==
In 1968, the Canadian Radio-television and Telecommunications Commission (CRTC) first expressed interest in the establishment of a third French-language commercial television service in the province of Quebec, to compete with Télévision de Radio-Canada and the loose association of independent stations that eventually became TVA. However the CRTC did not call on applications for licences.

In 1972, the CRTC said it was prepared to receive licence applications in order to authorize a third commercial television service in Quebec, although it was not until 1974 when the CRTC granted licences to Télé Inter-Cité Québec Ltée. to operate TV stations in Montreal (channel 29) and in Quebec City (channel 2). Télé Inter-Cité found itself unable to launch the network due to materials shortages and delays in equipment delivery; the CRTC granted a time extension to 1976. Civitas Corp., owner of several radio stations in Quebec and a denied applicant for the same channels a year earlier, filed to buy Téle Inter-Cité, but the CRTC denied the purchase and noted that the proposal to reduce local programming commitments substantially altered the original accepted application. Unable to go forward due to what it called "economic reasons", the firm surrendered the licences for revocation in 1976.

Logo used from 1993 to 1998. The graphic portion was first used when the network launched in 1986.

On November 15, 1984, the CRTC launched another call for applications in response to a bid from Cogeco. In 1985, it held public hearings in Montreal to examine competing applications from partners Cogeco Inc. (60.3%) and Moffat Communications (39.7%), and another application by the Pouliot family, owners of Montreal's CTV affiliate, CFCF-TV and radio stations CFCF (later CINW, now defunct) and CFQR-FM (now CKBE-FM). Both applications applied to launch television stations in Montreal and Quebec City. On September 6 of that year, the CRTC approved the application of the Pouliot family and its company, Réseau de Télévision Quatre-Saisons Inc., noting its existing facilities in Montreal and more realistic revenue projections compared to Cogeco. TQS was authorized to operate a French-language TV station in Montreal with an effective radiated power of 566,000 watts on channel 35. The CRTC initially denied the Quebec City bid on grounds of insufficient local advertising revenue; it was, however, allowed to set up a full-time rebroadcaster of the Montreal station there.

1998-2006 logo, the logo would sometimes feature a black sheep, to coincide with its slogan, "Le mouton noir de la télé" (The Black Sheep of Television).

The network launched on September 7, 1986, as Télévision Quatre-Saisons ("Four Seasons Television"). The flagship was CFJP-TV in Montreal, with CFAP-TV in Quebec City as a full-time rebroadcaster. The network had affiliates in five other cities. As part of the launch, the existing expansion plans to add two storeys to the CFCF building were expanded with another two floors. The network—already lean, employing 125 additional personnel on top of CFCF's 500—spent most of its earlier years in severe financial trouble. At one point, the revenues from CFCF-TV were all that were keeping the network afloat. It was, however, able to launch affiliates in Val-d'Or in 1987 and Rivière-du-Loup in 1988, as well as upgrade its Quebec City rebroadcaster to a full-fledged station in 1989. In its early years, it was known for advertising in English on its then-sister radio stations.

In 1995, the Pouliots sold their media holdings to Quebec cable company Vidéotron, who already owned TVA, Quebec's other private commercial network. Due to monopoly ownership concerns, Vidéotron immediately turned around and sold TQS to Quebecor, a newspaper publisher. Around this time, the network began branding primarily as "TQS"; for its first decade on the air, most verbal references had used "Quatre-Saisons."

Quebecor acquired Vidéotron in 2001, and put TQS back on the market. Later in 2001, TQS was bought by a joint venture of CTVglobemedia (then known as Bell Globemedia) and Cogeco, another cable company. Cogeco owned a 60 percent controlling interest in the venture and handled most of operations, while CTVglobemedia owned 40 percent. The acquisition, in a sense, reunited it with CFCF, which had been bought by CTV a year earlier.

=== Bankruptcy protection ===
Used from late 2006 to late 2008

On December 18, 2007, TQS filed for bankruptcy protection. At this point the network was given 30 days in which to reorganize and revamp itself, with the goal of finding a viable solution to pay off its creditors. On January 16, 2008, a judge extended the grace period for an additional 45 days.

Montreal's newspaper La Presse reported on January 15 that Rogers Communications and RNC Media were each interested in acquiring some individual stations within the network, although RNC Media later denied the report and Rogers declined to comment. On February 25, 2008, the network confirmed that it had received four purchase bids, although it did not disclose the identities of the bidders.

=== Remstar's takeover ===
On March 10, 2008, the Quebec Superior Court approved the sale of TQS to Remstar Corporation, a Montreal-based television and film producer and distributor. Creditors, who were owed more than $33 million, voted to accept the Remstar proposal in May. The CRTC approved the application on June 26, 2008.

The last logo of TQS, used from 2008 to 2009

Remstar announced on April 23, 2008, that 270 jobs would be cut at TQS, while the information services division would be abolished entirely — thus eliminating all newscasts from the network starting in September 2008. While the CRTC ordered Remstar to retain local news programming on the network, it did take the network's precarious financial situation into account by allowing a reduced amount of local news programming until the network's licence renewal hearing in 2011.

At the network's fall upfronts presentation for 2009, the network announced a repositioning plan, including a shedding of the TQS moniker and its black sheep logo in favour of the name "V", complete with a black-and-gold circle logo with a stylized letter V. The V name reflected the channel's new mission of "vedettes" (stars), "vitesse" (speed), "voyages" (trips), and "vice ou vérité" (vices or truths). Some people jokingly hypothesised that "V" was chosen to honor Rémillard's then girlfriend, Karine Vanasse.

The new program lineup included the daily news and discussion programs Le show du matin, hosted by Gildor Roy, and Dumont 360, hosted by Mario Dumont. V's rebranding took effect on August 31, 2009, at 6 am ET after the infomercial block.

First logo as V, used from 2009 to 2010

=== Sale to Bell Media ===
Last logo as V, used from 2018 to 2020

In July 2019, V Media Group announced that the network would be sold to CTVglobemedia's successor Bell Media pending CRTC approval, leaving the company to focus on its specialty channels Elle Fictions and Max. Bell proposed the addition of expanded in-house news programming, and will also provide advertising and master control services for Elle Fictions and Max.

The sale was approved on April 3, 2020; as a condition of the purchase, the CRTC stated that all five V stations must air five hours of local programming per-week through the 2020-2021 broadcast year, and expanding to eight-and-a-half hours per-week in Montreal and Quebec City by 2021–2022. At least half of all local programming must be locally-reflective. The sale was closed on May 15, 2020.

On August 19, 2020, Bell Media announced that the network would be rebranded as Noovo on August 31, taking its name from V's streaming platform of the same name.

== Programming ==
=== Prime time ===
The network's prime time schedule currently consists predominantly of reality and non-fiction programming, scheduled around Julie Snyder's nightly talk show La Semaine des 4 Julie (The Week of the 4 Julies) at 9 p.m. Scripted entertainment programming currently consists primarily of dubbed versions of English Canadian or American comedy or drama series, rather than original francophone comedy or drama; however, a few Quebec-produced comedy or drama series are also broadcast, including Pour toujours, plus un jour (Forever, Not Another Day), Mon ex à moi (My Ex and Me), Entre deux draps (Pillow Talk) and Max et Livia (Max and Livia).

The network has served as home of multiple Quebecois incarnations of the reality franchise Big Brother, with the most recent incarnation Big Brother Célébrités premiering in 2021.

=== News ===
From the network's launch to its 2008 restructuring, the nightly Le Grand Journal formed the core of Noovo's news programming when it was named TQS.

The newscast would become a factor on the ratings when popular anchor and political commentator Jean-Luc Mongrain was hired as lead presenter in 1999, and the show adopted a harded-edge, tabloid and more aggressive approach, with a mix of hard news, commentary and heavy viewer interaction; the move coincided with TQS moving all of its daily programming to a street-front studio at Quebecor's headquarters. He anchored the program from August 30, 1999, until its final edition aired on August 29, 2008.

The 10 p.m. edition, presented by Denis Lévesque, became increasingly known for its aggressive and often confrontative debates on hot topics, leading to it regularly beating Le Téléjournal on the ratings. Lévesque left TQS shortly before the start of the 2005 season, over a controversy regarding the hiring of presenter Isabelle Maréchal to serve as commentator and newsreader; in an interview with La Presse, he told he didn't want to do "spectacle information", as Maréchal was mostly known for presenting entertainment programming. Eventually, she anchored the 10 p.m. edition during that season, before being replaced by Benoît Dutrizac, freshly hired from Télé-Québec, who anchored a 10 p.m. news talk show, Dutrizac, focusing on interviews and analysis, with the news element relegated to the final part of the slot. The format was not a success, with a conventional news bulletin reinstated in 2007, with Esther Bégin being hired from LCN and presenting it until the closure of the news service.

News programming continued in a reduced form on V, however, outsourced to independent producer ADN5. News summaries of approximately three minutes were inserted into the network's morning and noontime programming, along with a 30-minute newscast weekend evenings. In 2012, the provision on news programming was taken over by a newly formed production division of Montreal-based publishing company Transcontinental, which took over the production of these updates, alongside producing a newly created news-oriented morning show, Ça commence bien !, which attempted to attract viewers away from TVA's Salut, Bonjour! by showcasing content from the group's print and magazine brands. Even after suffering three different host transitions and numerous format changes to make it look closer to its rival, the show would be ultimately unsuccessful and eventually cancelled in 2015. By 2017, the network's news programming evolved after production was taken over by another producer, Attraction Images, now as a full-fledged half-hour bulletin under the title NVL (an abbreviation of "nouvelles", the French term for news), featuring a voiceover anchorless format that blended both network-wide and regionalized news reports similar to the current format of CityNews on the English Canadian Citytv network.

As part of the sale to Bell Media, the company stated that it planned to add in-house newscasts on all five O&O stations, with 90 minutes per-day on weekdays in Montreal and Quebec City, 60 minutes elsewhere, and half-hour weekend newscasts in all markets. On March 11, 2021, Bell announced the details of its revamp of the network's news programming under the title Le Fil (lit. 'The Wire'). The new in-house program, which replaced the outsourced NVL, debuted on March 29, airing twice daily on weekdays: an hour-long news block at 5 p.m., with a half-hour national edition anchored by Noémi Mercier from the Bell Media building at Papineau Avenue in Montreal, followed by half-hour regional editions anchored by Mercier in Montreal, and by Lisa-Marie Blais in Quebec City; and a half-hour block at 10 p.m., consisting of ten minutes of national headlines anchored by Michel Bherer, followed by 20 minutes of regional news anchored by Bherer in Montreal and by Blais in Quebec City. On weekends, a single national edition airs at 9 a.m., structured more as a newsmagazine than as a newscast, anchored by Meeker Guerrier in Montreal. The network's other owned-and-operated stations carry their own regional editions, all broadcast from a centralised studio in Quebec City with Blais anchoring, but still featuring footage and two-ways from locally based reporters; its affiliate stations will continue to produce their own local newscasts in lieu of the regional editions.

Lacking the resources of its well-established competitors, Noovo is leveraging the resources of the Énergie, Rouge and Boom-branded local radio stations owned by Bell Media to complement its own reporting; the combined resources are being promoted under the Noovo Info moniker. Le Fil would have a more informal and personality-based style in comparison to its competitors, with a focus on long-form and human interest stories, analysis and commentary, as well as viewer interaction on social media. Initial reviews were mixed, praising the story selection and unique presentation, but criticising the over-recycling of segments and lack of appropriate imagery during news briefs, as well as no international news, sports or weather segments. Due to low ratings, the early evening edition began adding over time some more conventional elements to increase the pace, whilst retaining some of the magazine elements, making it closer to a conventional newscast.

In May 2022, Mercier announced her departure from Le Fil after signing a deal with Bell Media to produce and present long-form documentaries for the network; she was later replaced by former LCN anchor and TVA reporter Marie-Christine Bergeron, who took over the anchor chair on August 29. The appointment of Bergeron led to the broadcast increasingly taking on a more conventional format, with more live reports and breaking news coverage; additionally, Michel Bherer began presenting a debate and analysis program, Les débatteurs de Noovo, after the late edition of Le Fil, which launched on September 12.

On August 28, 2023, Noovo renamed its news bulletin to Noovo Info (lit. 'Noovo News') to align its online and its TV news operations.

In August 2024, Marie-Claude Paradis-Desfossés, a journalist formerly associated with TVA Nouvelles, was announced as joining Noovo Info. In the same month, the network also reintroduced a half-hour noon newscast, titled Noovo Info 12.

In December 2024, Bell Media announced that it would merge its French and English language newsrooms in Quebec, bringing the Noovo Info and radio news operations together with CTV News Montreal and CJAD.

=== Sports ===
Noovo has long aired a nighttime sports show, beginning with Sports Plus (1986–1998), then 110% (1998–2009), followed by L'attaque à 5 (2009–2010).

Its carriage of live sporting events began with Super Bowl XXI in 1987. It carried games of the National Hockey League, including the Quebec Nordiques from 1988 to 1994 and the Montreal Canadiens from 1994 to 2002. It also aired baseball games of the Montreal Expos from 1994 to 1998. Noovo carries boxing events organized by Groupe Yvon Michel.

In February 2005, the network acquired rights to the 2010 Winter Olympics and 2012 Summer Olympics as part of Canada's Olympic Broadcast Media Consortium (a joint venture of CTVglobemedia and Rogers Media) as the French broadcast television partner, in partnership with RDS (a sister via CTVglobemedia's stake at the time). It shared morning coverage of the 2010 Winter Olympics with RDS, followed by its own afternoon and evening programming. As the network's carriage was limited outside of Quebec (unlike previous rights holder Télévision de Radio-Canada), the non-profit public affairs network CPAC (which has must-carry status nationwide) received special authorization from the CRTC to simulcast the coverage in order to ensure nationwide availability.

=== Movies ===
The network is known to many viewers for Bleu Nuit, a showcase of softcore pornography which formerly broadcast late Saturday nights, similar to The Baby Blue Movie that once aired on Toronto's Citytv.

=== Programming outside Montreal and Quebec City ===
Since the rebranding of the TQS network to V, on August 31, 2009, V's three owned and operated stations (O&Os) outside Montreal and Quebec City have dropped all non-network programming and become de facto repeaters of flagship CFJP-DT in Montreal. Unlike O&O stations, non-owned affiliates of the network, such as CFGS-DT in Gatineau/Ottawa, CJPC-DT in Rimouski, CFTF-DT in Rivière-du-Loup and CFVS-DT in Val-d'Or/Rouyn-Noranda, continue to broadcast local programming.

== Coverage ==
During the analogue era, most of its affiliates operated on the UHF band, and operated at moderate-to-low power compared to their TVA and Radio-Canada counterparts. Even in digital, most affiliates do not have nearly the reach of their TVA and Radio-Canada counterparts.

Unlike TVA, Noovo does not have mandatory cable carriage rights outside Quebec, but may be offered at a cable company's discretion if there is a sufficient local market for French-language television programming. Consequently, the network is not widely available outside Quebec, although some communities in Ontario, New Brunswick and Nova Scotia receive Noovo affiliates on cable.

CFGS-DT in Gatineau is part of the Ottawa television market, and is carried in both analogue and digital on cable systems in nearly all of Eastern Ontario. Eastlink systems in Northeastern Ontario also carry CFGS in both analogue and digital. Rogers Cable systems in Central and Southwestern Ontario and the Greater Toronto Area, offer CFGS on their digital tier. CFTF-DT in Rivière-du-Loup has a rebroadcaster in Edmundston, New Brunswick—the network's only over-the-air transmitter outside Quebec—and is carried in both analogue and digital across most of northern New Brunswick.

To ensure that the network's coverage of the 2010 Winter Olympics reached francophone viewers outside Quebec, its coverage was simulcast on CPAC, which has mandatory carriage on the basic service of all Canadian cable and satellite providers, from February 12 to 28, 2010.

== Audience and market performance ==
In its first year post‑rebrand, Noovo experienced a 10 % increase in overall audience and a 13 % rise in average viewing time—its largest viewership increase to date in Québec’s private French‑language market according to Numeris data. The network achieved strong demographic penetration among 18‑ to‑34‑year‑olds, a key target group for advertisers.

=== Noovo stations ===
Notes:

1) All Noovo owned-and-operated stations signed on with the network in 1986;

==== Owned-and-operated stations ====
City of licence	Station	Channel TV (RF)
Montreal	CFJP-DT	35.1 (35)
Quebec City	CFAP-DT	2.1 (39)
Saguenay	CFRS-DT	4.1 (38)
Sherbrooke	CFKS-DT	34.1 (16)
Trois-Rivières	CFKM-DT	34.1 (16)

==== Affiliated stations ====
City of licence	Station	Virtual channel	Digital RF channel	Year of affiliation	Owner
Gatineau/Ottawa	CFGS-DT	34.1	34	1986	RNC Media
Rimouski	CJPC-DT (satellite of CFTF-DT)	18	27	1987	Télé Inter-Rives
Rivière-du-Loup	CFTF-DT	29.1	29	1988	Télé Inter-Rives
Val-d'Or/Rouyn-Noranda	CFVS-DT	15.1	25	1987	RNC Media

== Identity and slogans ==
Beginning in 1997, TQS branded itself as le mouton noir de la télé (English: the black sheep of television), a slogan that could have served as the network's acknowledgment (or perhaps a badge of pride) that its history of financial difficulties, edgy programming, and limited availability outside Quebec had not always given it a prestigious place in the TV industry or in the eyes of the viewing public. The black sheep slogan was discontinued with the network's rebranding from TQS to V at the end of August 2009.

- 1987-1989: On grandit ensemble! (Growing together!)
- 1989-1995: TQS Au coeur de l'action! (TQS At the heart of the action!)
- 1990: Voyez comme c'est bon! (See how good it is!)
- 1995-1997: Allumée! (Turned on!) (Literally, "Lit up!")
- 1997-2007, 2008-2009: Le mouton noir de la télé (The black sheep of TV)
- 2007: Parce que vous êtes... différent! (Because you are... different!)
- 2009-2010: Laissez-vous divertir (Let yourself be entertained), to coincide with the rebranding to V on August 31, 2009.
- 2010: Le divertissement à la puissance V (Entertainment to the power of V)

== Revenue ==
Noovo has a 21% revenue share of the French-speaking private television market. The private francophone sector generates revenue of $361 million which equates to $75 million for Noovo.

== See also ==
- List of French-language Canadian television series
- Television in Quebec
- Culture of Quebec
