= Media in Saguenay, Quebec =

This is a list of media in Saguenay, Quebec.

== Radio ==
Frequency	Call sign	Branding	Format	Owner	Notes
FM 92.5	CKAJ-FM	CKAJ 92,5	community/oldies	La Radio communautaire du Saguenay	French
FM 93.7	CBJ-FM	Ici Radio-Canada Première	news/talk	Canadian Broadcasting Corporation	French
FM 94.5	CJAB-FM	Énergie	Mainstream Rock	Bell Media Radio	French
FM 95.7	CKYK-FM	95,7 KYK	Talk radio/Sports/Rock	Cogeco	French
FM 96.9	CFIX-FM	Rouge FM	soft adult contemporary	Bell Media Radio	French
FM 98.3	CILM-FM	Rythme FM	soft adult contemporary	Cogeco	French
FM 99.7	CKAJ-FM-1	CKAJ 92,5	community/oldies	La Radio communautaire du Saguenay	French, serves borough of La Baie; rebroadcasts CKAJ-FM
FM 100.9	CBJX-FM	Ici Musique	public music	Canadian Broadcasting Corporation	French
FM 102.7	CBJE-FM	CBC Radio One	news/talk	Canadian Broadcasting Corporation	English; rebroadcasts CBVE-FM, Quebec City
FM 105.5	CKGS-FM	Hit Country 105,5	Country music	Arsenal Media	French
FM 106.7	CION-FM-2	Radio Galilée	Christian radio	Fondation Radio-Galilée	French; rebroadcasts CION-FM, Quebec City

Internet radio stations

Frequency	Branding	Format	Owner	Notes
Internet only	Ici Musique Classique	Classical radio	Société Radio-Canada	Rebroadcasting from Montreal, Serving provincial wide. French
Internet only	Ici Musique Rock	Rock	Société Radio-Canada	Rebroadcasting from Montreal, Serving provincial wide. French
Internet only	Ici Musique Hip-Hop	Urban contemporary	Société Radio-Canada	Rebroadcasting from Montreal, Serving provincial wide. French
Internet only	Ici Musique atmosphère	Ambient music	Société Radio-Canada	Rebroadcasting from Montreal, Serving provincial wide. French
Internet only	Qub Radio	Talk radio	Quebecor Media	Rebroadcasting from Montreal, Serving provincial wide. French

== Television ==
Channel	PSIP	Cable channel	Call sign	Network	Notes
12	12.1	5	CKTV-DT	Ici Radio-Canada	
46	6.1	10	CJPM-DT	TVA	
8	8.1	11	CIVV-DT	Télé-Québec	Rebroadcasts CIVM-DT Montreal
38	4.1	7	CFRS-DT	Noovo	Rebroadcasts CFJP-DT Montreal

== Print ==
The city's main daily newspaper is Le Quotidien. Le Journal de Québec also publishes a special edition for the Saguenay–Lac-Saint-Jean region. Other newspapers now or formerly published in the city include Le Réveil, as well as student newspapers published at the city's colleges and at the Université du Québec à Chicoutimi.
