= CBF =

CBF may refer to:

== Aviation ==
- Council Bluffs Municipal Airport (IATA: CBF)
- China Northern Airlines (ICAO: CBF)

== Organisations ==
- Catholic Biblical Federation, a Roman Catholic Church organization for biblical translation and worldwide distribution
- Central British Fund for German Jewry, the original name of World Jewish Relief
- Chesapeake Bay Foundation, a conservation organization dedicated to the restoration and protection of the Chesapeake Bay and its tributary rivers
- Community Broadcasting Foundation, a funding organisation in Australia
- Cooperative Baptist Fellowship

== Radio stations in Canada ==
- CBF-FM, a French-language Canadian radio station in Montreal, Quebec
- CBF-4, a transmitter of CHLM-FM in Matagami, Quebec
- CBF-FM-8, a French-language Canadian radio station in Trois-Rivières, Quebec
- CBF-FM-10, a French-language Canadian radio station in Sherbrooke, Quebec

== Science and medicine ==
- Cerebral blood flow, the blood supply to the brain in a given period of time
- Ciliary beat frequency; see Cilium
- Core binding factor, a type of transcription factor
- C-Repeat Binding Factor, transcription factors in plants
- A counting Bloom filter, a probabilistic set data structure

== Sport and games ==
- Brazilian Football Confederation (Confederação Brasileira de Futebol), national governing body for football (soccer) in Brazil
- Cambodian Basketball Federation, the governing body for the Cambodia national basketball team
- Canadian Bridge Federation, the governing body for contract bridge in Canada
- ChessBase format, for storing chess games in handheld computer memory
- China Bandy Federation, the governing body for bandy in China
- College Baseball Foundation, Lubbock, Texas, U.S.
- Cyprus Basketball Federation, the governing body for basketball on the island of Cyprus
- Czech Basketball Federation (ČBF), the governing body of basketball in the Czech Republic

== Other uses ==
- Creeping Bellflower, a perennial plant native to central and southern Europe and west Asia, and highly invasive in parts of North America.
- Commander British Forces in Hong Kong (1843–1997), a senior British Army officer
- Honda CBF series, a series of motorcycles
- "C.B.F (Chrome Black Future)", a Nevermore song from the 1995 album Nevermore
