= CBC Montreal =

CBC Montreal may refer to:

- CBME-FM, CBC Radio One on 88.5 FM
- CBM-FM, CBC Music on 93.5 FM
- CBMT-DT, CBC Television on channel 6

== See also ==
- SRC Montréal (disambiguation)
- Maison Radio-Canada, the main CBC/Radio-Canada premises in Montreal
