= SRC Montréal =

SRC Montréal may refer to:

- CBF-FM, Ici Radio-Canada Première on 95.1 FM
- CBFX-FM, Ici Musique on 100.7 FM
- CBFT-DT, Ici Radio-Canada Télé on channel 2

== See also ==
- CBC Montreal (disambiguation)
- Maison Radio-Canada, the main CBC/Radio-Canada premises in Montreal
