= Caro Lamoureux =

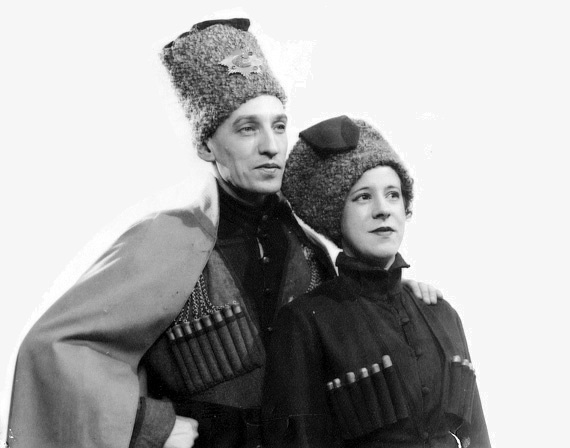
- Lamoureux (right) with Lionel Daunais (left) in 1937
- Born: Marie Julienne Antoinette Caroline Lamoureux; January 3, 1904; Montreal, Quebec, Canada
- Died: August 11, 1998 (aged 94); Montreal, Quebec, Canada
- Occupation: Soprano
- Years active: 1920–1946

Marie Julienne Antoinette Caroline Lamoureux (January 3, 1904 – August 11, 1998) was a Canadian soprano who debuted at age 16 in the operetta Les noces de Jeannette and worked in a semi-professional capacity for nine years in supporting roles in operettas done by French troupes in Quebec. Lamoureux performed with the Société canadienne d'opérette and the Les Variétés lyriques and sang numerous roles on CBC Radio. She gave up public singing and worked as a florist in Montreal with two shops.

== Early life ==
Lamoureux was born on January 3, 1904, in Montreal, and was a member of a French-Canadian family with connections to journalism and music centres; her mother was an American pianist from Chicago and her father played many instruments. She was taught voice by Céline Marier and Jeanne Maubourg and Albert Roberval taught her stage technique.

== Career ==
At 16, Lamoureux, a soprano, made her debut at the Salle Montcalm in the operetta Les noces de Jeannette. For nine years was a semi-professional, primarily singing supporting roles in operettas presented in Quebec by French troupes. She sung the title role of Alphonse Lavallée-Smith's operetta Gisèle when it premiered in 1924. Lamoureux made her Société canadienne d'opérette debut in Victor Massé's Les noces de Jeannette as a last-minute replacement for a colleague in 1929. She also sung Leila in Les pêcheurs de perles.

In 1930, Lamoureux sung the titular role in Mireille as well as Nedda in I Pagliacci, and performed five pieces in French and Italian at the Paul-Emile Corbeil concert in Windsor Hall that November. She sung Baucis in Charles Gounod's Philémon et Baucis and Gemma in the Canadian composer Joachim Ulric Voyer's L'Intendant Bigot in 1931. Lamoureux was selected by Société canadienne d'opérette to perform the part of the lead female role of Bettina in Edmond Audran's comic operetta La mascotte at His Majesty's Theatre in November 1932. In 1933, she sang Néméa in Adolphe Adam's Si j'étais roi put on by the Société canadienne d'opérette that April, and sung Under the Bridges of Paris on the NBC Radio Network. Lamoureux sung the title role of Emmerich Kálmán's Die Csárdásfürstin in June 1934, and Rosina in The Barber of Seville that same year. In November 1936, she was in the role of Ginette in the Les Variétés lyriques show, a company she worked with until 1946.

In 1937. Lamoureux was in the Radio-Canada programs Je voudrais tant savoir. and Babet et Cadet. She gave a recital of songs at the Tudor Hall in December 1937. Lamoureux and Reda Caire performed together in the operetta The Merry Widow at the Monument-National in March 1939, and repeated it in a series of performances in Nîmes, Salon-de-Provence and Sète in Southern France during a European tour before she had to leave France because of World War II. She performed in the operetta Ein Walzertraum at the Monument-National in November 1939. In March 1940, Lamoureux returned to the Les Variétés lyriques in its production of Robert Planquette's operetta Les cloches de Corneville as the role of Serpolette. She also sung in another production of Kálmán's Die Csárdásfürstin in November 1940. In 1941, Lamoureux sung the title role in the musical Naughty Marietta at the Monument-National, had a role in the Oscar Straus operetta The Chocolate Soldier, made her dramatic theatre debut as the coquette Germaine in André Picard's three-act play Kiki, was in a lead role in the Les Variétés lyriques's production of The New Moon, and was in the operetta Les noces de Jeannette at the Church of the Gesù that December.

She sung the part of the Russian actress Nadia in Bruno Granichstaedten's three-part opera L’Orloff at the Monument-National in 1942, as well as the role of Wanda in the opéra bouffe La Grande-Duchesse de Gérolstein that November. Lamoureux sung the part of Violetta in La traviata, and Philine in Mignon in 1943. She had the role of Kathie in The Student Prince in 1944, Katherine de Vaucelles in The Vagabond King in January 1945, and the titular role in the operetta Countess Maritza in early 1946. Between 1930 and 1943, Lamoureux sang many major roles on CBC Radio under the direction of various conductors, such as Jean-Marie Beaudet, and on the radio stations CHLP, CKAC and the public broadcaster Radio-Canada. She was selected the most popular classical singer in a competition organized by radio station CKAC in 1936.

Lamoureux later gave up public singing and became a florist in Montreal in the mid-1940s, becoming the owner of two shops. She continued to sing at a senior citizens' music hall troupe that she directed but returned to the stage in 1979. Lamoureux appeared on the CBF-FM program Les Musiciens pareux-mêmes in January 1991.

== Death ==
She died in Montreal on August 11, 1998.

== Legacy ==
She was given the sobriquet "Gipsy Princess" for "irresistible tendency to wear great, flashing ear-rings and costumes with more than a touch of gipsy audacity", and was called the Do-Do Girls alongside Rose Comete and Eleanor Hamel. The Bibliothèque et Archives nationales du Québec holds the Caro Lamoureux Collection that it acquired from Lamoureux's estate.
