= CKTV-DT =

Television station in Saguenay, Quebec

Saguenay, Quebec; Canada
- Channels: Digital: 12 (VHF); Virtual: 12
- Branding: ICI Saguenay–Lac-Saint-Jean

Programming
- Affiliations: Ici Radio-Canada Télé

Ownership
- Owner: Société Radio-Canada

History
- First air date: December 1, 1955
- Former call signs: CKRS-TV (1955–1999)
- Former channel numbers: Analogue: 12 (VHF, 1955–2011)

Technical information
- Licensing authority: CRTC
- ERP: 7.4 kW
- HAAT: 581.1 m (1,906 ft)
- Transmitter coordinates: 48°36′7″N 70°49′48″W

Links
- Website: ICI Saguenay–Lac-Saint-Jean

CKTV-DT (channel 12), branded ICI Saguenay–Lac-Saint-Jean, is an Ici Radio-Canada Télé station in Saguenay, Quebec, Canada, serving the Saguenay–Lac-Saint-Jean region. The station is owned by the Canadian Broadcasting Corporation (known in French as Société Radio-Canada). CKTV-DT's studios are located on Rue des Saguenéens in the former city of Chicoutimi adjacent to the Place du Royaume shopping centre, and its transmitter is located atop Mount Valin.

== History ==
The station first aired on December 1, 1955, as CKRS-TV. It was originally owned by Radio Saguenay along with CKRS radio. It joined Radio-Canada's microwave network on October 28, 1957.

Radio Saguenay sold off its radio station in 1981, but kept CKRS-TV until selling it to Cogeco on November 24, 1998. Cogeco adopted the current callsign the following year, on March 26, 1999. Shortly thereafter, Cogeco acquired control of TQS, to which Cogeco contributed its existing local stations. Radio-Canada took editorial control of the station's news programming in 2002.

In September 2007, Radio-Canada announced that it would not renew its affiliation agreement with its three Cogeco-owned affiliates—CKTV, CKTM in Trois-Rivières and CKSH in Sherbrooke—after their then-current agreement expired in August 2008. An application to directly acquire the stations was filed by Radio-Canada on April 25, 2008, concurrently with Cogeco's proposed sale of TQS to Remstar. The transaction was approved by the CRTC on June 26, 2008.

Prior to the 2002 municipal amalgamations, the station's city of license was Jonquière, which is now a borough of Saguenay. Prior to 2010, the station's studios were based there alongside former sister station CFRS-TV, while its transmitter has been retained atop Mount Valin.

Soon after Radio-Canada bought the station, the network announced its plans to increase local programming and to move CKTV to an integrated production centre in the new Chicoutimi studios adjacent to the Place du Royaume shopping centre, alongside its radio sisters, CBJ-FM and CBJX-FM.

CKTV was previously rebroadcast on CKTV-TV-1 (channel 27) in St-Fulgence; however, this translator ceased operations by November 2011.

== Other uses ==
During the 1980s, CKTV was also a brand name used by CTV affiliate CKCK-TV in Regina, Saskatchewan.

CKTV was also originally assigned as the call sign for a station in Victoria, British Columbia, which changed its call sign to CHEK-TV before it signed on in 1956.
