= Ici Radio-Canada Première =

Canadian French-language news and talk radio network, operated by the CBC

- Type: Radio network
- Country: Canada
- Headquarters: Quebec City; Montreal

Ownership
- Owner: Canadian Broadcasting Corporation

History
- Launch date: 1937; 89 years ago
- Former names: Radio de Radio-Canada (1937–1997); Première Chaîne (1997–2013)

Coverage
- Availability: AM/FM: Canada, SiriusXM: Canada/United States

Links
- Website: Ici Radio-Canada Première

Ici Radio-Canada Première (formerly Première Chaîne) is a Canadian French-language radio network, the news and information service of the Canadian Broadcasting Corporation (known as Société Radio-Canada in French), the public broadcaster of Canada. It is the French counterpart of CBC Radio One, the CBC's similar English-language radio network.

The service is available across Canada, although not as widely as CBC Radio One. Only the provinces of Quebec and Ontario are served by more than one Première originating station. In all other provinces, the whole province is served by a single station with multiple transmitters. It reaches 90 percent of all Canadian francophones.

Each originating station outside Montreal airs a national schedule, taken from flagship station CBF-FM, complete with opted-out local/regional shows at peak times, depending on each market. News bulletins are aired live, irrespective of location.

The network may broadcast on either the AM or FM bands, depending on the market. A national version is available across North America on SiriusXM Canada channel 170. Première was available in Europe, North Africa and the Middle East live via the Hot Bird satellite. The satellite service closed in June 2012 as part of the budget measures affecting Radio Canada International.

== History ==
Logo as Première Chaîne, used until August 2013.

ICI Première logo used until 2016.

Some French-language programming had aired on the Canadian Radio Broadcasting Commission's CRCM since 1933, but the CBC's French radio network traces its formal beginning to December 11, 1937, with the launch of CBF in Montreal.

In 1938, the station was expanded into a fledgling network with the launch of CBV in Quebec City and CBJ in Chicoutimi. Also that year, the long-running soap opera La Pension Velder, which ran until 1942 and was then revived in the 1950s as a television series, aired for the first time. The following year, the even more successful and influential Un Homme et son péché was launched.

For the first month of World War II, Radio-Canada aired 24 hours a day, broadcasting war news from Europe. Also that year, the network broadcast its first Montreal Canadiens hockey game.

In 1940, another popular radio soap, Jeunesse dorée, made its debut. In 1941, the network, which had previously relied on Canadian Press reporters, launched its own news division and two shortwave radio stations in Montreal to serve francophones outside Quebec. Throughout the 1940s, its expansion inside Quebec was primarily through private affiliate stations.

In 1942, the network controversially refused to give airtime to the "No" side in the Conscription Plebiscite. Nonetheless, 72.9 per cent of Quebec voters were opposed.

In 1945, the International Service was launched. In 1946, the network launched an experimental FM station in Montreal (which would become CBFX), and expanded outside Quebec for the first time with the launch of CKSB as a private affiliate in St. Boniface, Manitoba, near Winnipeg.

The network also had seven privately owned affiliates:

- CHGB, Sainte-Anne-de-la-Pocatière, 250 watts
- CHLT, Sherbrooke, 1,000 watts
- CHNC, New Carlisle, 1,000 watts
- CJBR, Rimouski, 1,000 watts (purchased by Radio-Canada in 1977)
- CJFP, Rivière-du-Loup, 250 watts
- CKRN, Rouyn, 250 watts
- CKCH, Hull, 250 watts
- CKCV, Quebec City, 1,000 watts

In 1948, the influential children's series Tante Lucille and Gérard Pelletier's public affairs program Les Idées en marche debuted. Also that year, three studios in Montreal's King's Hall building were destroyed in an explosion, leading Radio-Canada to centralize its operations in a new building on boulevard Dorchester.

In 1952, the network became autonomous from the CBC head office in Toronto. Previously, all programming decisions had to be reviewed by the Toronto staff in advance.

Through the 1960s, the network began to expand across Canada, taking over Toronto's CJBC in October 1964, and launching Ottawa's CBOF in 1964 and Vancouver's CBUF in 1967. As well, influential broadcaster Lise Payette launched her first program, Place aux femmes, in 1965.

The network eliminated tobacco advertising in 1969, and eventually dropped all commercial advertising in 1974, except for Montreal Canadiens hockey games (which would move to the Radiomédia network in 1997). The Maison Radio-Canada, which remains the flagship facility for all of Radio-Canada's broadcast services, was officially opened by Pierre Trudeau in 1973, and Radio-Canada's FM network was launched in 1974. Through the remainder of the 1970s, the network began to directly acquire many of its private affiliate stations, including CHFA in Edmonton, CFRG in Gravelbourg and CFNS in Saskatoon, although with the CBC's financial difficulties in the 1980s, this process was slowed down considerably.

The network was rebranded as Première Chaîne in 1997, concurrently with the rebranding of all of the CBC's radio networks.

In 1999, Radio-Canada applied to the CRTC for a license to launch a third all-news station in Montreal, on the 690 AM frequency CBF had surrendered in 1997 when it moved to FM. The application was rejected. Radio-Canada filed an appeal of the decision with the Federal Court of Appeal, which denied the request in October of that year.

In 2002, two of the network's last three remaining private affiliate stations, CKVM in Ville-Marie and CFLM in La Tuque, disaffiliated from the network, and the final private affiliate, CHLM in Rouyn-Noranda, was directly acquired by the network in 2004. The network now directly owns all of the stations that broadcast its programming.

On June 5, 2013, it was announced that Première Chaîne would be re-branded as Ici Première on August 9, 2013 as part of a wider re-branding of the CBC's French-language outlets. This was a nod to the network's system cue since the 1930s, Ici Radio-Canada ("This is Radio-Canada"). Following highly publicized complaints about the new "Ici" name, prompted primarily by the removal of the historic "Radio-Canada" brand, the new name was changed to Ici Radio-Canada Première instead.

== Programming ==
=== News ===
Première's flagship 60-minute news program is Ça nous regarde, a national news and discussion program similar to CBC Radio One's The World at Six and As It Happens.

=== Regional differences ===
There are various regional adjustments to the national schedule. In the Atlantic provinces the national schedule airs live, with programme trailers announcing the broadcast time as one hour later.

All Première outlets produce a regional program in the morning (Monday to Friday) from their respective studios. For afternoon programs, in some provinces or regions, a program may originate from a studio in the largest station in their area and broadcast to all stations in a given region; for example: stations in Prince Edward Island, Nova Scotia and St. John's broadcasts the program produced in Moncton and CBEF Windsor broadcast the show produced in Toronto at CJBC.

In the summer, the morning show for the Prince Edward Island, Nova Scotia and Newfoundland are produced in turn by the stations of Halifax and of Charlottetown and the afternoon program of the Rimouski, Matane and Sept-Îles stations is produced alternately in each of the stations and broadcast on these three stations.

For Saturday morning shows, they are produced respectively in Moncton (for the Maritimes), Montreal (for the province of Quebec, except the Outaouais region), Ottawa (for Eastern Ontario and the Outaouais region), Sudbury (for Ontario, except Ottawa and Kenora), and Vancouver (for the Western provinces, as well as Kenora, Ontario).

In Northern Canada, CFWY-FM in Whitehorse, Yukon rebroadcasts the programs of CBUF-FM Vancouver. This station is not owned by the CBC, but by the Franco-Yukon Association. Conversely, Ici Nord Québec, anchored by CBFG-FM Chisasibi and transmitted to nine other First Nations communities in the Nord-du-Québec region via FM repeater transmitters, airs the same schedule as CBF-FM, but with four hours of regional programming inserted on weekdays, three of these in the Cree language.

The feed for SiriusXM Canada airs live across North America and simulcasted from CBF-FM in Montreal, meaning programmes are broadcast using the Eastern Time Zone. The entire schedule is aired as of 2016.

Listeners in Europe, Middle East and North Africa were able to receive direct programming from CBF-FM Montreal, with RCI's own shows inserted into the schedule in the morning and evening. This ceased in June 2012.

=== Holiday programming ===
During certain holidays, a single program may be heard on a provincewide or a regionwide basis. In Quebec, stations outside Montreal, Quebec City and Outaouais airs a morning program and an afternoon show produced by different outlets in turn. In Ontario, holiday editions of morning shows are produced at CJBC, CBON or CBEF, and is broadcast on all three stations. In most holidays, the afternoon show is produced at the station that had not produced the morning show of that day. And all Première outlets in Western Canada present special pan-regional programming on holidays replacing local programs - Les matins de l'Ouest and Le retour de l'Ouest.

On Christmas Day and New Year's Day, all stations nationwide carry the same schedule from Montreal, live or taped, depending on location. Also, on the weeks of Christmas and New Year's, regional morning shows begin at 6:00 in all areas, except Montreal where it could begins at 5:00 or 6:00 one year and another.

== Stations ==
In addition to primary production centres listed here, most stations in the network also serve a larger region through rebroadcasters. Due to the significant number of such rebroadcast frequencies, those are listed in each individual station's article rather than here.

Frequency	Call sign	Coordinates	Location	Region served	Morning program	Afternoon program	Saturday program
FM 97.7	CBUF-FM	49.3531°N 122.956°W	Vancouver	British Columbia, Yukon, Western Whatcom County, Washington	Phare ouest	Boulevard du Pacifique	Culture et confiture
FM 90.1	CHFA-FM	53.5133°N 113.285°W	Edmonton	Alberta	Le café Show	La croisée	Culture et confiture
FM 97.7	CBKF-FM	50.4828°N 104.506°W	Regina	Saskatchewan	Point du jour	Pour faire un monde	Culture et confiture
FM 88.1	CKSB-10-FM	49.7708°N 97.5103°W	Winnipeg	Manitoba; Kenora and Rainy River Districts, Ontario	Le 6 à 9	L'actuel	Culture et confiture
AM 1550	CBEF	42.2156°N 82.9208°W	Windsor	Southwestern Ontario, Southeast Michigan and The Thumb	Matins sans frontières	L'heure de pointe - Toronto	Enfin samedi
AM 860	CJBC	43.5750°N 79.8172°W	Toronto	Greater Toronto Area, Central Ontario, Western New York, Northwestern Pennsylvania	Y'a pas deux matins pareils	L'heure de pointe - Toronto	Enfin samedi
FM 98.1	CBON-FM	46.5039°N 80.9675°W	Sudbury	Northern Ontario (except Kenora and Rainy River Districts)	Le matin du Nord	Jonction 11-17	Enfin samedi
FM 90.7	CBOF-FM	45.5031°N 75.8503°W	Ottawa	Eastern Ontario; Outaouais; Saint Lawrence River Valley (ON/NY); Akwesasne	Les matins d'ici	Sur le vif	Les malins
FM 103.5	CBFG-FM	53.7786°N 78.8900°W	Chisasibi	Nord-du-Québec (in ten First Nations communities)	ᐗᓂᔥᑳᒄ (Winschgaoug)	ᐋᔔᒦᔨ (Âshûmîyi)	Samedi et rien d'autre
FM 90.7	CHLM-FM	48.2653°N 79.0433°W	Rouyn-Noranda	Abitibi-Témiscamingue	Des matins en or	Région zéro 8	Samedi et rien d'autre
FM 95.1	CBF-FM	45.5056°N 73.5917°W	Montreal	Greater Montreal Area, Nord-du-Québec (select communities), Upper Lake Champlain area	Tout un matin	Le 15-18	Samedi et rien d'autre
FM 101.1	CBF-FM-10	45.3967°N 71.8311°W	Sherbrooke	Estrie; Northeast Kingdom; Coös County, NH	Par ici l'info	Vivement le retour	Samedi et rien d'autre
FM 96.5	CBF-FM-8	46.5028°N 72.6369°W	Trois-Rivières	Mauricie;Centre-du-Québec	Facteur matinal	En direct	Samedi et rien d'autre
FM 106.3	CBV-FM	46.8228°N 71.4953°W	Quebec City	Capitale-Nationale, Chaudière-Appalaches	Première heure	C'est encore mieux l'après-midi	Samedi et rien d'autre
FM 93.7	CBJ-FM	48.4247°N 71.1083°W	Saguenay	Saguenay–Lac-Saint-Jean	C'est jamais pareil	Style libre	Samedi et rien d'autre
FM 89.1	CJBR-FM	48.3278°N 68.8353°W	Rimouski	Bas-Saint-Laurent	Info-Réveil	Même fréquence	Samedi et rien d'autre
FM 102.1	CBGA-FM	48.8333°N 67.3608°W	Matane	Gaspésie–Îles-de-la-Madeleine	Bon pied, bonne heure	Au coeur du monde	Samedi et rien d'autre
FM 98.1	CBSI-FM	50.1489°N 66.4692°W	Sept-Îles	Côte-Nord and Labrador	Bonjour la côte	Boréale 138	Samedi et rien d'autre
FM 88.5	CBAF-FM	46.1439°N 64.9022°W	Moncton	New Brunswick; Aroostook County, Maine	La matinale	L'heure de pointe - Acadie	Michel le samedi
FM 88.1	CBAF-FM-15	46.2122°N 63.3414°W	Charlottetown	Prince Edward Island	Le réveil - Île du Prince-Édouard	L'heure de pointe - Acadie	Michel le samedi
FM 92.3	CBAF-FM-5	44.6508°N 63.6569°W	Halifax	Nova Scotia and Newfoundland	Le réveil - Nouvelle-Écosse/Terre-Neuve	L'heure de pointe - Acadie	Michel le samedi
Sirius XM 170	Première		Montreal	North America (same programs as CBF-FM)			

Historically, Première has broadcast primarily on the AM band, but many stations have moved over to FM. Over the years, a number of CBC radio transmitters with a majority of them on AM have either moved to FM or had shut down completely. See: List of defunct CBC radio transmitters in Canada
