= Lucille Desparois =

Canadian author and radio personality

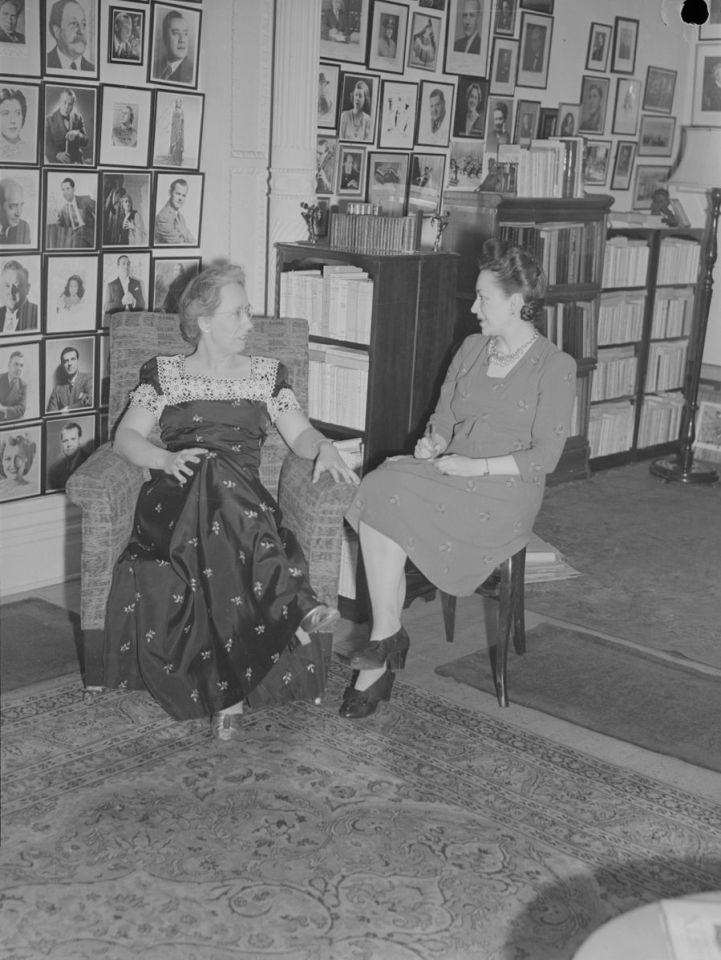
Lucille Desparois (right) at the home of Marie-Thérèse Paquin in Montreal.

Lucille Desparois-Danis (pseudonym, Tante Lucille; 15 March 1909, Châteauguay, Québec - 21 October 1996, Laval, Quebec) was a Canadian author and radio personality of Québec radio. In 1944, she began as a storyteller using the pseudonym of "Tante Lucille". On May 8, 1948, Desparois began her Saturday morning program, Tante Lucille, on Radio-Canada, in Montreal. This program for children was broadcast for 27 years, until May 31, 1974.

== Biography ==
Lucille Desparois was born on March 15, 1909, and baptized the following day, March 16, 1909, at the church of Saint-Joachim, Chateauguay. After graduating from Académie Bourget and the Lassalle Conservatory, Desparois became Secretary to the Government of Quebec, for a program broadcast at CKAC, L'Heure provinciale. In 1939, she made a series of radio broadcasts at the CHLP post, which also led her to write texts for CBF and CKVL. At that time, she became known for her many articles in newspapers and magazines. Desparois is best known for her storytelling art for children. In 1944, the Librairie Granger & Frères published its first collection of her children's stories. During her long career, Desparois published numerous books and recorded a dozen story-telling records. Beginning in 1954, the Dutch publishing house Mulder & Zoon published translations of the tales of Tante Lucille in nine languages.

Parallel to her career as a writer and journalist, Desparois traveled a lot. She also gave lectures in Quebec, in the rest of Canada and abroad, through libraries and schools. In all, Desparois published eight collections of stories, which were translated into several languages and sold around the world to more than one million copies. Several discs have also been on the market.

The archives of Desparois are preserved in the Montréal archives center of the Bibliothèque et Archives nationales du Québec.
