= Mount Valin =

Mountain in Quebec, Canada

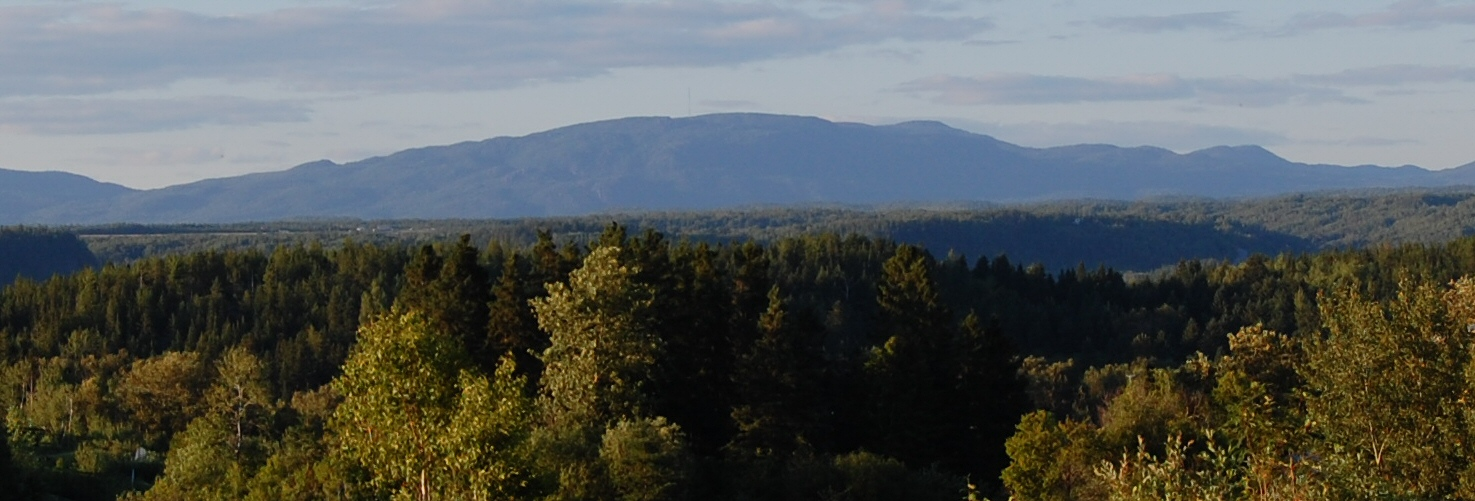
- Mount Valin viewed from Saguenay

Highest point
- Elevation: 980 m (3,220 ft)
- Coordinates: 48°36′47″N 70°47′48″W

Geography
- Location: Mont-Valin, Le Fjord-du-Saguenay Regional County Municipality, Quebec (Canada)
- Parent range: Laurentian Highlands
- Topo map: NTS 22D10 Lac Jalobert

Mount Valin is the highest mountain of the Saguenay–Lac-Saint-Jean region (as measured from sea level) in the Canadian province of Quebec. Situated 30 kilometres (19 mi) from Chicoutimi, the mountain receives an average of 1,200 mm (47 in) of rain and 600 cm (236 in) of snow every year.

Mount Valin is an important site used for transmission facilities for radio and television stations in the region. Stations broadcasting from Mount Valin are television stations CFRS-DT, CKTV-DT and CIVV-DT; and radio stations CFIX-FM, CJAB-FM and CION-FM-2.

Mount Valin is part of the Monts-Valin National Park and home to the Le Valinouët ski centre.
