= CBFG-FM =

Ici Radio-Canada Première station in Quebec

- Chisasibi, Quebec; Canada
- Broadcast area: First Nations communities in Nord-du-Québec
- Frequency: 103.5 MHz
- Branding: Ici Nord-Québec

Programming
- Format: News/Talk
- Network: Ici Radio-Canada Première

Ownership
- Owner: Canadian Broadcasting Corporation

History
- Call sign meaning: Canadian Broadcasting Corporation French G

Technical information
- Class: A1
- ERP: 85 watts

Links
- Website: Ici Radio-Canada Première; Ici Nord-Québec

CBFG-FM is a mainly-French-language Canadian radio station located in Chisasibi, Quebec.

It is owned and operated by the Canadian Broadcasting Corporation (French: Société Radio-Canada), which is owned by the Government of Canada. It broadcasts on 103.5 MHz with an average effective radiated power of 85 watts (class A1).

The station has an ad-free news/talk format and is the flagship of the regional Ici Nord-Québec network, which carries programming from the Canada-wide Ici Radio-Canada Première network, and some regional programming. Like all Première stations, but unlike most FM stations, it broadcasts in mono. The network serves ten First Nations communities in Nord-du-Québec and adjacent regions.

== Programming ==
During most of its programming day, CBFG-FM largely rebroadcasts Radio-Canada flagship CBF-FM in Montreal, including morning program Gravel le matin, afternoon show Le 15-18, and Saturday morning program Samedi et rien d'autre. Until July 2020 the station used to carry Cree language programs, reduced from 80 to 15 hours per week in 2015 and now to be found on English CBC sister station CBMP-FM.

== Transmitters ==
At least seven of these transmitters used to be repeaters of CBF-FM: CBFA-FM-1 Manawan, CBFA-FM-2 Obedjiwan, CBFW-FM Wemindji, CBFM-FM Mistissini, CBFA-3 (later re-called CBFG-FM-3) Wemotaci, CBFH-FM Waskaganish, and CBFV-FM Waswanipi; these repeaters changed their source of programming from CBF-FM to CBFG-FM following approval by the CRTC on October 30, 2012. It is unknown if CBFG-FM was a repeater of CBF-FM.

On July 15, 2015, the CRTC renewed CBFG's licence until August 31, 2018.

On August 2, 2018, the CRTC approved the transfer of transmitters CBFA-FM-1 Manouane, CBFA-FM-2 Obedjiwan and CBFG-FM-3 Weymontachie, Québec from license CBFG-FM Chisasibi, Québec to station CBF-FM-8 Trois-Rivières, Québec. (CRTC Administrative Decision 2018–0525–1, August 2, 2018)

Rebroadcasters of CBFG-FM
| City of licence | Identifier | Frequency | Power | Class | RECNet | CRTC Decision | Notes |
|---|---|---|---|---|---|---|---|
| Kuujjuaq | CBFG-FM-1 | 105.1 FM | 50 watts | LP | Query | | 58°6′32.04″N 68°24′39.96″W |
| Kuujjuarapik | CBFG-FM-2 | 105.1 FM | 50 watts | LP | Query | | 55°16′46.92″N 77°45′3.96″W |
| Wemindji | CBFW-FM | 103.5 FM | 55 watts | A1 | Query | | 53°0′11.16″N 78°48′56.16″W |
| Mistissini | CBFM-FM | 100.7 FM | 77 watts | A1 | Query | | 50°25′0.84″N 73°52′22.08″W |
| Waskaganish | CBFH-FM | 103.5 FM | 55 watts | A1 | Query | | 51°29′12.12″N 78°44′44.88″W |
| Waswanipi | CBFV-FM | 101.5 FM | 90 watts | A1 | Query | | 49°41′40.92″N 75°58′6.96″W |

== See also ==
- CBC North
