= CBFT-DT =

Television station in Montreal

- Montreal, Quebec; Canada
- Channels: Digital: 19 (UHF); Virtual: 2
- Branding: ICI Grand Montréal

Programming
- Affiliations: 2.1: Ici Radio-Canada Télé

Ownership
- Owner: Société Radio-Canada
- Sister stations: CBMT-DT, CBME-FM, CBM-FM, CBF-FM, CBFX-FM

History
- First air date: September 6, 1952
- Former call signs: CBFT (1952–2011)
- Former channel number: Analog: 2 (VHF) (1952–2011)
- Former affiliations: CBC (secondary, 1952–1954)
- Call sign meaning: Canadian Broadcasting Corporation Français Télévision

Technical information
- Licensing authority: CRTC
- ERP: 25 kW
- HAAT: 300 m (984 ft)
- Transmitter coordinates: 45°30′19″N 73°35′29″W

Links
- Webcast: ICI Télé
- Website: ICI Grand Montréal

CBFT-DT (channel 2) is a television station in Montreal, Quebec, Canada, serving as the flagship station of the French-language service of Ici Radio-Canada Télé. It is owned and operated by the Canadian Broadcasting Corporation (known in French as Société Radio-Canada) alongside CBC Television outlet CBMT-DT (channel 6). The two stations share studios at Maison Radio-Canada on René Lévesque Boulevard East in Downtown Montreal; CBFT-DT's transmitter is located atop Mount Royal.

== History ==
CBFT was the first permanent television station in Canada (an experimental station, VE9EC, had been on the air in Montreal from 1931 to 1935). It launched on September 6, 1952, at 4 p.m., beating CBLT in Toronto by two days. The station went on the air with the movie Aladdin and His Lamp, followed by a cartoon, and then a French film, a news segment and a bilingual variety show. The station aired programming in both French (60 percent) and English (40 percent), a practice common for many stations in Quebec at the time.

This continued until January 10, 1954, when CBMT was launched on VHF channel 6. At that time, all English programming moved to CBMT, while CBFT became a purely French-language station as the flagship of the Télévision de Radio-Canada network for francophone viewers. CBMT's sign-on was hastened by the planned launch of television stations across the border in Burlington, Vermont, and Plattsburgh, New York.

Prior to the digital transition, CBFT operated a translator network that stretched across most of Quebec, parts of Ontario, and most of northern Canada (Northwest Territories and Nunavut).

In recent years, Radio-Canada's network feed has largely become a retransmission of CBFT. Due to a lack of sources for alternative programming, most Radio-Canada stations' schedules are largely identical to those of CBFT, other than commercials and regional news. This was the case for privately owned Radio-Canada affiliates before the last such station closed in 2021.

== Technical information ==
=== Subchannel ===
Subchannel of CBFT-DT
Channel	Res.	Short name	Programming
2.1	720p	CBFT-DT	Ici Radio-Canada Télé

=== Analog-to-digital conversion ===
CBFT began broadcasting its digital signal on March 22, 2005. On August 31, 2011, when Canadian television stations in CRTC-designated mandatory markets transitioned from analog to digital broadcasts, the station's digital signal remained on UHF channel 19, using virtual channel 2.

== Former rebroadcasters ==
CBFT had over 30 analog television rebroadcasters throughout rural Quebec and Labrador. Due to federal funding reductions to the CBC, in April 2012, the CBC responded with substantial budget cuts, which included shutting down CBC's and Radio-Canada's remaining analog transmitters on July 31, 2012. None of CBC or Radio-Canada's rebroadcasters were converted to digital.

=== Quebec ===
City of licence	Call sign	Channel	ERP (W)	Notes
Aguanish	CBST-7	8 (VHF)	326	
Baie-Comeau	CBST-19	7 (VHF)	1,590	
Baie-Johan-Beetz	CBST-8	7 (VHF)	1	
Bearn/Fabre	CKRN-TV-3	3 (VHF)		
Beauceville	CBVT-6	6 (VHF)	4	
Blanc-Sablon	CBST-17	3 (VHF)	150	
Cap-Chat	CBGAT-6	2 (VHF)	39	
Carleton	CBGAT-14	2 (VHF)	3,200	
Causapscal	CBGAT-5	9 (VHF)	11	
Chandler	CBGAT-15	8 (VHF)	184	
Chapais	CBFAT-1	12 (VHF)	5	
Chibougamau	CBFAT	5 (VHF)	665	
Chisasibi	CBFGT	9 (VHF)	10	
Clermont	CBSAT	21 (VHF)	10	
Cloridorme	CBGAT-16	8 (VHF)	85	
Fermont	CBFT-13	7 (VHF)	20	Formerly CBST-5
Gaspe	CBGAT-17	9 (VHF)	1,800	
Gethsémani/La Romaine	CBST-9	9 (VHF)	10	
Grande-Vallee, Quebec	CBGAT-3	6 (VHF)	587	
Cros-Morne	CBGAT-9	4 (VHF)	5	
Harrington-Harbour	CBST-11	8 (VHF)	129	
Havre-Saint-Pierre	CBST-1	12 (VHF)	16	
Ile du Havre Aubert	CBIMT-1	16 (UHF)	55	
Îles-de-la-Madeleine	CBIMT	12 (VHF)	2,800	
Inukjuak	CBFI-TV	9 (VHF)		
Kuujjuaq	CBFQ-TV	9 (VHF)		
Kuujjuarapik	CBFK-TV	9 (VHF)		
La Tabatière	CBST-13	4 (VHF)	78	
La Tuque	CBFT-14	3 (VHF)	15,400	Formerly CBVT-3
Lac-Etchemin	CBVT-4	55 (UHF)	400	
Lac-Humqui	CBGAT-19	24 (UHF)	100	
Lac-Megantic	CBVT-3	12 (VHF)	10	
L'Anse-a-Valleau	CBGAT-18	10 (VHF)	10	
Les Mechins	CBGAT-23	10 (VHF)		
Longue-Pointe-De-Min	CBST-18	6 (VHF)	98	
Manouane	CBFT-5	5 (VHF)	10	
Marsoui	CBGAT-8	12 (VHF)	10	
Matane	CBGAT	6 (VHF)	3,700	
Mistassini	CBFMT	9 (VHF)	10	
Mont-Climont	CBGAT-1	13 (VHF)	709	
Mont-Laurier	CBFT-2	3 (VHF)	13,700	
Mont-Louis	CBGAT-4	2 (VHF)	62	
Mont-Louis-en-Haut	CBGAT-10	19 (UHF)	5,100	
Mont-St-Michel	CBFT-9	16 (UHF)	3,000	
Mont-Tremblant	CBFT-1	11 (VHF)	1,600	
Murdochville	CBGAT-2	10 (VHF)	1,530	
Notre-Dame-Des-Monts	CBSNT	40 (UHF)	100	
Obedjiwan	CBFT-6	10 (VHF)	1	
Old Fort Bay	CBST-15	7 (VHF)	5	
Parent	CBFT-4	12 (VHF)	10	
Percé	CBGAT-28	11 (VHF)	20	
Port Daniel	CBGAT-21	7 (VHF)	170	
Povungnituk	CBFP-TV	9 (VHF)	10	
Radisson	CBFRT	8 (VHF)	180	
Riviere-A-Claude	CBGAT-13	4 (VHF)	10	
Riviere-Au-Renard	CBGAT-22	2 (VHF)	2,900	
Riviere-au-Tonnerre	CBST-6	7 (VHF)	1,600	
Riviere-St-Paul	CBST-16	21 (UHF)	89	
Salluit	CBFS-TV	9 (VHF)	10	
Schefferville	CBFT-8	9 (VHF)	89	
Sept-Îles	CBST	13 (VHF)	8,400	
St-Augustin	CBST-14	2 (VHF)		
Ste-Anne-des-Monts	CBGAT-11	8 (VHF)	45,000	
St-Fabien-de-Panet	CBVT-5	13 (VHF)		
St-Marc De Latour	CJBR-TV-1	9 (VHF)		
St-Michel-des-Saints	CBFT-3	7 (VHF)		
Stoneham	CBVT-8	44 (UHF)	5	
St-Pamphile	CBSPT	3 (VHF)		
St-Rene-de-Matane	CBGAT-7	30 (UHF)		
Témiscaming	CBFST-2	12 (VHF)	7,000	
Tête-à-la-Baleine	CBST-12	6 (VHF)	5	
Tewkesbury	CBVT-7	7 (VHF)	5	
Thetford Mines	CBVT-9	21 (UHF)	5	
Ville-Marie	CKRN-TV-2	6 (VHF)	5	
Waskaganish	CBFHT	9 (VHF)		
Waswanipi	CBFV-TV	10 (VHF)	5	
Wemindji	CBFWT	9 (VHF)		
Weymont	CBFT-7	6 (VHF)		

=== Newfoundland and Labrador ===
City of licence	Call sign	Channel	ERP (W)	Notes
Churchill Falls	CBFT-11	13 (VHF)	5	Formerly CBST-4
Labrador City	CBFT-12	11 (VHF)		Formerly CBST-3
Port Au Port	CBFNT	13 (VHF)	14,000	
Port Au Port	CBFNT-1	4 (VHF)	291	

== See also ==
- List of Ici Radio-Canada Télé stations
