= CBFX-FM =

Ici Musique station in Montreal, Canada

- Montreal, Quebec; Canada
- Broadcast area: Greater Montreal
- Frequency: 100.7 MHz

Programming
- Format: Public music
- Network: Ici Musique

Ownership
- Owner: Canadian Broadcasting Corporation
- Sister stations: CBF-FM, CBM-FM, CBME-FM, CBFT-DT, CBMT-DT

History
- First air date: March 5, 1948 (experimental as VE9CB 1946-1948)
- Former call signs: CBF-FM (1948–1998)
- Former frequencies: 95.1 MHz (1948–1971)
- Call sign meaning: Canadian Broadcasting Corporation French X

Technical information
- Class: C1
- ERP: 100,000 watts
- HAAT: 242.5 metres (796 ft)

Links
- Website: ICI Musique

CBFX-FM (100.7 MHz) is a public non-commercial radio station in Montreal, Quebec. It is the flagship station of the Ici Musique Network and broadcasts in French.

Owned and operated by the government-owned Canadian Broadcasting Corporation (French: Société Radio-Canada), CBFX-FM is a Class C1 station. It transmits from the Mount Royal candelabra tower with an effective radiated power of 100,000 watts. Its studios and offices, along with those of Ici Radio-Canada Première sister station CBF-FM, are located at Maison Radio-Canada on René Lévesque Boulevard.

== History ==
On March 13, 1946, the station began experimental broadcasts as VE9CB on 98.1 MHz. It received a full license on March 5, 1948, as CBF-FM, broadcasting at 95.1 MHz. For most of its early years, it simulcast co-owned CBF. Occasionally, in the 1960s and 70s, it would break away from its AM counterpart to air special programming.

With the CBC's English-language FM network already established since the 1960s, plans were made to create a French-language FM network, with CBF-FM as its originating station. In 1971, in preparation for its role as the French FM flagship, CBF-FM swapped frequencies with CBM-FM. CBF-FM moved to 100.7, just vacated by CBM-FM, while that station moved to a new frequency, 93.5 MHz. The move not only allowed CBF-FM to boost its signal to a full 100,000 watts, but it also began to broadcast in stereo for the first time.

In 1972, La Chaîne Culturelle (The Cultural Network) was launched on four CBC-owned FM stations, CBF-FM in Montreal, CBOF-FM in Ottawa, CBV-FM in Quebec City, and CBJ-FM in Chicoutimi. The network aired mostly classical music with some jazz and other arts programming.

In 1998, CBF-FM changed its call sign. Its AM sister station, CBF, moved to the FM band and picked up the CBF-FM call letters. That required the former CBF-FM to switch to a new call sign, CBFX-FM.

In 2004, the network was renamed Espace Musique. And in 2014, it became Ici Musique, still with 100.7 CBFX-FM as its originating station.

== Transmitters ==
Rebroadcasters of CBFX-FM
City of licence	Identifier	Frequency	Power	Class	RECNet	CRTC Decision	Notes
Val-d'Or/Amos^{2}	CBFX-FM-3	88.3 FM	32,400 watts	B	Query	99-511	48°12′1.08″N 78°7′14.88″W
Gaspé	CBFX-FM-5	90.1 FM	4,110 watts	B	Query	2000-67	48°50′0.96″N 64°15′24.12″W
Mont-Laurier	CBFX-FM-6	91.1 FM	72,000 watts	C1	Query	2002-124	46°33′34.92″N 75°42′16.92″W
Rouyn-Noranda^{2}	CBFX-FM-4	89.9 FM	17,200 watts	B	Query	2000-66	48°15′55.08″N 79°1′59.88″W
Sherbrooke^{1}	CBFX-FM-2	90.7 FM	25,000 watts	B	Query	85-317, 94-763	45°23′51″N 71°50′16.08″W
Trois-Rivières^{1}	CBFX-FM-1	104.3 FM	43,000 watts	C1	Query		46°30′10.08″N 72°38′12.84″W

^{1} - On April 25, 2013, the CRTC approved the CBC's application to amend the licenses of CBFX's rebroadcasters at Trois-Rivières and Sherbrooke, with both stations broadcasting at least 20 minutes of local programming each week, with the remainder of programming from the Espace Musique network. The Trois-Rivières repeater at 104.3 MHz will upgrade to an average ERP of 45,400 watts, and a maximum ERP of 100,000 watts (up from 43,000 watts max ERP currently) with an effective height above average terrain of 249.7 metres. The Sherbrooke transmitter at 90.7 MHz will keep its existing parameters with an ERP of 25,000 watts (non-directional antenna with an EHAAT of 173 metres).

Though CBFX-4 and CBFX-5 are technically rebroadcasters of CBFX, on-air idents show they actually rebroadcast Ottawa's CBOX-FM.
