= CBMT-DT =

Television station in Montreal, Canada

- Montreal, Quebec; Canada
- Channels: Digital: 21 (UHF); Virtual: 6
- Branding: CBC Montreal

Programming
- Affiliations: 6.1: CBC Television

Ownership
- Owner: Canadian Broadcasting Corporation
- Sister stations: CBFT-DT, CBME-FM, CBM-FM, CBF-FM, CBFX-FM

History
- Founded: 1950
- First air date: January 10, 1954
- Former channel numbers: Analog: 6 (VHF, 1954–2011)
- Former affiliations: Paramount Television Network (secondary, 1954–1956)
- Call sign meaning: CBC Montreal Television

Technical information
- Licensing authority: CRTC
- ERP: 25 kW
- HAAT: 300 m (984 ft)
- Transmitter coordinates: 45°30′19″N 73°35′29″W

Links
- Website: CBC Montreal

CBMT-DT (channel 6) is a television station in Montreal, Quebec, Canada, broadcasting the English-language service of CBC Television. It is owned and operated by the Canadian Broadcasting Corporation alongside Ici Radio-Canada Télé flagship CBFT-DT (channel 2). The two stations share studios at Maison Radio-Canada on René Lévesque Boulevard East in Downtown Montreal; CBMT-DT's transmitter is located atop Mount Royal.

== History ==
CBMT was originally licensed in 1950 to operate on channel 5. It first signed on the air on January 10, 1954, as Montreal's second television station; previously, English and French-language programs had shared time on CBFT, Canada's first television station. By the end of 1953, Canada had about a dozen television stations either licensed or under construction, and American competition was about to arrive in Montreal with the construction of WCAX-TV in Burlington, Vermont, and WIRI-TV from North Pole, New York (near Plattsburgh and now known as WPTZ). The CBC decided that it was imperative to stop time-sharing in English and in French, so CBMT was included in the network's expansion plans for television; upon its sign-on, CBMT became the exclusive English-language CBC station for Montreal; CBFT, simultaneous to this, became an exclusive French-language station.

The station was branded in the late 1970s and early 1980s as "Montreal 6", becoming "CBC Television Montreal 6" by the mid-1980s, and "CBC Television Montreal" during the 1990s. Since 1997, CBMT has been the only full-fledged CBC station in the province of Quebec. Previously, the only other CBC station in the province had been Quebec City's CKMI-TV. However, in 1997, CKMI switched its affiliation to the Global Television Network. CBMT set up a full-power rebroadcaster, CBVE, on CKMI's old channel 5, while CKMI moved to channel 20.

CBMT transmits from the Mount Royal candelabra tower, in Mount Royal Park, overlooking the city of Montreal. As a result, channel 6 experiences severe multipath interference in parts of the city and South Shore.

It was also previously seen unscrambled on C-band satellite until the early-2000s, when it switched to a proprietary digital satellite signal. When the signal was sent unscrambled on the C-band, many American satellite viewers tuned into CBMT for a variety of news, entertainment, and sports – particularly the CBC's Hockey Night in Canada and Olympic Games television broadcasts, which gave a different perspective than the American broadcasts. That Canadian signal is still available, but it requires the purchase of a dedicated and expensive receiver, or a grey market subscription to a Canadian satellite service.

Due to several cutbacks over the years, master control for the station is now based at the Canadian Broadcasting Centre in Toronto.

Former logo used for local programming from 2015 to 2019

== News operation ==
CBMT-DT presently broadcasts 10 hours, 40 minutes of locally produced newscasts each week (with two hours each weekday, a half-hour on Saturdays and 10 minutes on Sundays); in regards to the number of hours devoted to news programming, it is the lowest local newscast output out of any English-language television station in the Montreal market. CBMT airs local news programming for Montreal seven days a week. On weekdays, the station airs half-hour newscasts at 6 and 11 p.m. On weekends, Montreal at 6 airs on Saturdays for 30 minutes and a ten-minute summary airs on Sundays at 11 p.m.

Anchor Debra Arbec won the Canadian Screen Award for Best Local Anchor at the 12th Canadian Screen Awards in 2024.

== Technical information ==
=== Subchannel ===
Subchannel of CBMT-DT
Subchannel	Res.	Short name	Programming
6.1	720p	CBMT-DT	CBC Television

=== Analog-to-digital conversion ===
CBMT began broadcasting its digital signal over-the-air on February 21, 2005. On August 31, 2011, when Canadian television stations in CRTC-designated mandatory markets transitioned from analog to digital broadcasts, the station's digital signal remained on UHF channel 21, using virtual channel 6.

== Former transmitters ==
CBMT once operated over 50 analog rebroadcasters throughout the province of Quebec and in three communities in northern Manitoba: Brochet, Poplar River, and Shamattawa.

Due to federal funding reductions to the CBC, in April 2012, the CBC responded with substantial budget cuts, which included shutting down the CBC's and Radio-Canada's remaining analog transmitters on July 31, 2012. None of the CBC or Radio-Canada's rebroadcasters were converted to digital.

Transmitters in mandatory markets were required to go digital or be taken off the air by the transition deadline of August 31, 2011. The CBC had originally decided that none of its rebroadcasters will transition to digital and instead will remain in analog. The CBC had rebroadcasters of CBMT in the following mandatory markets:

- CBVE-TV Quebec City
- CBJET Saguenay
- CBMT-3 Sherbrooke
- CBMT-1 Trois-Rivières

On August 16, 2011, the Canadian Radio-television and Telecommunications Commission (CRTC) granted the CBC permission to continue operating 22 repeaters in mandatory markets, including the above, in analog until August 31, 2012, by which time the transmitters had to be converted to digital or shut down.

=== Quebec ===
City of licence	Call sign	Channel	ERP (W)	Notes
Alma	CBJET-1	32 (UHF)	4,000	
Baie-Comeau	CBMIT	28 (UHF)	4,200	
Blanc-Sablon	CBMST	5 (VHF)	150	
Chandler	CBVB-TV	23 (UHF)	184	
Chibougamau	CBMCT	4 (VHF)	276	
Chicoutimi (Saguenay)	CBJET	58 (UHF)	10,000	
Chisasibi	CBMGT	12 (VHF)	10	
Escuminac	CBVA-TV	18 (UHF)	5,200	
Fermont	CBMRT	9 (VHF)	18	
Gaspé	CBVG-TV	18 (UHF)	5,000	
Harrington Harbour	CBMUT	13 (VHF)	129	
Îles-de-la-Madeleine	CBMYT	7 (VHF)	2,900	
La Tabatiere	CBMLT	10 (VHF)	62	
La Tuque	CBMET	9 (VHF)	103	
Malartic	CBVD-TV	5 (VHF)	9,300	
Maniwaki	CBVU-TV	15 (UHF)		
Mistissini	CBMDT	12 (VHF)	10	
Murdochville	CBMMT	21 (UHF)	30	
New Carlisle	CBVN-TV	45 (UHF)	5,300	
New Richmond	CBVR-TV	27 (UHF)	6,000	
Nouveau-Comploir	CBMNT	12 (VHF)	10	
Old Fort Bay	CBMVT	13 (VHF)	10	
Perce	CBVP-TV	14 (UHF)	3,700	
Port Daniel	CBVF-TV	16 (UHF)	1,310	
Quebec City	CBVE-TV	5 (VHF)	13,850	Formerly CKMI-TV
Rivière-Saint-Paul	CBMPT	11 (VHF)	23	
Saguenay	CBJET	58 (UHF)		
Saint-Augustin (Saguenay)	CBMXT	7 (VHF)	10	
Schefferville	CBSET-1	7 (VHF)	89	
Sept-Îles	CBSET	3 (VHF)	1,500	
Sherbrooke	CBMT-3	50 (UHF)	11,000	
Thetford Mines	CBMT-4	32	1,140	
Trois-Rivières	CBMT-1	28 (UHF)	13,000	
Wakeham	CBVH-TV	24 (UHF)	100	
Waskaganish	CBMHT	12 (VHF)	10	
Waswanipi	CBVW-TV	10 (VHF)	5	
Wemindji	CBMNT	12 (VHF)		

The Schefferville repeater began broadcasting on August 22, 1965, as CFKL-TV on channel 11. It originally was established by Hollinger Ungava Transport, an affiliate of the Iron Ore Company of Canada Aviation Limited, to provide television service to the town, where the company operated a smelter. It broadcast seven to eight hours a day of videotaped CBC Television and Radio-Canada programs. Previously, CFKL radio had operated and been sold to the CBC in 1965. Iron Ore owned CFKL and CJCL-TV in Labrador City, Newfoundland, but under a Canadian cabinet directive, it could not own the stations because it was not 80 percent or more Canadian-owned. In 1973, the CBC applied to purchase the stations from Iron Ore. Under the CBC, its call sign changed to CBSET-1.

=== Northeast Ontario ===
City of licence	Call sign	Channel	Notes
Armstrong	CBLIT	10	Part of the licence for CBLT-DT/Toronto, but it repeated CBMT's signal.

=== Northern Manitoba ===
City of licence	Call sign	Channel	ERP
Brochet	CBDE-TV	9 (VHF)	
Poplar River	CBDI-TV	13 (VHF)	10
Shamattawa	CBDG-TV	9 (VHF)	10

== Audience outside Canada ==
CBMT also has substantial viewership in the United States, mostly from Maine to northeastern New York. It is also seen via cable television in Michigan, northern Wisconsin, and northern Minnesota; CBMT is the main CBC station for Charter Spectrum systems in Bay City, Midland, Mount Pleasant, Alpena and Marquette, Michigan.

CBMT is also broadcast in Jamaica and Trinidad and Tobago on Flow Cable and in the Bahamas on Cable Bahamas.

== See also ==
- List of Quebec media
