= Place du Royaume =

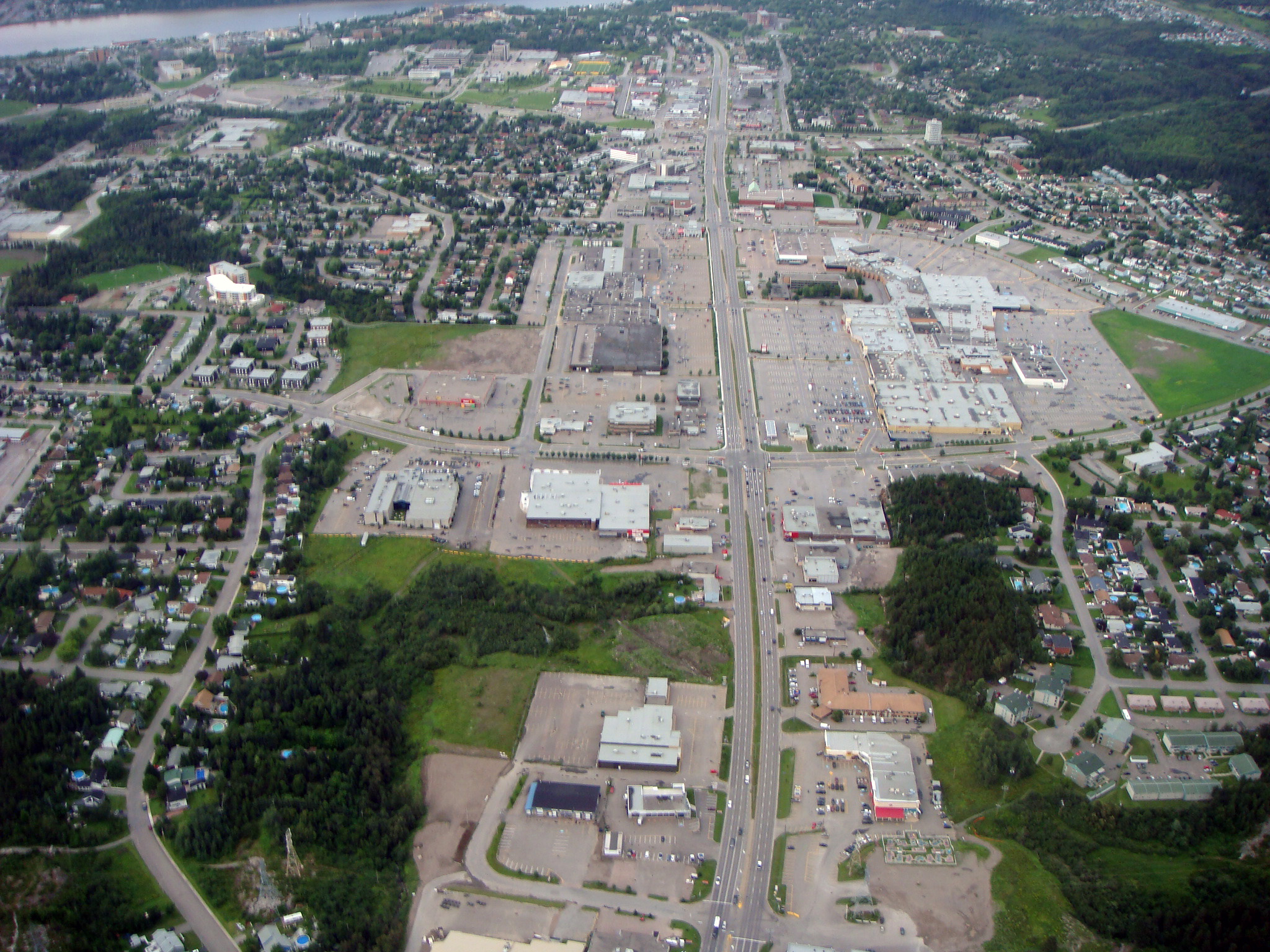
- Place du Royaume
- Location: Saguenay, Quebec
- Coordinates: 48°24′17″N 71°03′18″W
- Address: 1401, boulevard Talbot; Chicoutimi, Quebec; G7H 5N6
- Opened: August 1973
- Manager: Primaris
- Owner: Primaris
- Num. of stores: 140
- Num. of anchor tenants: 10
- Floor area: 604,000 sq ft (56,100 m^{2})
- Floors: 1
- Website: placeduroyaume.com

Place du Royaume is regional shopping mall located in the Chicoutimi district of Saguenay, Quebec, Canada. It is the largest mall in the Saguenay–Lac-Saint-Jean and contains 160 stores.

The anchors are Canadian Tire, Walmart, Winners, Best Buy, Cinéma Odyssée, Sports Experts/Hockey Expert/Atmosphère, Pharmaprix, L'Équipeur, Urban Planet, Bouclair, H&M, and Yellow. Many retailers are there, including Reitmans, Tommy Hilfiger, Jack & Jones, Laura, and La Senza, among others. Near the cinema, there is a food court with restaurants such as Tim Hortons, McDonald's, Sushi Shop, KFC, Au vieux Duluth Express, and Sukiyaki.

The mall is located right face to Place du Saguenay, another shopping centre with anchor stores l'Aubainerie, Clément, and IGA Extra (in the former Zellers location).

== History ==
The mall opened in August 1973 with 75 stores and anchors Woolco and Steinberg's. Four years after its opening, the mall had doubled size and added the Bay store.

Steinberg's became Parade in 1985, another brand of Steinberg's, which in turn changed in 1987 for Super Marché Avantage, also a brand of Steinberg's. In the early 1990s, Héritage took the space of the former Steinberg's but sold a portion of it which is now occupied by other stores. Héritage made room for Provigo in 1996. Future Shop now occupies the former space of Provigo.

Woolco became Walmart in 1994.

The Bay was present until May 2007. It closed in the same time as The Bay store at Place Vertu in the Montreal borough of Saint-Laurent. The Bay's mall space has been sub-divided by Tommy Hilfiger, Dynamite, Winners, Bouclair, L'Équipeur, Urban Planet, Histories de Filles, Joshua Perets, and Amnesia.

Other stores that have closed: Toys "R" Us, Consumers Distributing, Athlete's World, Stéréo Plus, Cohoes, Scotiabank, Greiche & Scaff, Historia, Action Sport, Pegabo, Transit, A&W, Le Rouet, and Aéropostale.
