= CBF-FM-10 =

Ici Radio-Canada Première station in Quebec

- Sherbrooke, Quebec; Canada
- Broadcast area: Estrie and Centre-du-Québec
- Frequency: 101.1 MHz

Programming
- Format: News/Talk
- Network: Ici Radio-Canada Première

Ownership
- Owner: Canadian Broadcasting Corporation

History
- First air date: early 1980s (as a rebroadcaster of CBF-FM); 2000 (as an originating station)
- Call sign meaning: Canadian Broadcasting Corporation French

Technical information
- Class: B
- ERP: 35 kW horizontal polarization only
- HAAT: 173 metres (568 ft)

Links
- Website: Ici Radio-Canada Première

CBF-FM-10 is a French-language Canadian radio station located in Sherbrooke, Quebec.

Owned and operated by the (government-owned) Canadian Broadcasting Corporation (French: Société Radio-Canada), it broadcasts on 101.1 MHz with an effective radiated power of 35,000 watts (class B) using an omnidirectional antenna.

The station has an ad-free news/talk format and is part of the Ici Radio-Canada Première network, which operates across Canada. Like all Première stations, but unlike most FM stations, it broadcasts in mono.

The station first went on the air in the early 1980s as a rebroadcaster of CBF in Montreal. For many years, Radio-Canada programming had aired on privately owned affiliate CHLT. However, in 1979, CHLT received permission to disaffiliate from Radio-Canada as soon as Radio-Canada could set up its own station there. Despite Sherbrooke's large size, the CBC opted not to open a full-fledged station there at first.

However, in 2000, the CBC received permission to upgrade its Sherbrooke operation to a full-fledged station, despite retaining a rebroadcaster-like call sign.

The station's current local programs are Par ici l'info from and Écoutez l'Estrie. On public holidays, its local programs are replaced with local shows airing provincewide (Quebec) produced by different outlets in turn (except Montreal and Quebec City). The Saturday morning program, Samedi et rien d'autre, originates from CBF-FM.

== Transmitters ==
Rebroadcasters of CBF-FM-10
City of licence	Identifier	Frequency	Power	Class	RECNet	CRTC Decision	Notes
Lac-Mégantic	CBF-FM-6	91.3 FM	591 watts	A	Query	86-12	45°31′46.92″N 70°47′17.16″W
Magog	CBF-FM-2	93.1 FM	420 watts	B	Query	2003-2002005-336	45°18′42.84″N 72°14′30.12″W
Val-des-Sources	CBF-FM-11	96.1 FM	1,000 watts	A	Query		45°50′34.08″N 71°56′35.88″W
Victoriaville	CBF-FM-12	92.7 FM	130 watts	A1	Query		46°2′12.12″N 71°54′7.92″W
