= CHLM-FM =

Ici Radio-Canada Première station in Rouyn-Noranda, Quebec

- Rouyn-Noranda, Quebec; Canada
- Broadcast area: Abitibi-Témiscamingue
- Frequency: 90.7 MHz

Programming
- Format: News/Talk
- Network: Ici Radio-Canada Première

Ownership
- Owner: Canadian Broadcasting Corporation

History
- First air date: 1976

Technical information
- Class: B1
- Power: 11,422 watts horizontal 7,547 watts vertical
- HAAT: 178 metres (584 ft)

Links
- Website: Ici Radio-Canada Première

CHLM-FM is a Canadian radio station, broadcasting at 90.7 FM in Rouyn-Noranda, Quebec. The station broadcasts the programming of the Ici Radio-Canada Première network.

== History ==
In 1976, then-owner Radio-Nord Communications was granted a license from the CRTC, in which the station would operate as Radio-Canada's private affiliate of what was then called "Première Chaîne"; also included was a rebroadcaster, CHLM-FM-1 at Lithium Mines, serving nearby Val-d'Or, operating on 97.3 MHz with effective radiated power of 52,000 watts. In 1979, CHLM-FM-1 was authorized to move to 103.5 MHz and to increase effective radiated power to 55,300 watts.

CHLM-FM and CHLM-FM-1 signed on the air by 1980; eventually, CHLM-FM-1's city of license would have changed to Amos, and broadcasting on another different frequency, 91.5 MHz.

On September 7, 1989, the station was denied a licence to add a transmitter at Ville-Marie, Quebec on 100.5 MHz. In 2002, the CBC would add a transmitter of their own serving Ville-Marie, CBFY-FM 89.1, rebroadcasting CHLM-FM.

In February 2000, CHLM-FM and CHLM-FM-1 became full-time re-broadcasters of the Radio-Canada network.

It was directly acquired by the CBC in 2004.

== Programming ==
The station's local programs are Des matins en or, and Région Zéro 8 in the afternoons. On public holidays, its local programs are replaced with local shows airing provincewide (Quebec) produced by different outlets in turn (except Montreal and Quebec City). The Saturday morning program, Samedi et rien d'autre, originates from CBF-FM Montreal.

== Transmitters ==
Rebroadcasters of CHLM-FM
City of licence	Identifier	Frequency	Power	Class	RECNet	CRTC Decision	Notes
Val-d'Or/Amos	CHLM-FM-1	91.5 FM	34400 watts	B	Query	89-677	48°12′1.08″N 78°7′14.88″W
La Sarre	CHLM-FM-2	100.7 FM	4290 watts	A	Query	2007-105	48°47′21.84″N 79°13′5.16″W
Lebel-sur-Quévillon	CBF-FM-3	94.9 FM	50 watts	LP	Query	2017-291	49°2′57.84″N 76°58′46.92″W
Matagami	CBF-FM-4	97.7 FM	130 watts	A1	Query	2019-47	49°45′27″N 77°38′34.08″W
Senneterre	CBF-FM-1	95.9 FM	115 watts	A1	Query	2017-291	48°22′32.88″N 77°13′9.12″W
Témiscaming	CBFZ-FM	103.1 FM	1500 watts	A	Query	2001-261	46°38′27.96″N 79°4′23.16″W; Transmitter site in Ontario
Ville-Marie	CBFY-FM	89.1 FM	15900 watts	C1	Query	2002-445	47°15′15.84″N 79°22′36.84″W

On October 17, 1986 the CRTC approved the CBC's application to change CBF-3's frequency from 1400 to 650 kHz.

On July 29, 2010, the CRTC approved the application to transfer transmitters CBF-1, CBF-3 and CBF-4 from CBF-FM Montreal to CHLM-FM.

On March 8, 2017, the CBC applied to convert CBF-1 710 to 95.9 MHz with the proposed callsign CBF-FM-1.

On March 9, 2017, the CBC applied to convert CBF-3 650 to 94.9 MHz with the proposed callsign CBF-FM-3. The CBC received approval to convert both CBF-1 Senneterre and CBF-3 Lebel-sur-Quévillon to the FM band on August 17, 2017.

On December 5, 2018, the CBC applied to convert CBF-4 to 97.7 MHz with the proposed callsign CBF-FM-4. The CRTC approved the CBC's application to convert CBF-4 to the FM band on February 15, 2019.
