= CJAB-FM =

Radio station in Saguenay, Quebec

Coordinates: 48°36′04″N 70°49′44″W

- Saguenay, Quebec; Canada
- Broadcast area: Saguenay–Lac-Saint-Jean
- Frequency: 94.5 MHz
- Branding: Énergie 94.5

Programming
- Language: French
- Format: Mainstream rock
- Affiliations: Énergie

Ownership
- Owner: Bell Media; (Bell Media Radio)
- Sister stations: CFIX-FM, CFRS-DT

History
- First air date: May 10, 1979
- Former frequencies: 96.7 MHz (1979–1983)

Technical information
- Class: C
- ERP: 100,000 watts peak
- HAAT: 539.5 metres (1,770 ft)

Links
- Webcast: Listen Live
- Website: radioenergie.ca/saguenay.html

CJAB-FM is a French-language Canadian radio station located in Saguenay, Quebec. Its studios are located at Rue Racine Est in the former city of Chicoutimi (co-located with sister stations CFIX-FM and Noovo owned-and-operated station CFRS-DT), with its transmitter atop Mount Valin.

Owned and operated by Bell Media, it broadcasts on 94.5 MHz using a directional antenna with a peak effective radiated power of 100,000 watts (class C).

Last CJAB logo using the Énergie branding.

Logo under NRJ branding, 2009-2015

The station has a mainstream rock format and is part of the "Énergie" network which operates across Quebec. It started operations as a sister station to CKRS-FM (now owned by Cogeco-affiliated Radio Saguenay since September 2010).

== History ==
CJAB-FM originally began broadcasting in 1979 at 96.7 MHz and later moved to its current frequency at 94.5 MHz in 1983. On November 5, 1981, CJAB-FM received CRTC approval add a rebroadcast FM transmitter at Chambord on 95.5 MHz with an effective radiated power of 3,240 watts.

The station has been part of the Énergie network since the early 1990s which operates across Quebec. CJAB started operations on May 10, 1979. The station was bought by Radiomutuel in 1992 (predecessor of Astral Media), along with then-sister station CKRS 98.3 (now owned by Cogeco-affiliated Radio Saguenay).
