= CBM-FM =

CBC Music station in Montreal, Canada

- Montreal, Quebec; Canada
- Broadcast area: Greater Montreal; Sherbrooke; Quebec City; Iqaluit
- Frequency: 93.5 MHz
- Branding: CBC Music

Programming
- Format: Adult contemporary/Public music

Ownership
- Owner: Canadian Broadcasting Corporation
- Sister stations: CBME-FM, CBF-FM, CBFX-FM, CBMT-DT, CBFT-DT

History
- First air date: 1947
- Former frequencies: 100.7 MHz (1947–1971); 95.1 MHz (1971–1977)
- Call sign meaning: Canadian Broadcasting Corporation Montreal

Technical information
- Class: C1
- ERP: 100,000 watts horizontal polarization only
- HAAT: 242.5 meters (796 ft)

Links
- Website: CBC Montreal

CBM-FM (93.5 MHz) is a public non-commercial radio station in Montreal, Quebec. It carries the English-language CBC Music network.

Owned and operated by the government-owned Canadian Broadcasting Corporation, CBM-FM is a Class C1 station. It transmits from the Mount Royal candelabra tower with an effective radiated power of 100,000 watts, using horizontal polarization. Its studios and offices, along with those of CBME-FM (broadcasting CBC Radio One), are located at Maison Radio-Canada on René Lévesque Boulevard.

== History ==
In 1947, CBM-FM first signed on at 100.7 MHz. In its early years, it simulcast the programming of co-owned CBM. French language CBF-FM also officially went on the air that year, at 95.1 MHz, although it had done experimental broadcasts for several years leading up to its sign-on.

In 1960, CBM-FM began airing separate programming, along with the other CBC FM stations, playing mostly classical music. It became a simulcast of CBM again in 1962, but returned to separate programming in 1964.

In 1971, CBM-FM moved to 95.1 MHz, while CBF-FM took over the 100.7 frequency vacated by CBM-FM. The exchange was made because the 100.7 frequency that was vacated had a larger coverage area and was thus deemed more suitable to serve the larger French-speaking audience. The downgrade was the result of a new bilateral arrangement with the United States for FM radio allocations. However, reception on the new frequency was poor, and as a result in July 1976 the CBC was approved by the Canadian Radio-television and Telecommunications Commission to move to 93.5 MHz. The change was made on 3 October 1977.

The CBC FM network was rebranded CBC Stereo on 3 November 1975 and CBC Radio Two in 1997. In 2006, CBM-FM and other Radio Two stations began a transition from mostly classical and jazz programming to a mix of adult album alternative, singer-songwriter and world music, as well as some classical and jazz.

The weeknight version of the jazz program Tonic, hosted by Katie Malloch, originated from CBM-FM until Malloch's retirement in 2012.

== Rebroadcasters ==
Rebroadcasters of CBM-FM
| City of licence | Identifier | Frequency | Power | Class | RECNet | CRTC Decision | Notes |
|---|---|---|---|---|---|---|---|
| Sherbrooke | CBM-FM-1 | 89.7 FM | 25,000 watts | B | Query | 99–466 | 45°23′51″N 71°50′16.08″W |
| Quebec City | CBM-FM-2 | 96.1 FM | 800 watts | B | Query | 2001-510 | 46°49′22.08″N 71°29′43.08″W |
| Iqaluit, Nunavut | CBM-FM-3 | 88.3 FM | 800 watts | A | Query | 2006-676 | 63°44′21.12″N 68°33′20.88″W |
