= CBF-FM-8 =

Ici Radio-Canada Première station in Quebec

- Trois-Rivières, Quebec; Canada
- Broadcast area: Mauricie
- Frequency: 96.5 MHz

Programming
- Format: News/Talk
- Network: Ici Radio-Canada Première

Ownership
- Owner: Canadian Broadcasting Corporation

History
- First air date: 1977 (as a rebroadcaster of CBF-FM Montreal); Start date; 2000 (as an originating station)
- Call sign meaning: Canadian Broadcasting Corporation French

Technical information
- Class: C
- ERP: 100 kW

Links
- Website: Ici Radio-Canada Première

CBF-FM-8 is a French-language Canadian radio station located in Trois-Rivières, Quebec.

Owned and operated by public broadcaster Canadian Broadcasting Corporation as part of the French-language Société Radio-Canada system, it broadcasts on 96.5 MHz using a directional antenna with an average effective radiated power of 66,700 watts and a peak effective radiated power of 100,000 watts (class C1).

The station has an ad-free news/talk format and is part of the Ici Radio-Canada Première network, which operates across Canada. Like all Première stations, but unlike most FM stations, it broadcasts in mono.

The station signed on in 1977 as a full-time rebroadcaster of CBF in Montreal. Before then, Radio-Canada programming had aired on private affiliate CHLN. However, despite Trois-Rivières' large size, the CBC opted not to open a full-fledged station in the city. It became a separately licensed station in 2000, while retaining a rebroadcaster-like callsign.

The station's current local programs are Facteur matinal from 6 a.m. to 9 a.m. and 360 PM in the afternoons from 3:30 p.m. to 6 p.m. On public holidays, its local programs are replaced with local shows airing provincewide (Quebec) produced by different outlets in turn (except Montreal and Quebec City). The Saturday morning program, Samedi et rien d'autre, originates from CBF-FM.

CBF-FM-8 was originally on 100.1 MHz, and moved to 88.1 MHz in 1985. It moved to its current frequency at 96.5 MHz in late 2003.

== Transmitters ==
Rebroadcasters of CBF-FM-8
City of licence	Identifier	Frequency	Power	Class	RECNet	CRTC Decision	Notes
La Tuque	CBF-FM-19	103.7 FM	11,300 watts	B	Query	2002-451	47°25′24.96″N 72°45′47.16″W
Clova	CBF-FM-16	95.1 FM	139 watts	A1	Query	2023-168	48°6′30.96″N 75°21′34.92″W
Lac-Édouard	CBF-FM-17	99.9 FM	141 watts	A1	Query	2022-13	47°40′0.84″N 72°16′18.12″W
Parent	CBF-FM-18	99.9 FM	50 watts	LP	Query	2017-199	47°55′21″N 74°37′14.88″W
Wemotaci	CBFG-FM-3	92.3 FM	50 watts	LP	Query		47°54′15.84″N 73°46′39″W
Manawan	CBFA-FM-1	103.5 FM	22 watts	A1	Query		47°13′23.88″N 74°23′44.16″W
Obedjiwan	CBFA-FM-2	92.9 FM	83 watts	A1	Query		48°39′20.88″N 74°56′17.16″W

On January 23, 1986, a number of low-power CBC AM transmitters in various communities in Quebec were approved to change to new AM frequencies. One of them, CBF-18 Parent, moved from 1240 kHz to 710 kHz and moved to the FM band to its current frequency at 99.9 MHz in circa. 2017.

On August 2, 2018, the CRTC approved the transfer of transmitters CBFA-FM-1 Manouane, CBFA-FM-2 Obedjiwan and CBFG-FM-3 Weymontachie, Québec from license CBFG-FM Chisasibi, Québec to station CBF-FM-8 Trois-Rivières, Québec. (CRTC Administrative Decision 2018-0526-9, August 2, 2018)

On November 17, 2021, the CBC submitted an application to the CRTC to move CBF-17 (formerly CBV-2) Lac-Édouard, Quebec from the AM band 710 kHz to the FM band at 99.9 MHz. The CRTC approved the CBC's application to convert CBF-17 Lac-Édouard from 710 kHz to 99.9 MHz on January 26, 2022.

On March 7, 2023, the CBC submitted an application to the CRTC to move CBF-16 Clova, Quebec from AM 990 kHz to FM 95.1 MHz. The CRTC approved the CBC's application to move CBF-16 Clova from the AM band to the FM band at 95.1 MHz on June 1, 2023. On August 30, 2024, the CBC applied to change the FM frequency of CBF-FM-16 Clova from 95.1 MHz to a new frequency 99.9 MHz. The CBC received approval to move CBF-FM-16 Clova from 95.1 MHz to 99.9 MHz on November 8, 2024.
