= VE9EC =

Experimental television station in Montréal, Quebec, Canada (1931–1935)

VE9EC was a Canadian experimental television station, based in Montreal, Quebec. It broadcast between October 9, 1931, and 1935, showing neon red pictures. It was owned by La Presse and CKAC radio station. VE9EC was a mechanical television broadcast of 60 to 150 lines of resolution at 41 MHz. VE9EC broadcast musical programmes and a radio play, La paix chez soi, starring Henri Letondal, until 1933. Other broadcasting experiments with mechanical television took place, in particular by the Montreal department store Eaton's, also in 1933.
