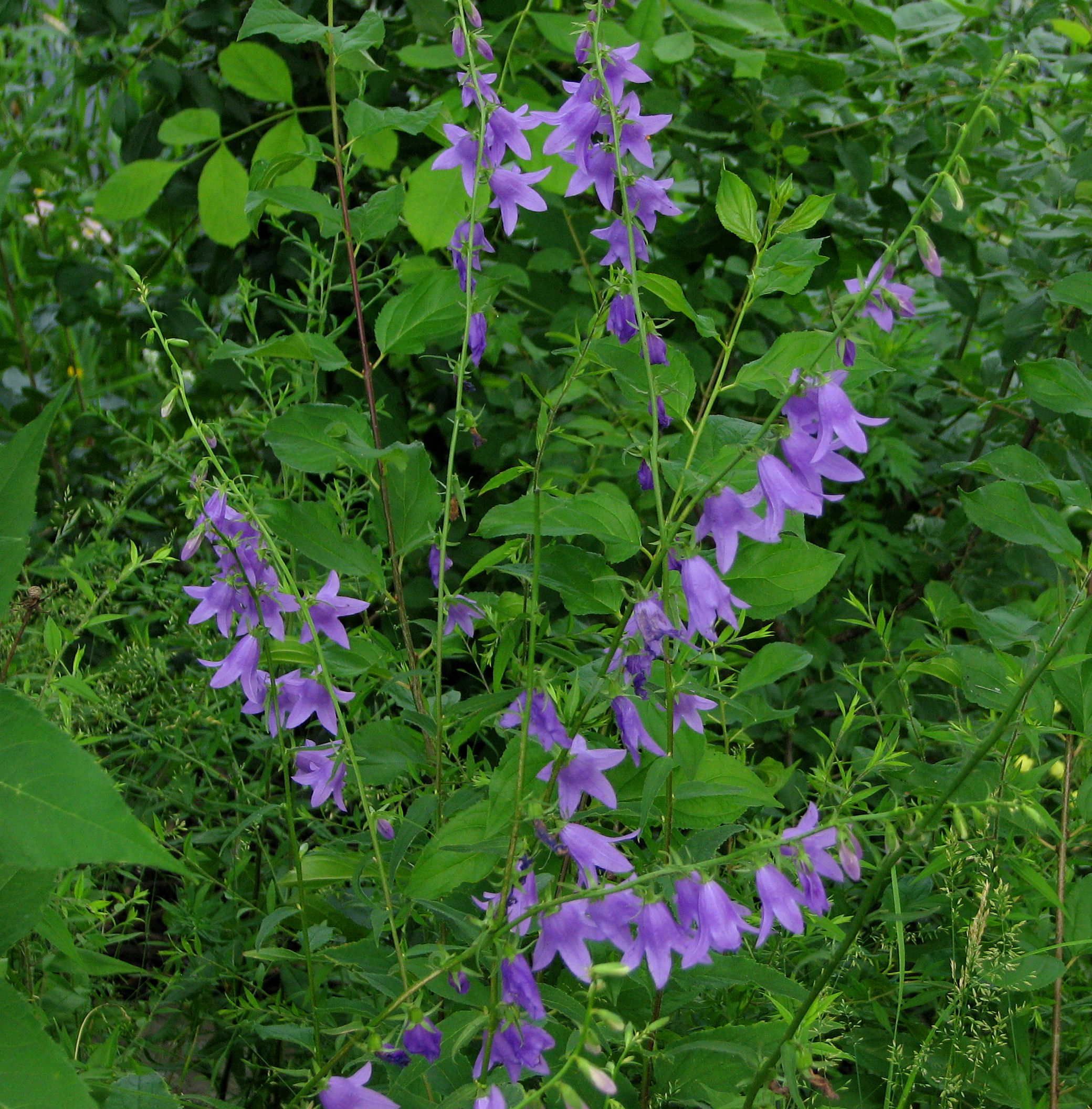
- Campanula rapunculoides, Ottawa, Ontario

Scientific classification
- Kingdom: Plantae
- Clade: Tracheophytes
- Clade: Angiosperms
- Clade: Eudicots
- Clade: Asterids
- Order: Asterales
- Family: Campanulaceae
- Genus: Campanula
- Species: C. rapunculoides

Binomial name
- Campanula rapunculoides L.

Synonyms
- Campanula morifolia Salisb.; Ca. rapunculiformis St.-Lag. nom. illeg.; Ca. rapunculoides var. ucranica (Besser) K.Koch; Ca. rhomboidea Falk; Ca. rigida Stokes nom. illeg.; Ca. ucranica Schult.; Cenekia rapunculoides (L.) Opiz; Drymocodon rapunculoides (L.) Fourr.; Rapunculus redivivus E.H.L.Krause

= Campanula rapunculoides =

Species of flowering plant

Campanula rapunculoides, known by the common names creeping bellflower, rampion bellflower, rover bellflower, garden bluebell, creeping bluebell, purple bell, garden harebell, and creeping campanula, is a perennial herbaceous plant of the genus Campanula, belonging to the family Campanulaceae. Native to central and southern Europe and west Asia, in some parts of North America it is an extremely invasive species.

== Etymology ==
The genus Latin name (Campanula), meaning 'small bell', refers to the bell-shape of the flower, while the specific name (rapunculoides) refers to the similarity to Campanula rapunculus.

== Description ==
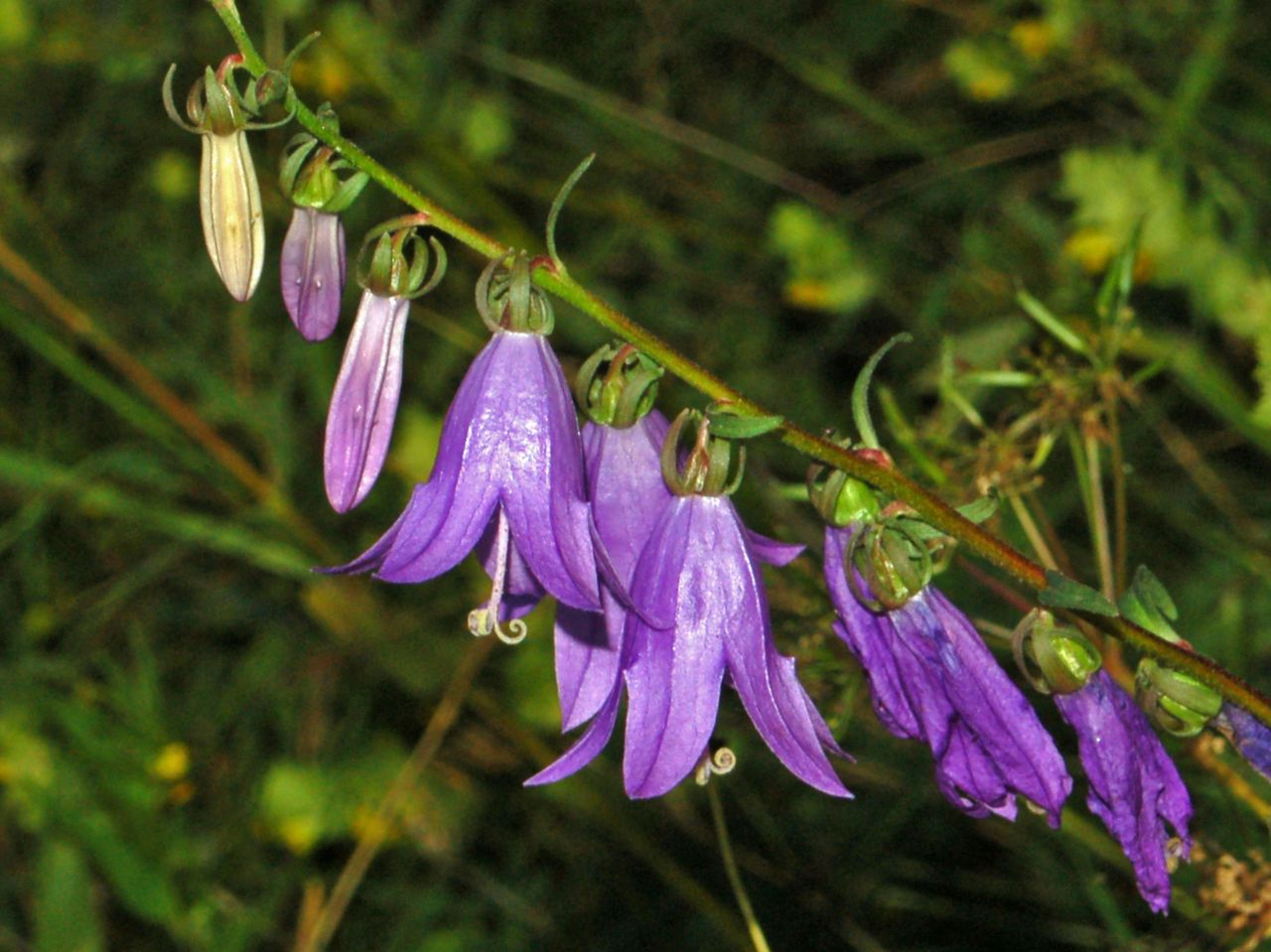
Close-up on flowers of Campanula rapunculoides

Campanula rapunculoides reaches on average 30–80 centimetres (12–31 in) of height, with a maximum of 120 centimetres (47 in). The stem is simple, erect and lightly pubescent and the leaves are usually shortly hairy. The basal leaves are triangular, narrow, with a heart-shaped or rounded base, jagged edges and are up to 12 centimetres (4.7 in) long. The upper stem leaves are sessile, lanceolate, and shortly stalked.

The inflorescence consists of nodding spikelike racemes with numerous drooping flowers. The flowers are bright blue-violet (rarely white), 2 to 4 centimetres (0.79 to 1.57 in) long, with short petioles standing to one side in the axils of the bracts. The bracts are quite different and smaller than the leaves. The sepals are lanceolate to ovate-lanceolate, entire, wide at the base up to 2.5 millimetres (0.098 in). The corolla is bell-shaped, with five deep lobes slightly ciliate. The flowering period extends from June through September. The flowers are pollinated by insects (bees, flies, butterflies, etc.) (entomophily). The fruit is a capsule with five pores near the base, where the seeds are spread.

The plant seeds abundantly (each plant can produce 15,000 seeds), and while some roots come out when it is pulled, the horizontal rhizomes grow vertical storage tubers, which may not be anywhere near the surface portions of the plant. These storage tubers can regrow rhizomes, which in turn send up shoots at some distance from the storage tubers.

This plant has its overwintering buds situated just below the soil surface (hemicryptophyte). It spreads by underground rhizomes and produces deep, taproot-shaped tubers. Both are white and fleshy. Because any piece of the roots can sprout into a new plant, it is extremely hard to eradicate.

== Distribution ==
This plant is native to Europe and western Siberia, where it grows in semi-shaded areas like open woods, the edges of denser forests, and meadowland. It has been introduced to North America, where it has become an extremely invasive weed; it chokes out other plants, and eliminating it is nearly impossible due to its multiple propagation mechanisms.

Like many related Campanula species and more distant relatives, it is edible and was historically grown for food. The roots, shoots, and leaves are all edible. The roots can be eaten raw or cooked, and the upper parts are mild-flavoured; indeed rather bland, commonplace, and somewhat chewy-leaved; the basal leaves are often cooked as a pot herb, where they blend in with other leaves unnoticeably.

== Habitat ==
It grows on grassy places, dry hills, meadows, in deciduous and pine forests, woods, fields and roadsides, along railway lines and hedgerows, preferably in partial shade, in dry to moist sites and on clay soils, relatively rich in nitrogen, at an altitude of 0–2,000 metres (0–6,562 ft) above sea level. It also occurs in cultivated fields as a weed.

== Gallery ==
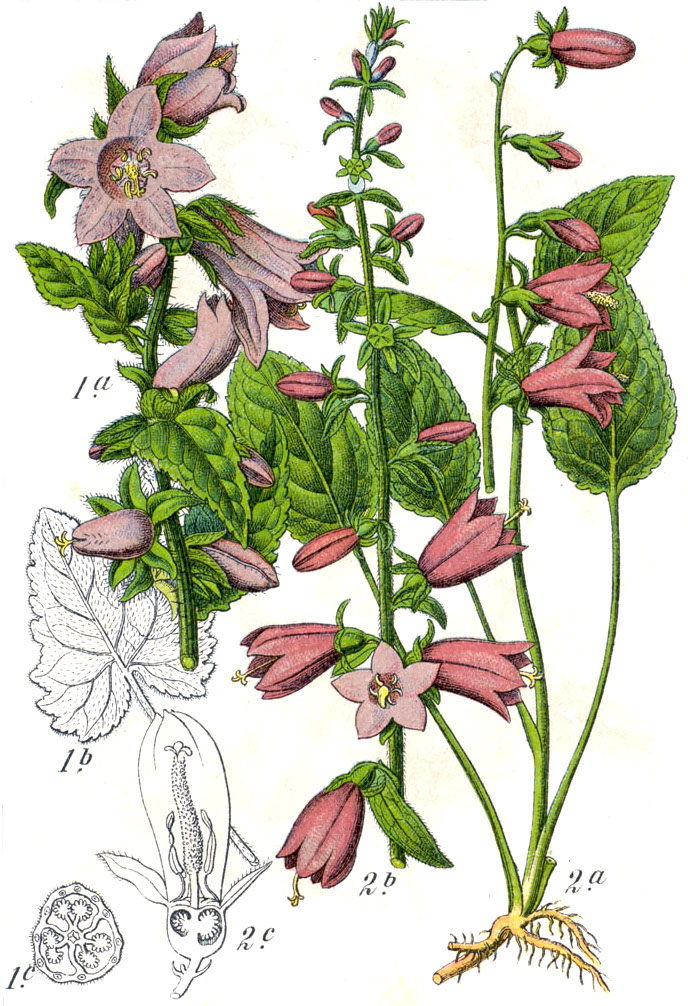
Illustration of Campanula rapunculoides (right) from Deutschlands Flora in Abbildunge (1796)

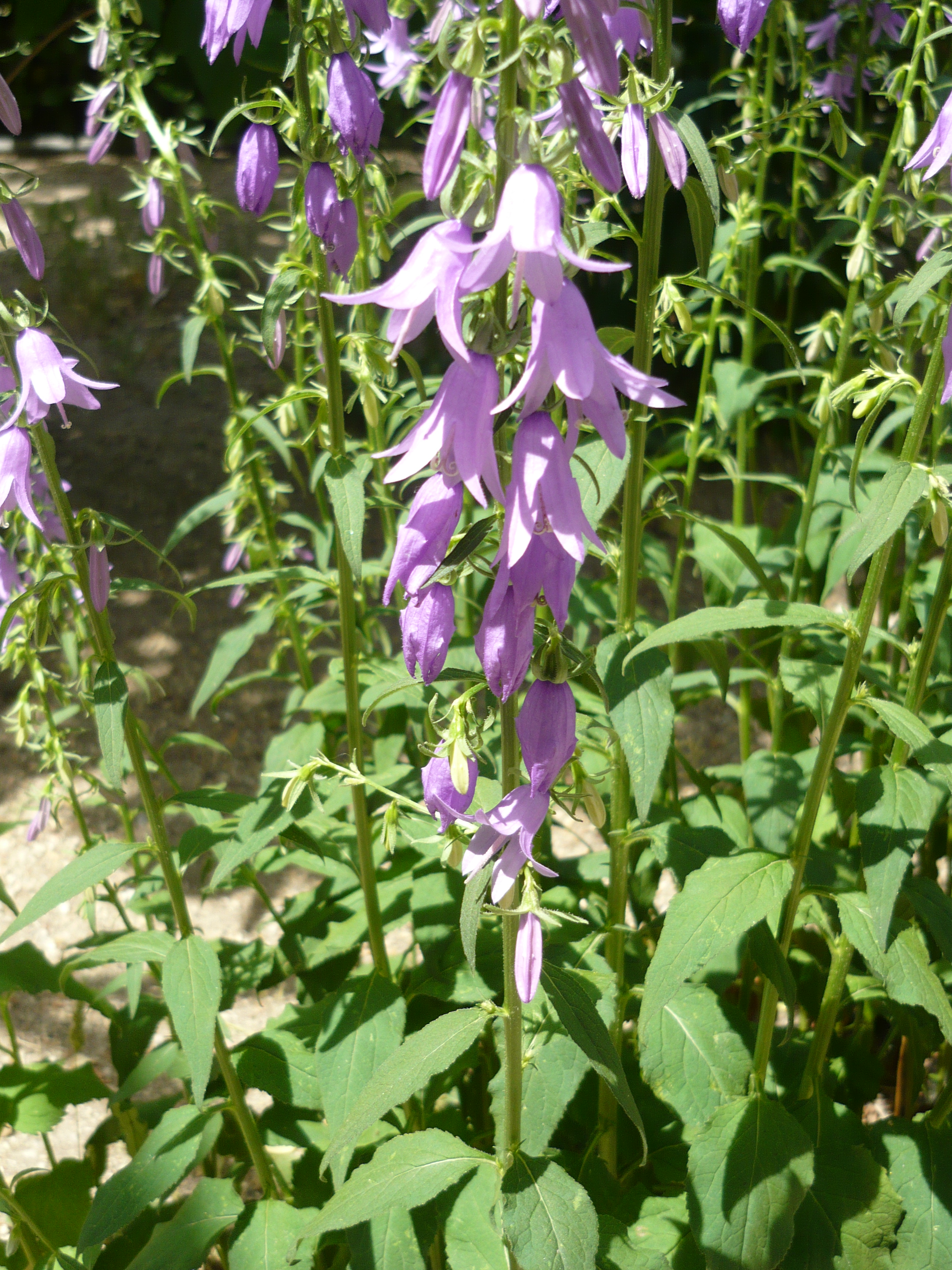
Plant of Campanula rapunculoides

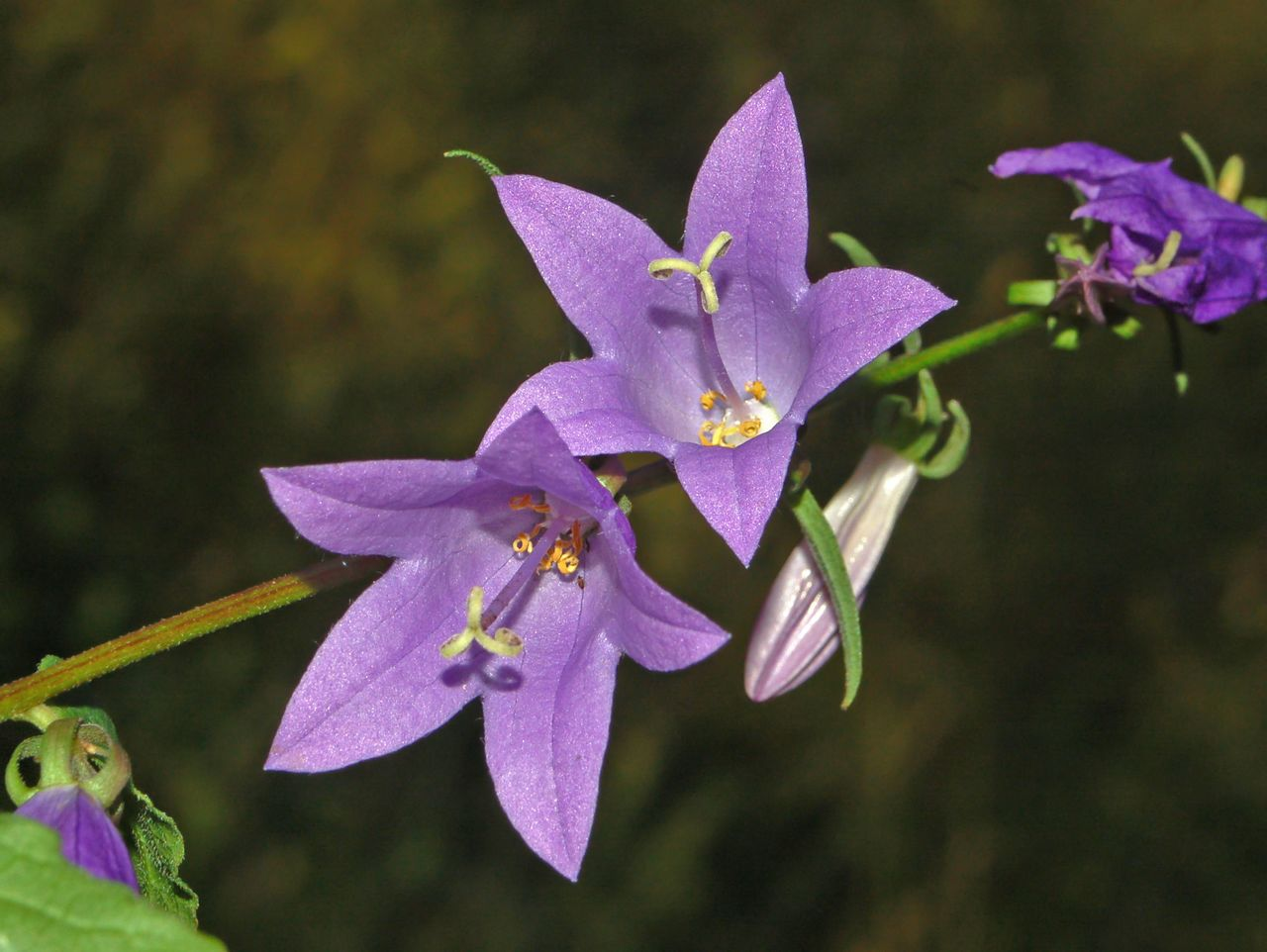
Close-up on flowers of Campanula rapunculoides

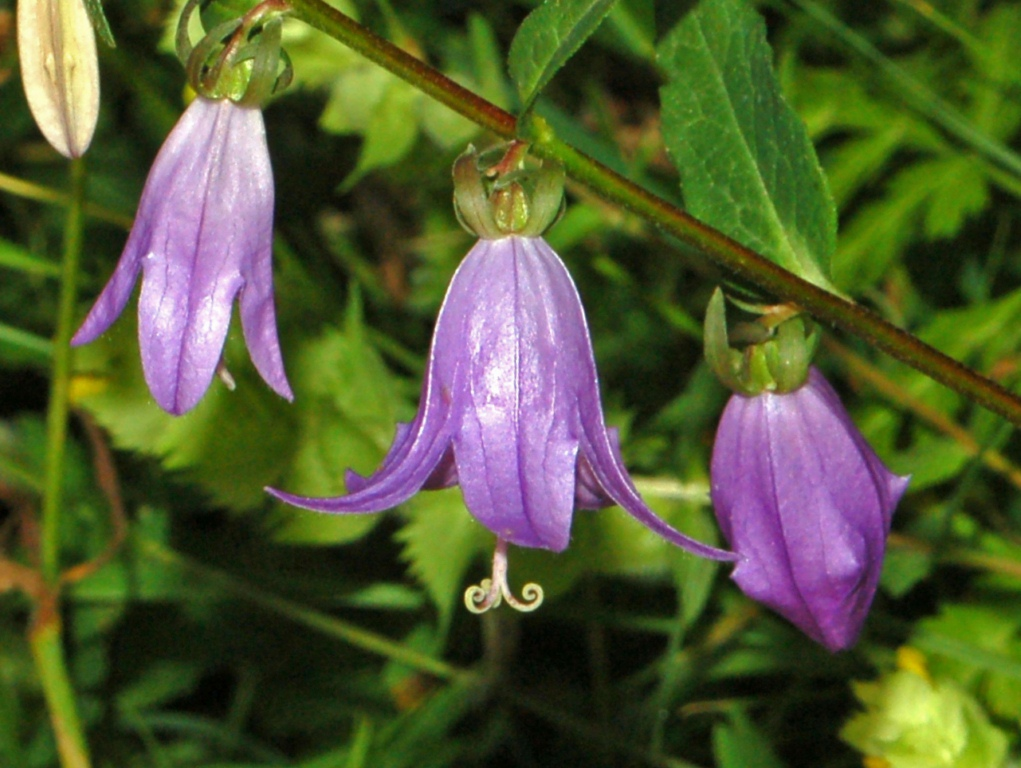
Flowers of Campanula rapunculoides

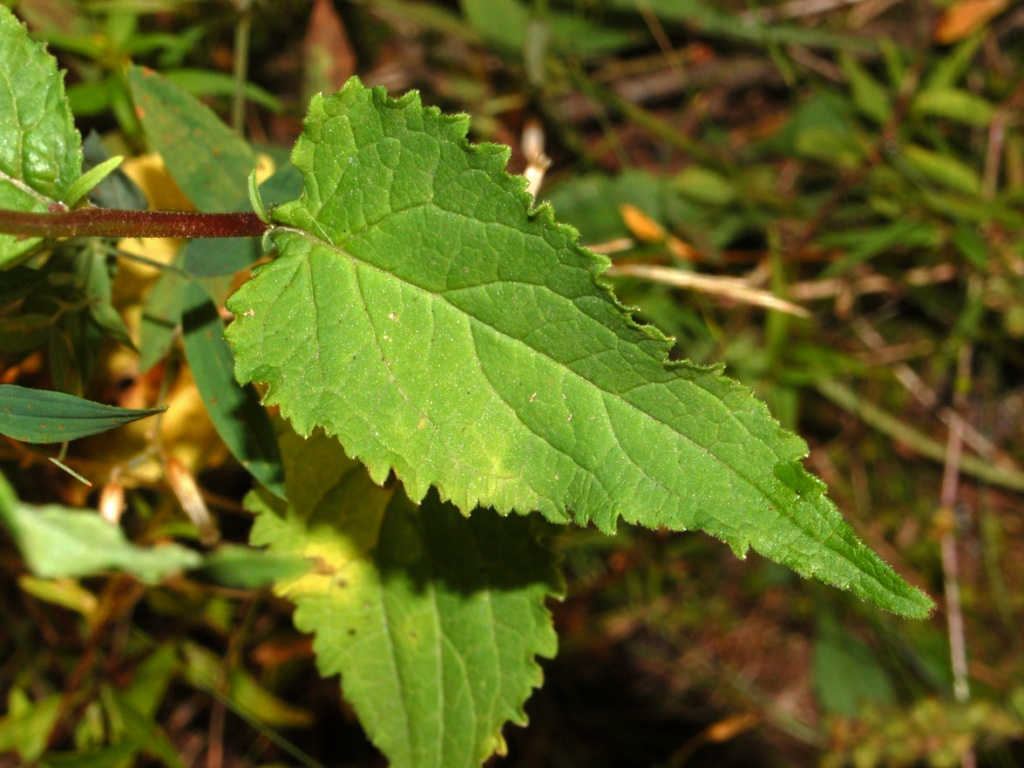
Leaf of Campanula rapunculoides

== Invasive species ==
Campanula rapunculoides is native to parts of Eurasia, but is a widespread European import to North America, and it is invasive.

It is extremely difficult to remove. Mechanical removal, burning, and chemicals have varying success rates, but there is no sure method of removing the plants first try.
