= C-Repeat Binding Factor =

Transcription factor

C-Repeat Binding Factors (CBFs) are transcription factors in plants involved in response to low temperature. Also known as Dehydration Response Element Binding factors (DREBs), they are a subfamily of AP2 DNA-binding domain transcription factors. Mutation studies on CBF genes in Arabidopsis thaliana have shown significant effects on sensitivity to both freezing and salinity.
