= CFIX-FM =

Radio station in Saguenay, Quebec

Coordinates: 48°36′04″N 70°49′44″W

- Saguenay, Quebec; Canada
- Broadcast area: Saguenay–Lac-Saint-Jean
- Frequency: 96.9 MHz
- Branding: 96,9 Rouge

Programming
- Language: French
- Format: Adult contemporary
- Affiliations: Rouge FM

Ownership
- Owner: Bell Media
- Sister stations: CJAB-FM, CFRS-DT

History
- First air date: July 31, 1987

Technical information
- Class: C
- ERP: 47,600 watts average; 100,000 watts peak
- HAAT: 539.5 metres (1,770 ft)

Links
- Webcast: Listen Live
- Website: rougefm.ca/saguenay.html

CFIX-FM is a French-language Canadian radio station in Saguenay, Quebec, Canada. Owned and operated by Bell Media, it broadcasts on 96.9 MHz using a directional antenna with a maximum effective radiated power of 100,000 watts (class C). Its studios are located at Rue Racine Est (co-located with sister stations CJAB-FM and Noovo owned-and-operated station CFRS-DT) in the former city of Chicoutimi.The station's transmitter is located at Mount Valin.

The station has an adult contemporary format and is part of the "Rouge FM" network which operates across Quebec and Eastern Ontario.

== History ==
The station received CRTC approval in 1986. CFIX started operations on July 31, 1987 as a sister station to the now-defunct CJMT 1420 with a beautiful music format. The latter closed on September 30, 1994 when the Télémédia network and the Radiomutuel network merged to form the Radiomédia (now Corus Québec) network.

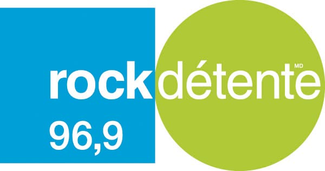
CFIX-FM's last RockDétente-era logo; used from 2004 until August 2011

Up until 1992, CFIX had a beautiful music format. The station switched to adult contemporary and became part of the "RockDétente" network as the station was renamed CFIX Rock-Détente.

In 2004, Astral Media revamped the Rock Détente network with a new logo. This resulted in CFIX Rock-Détente being renamed to simply 96,9 Rock Détente. As such, the station no longer publicly uses its callsign (although the callsign was resurrected on the station ID in 2011).

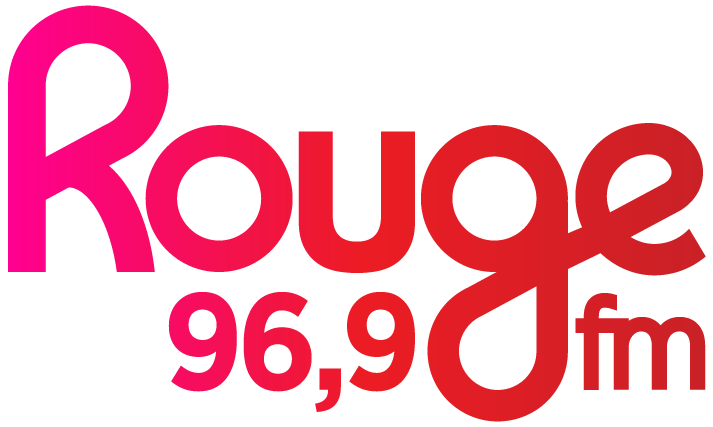
Former Rouge FM logo; used from August 2011 until 2017

On August 18, 2011, at 4:00 p.m. EDT, all "RockDétente" stations, including CFIX, rebranded as Rouge FM.

CFIX was formerly the callsign of a now-defunct AM radio station at 1170 kHz out of Cornwall, Ontario until 1983 when the station went dark due to technical and financial problems.
