= CBJ-FM =

Ici Radio-Canada Première radio station in Quebec

- Saguenay, Quebec; Canada
- Broadcast area: Saguenay–Lac-Saint-Jean
- Frequency: 93.7 MHz

Programming
- Format: News/Talk
- Network: Ici Radio-Canada Première

Ownership
- Owner: Canadian Broadcasting Corporation
- Sister stations: CBJX-FM

History
- First air date: 1933
- Former frequencies: 1120 kHz (1933–1941); 1240 kHz (1941–1947); 1580 kHz (1947–1999)
- Call sign meaning: Canadian Broadcasting Corporation Lac-St-Jean

Technical information
- Licensing authority: CRTC
- Class: B
- ERP: 50,000 watts (horiz.)
- HAAT: 139.7 metres (458 ft)
- Transmitter coordinates: 48.4247°N 71.1083°W

Links
- Website: radio-canada.ca/radio

CBJ-FM (93.7 FM) is a French-language radio station licensed to Saguenay, Quebec, Canada. Owned and operated by the government-owned Canadian Broadcasting Corporation (French: Société Radio-Canada), it has an ad-free news/talk format as part of the Ici Radio-Canada Première network, which operates across Canada.

The station originated in 1933 as CRCS, owned and operated by the CRBC and based in Chicoutimi (which became part of Saguenay in 2002). It became CBJ when the CRBC became the CBC. The station originally operated at 1120 kHz it then moved to 1240 kHz in 1941 and moved again to 1580 kHz in 1947. The station then moved to FM in 1999. The AM signal was a 50,000-watt clear channel station from 1977 onward, and was well known as an extremely reliable DX signal at night. It was often used by people who wanted to receive Première Chaîne when they were travelling just about anywhere in the eastern half of North America. The frequency has been reactivated by CKDO in Oshawa (10,000 watts).

The station's current local programs are Y'a des matins, in the morning from 6:00 a.m. to 9:00 a.m., and Style libre in the afternoon from 3:30 p.m. to 6:00 p.m. The Saturday morning program, Samedi et rien d'autre, originates from CBF-FM in Montreal. On public holidays, its local programs are replaced with local shows airing provincewide produced by different outlets in turn (except Montreal and Quebec City).

== Transmitters ==
Rebroadcasters of CBJ-FM
City of licence	Identifier	Frequency	Power	Class	RECNet	CRTC Decision	Notes
Chibougamau/Chapais	CBJ-FM-1	91.9 FM	30,682 watts	B	Query		49°52′28.92″N 74°22′58.08″W
Dolbeau-Mistassini	CBJ-FM-3	93.1 FM	38,200 watts	B	Query		48°53′11.04″N 72°20′40.92″W
L'Anse-Saint-Jean	CBJ-FM-4	101.9 FM	970 watts	B	Query	84-435; 2003-126	48°9′7.92″N 70°16′59.88″W
Petit-Saguenay	CBJ-FM-5	101.3 FM	250 watts	A1	Query	84-436; 2003-126; 2020-312	48°12′51.84″N 70°4′24.96″W
Saguenay (La Baie)	CBJ-FM-6	102.1 FM	1,138 watts	A	Query	2000-407; 2014-261	48°21′7.92″N 70°53′53.88″W

=== Technical information ===
Because of deficiencies with the main FM signal which did not exist when the station was on AM, in the 2000s CBJ-FM operated a relay, CBJ-FM-6, to serve nearby La Baie, now part of Saguenay. That relay was one of the few co-channel relays used in Canada, meaning that it had also operated on 93.7 MHz; this solution was chosen to permit people to listen to the station in their cars continuously between Chicoutimi and La Baie without having to switch to a new frequency, de facto extending the main signal of CBJ-FM. CBJ-FM-6 used a directional antenna with an average effective radiated power of 16 watts and a peak effective radiated power of 86 watts (class A1). On May 22, 2014, the CRTC approved the CBC's application to change the FM frequency of CBJ-FM-6 La Baie from 93.7 MHz to 102.1 MHz and to increase the maximum ERP from 85.7 to 544 watts. A technical change for CBJ-FM-6 was approved on September 13, 2016, to increase the average effective radiated power (ERP) from 98 to 194 watts (maximum ERP increasing from 544 to 1,138 watts) and by decreasing the effective height of antenna above average terrain from 32.1 to 25.8 metres (105 to 85 ft).

On May 22, 1984, the CRTC approved the CBC's application to add low-power AM transmitters at Petit-Saguenay on 1140 kHz (CBJ-5) and L'Anse-Saint-Jean on 990 kHz (CBJ-4) both with the power of 40 watts. On April 29, 2003, the CBC received approval from the CRTC to convert CBJ-4 L'Anse-Saint-Jean from the AM band (990 kHz) to the FM band at 101.9 MHz. The new transmitter CBJ-FM-4 would replace the AM transmitters CBJ-4 L'Anse-Saint-Jean and CBJ-5 Petit-Saguenay.

On August 27, 2020, the CRTC approved the CBC's application to add a new FM transmitter at Petit-Saguenay. The new transmitter will operate at 101.3 MHz (channel 267A1) with an effective radiated power of 250 watts (non-directional antenna with an effective height of the antenna above average terrain of −196.4 metres (−644 ft). The call sign will be CBJ-FM-5.

CBJ-2 operating at 1140 kHz in Chapais, Quebec located about 40 kilometers from Chibougamau is the last remaining AM transmitter to rebroadcast CBJ-FM. The Chapais transmitter may no longer be needed after the CBC received CRTC approval to increase the power of CBJ-FM-1 Chibougamau from 420 to 30,682 watts, increasing the average ERP from 420 watts to 12,075 watts, replacing the existing non-directional antenna with a new directional elliptically polarized antenna and by decreasing the effective height of the antenna above average terrain from 110.0 to 108.5 metres and changing the transmitter class from A to B.
