= CFRS-DT =

Television station in Saguenay, Quebec

- Saguenay, Quebec; Canada
- Channels: Digital: 13 (VHF); Virtual: 4
- Branding: Noovo

Programming
- Affiliations: Noovo

Ownership
- Owner: Bell Media; (Groupe V Média inc.)
- Sister stations: CFIX-FM, CJAB-FM

History
- First air date: September 7, 1986
- Former call signs: CFRS-TV (1986–2011)
- Former channel numbers: Analog: 4 (VHF, 1986–2011)
- Call sign meaning: CF Radio Saguenay

Technical information
- Licensing authority: CRTC
- ERP: 4.344 kW
- HAAT: 593.8 m (1,948 ft)
- Transmitter coordinates: 48°36′7″N 70°49′48″W

Links
- Website: Noovo

CFRS-DT (channel 4) is a television station in Saguenay, Quebec, Canada, owned and operated by the French-language network Noovo, a division of Bell Media. It is a de facto semi-satellite of Montreal flagship CFJP-DT. CFRS-DT's studios are located on Rue Racine Est (co-located with sister stations CFIX-FM and CJAB-FM) in the former city of Chicoutimi, and its transmitter is located atop Mount Valin. On cable, the station is available on Vidéotron channel 5 and in high-definition on digital channel 605.

== History ==
The station was launched in 1986 by local broadcaster Radio Saguenay, as a sister station of Radio-Canada affiliate CKRS-TV (now Radio-Canada O&O CKTV-DT). Until the creation of the "megacity" of Saguenay in 2002, it was licensed to Jonquière.

Both stations were acquired by Cogeco in 1998, with CFRS becoming a TQS owned-and-operated station in 2001 when Cogeco bought controlling interest in the network. CFRS was part of V's takeover by Remstar in 2008. When TQS rebranded as V on August 31, 2009, CFRS dropped all non-network programming and became a de facto repeater of Montreal-based flagship CFJP-TV.

The station began broadcasting exclusively in digital on September 1, 2011, after receiving authorization from the CRTC.

== Subchannel ==
Subchannel of CFRS-DT
Subchannel	Res.	Short name	Programming
4.1	1080i	CFRS-DT	Noovo
