= CHLP =

Former radio station in Montreal

- Montreal, Quebec; Canada
- Frequency: 1410 kHz

Ownership
- Owner: La Presse

History
- First air date: December 31, 1932
- Last air date: December 15, 1957
- Former frequencies: 1200 kHz (1932–1941); 1490 kHz (1941–1949)

Technical information
- Power: 1,000 watts

CHLP was a French-language Canadian radio station located in Montreal, Quebec which operated from December 31, 1932 to November 15, 1957.

Opened by the now-defunct daily newspaper La Patrie, the station closed shortly after competitor La Presse, which had bought La Patrie in the meantime, transformed that newspaper to a Sunday-only publication. Since La Presse already had its own radio station (namely CKAC), it was felt that CHLP became redundant.

The station obtained its licence on October 28, 1930. It went on the air on December 31, 1932, only twenty minutes before the new year. At the time CHLP operated on 1200 kHz with only 100 watts.

On March 29, 1941, due to the North American Regional Broadcasting Agreement, CHLP moved, like most stations in North America, to a new frequency (1490 kHz in CHLP's case).

The station's power was increased to 250 watts in 1942. Another power increase, this time to 1,000 watts, occurred in 1949, and the frequency was changed to 1410 kHz. The old 1490 kHz frequency was never reassigned in the Montreal area, as the now-defunct CFOX would occupy the neighbouring 1470 kHz frequency starting in 1960.

CHLP started to air some programming in other languages, most notably in Greek, during the 1950s. The station went off the air on November 15, 1957, at midnight.

The 1410 kHz frequency was reactivated on December 21, 1962, when CFMB, a new station, went on the air. CFMB moved to 1280 kHz in 1997; the 1410 frequency was reactivated in 2013 when CJWI relocated from its previous frequency at 1610.
