= CBME-FM =

CBC Radio One station in Montreal, Canada

- Montreal, Quebec; Canada
- Broadcast area: Greater Montreal
- Frequency: 88.5 MHz
- Branding: CBC Radio One

Programming
- Language: English
- Format: News/talk

Ownership
- Owner: Canadian Broadcasting Corporation
- Sister stations: CBM-FM, CBF-FM, CBFX-FM, CBMT-DT, CBFT-DT

History
- First air date: December 11, 1937
- Former call signs: CRCM (1933–1937); CBM (1937–1998)
- Former frequencies: 1060 kHz (AM) (1933–1937); 960 kHz (1937–1941); 940 kHz (1941–1998)
- Call sign meaning: Canadian Broadcasting Corporation Montreal English

Technical information
- Class: C1
- ERP: 11,510 watts average 25,000 watts peak horizontal polarization only
- HAAT: 242.7 metres (796 ft)

Links
- Website: CBC Montreal

CBME-FM is an English-language radio station located in Montreal, Quebec, Canada.

Owned and operated by the government-owned Canadian Broadcasting Corporation, it broadcasts on 88.5 MHz using a directional antenna with an average effective radiated power of 11,510 watts and a peak effective radiated power of 25,000 watts (class B) from a transmitter atop Mount Royal.

The station has a commercial-free news/talk format and is part of the CBC Radio One network which operates across Canada. Like all CBC Radio One stations, but unlike most FM stations, it broadcasts in mono. Some local shows and newscasts produced at CBME-FM are also heard on a chain of stations across Quebec.

Its studios and offices, along with those of sister stations CBM-FM, CBF-FM and CBFX-FM are located at the Nouvelle Maison de Radio-Canada at 1000 Papineau Avenue. Master control is at the Canadian Broadcasting Centre in Toronto.

== History ==
The station was launched in 1933 on 1050 AM and was originally known as CRCM, operated by the Canadian Radio Broadcasting Commission. When ownership was transferred to the CBC in 1937, the station call sign became CBM and the frequency was changed to 960. On March 29, 1941, like most radio stations in North America, CBM moved to 940. Originally 5,000 watts, CBM's power was increased to 50,000 watts, the maximum power permitted by the CRTC for AM stations.

Prior to 1978, CBM broadcast from a transmitter site near Marieville. In 1978 the CBC consolidated its two AM transmitters for Montreal at a site in Brossard, on the south shore of Montreal.

Former CBC Radio One logo used until 2018

The AM transmitter allowed CBM to be heard across most of the eastern half of North America at night, including much of Eastern Canada. However, it was difficult to hear in some parts of Montreal during the day. To solve the problem, CBM got permission to move to 88.5 FM on July 4, 1997. The FM transmitter went on the air in 1998, and the AM transmitter was shut down in May 1999, four months after French-language sister station CBF, which got permission to move to FM at the same time and which shared CBM's transmitter site in Brossard, shut down its own AM transmitter on 690 kHz. The 940 outlet is a Class A clear-channel station which is nulled slightly in the direction of Mexico City to protect the other Class A station on 940, XEQ-AM.

The call sign change to CBME-FM occurred in order to distinguish the station from sister station CBM-FM.

== Local programming ==
The station's local programs are Daybreak Montreal (hosted by Sean Henry) in the morning and Let's Go (hosted by Sabrina Marandola) in the afternoon. The station also produces the Quebec edition of Radio Noon, which airs on all Radio One transmitters throughout the province.

The station also broadcasts All in a Weekend on Saturday and Sunday mornings, and Cinq à Six on Saturdays.

== Transmitters ==
CBM once operated a large network of repeaters across the eastern two-thirds of Quebec. However, most of those repeaters were transferred to the license of CBVE-FM in Quebec City when it became a separate station in 1994.

Because of deficiencies with the main FM signal which did not exist when the station was on AM, CBME-FM added FM rebroadcasting transmitters with directional antennas in the western part of Montreal (98 watts, from the corner of Cavendish and Sherbrooke Streets in Notre-Dame-de-Grâce) and in Cowansville (2,700 watts).

Rebroadcasters of CBME-FM
City of licence	Identifier	Frequency	Power	Class	RECNet	CRTC Decision	Notes
Cowansville	CBMG-FM	101.9 FM	2,700 watts	B1	Query	2002-128	45°7′36.12″N 72°38′53.88″W
Montreal (Notre-Dame-de-Grâce)	CBME-FM-1	104.7 FM	98 watts	A1	Query	2003-196	45°27′48.96″N 73°37′45.84″W

The call sign CBME was formerly used for a low-power AM repeater in La Tuque which changed to CBVE-1.
