= CBJX-FM =

Radio station in Saguenay, Quebec, Canada

- Saguenay, Quebec; Canada
- Frequency: 100.9 MHz

Programming
- Language: French
- Format: Public Music
- Network: Ici Musique

Ownership
- Owner: Canadian Broadcasting Corporation
- Sister stations: CBJ-FM

History
- First air date: 1974
- Former call signs: CBJ-FM (1974–1999)

Technical information
- Class: B
- ERP: 50 kWs horizontal polarization only
- HAAT: 137.6 metres (451 ft)

Links
- Website: ICI Musique

CBJX-FM is a French language radio station located in Saguenay, Quebec, Canada.

Owned and operated by the Canadian Broadcasting Corporation, it broadcasts on 100.9 MHz with an effective radiated power of 50,000 watts (class B) using an omnidirectional antenna.

The station has an ad-free music format featuring mostly classical music, jazz, world music and also other genres. It is part of the Ici Musique network (previously known, from 2004 to 2014 as Espace musique; and before September 2004, as La Chaîne culturelle when the format was more focused on classical music), which operates across Canada.

The station's call sign used to be CBJ-FM until 1999. At that time, that call sign started to be used by its sister station CBJ as it moved to FM; that station got the call sign CBJ-FM, and the old CBJ-FM thus had to change its own call sign.

CBJX-FM also has a rebroadcast transmitter in Dolbeau-Mistassini at 90.9 FM, located at 48°53′11.04″N 72°20′40.92″W.
