= CBF-FM =

Ici Radio-Canada Première station in Montreal

- Montreal, Quebec; Canada
- Broadcast area: Greater Montreal area (Includes Laval, Montérégie, Laurentides and Lanaudière)
- Frequency: 95.1 MHz (HD Radio)

Programming
- Language: French
- Format: News/Talk
- Subchannels: HD2: Ici Musique Classique
- Network: Ici Radio-Canada Première

Ownership
- Owner: Canadian Broadcasting Corporation
- Sister stations: CBFX-FM, CBM-FM, CBME-FM, CBMT-DT, CBFT-DT

History
- First air date: December 11, 1937
- Former call signs: CBF (1937–1998)
- Former frequencies: 910 kHz (1937–1941); 690 kHz (1941–1998)
- Call sign meaning: Canadian Broadcasting Corporation French

Technical information
- Licensing authority: CRTC
- Class: C1
- ERP: 100,000 watts
- HAAT: 298.9 metres (981 ft)
- Transmitter coordinates: 45.5056°N 73.5917°W

Links
- Website: ici.radio-canada.ca/ohdio/premiere

CBF-FM (95.1 FM) is a French-language radio station licensed to Montreal, Quebec, Canada.

Owned and operated by the government-owned Canadian Broadcasting Corporation, it transmits from the Mount Royal candelabra tower with an effective radiated power of 100,000 watts (class C1) using an omnidirectional antenna. Its studios and master control are located at Maison Radio-Canada in Montreal.

The station has a non-commercial news/talk format and is the flagship of the Ici Radio-Canada Première network which operates across Canada. Like all Première stations, but unlike most FM stations, it broadcasts in mono. In the summer of 2018, CBF-FM started to broadcast in FM multiplex.

== History ==
CBF went on the air on December 11, 1937, as the CBC launched its French-language network, known as Radio-Canada. CBF operated on 910 using 50,000 watts full-time with an omnidirectional antenna as a clear channel Class I-A station. The transmitter was located in Contrecoeur.

The station moved to 690 on March 29, 1941, as a result of the North American Regional Broadcasting Agreement. In 1978, the CBC consolidated its two Montréal AM broadcast transmitters and the station moved to a new transmitter site shared with CBM in Brossard (Now known as CBME-FM on 88.5 FM).

CBF started to broadcast from Maison Radio-Canada in November 1971. Commercial advertising on the station was eliminated in 1974 except for Montreal Canadiens NHL hockey games. (CBF was the Canadiens' radio flagship since its opening in 1937 and would remain so until 1997.)

CBF applied to move to FM and was authorized to do so by the CRTC on July 4, 1997. The AM signal covered much of the western half of Quebec, and was strong enough to be heard in Ottawa and the National Capital Region, as well as parts of New York State and Vermont. Indeed, until CBOF signed on in 1964, CBF doubled as the Radio-Canada outlet for Ottawa as well. Its nighttime signal covered most of the eastern half of North America, including much of Eastern Canada. However, radio frequency interference rendered it almost unlistenable in parts of Montreal during the day, which prompted the decision to move the station to the FM dial.

The FM transmitter was put on the air ahead of schedule on January 22, 1998, and initially had special programming targeting people affected by the 1998 Ice Storm (i.e., people without electricity). The AM signal was shut down on January 21, 1999. (English-language sister station CBM got permission to move to FM and started FM operations at the same time, retaining its AM signal until May 14, 1999.) CBF became CBF-FM when it moved to the FM dial. The existing station with the CBF-FM callsign at 100.7 MHz was renamed CBFX-FM. The station's old home at 690 was taken over by CKVL, which moved from 850 under the new callsign CINF. That station closed down in 2010, and the frequency remained dark until 2012, when English-language sports station CKGM moved there.

To improve reception, CBF was authorized to increase its power from 17,030 watts to 100,000 watts on June 2, 2000. The power increase was implemented in mid-2001.

In recent years the popularity of the station has increased significantly. The station is now usually one of the top five stations in Bureau of Broadcast Measurement ratings (using shares), after decades of being an also-ran.

On September 27, 2018, CBF-FM began broadcasting in HD Radio for compatible receivers, with its second digital radio subchannel offering ICI Musique Classique, a digital-only music feed.

== Transmitters ==
Rebroadcasters of CBF-FM
City of licence	Identifier	Frequency	Power	Class	RECNet	CRTC Decision	Notes
Radisson	CBF-FM-7	100.1 FM	199 watts	A	Query		53°45′25.92″N 77°33′20.16″W
Mont-Laurier	CBF-FM-9	91.9 FM	38,000 watts	B	Query	85-523	46°33′34.92″N 75°42′16.92″W
Mont-Tremblant	CBF-FM-14	95.5 FM	835 watts	A	Query		46°7′23.16″N 74°38′18.96″W
Rivière-Rouge	CBF-FM-15	88.3 FM	4,600 watts	B	Query		46°23′44.16″N 74°53′7.08″W
Saint-Donat	CBF-FM-20	89.7 FM	5,460 watts	B	Query	2008-280	46°20′35.16″N 74°12′25.92″W
Saint-Michel-des-Saints	CBF-FM-13	90.9 FM	466 watts	A	Query		46°35′56.04″N 73°54′2.16″W

On October 17, 1986 the CRTC approved the CBC's application to change CBF-3's frequency from 1400 to 650 kHz. (Now part of CHLM-FM).

CBF-FM-10 in Sherbrooke and CBF-FM-8 in Trois-Rivières were once full satellites of CBF, but began airing some local programming in 1998. They have both been licensed as full-fledged stations since 2000, despite still having rebroadcaster-like call signs. Both stations have their own local programs and news bulletins; otherwise, their schedules are similar to CBF.

On July 5, 2010, the CBC applied to decrease the effective radiated power of CBF-20, and also on the same date, the CBC also applied to broadcast, on the rebroadcasting transmitters CBF-16, CBF-17 and CBF-18, the programming of CBF-8 instead of the programming of CBF. All technical parameters of the rebroadcasters would remain unchanged.

On July 29, 2010, the CRTC approved the application to transfer transmitters CBF-1, CBF-3 and CBF-4 from CBF to CHLM-FM Rouyn-Noranda.

On October 30, 2012, the CBC received approval to change the source of programming from CBF to CBFG-FM Chisasibi on the following repeaters: CBFA-1 Manawan, CBFA-2 Obedjiwan, CBFW Wemindji, CBFM Mistissini, CBFA-3 Wemotaci, CBFH Waskaganish and CBFV Waswanipi.

=== Sirius XM ===
As of 2015, the entirety of CBF's schedule is broadcast live throughout North America via SiriusXM Canada on channel 170. In effect, CBF is one of only two terrestrial stations in North America to be broadcast on Sirius XM, and the only one broadcast using the same feed as the local station (WBBR in New York City; is the only other station, though any local commercials are replaced with national commercials and promos).
