= Media in the Fraser Valley =

This is a list of media in the Fraser Valley, British Columbia. Due to its proximity to Vancouver, most TV and radio broadcasters in that city are also received throughout the valley, although as noted below in a few cases there are repeater stations licensed to different centres in the region. See Media in Vancouver for other media outlets not listed below.

Some stations from Seattle, Washington, USA are also received in the Fraser Valley due to its close proximity to the border.

== Radio ==
Frequency	Call sign	Branding	Format	Owner	Notes
FM 88.1	VF2522		tourist information	Cameron Bell Consultancy	licensed to Chilliwack
FM 88.5	CBU-1-FM	CBC Radio One	news/talk	Canadian Broadcasting Corporation	licensed to Abbotsford
FM 89.5	CHWK-FM	89.5 JR Country	Country	Jim Pattison Group	licensed to Chilliwack
FM 91.7	CBYF-FM	CBC Radio One	news/talk	Canadian Broadcasting Corporation	licensed to Chilliwack
FM 92.5	CKKS-FM-1	Kiss Radio	Contemporary hit radio	Rogers Media	licensed to Abbotsford
FM 96.7	CBYH-FM	CBC Radio One	news/talk	Canadian Broadcasting Corporation	licensed to Harrison Hot Springs
FM 98.3	CKSR-FM	98.3 Star FM	Adult contemporary	Rogers Media	licensed to Chilliwack
FM 99.9	CBU-FM-7	CBC Music	public music	Canadian Broadcasting Corporation	licensed to Chilliwack
FM 100.5	CFSR-FM	98.3 Star FM	Adult contemporary	Rogers Media	licensed to Hope
FM 101.7	CIVL-FM	CiVL Radio	campus radio	University of the Fraser Valley	licensed to Abbotsford
FM 101.7	CBUE-FM	CBC Radio One	news/talk	Canadian Broadcasting Corporation	licensed to Hope
FM 102.1	CBUF-FM-1	Ici Radio-Canada Première	news/talk	Canadian Broadcasting Corporation	licensed to Chilliwack
FM 107.1	CKQC-FM	Country 107.1	Country	Rogers Media	licensed to Abbotsford
FM 107.5	CKKS-FM	Kiss Radio	Contemporary hit radio	Rogers Media	licensed to Chilliwack

== Television ==
The Fraser Valley is counted as part of the Vancouver television market, and most Vancouver stations are easily receivable in the area.

OTA channel	Call sign	Network	City of license
11	CHAN-TV-1	Global	Chilliwack
19	CFEG-TV	independent	Abbotsford
47 (66.1)	CHNU-DT	Joytv	Fraser Valley

== Print ==
- Abbotsford News
- Chilliwack Progress
- Mission City Record
- Maple Ridge News
- Hope Standard
- Agassiz Harrison Observer
- Vancouver's two dailies, the Vancouver Sun and Vancouver Province are also available throughout the valley.

== Online ==
- Abbotsford Today
- chillTV
- Fraser Valley Current
- TheValleyVoice.ca
- Fraservalleytoday.ca (formerly MyChilliwackNews.com)
- AbbyNews.com
- TheProgress.com
- MissionCityRecord.com
- HopeStandard.com
- AgassizHarrisonObserver.com
