= CKMI-DT =

Television station in Montreal

- Montreal, Quebec (Note: Originally licensed to Quebec City, Quebec; moved to Montreal in 2009.); Canada
- Channels: Digital: 15 (UHF); Virtual: 15
- Branding: Global Montreal

Programming
- Affiliations: Global

Ownership
- Owner: Corus Entertainment; (Corus Television Limited Partnership)

History
- First air date: March 17, 1957
- Former call signs: CKMI-TV (1957–2009); CKMI-TV-1 (2009–2011)
- Former channel numbers: Analog: 5 (VHF, 1957–1997, Quebec City), 46 (UHF, 1997–2011, Montreal); Digital: 46 (UHF, 2011–2020)
- Former affiliations: CBC (1957–1997)

Technical information
- Licensing authority: CRTC
- ERP: 8 kW
- HAAT: 298 m (978 ft)
- Transmitter coordinates: 45°30′20″N 73°35′30″W
- Repeater: see § Transmitters

Links
- Website: Global Montreal

CKMI-DT (channel 15) is a television station in Montreal, Quebec, Canada, owned and operated by the Global Television Network, a division of Corus Entertainment. The station maintains studios inside the Dominion Square Building in downtown Montreal. Its primary transmitter is located atop Mount Royal, with rebroadcasters in Quebec City and Sherbrooke.

CKMI was established as Quebec City's second station in 1957. Originally a private affiliate of the CBC Television network, it was a sister station to that city's Radio-Canada affiliate, CFCM-TV. It remained a CBC affiliate after CFCM disaffiliated from Radio-Canada and eventually joined the private French network TVA. A series of ownership changes over the years eventually saw CKMI and CFCM acquired by Télé-Metropole, owner of TVA flagship CFTM-TV, in 1989.

Unlike its francophone sister, CKMI struggled to survive for most of its first four decades. This was mainly because it was the only anglophone station in the overwhelmingly francophone city, and its potential audience was barely large enough for it to be viable. In 1997, Canwest bought controlling interest in CKMI and relaunched it as a regional Global station for Quebec with rebroadcasters in Montreal and Sherbrooke. The station moved most of its operations to Montreal that year, though it would nominally remain licensed to Quebec City until 2009. The move fulfilled Global's quarter-century dream of getting a foothold in Montreal. It also gave Canwest's stations enough coverage of Canada that it rebranded its station group as the Global Television Network. The station's local news broadcasts have typically struggled in the ratings, never advancing beyond a distant second place.

== History ==
=== MI-5 in Quebec City ===
The station launched on March 17, 1957, and was the second privately owned station in Quebec. It was licensed to Quebec City and aired an analog signal on VHF channel 5. CKMI was originally owned by Télévision de Québec, a consortium of cinema chain Famous Players and Quebec City's three privately owned radio stations, CHRC, CKCV and CJQC, along with the province's first private station, CFCM-TV. The station's studios were located alongside CFCM's facilities in Sainte-Foy, then a suburb of Quebec City; CKMI and CFCM shared the same antenna, the first setup of its kind in the world for television. This allowed CKMI to sign on several months sooner than would have been the case under the normal engineering practices of the time and at a fraction of the cost.

Upon signing on, CKMI became Quebec City's CBC Television affiliate, taking all English-language programming from CFCM. Télévision de Québec had applied for an English-language station when a policy change at the CBC the previous year restricted CFCM to programming from CBC's French-language network, Radio-Canada (now Ici Radio-Canada Télé), rather than selecting French- and English-language shows, as it had done since signing on in 1954. CFCM disaffiliated from Radio-Canada in 1964 when the network opened its own station, CBVT, but CKMI remained with CBC. In 1971, CFCM became a charter affiliate of a privately owned French network, TVA.

Télévision de Québec was nearly forced to sell its stations in 1969 due to the Canadian Radio and Television Commission's (CRTC) new rules requiring radio and television stations to be 80% Canadian-owned. The largest shareholder, Famous Players, was a subsidiary of American film studio Paramount Pictures. The CRTC had additionally denied a 1968 bid to sell CFCM and CKMI to Teltron Communications Ltd. In 1970, the CRTC ordered Télévision de Québec to present a plan for restructuring its ownership in accordance with the law or else it would take bids for replacement licensees. As a result, Famous Players reduced its shares to 20 percent by selling off to three Quebec City firms, allowing Télévision de Québec to keep CKMI and CFCM. The company renamed itself Télé-Capitale in 1972. Télé-Capitale was bought in two phases by La Verendrye Management Corporation in 1979 and 1982; citing a high debt load, the firm sold the businesses to the Pathonic Corporation of Montreal in 1984. The firm then became known as the Pathonic Network in 1986 before being purchased by Télé-Metropole (which changed its name to TVA) in 1989 and 1990.

When there is somebody being interviewed who speaks English, the French reporters at CFCM don't ask English questions.

— Karen McDonald, host of Inside Quebec, CKMI-TV's only local program by 1996

CKMI faced severe financial problems for much of its history as a CBC affiliate. This was largely because the area's anglophone population was just barely large enough for the station to be viable as a privately owned CBC affiliate; Quebec City, unlike Montreal, is a virtually monolingual francophone city. As early as 1962, during hearings before the Board of Broadcast Governors (forerunner of the CRTC) for a new French-language station in Quebec City, BBG counsel William Pearson described CKMI as one of the most unprofitable stations in the country. During licence renewal hearings in 1972, Télé-Capitale noted to the CRTC that it was keeping CKMI-TV going despite the lack of any path to profitability. This stood in contrast to its French-language sister station, CFCM, which was reported in 1973 to be the most profitable television station in Canada.

In the early 1980s, CKMI's newsroom consisted of three anchor-reporters who produced three hours of local content a week. They were the only English speakers at CFCM-CKMI. Unless they were talking among themselves, they spoke French most of the day at work before going to air, reflected in the numerous gallicisms that pocked CKMI's newscasts. Indeed, CKMI's reporters often struggled to find anyone who could speak English well enough to conduct an interview.

There were so few viewers that one CRTC licence renewal hearing for the station was met with no public comment whatsoever. At one point in 1981, its highest-rated program attracted only 31,000 viewers, a fraction of the viewership of CFCM's highest-rated program. It was not unheard of for French-language commercials originally produced for CFCM to air on CKMI when it was deemed too expensive to produce a separate English commercial. Despite the difficulties of running an English station in a city that was 97 per cent francophone at the time, Télé-Capitale had no qualms about keeping the station on the air, viewing it as a public service to Quebec City's anglophone community.

Over the years, the station served mostly as a semi-satellite of CBMT in Montreal, with CBC programming taking up 85 percent of the schedule by the 1980s. The only local program on the air by 1996 was a 30-minute weeknight newscast anchored by Karen McDonald, editor and co-owner of the Quebec Chronicle-Telegraph, the only English-language newspaper in the city. Many stories on the newscast, Inside Quebec, were in French because they were supplied by CFCM's newsroom; McDonald, who left the Chronicle-Telegraph to work for the station known as "MI-5" before also returning to the newspaper four years later, recalled that CFCM's reporters did not ask questions in English even when they were interviewing an anglophone. In the late 1980s, the newscast only attracted 5,000 viewers per statistics from the Bureau of Broadcast Measurement; McDonald believed that most of those viewers were francophones.

=== Becoming a Global station ===
On June 13, 1995, Télé-Métropole and CanWest Global Communications announced a plan that would transform CKMI from a de facto rebroadcaster of CBMT into the third major English-language TV service in the province, providing the first private competition to CFCF-TV. Under the plan, Télé-Métropole and CanWest would form a joint venture, TVA CanWest, that would own CKMI, and it would apply to build transmitters in Montreal and Sherbrooke. CanWest would own a 51 percent controlling interest in the venture. Because of the nature of the Quebec City market and Montreal being one of Global's two major coverage gaps of the time (the other being Alberta, where it had affiliated stations), it was immediately evident that the primary goal of the venture was to get Global a foothold in Montreal, the country's third-largest anglophone market. According to Mike Boone, the television columnist for The Gazette, CanWest would have stood virtually no chance of getting a licence for a Quebec station on its own and joined forces with Télé-Métropole to lend "local clout" to its bid.

Global had spent almost a quarter-century trying to get a transmitter in Montreal. When the network originally launched in 1974 as an Ontario-based network, original plans called for a transmitter in Maxville, near Cornwall. While it would have primarily served Hawkesbury, it would have provided a strong grade B signal to Montreal. However, the CRTC did not approve the Maxville transmitter with the others because it had previously issued a moratorium on new TV stations in Montreal. One columnist noted that language and political considerations meant the CRTC would not entertain such a service before Montreal had three French-language TV stations.

The TVA CanWest deal would take some time to be approved because of another proposed transaction. CFCF and Vidéotron had proposed an asset swap that would have given CFCF control of TVA and TQS while leaving all of Montreal's cable systems with the latter company, and the CRTC announced it wanted to hear that proposal first. That logjam was resolved in April 1996, when Vidéotron acquired all of CFCF with an eye to spinning off its English-language holdings. It would not be until December of that year when the CRTC finally heard the CKMI application. TVA CanWest pledged a commitment of $165 million over seven years on new Canadian programming to the regulator if it won in Quebec City and proposed new stations for Calgary and Edmonton. Ahead of the hearings, CFCF vigorously fought the proposal, claiming any competition would reduce its value and jeopardize its community service initiatives; it called into question any pledge to produce regional programming, with CFCF weatherman Don McGowan noting that Quebec City was "where 42 anglophones live today". A full-page newspaper ad from CFCF blasted the idea of Global being "allowed to slip through the back door" into Montreal, ominously threatening that it would mean "no more CFCF 12 as we know it".

In November, the CRTC ruled against Global's Alberta stations bid. At the hearing the next month, Izzy Asper took the CRTC to task, noting that English-speaking Montrealers were higher-than-average viewers of American stations available on cable. The CRTC approved the CKMI Global bid on February 27, 1997; on the same day, it also approved Vidéotron's purchase of CFCF's business contingent on spinning off the English-language stations and TQS. As a condition of the purchase, CKMI could not air local advertising in Montreal. CFCF and the CBC had claimed Montreal's anglophone population was so small that a third English-language station would cripple their advertising revenue.

Over the course of 1997, changes were made in preparation for CKMI's relaunch. In Quebec City, CKMI would move from channel 5 to 20, to permit the CBC to take over the channel 5 facility for CBVE-TV, a full-time repeater of CBMT. (Note: Following the digital transition in 2011, this station relocated to channel 11, using CBVT's old analog frequency and transmitter atop Mount Bélair; CBVE-TV would close on July 31, 2012, along with most CBC rebroadcasters due to the CBC's budget cuts.) The Montreal transmitter, originally assigned channel 67, was changed to 46. With the addition of CKMI, CanWest's station group, the CanWest Global System, would have over-the-air coverage in every province except Newfoundland. This led CanWest to announce that on August 18, it would rebrand its stations as the Global Television Network.

=== Global era ===
On September 14, 1997, CKMI formally disaffiliated from CBC and joined Global. Full-time programming on the Sherbrooke and Montreal transmitters began on the same day. CKMI also picked up a number of popular American shows that had been purchased by CFCF, but whose Canadian rights were owned by CanWest. The American shows lost half or more of their audience with the move to Global. The Montreal rebroadcaster was criticized for poor reception and a low effective radiated power: 4.85 kW, compared to 697 and 1,334 kW at the two other UHF stations in the city. As a result, in April 1998, the effective radiated power was increased to 33,000 watts. An attempt in 2001 to obtain rights to air local advertising in Quebec City was rejected after objections from CFCF. In 2002, Global bought out TVA's remaining interest in CKMI.

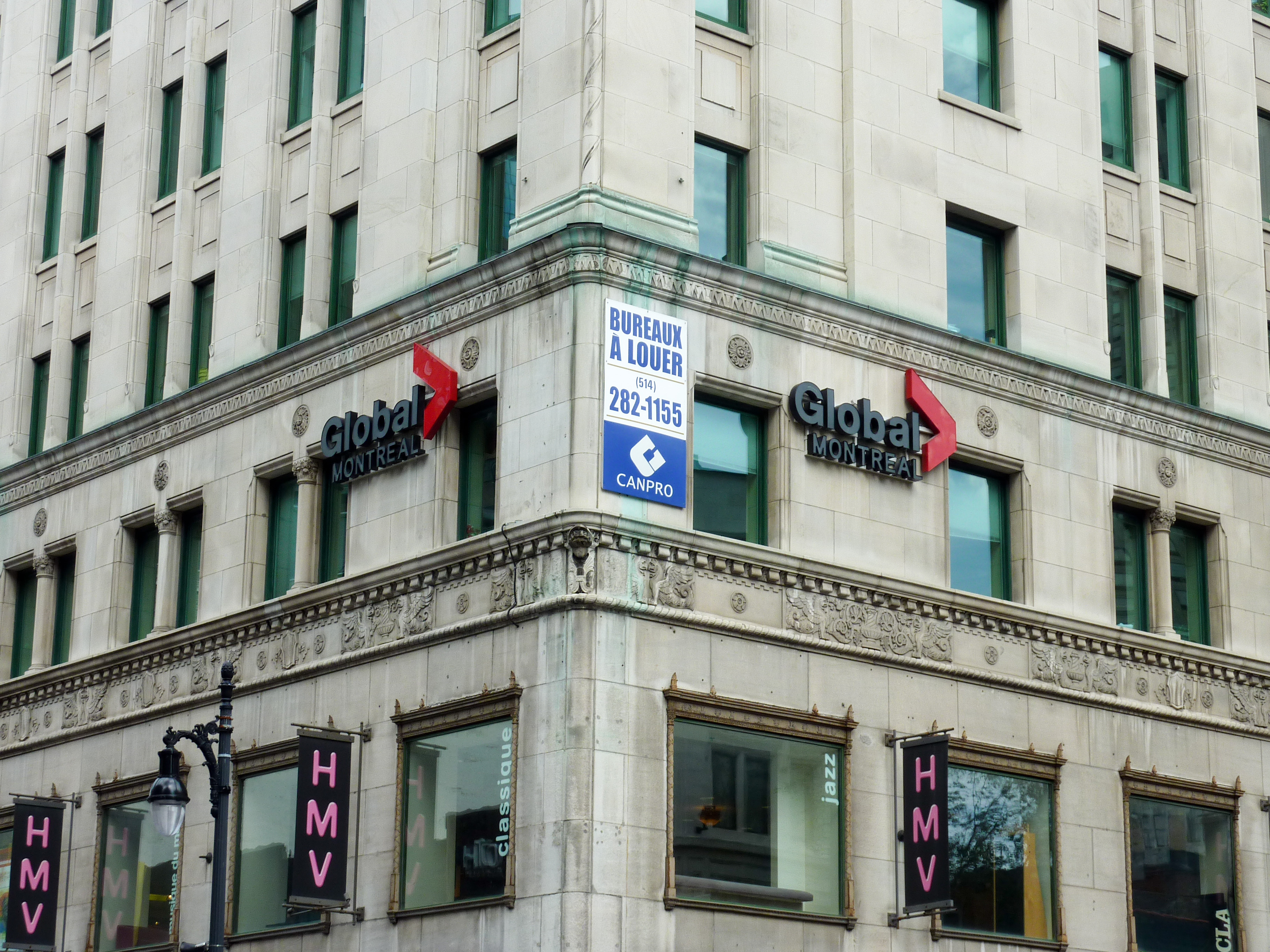
The studios of Global Montreal in the Dominion Square Building at the corner of Peel Street and Saint Catherine Street in Downtown Montreal.

The station shifted most of its operations, as well as the focus of its news coverage, to Montreal soon after the launch of the Montreal transmitter; however, it remained licensed to Quebec City, and its official main studio remained in Sainte-Foy. Over the course of the 2000s, Global cut back its presence in Quebec City and the Eastern Townships, leaving its Sherbrooke bureau unstaffed before closing it altogether in 2007. In 2009, reflecting what had already occurred in the preceding years, the CRTC permitted CKMI to move its licence to Montreal, which also allowed the station to access local advertising in Montreal for the first time; the station changed its name from Global Quebec to Global Montreal at that time. CKMI's main production facilities and news operations then relocated from a building shared with TVA on De Maisonneuve Boulevard East in Montreal to the Dominion Square Building, home of The Gazette, in Downtown Montreal.

On October 27, 2010, Shaw Communications completed its purchase of Canwest's television assets, including CKMI and the other Global stations, after Canwest had entered into creditor bankruptcy protection in late 2009. As a result, Canwest's former television division became Shaw Media. In 2016, the Global stations, along with the rest of Shaw Media, were sold to sister company Corus Entertainment. The CRTC treated this as a corporate reorganization rather than an ownership change. In approving the transaction, the CRTC noted that Corus and Shaw shared a common de facto owner in Shaw founder JR Shaw and treated the two companies as "a single voice" under the CRTC's rules on diversity of ownership.

== News operation ==
Global entered the Montreal news market in direct competition with CFCF and its highly rated Pulse newscasts. Benoît Aubin of TVA was tapped as the first news director for Global in Quebec, and Heather Hiscox was the first anchor for Global's supper-hour local news, which aired at 5:30 p.m. to contrast with the 6 p.m. Pulse. Reflecting the regional architecture of CKMI, the station originally had four reporters in Quebec City and one in the Eastern Townships. Mike Boone, television critic for the Montreal Gazette, criticized the newscast's lack of time for stories and felt that it was hampered by needing to provide regional stories not of much interest to Montreal.

In December 1997, CKMI debuted a daily entertainment magazine, Global Tonight, hosted by Jamie Orchard. However, in June, it axed those programs and its 11 p.m. news and sports programs, moving its evening news to 6 p.m. and reallocating resources to the creation of a longform morning show. The morning show, This Morning Live, debuted in 1998. It was another four years before Global began producing a late newscast again in Quebec. This Morning Live was canceled after a decade in 2008.

As part of Shaw Communications's offer to take over Canwest's television assets, Shaw promised to launch local morning newscasts on several Global stations, including CKMI. On January 28, 2013, CKMI-DT launched a three-hour weekday morning newscast, airing from 6 to 9 a.m.

While Global had gradually been introducing centralized newscast technical production, in 2015, it began to present entire local newscasts for Montreal from Toronto. Beginning that August, weekend newscasts were produced remotely from Toronto. Global Montreal also introduced a half-hour noon newscast, and extended its evening news to an hour.

As of May 2017, Global Montreal's 5:30 p.m. supper-time newscast ranked second in the Montreal English TV market, with 28,000 viewers tuning in compared to CTV Montreal's 189,000 viewers and CBC Montreal's 27,000 viewers. Although CKMI was still far behind CFCF, its viewership numbers had risen significantly since 2011, when it finished at the bottom of the ratings with only 6,900 viewers and a three percent share.

In August 2020, evening anchor Jamie Orchard was laid off. In September 2020, CKMI cancelled Focus Montreal and replaced Orchard with Tracy Tong, who anchors from Toronto; this left only the morning newscast as being presented from Montreal.

On September 6, 2022, presentation of the 5:30 and 6:30 p.m. newscasts returned to the Montreal studio after the station named Aalia Adam the new anchor of Global News at 5:30 and Global News at 6:30; Adam also anchors newscasts for the Maritimes.

=== Notable former on-air staff ===
- Heather Hiscox – news anchor
- Don McGowan – staff announcer and sports reporter (1958–1959)
- Leslie Roberts – anchor
- Jamie Orchard – weeknight anchor

== Technical information ==
=== Subchannel ===
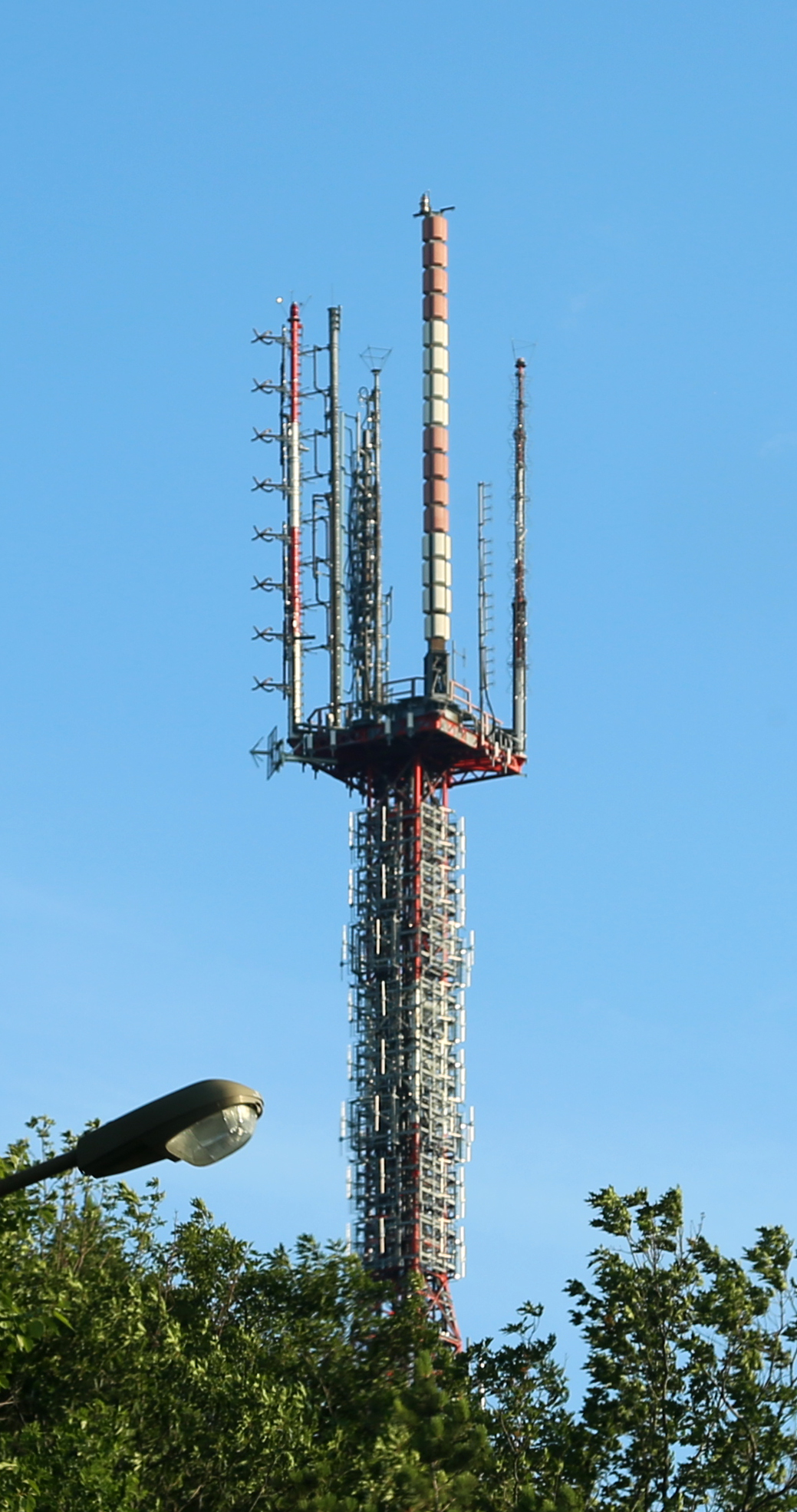
The Mount Royal television tower in Montreal. The arm with the panel antennas (front right) transmits UHF television, including CKMI.

Subchannel of CKMI-DT
Subchannel	Res.	Short name	Programming
15.1	1080i	CKMI-HD	Global

=== Analog-to-digital conversion ===
In August 2011, CKMI converted all three of its transmitters to digital ahead of the conversion deadline of August 31. The main transmitter, CKMI-DT-1, began broadcasting its digital signal on UHF channel 15.

== Transmitters ==
Semi-satellites are in bold italics.

Rebroadcasters of CKMI-DT
Station	City of licence	Digital channel	Virtual channel	ERP	HAAT	Transmitter coordinates
CKMI-DT	Quebec City	20 (UHF)	20.1	18 kW	446.3 m (1,464 ft)	46°49′21″N 71°29′43″W
CKMI-DT-2	Sherbrooke	10 (VHF)	15.1	1.0 kW	613.1 m (2,011 ft)	45°18′43″N 72°14′30″W
