= CHWK =

CHWK may refer to:

- CHWK-FM, a radio station (89.5 FM) licensed to Chilliwack, British Columbia, Canada
- CKSR-FM, a radio station (98.3 FM) licensed to Chilliwack, British Columbia, Canada, which held the call sign CHWK from 1927 to 2000
