= Soirée canadienne =

- Genre: Folklore
- Directed by: Gary Longchamps; Lucien Albert; Jean Collard
- Presented by: Louis Bilodeau
- Country of origin: Canada
- Original language: French
- No. of seasons: 23
- No. of episodes: 888 or 985

Production
- Running time: 30 minutes (1960-1961); 60 minutes

Original release
- Network: CHLT; Télé-Métropole
- Release: 10 September 1960 – 28 May 1983

Soirée canadienne (Canadian Evening), was a weekly variety television show which aired Saturday nights on Télé-7 (CHLT – Sherbrooke) and Télé-Métropole in Quebec. The show was hosted by Louis Bilodeau for 23 seasons from 1960 to 1983.

Since 2006, reruns of the show have aired on a specialty channel called Prise 2.

== Concept ==
Soirée canadienne had the goal of showcasing the folklore of Quebec. In a TV set decorated like a rural Quebec home, the producers recreated the world of the old days, featuring folk songs (chant à répondre), jigs, rigaudons, and musical numbers performed by guests who all came from the same place; every episode was produced in honour of a specific village. The show was created by Pierre Bruneau, Gary Longchamps, and Louis Bilodeau, for CHLT in Sherbrooke.

The original concept came from the radio show Fête au village, created by Radio-Canada, which had been directed by Roland Lelièvre and Paul Legendre. Soirée canadienne added its own spin to the formula by inviting performers from a different municipality every week, at first just from Estrie, and then from throughout Quebec in later seasons.

At the beginning of each episode, the MC would travel from Sherbrooke on a bus to pick up his audience members, and then on the return trip he would hold an audition to choose the performers to be featured on the show.

Starting in the second season (1961–1962), a short film would present the history of the village that had been honoured that week. This segment was retired during the last season in 1982–1983.

== Production ==
The first episode of Soirée canadienne, on September 10, 1960, showcased the town of Danville, near Asbestos. During the first season the show was directed by Gary Longchamps and lasted 30 minutes. The length was extended to 60 minutes in September 1969. It began to be produced in colour in September 1966.

At first the show was only broadcast by CHLT, in the Eastern Townships, Beauce, and Mauricie, but gradually it was picked up by other channels. Soirée canadienne was first broadcast in Quebec City by CFCM-TV on Mondays starting in June 1970, then in Rivière-du-Loup, Rimouski and Chicoutimi. In Summer 1971, Radio-Canada broadcast the show on Wednesday evenings in Montreal and Ottawa. After this it was available in Montreal through Cable television. Starting from 1972 the show was also picked up by WMUR-TV in Manchester, New Hampshire. Soirée canadienne was therefore the first French-language program produced in Quebec to be shown on foreign television.

Soirée canadienne was said to be the highest rated show ever produced by CHLT. In 1969 it had more viewers than La Soirée du hockey, in the station's broadcast zone

Episodes were created in this manner: Louis Bilodeau, the MC, would make an expedition to many villages in a given region. In each of these villages he would assign someone to be a recruiter to find local artists for the show. On the broadcast day everyone selected to appear on the program, including the mayor and the local priest, would got to the CHLT studio in Sherbrooke, where the show would be recorded after an afternoon spent rehearsing. It wasn't hard to find participants, given the show's prestige and the competition between villages to be featured.

Between 888 and 915 episodes were produced over the show's 23 seasons, and nearly 1300 towns and villages were featured. The folklorist Jean-Léo Collard (1936–2021) was one of the show's directors from 1967 to 1976.

The 500th episode, broadcast on March 10, 1973, was a gala held at the Palais des sports de Sherbrooke before an audience of 6500 people. This episode featured a competition to crown Quebec's best best fiddler, chansons à répondre singers, Quadrille dance troupe, and traditional music group. The jury was led by Gilles Vigneault and also included Ti-Blanc Richard, Louis Bilodeau and Lévis Bouliane.

On June 20, 1977, Louis Bilodeau hosted the TV special Soirée canadienne du Québec à l'Olympia in Paris for Radio-Canada. This show presented members from the Festival des Cantons in Estrie, as well as Ti-Blanc Richard. The American-French singer Joe Dassin was part of the show. The program was broadcast on the 31st of the month, the first time that the Soirée canadienne team participated on a special produced by a network other than Télé-Métropole.

The accordion player Denis Côté was featured regularly on episodes produced in 1982 and 1983, along with pianist Simon Blanchette (died in 2016) and double bass player Yvon Guillemette.

=== Discography ===
A series of vinyl discs containing selected musical performances from the show were released. The first LP was released in 1971, comprising songs from the previous two years of the show, and five more discs were produced over the following years. One of them celebrated the 500th episode in 1973.

=== Cancellation ===
The decision to cancel the show, one of TVA's most venerable, was made in April 1981 by Bernard Fabi, (Note: Brother of radio host Jacques Fabi.) who was the vice president of Télé-7 Sherbrooke. The decision was not due to low ratings, as the show had 150,000 viewers every week, but because Fabi and CHLT felt the formula had been exhausted. Despite public protest and a petition with 4000 signatures sent to CHLT, they stood by their decision and the show was cancelled.

Twenty five years later, the ethnologist Serge Gauthier attributed the end of Soirée canadienne to another factor besides the tired formula. According to Gauthier, the period after the 1980 Quebec referendum was a lean period during which audiences no longer wanted to watch shows featuring Quebec folklore, which had been an emblem of the previous decade.

The last episode aired on May 28, 1983, on all TVA stations. Bilodeau had told his friends and family that he would have liked to have hosted the show up to its 25th anniversary. Many episodes recorded since 1975 were rerun in the Fall, and then on Sunday mornings.

Louis Bilodeau died of cancer on November 27, 2006, at the age of 81. A DVD featuring segments of the show had been released only one month earlier, which included new material that he had recently filmed at home in Sherbrooke.

== Rebroadcasts ==
None of the episodes produced in the 1960s survive; all that remains are colour episodes filmed between 1972 and 1983. Since the launch of Prise 2 in 2006, the network has regularly broadcast episodes of Soirée canadienne. This channel is dedicated to showing classics from television and cinema.

Rebroadcasts began in 2006, when TVA aired a TV special for Easter which was unexpectedly successful. After this special the network decided to rebroadcast full one-hour episodes. Starting in Fall 2006 they have been airing every Saturday from 8 to 9 PM, with a repeat the next day.

On December 31, 2007, TVA aired a New Year's special consisting of segments from holiday episodes of Soirée canadienne produced in the 1970s and 1980s. This was the first time since 1983 that episodes of the show were broadcast on the entire network.

Between 2009 and 2015, reruns were aired just before hockey on Saturday evenings at 7 PM, the same timeslot as in the 1970s and 1980s, and then again the next day. From 2015 to 2019, the show was moved to the 8 PM timeslot, but it returned to 7 PM in January 2020.

=== DVD releases ===
Three DVD sets featuring select episodes were released between 2006 and 2008.

- The first DVD is called Soirée canadienne avec Louis Bilodeau. It was released on October 24, 2006, by the folklorist Jean Collard. It contained the Easter special a by TVA in 2006 with previously unseen segments, including interviews with Louis Bilodeau.
- Soirée canadienne : volume 2 was launched on October 24, 2007, for the holiday season.
- Soirée canadienne : volume 3 was released on October 21, 2008.

== Tributes and Awards ==
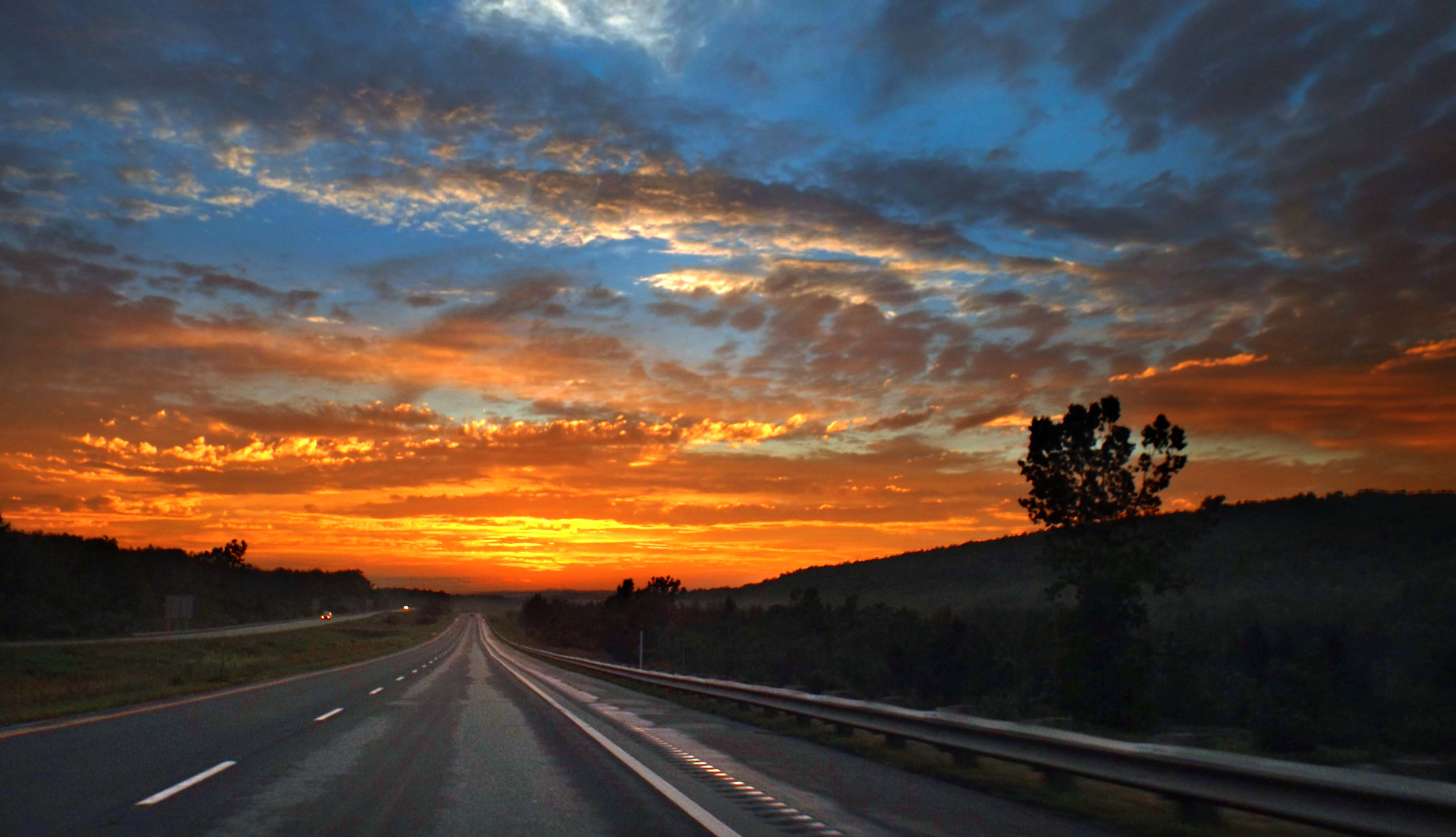
Sunset on autoroute Louis-Bilodeau.

At the first annual CanPro Award Show in March 1974, Soirée canadienne won the prize for best TV show in Canada, in all categories, as well as the prize for best entertainment broadcast. The competition was open to all private television stations in the country. The main criteria nominees were judged on was a program's relevance to its target audience as well as its originality.

A mural was unveiled in September 2006 in Sherbrooke with Louis Bilodeau in attendance. It was created by the MURIRS group. The work measures 120 feet and features thirty cultural figures from past and present, brought together for the 50th anniversary of CHLT-TV. Louis Bilodeau is depicted in this mural. As his health was fragile at this point in his life this was a rare public appearance. The mural is located on rue Frontenac, in front of the Sherbrooke Nature and Science Museum.

On January 7, 2008, the city of Sherbrooke announced its intention of renaming Quebec Autoroute 610 in honour of Louis Bilodeau. The autoroute was officially renamed on April 22, 2008, as "Autoroute Louis-Bilodeau" by the Commission de toponymie du Québec.
