= Réseau Pathonic =

Canadian French-language TV network

Réseau Pathonic (the "Pathonic Network"; often shortened to Pathonic) was a French-language television network operating in the Canadian province of Quebec from 1986 to 1990. The network was owned by Pathonic Communications Inc., controlled by the family of Paul Vien with 51%, and Télé-Métropole (owners of CFTM-TV Montreal) with 34%, with the remaining 15% owned by others. Although Pathonic was a Canadian Radio-television and Telecommunications Commission (CRTC)-licensed network within Quebec, its operations and coverage would be more comparable today to a television system rather than a full-fledged network.

The network consisted of the following stations, all of which were purchased by Pathonic Communications in 1979:

- CFCM-TV Quebec City
- CFER-TV Rimouski
- CHLT-TV Sherbrooke
- CHEM-TV Trois-Rivières
- CIMT-TV Rivière-du-Loup

All of these stations were owned by Pathonic with the exception of CIMT, which was, and still is, owned by Télé Inter-Rives. However, Pathonic held a 45 percent stake in Télé Inter-Rives.

All of the stations in the Pathonic network were also affiliated with TVA. However, these stations often aired programming substantially different from other TVA affiliates – even though Télé-Métropole, owner of CFTM-TV, was the major minority shareholder. In those days, TVA, much like CTV at the time and Global in the early-2000s, did not have what could be considered a main network schedule. The differences between schedules were strong enough that CHLT was carried on nearly all cable systems in Montréal from the early-1980s onward; CHLT's over-the-air signal covers most of the Greater Montreal area. The closest parallel to this in English Canada was the now-defunct Baton Broadcast System (BBS; in operation during the 1990s), as most of its stations were also CTV affiliates.

The network was dissolved when Pathonic Communications merged with Télé-Métropole in 1990, creating the present-day TVA network and chain of stations. The sale unified the ownership of most of TVA's major affiliates (except outlets owned by Radio-Nord and Télé Inter-Rives, the latter whose 45% share is now owned by TVA) and ultimately unified the network's schedule.

Pathonic Communications also owned CKMI-TV, an English-language station in Quebec City which was affiliated with CBC Television until 1997 (and which is now a Montreal-based Global owned and operated station).
