= Dominion Network =

Former CBC radio network

CBC Dominion Network
- Type: Public broadcaster / radio network
- Country: Canada

Programming
- Format: Light entertainment

Ownership
- Owner: Canadian Broadcasting Corporation
- Key people: Spence Caldwell

History
- Launch date: January 1, 1944
- Closed: October 1, 1962

Coverage
- Availability: National, through CJBC and private affiliates

The Dominion Network was the second English-language radio network of the Canadian Broadcasting Corporation (CBC). It operated from 1 January 1944 until 1 October 1962, alongside the CBC's main English-language service, the Trans-Canada Network.

The Dominion Network was created to provide an alternative CBC-controlled national service for private affiliates, advertisers and listeners who wanted more popular and commercially sponsored programming. Its flagship and only CBC-owned station was CJBC in Toronto; the rest of the network consisted of privately owned affiliate stations across Canada. Compared with the Trans-Canada Network, which emphasized news, public affairs, educational programming and cultural broadcasts, the Dominion Network carried more light entertainment, commercial programming and American network material.

== Background ==
Before 1944, the CBC operated a single English-language radio network. By the early 1940s, pressure had grown from listeners, advertisers and privately owned stations for alternative programming, particularly commercial and American network programs that could attract larger audiences and advertising revenue. Private stations also wanted greater access to network programming without having to rely entirely on the CBC's main service.

The CBC was concerned that private broadcasters might campaign successfully for permission to operate a separate private radio network. Under the broadcasting legislation then in force, radio networks could not operate without CBC approval. Rather than permit a privately controlled national network, the CBC created a second English-language network under its own authority.

== Launch ==
The Dominion Network was formed on 1 January 1944. The existing CBC English network was renamed the Trans-Canada Network, while the new second service became the Dominion Network. The CBC lined up 34 existing and planned private stations as affiliates, but it initially lacked a Toronto key station after CFRB declined to join the new network.

The solution was to use the CBC-owned Toronto station CBY, formerly CKNC and CRCY, as the network's flagship. CBY became CJBC on 15 November 1943, and when the Dominion Network was launched in 1944, CJBC became its key station. The CBC planned to increase CJBC's power and move it to 860 kHz, a clear-channel frequency that had previously been occupied by CFRB.

The Dominion Network's first sponsored program was the American panel show Information Please, carried experimentally in April 1944 before the network's full complement of programming began later that year. CJBC carried programs from the Blue Network, NBC, the BBC and other sources, while also originating programs for the Dominion Network.

== Management and programming ==
The CBC hired Spence Caldwell, formerly commercial manager of CKWX in Vancouver, to manage the new network. Caldwell was chosen because of his commercial radio experience and was based at CJBC in Toronto. He managed a network made up almost entirely of private affiliates; CJBC was the only CBC-owned station in the Dominion Network. Caldwell later left the CBC for All-Canada Radio Facilities and subsequently became one of the founders of the CTV Television Network.

The Dominion Network's schedule was intended to complement rather than duplicate the Trans-Canada Network. It carried lighter and more commercial programming, including American entertainment series, popular music, drama, comedy and sponsored shows. Programs carried by Dominion affiliates included Duffy's Tavern, Amos 'n' Andy and Fibber McGee and Molly.

The network operated primarily during periods when national programming was commercially useful, particularly in the evening. This arrangement allowed private affiliates to carry local programming and sell local advertising during other parts of the broadcast day.

== Relationship with the Trans-Canada Network ==
From 1944 to 1962, the CBC operated two coast-to-coast English-language AM radio networks. The Trans-Canada Network was the principal CBC English service and included more CBC-owned stations, while the Dominion Network relied mainly on private affiliates and served as a more commercially oriented companion service.

Both networks were part of the CBC system and both carried some commercial programming. The distinction was therefore not absolute, but the Trans-Canada Network was generally associated with more serious, educational, cultural and public-affairs programming, while the Dominion Network was more closely associated with light entertainment and American network programs.

== Later years and dissolution ==
By the late 1950s and early 1960s, Canadian broadcasting was changing rapidly. Television had taken much of the audience and advertising revenue that had previously supported commercial network radio, and the CBC began reorganizing its radio services. The Canadian Encyclopedia notes that the CBC closed the Dominion Network in 1962 as radio's role in Canadian broadcasting changed.

The Dominion Network was dissolved on 1 October 1962. The Trans-Canada and Dominion networks were consolidated into a single CBC radio service, linking CBC-owned stations with private affiliates used where necessary to fill coverage gaps. Some private stations resisted continued CBC affiliation after the merger, and the CBC gradually reduced its reliance on private affiliates as it built or funded its own transmitters and repeaters.

After the merger, CJBC began carrying some French-language programming. By 1964, it had become an entirely French-language station and later became the Toronto outlet of Radio-Canada's French-language radio service, now Ici Radio-Canada Première.

== Stations ==
The Dominion Network's affiliate lineup changed over time. In 1945, the CBC listed the following as Dominion basic stations: CJFX, CHNS, CFCY, CKCW, CKNB, CJLS, CKCO, CHOV, CFBR, CJBC, CHEX, CFPL, CFCO, CFPA, CHLT, CFCF, CKRC, CJGX, CKX, CKRM, CHAB, CFQC, CKBI, CFCN, CFRN, CJRL, CHWK, CJOR and CJVI.

Dominion Network stations
| Province | City | Station | Notes |
|---|---|---|---|
| Alberta | Calgary | CFCN | 1945 Dominion basic station; now defunct |
| Alberta | Edmonton | CFRN | 1945 Dominion basic station; affiliated with CBC Radio for two years after the Trans-Canada and Dominion networks merged; now defunct |
| Alberta | Medicine Hat | CHAT | Affiliated with CBC Radio when the Trans-Canada and Dominion networks merged |
| British Columbia | Chilliwack | CHWK | 1945 Dominion basic station; affiliated with CBC Radio when the Trans-Canada and Dominion networks merged |
| British Columbia | Penticton | CKOK | Affiliated with CBC Radio when the Trans-Canada and Dominion networks merged |
| British Columbia | Vancouver | CJOR | 1945 Dominion basic station |
| British Columbia | Vernon | CJIB | |
| British Columbia | Victoria | CJVI | 1945 Dominion basic station; affiliated with CBC Radio when the Trans-Canada and Dominion networks merged |
| Manitoba | Brandon | CKX | 1945 Dominion basic station; affiliated with CBC Radio when the Trans-Canada and Dominion networks merged |
| Manitoba | Winnipeg | CKRC | 1945 Dominion basic station |
| New Brunswick | Saint John | CFBC | |
| Nova Scotia | Halifax | CHNS | 1945 Dominion basic station |
| Nova Scotia | Sydney | CJCB | Affiliated from 1948; previously a Trans-Canada Network affiliate |
| Ontario | Brantford | CKPC | Now defunct |
| Ontario | Brockville | CFBR | 1945 Dominion basic station; later CFJM and CFJR |
| Ontario | Fort Frances | CKFI | Affiliated with CBC Radio when the Trans-Canada and Dominion networks merged |
| Ontario | Hamilton | CHML | Now defunct |
| Ontario | Kenora | CJRL | 1945 Dominion basic station; CBC Dominion affiliate |
| Ontario | Kingston | CKLC / CKLC-FM | Shared affiliation, 1953–1962 |
| Ontario | Kitchener | CKCR | Affiliated 1949–1960; CKCR-AM-FM affiliated with CBC Radio when the Trans-Canada and Dominion networks merged |
| Ontario | London | CFPL | 1945 Dominion basic station; affiliated with CBC Radio when the Trans-Canada and Dominion networks merged |
| Ontario | Orillia | CFOR | Affiliated from 1945; affiliated with CBC Radio when the Trans-Canada and Dominion networks merged |
| Ontario | Ottawa | CKCO | 1945 Dominion basic station; became CKOY in 1949; now defunct |
| Ontario | Owen Sound | CFOS | Affiliated with CBC Radio when the Trans-Canada and Dominion networks merged |
| Ontario | Peterborough | CHEX | 1945 Dominion basic station |
| Ontario | St. Catharines | CKTB | |
| Ontario | Stratford | CJCS | |
| Ontario | Sudbury | CHNO | |
| Ontario | Thunder Bay | CFPA | 1945 Dominion basic station; affiliated with CBC Radio when the Trans-Canada and Dominion networks merged |
| Ontario | Toronto | CJBC | Flagship station; only CBC owned-and-operated Dominion station; converted to French-language Radio-Canada service in 1964 |
| Ontario | Windsor | CKLW | Affiliated with both the Trans-Canada and Dominion networks until 1950, when CBC-owned CBE launched |
| Ontario | Wingham | CKNX | |
| Prince Edward Island | Charlottetown | CFCY | 1945 Dominion basic station; affiliated with CBC Radio when the Trans-Canada and Dominion networks merged |
| Quebec | Montreal | CFCF | 1945 Dominion basic station; now defunct |
| Quebec | Quebec City | CJQC | Affiliated in 1949; previously CKCV was affiliated with both the Trans-Canada Network and the Dominion Network; CJQC affiliated with CBC Radio when the networks merged; now defunct |
| Saskatchewan | Moose Jaw | CHAB | 1945 Dominion basic station |
| Saskatchewan | Prince Albert | CKBI | 1945 Dominion basic station |
| Saskatchewan | Regina | CKRM | 1945 Dominion basic station |
| Saskatchewan | Saskatoon | CFQC | 1945 Dominion basic station |
| Saskatchewan | Yorkton | CJGX | 1945 Dominion basic station |

== Legacy ==
The Dominion Network was an important part of the CBC's attempt to balance public-service broadcasting with the commercial realities of privately owned radio stations. It allowed the CBC to keep control over national networking while giving private affiliates access to popular and sponsored programming. Its creation also delayed the emergence of a private Canadian broadcasting network; Spence Caldwell, its first manager, later helped establish CTV as Canada's first private television network.

The network's closure in 1962 marked the end of the CBC's two-network English AM radio structure. The surviving English radio service eventually became CBC Radio One, while the CBC later developed a separate FM service that became CBC Music.

== See also ==
- CBC Radio One
- Trans-Canada Network
- Canadian Broadcasting Corporation
- CJBC (AM)
- Spence Caldwell
