= CHLT-DT =

Television station in Quebec, Canada

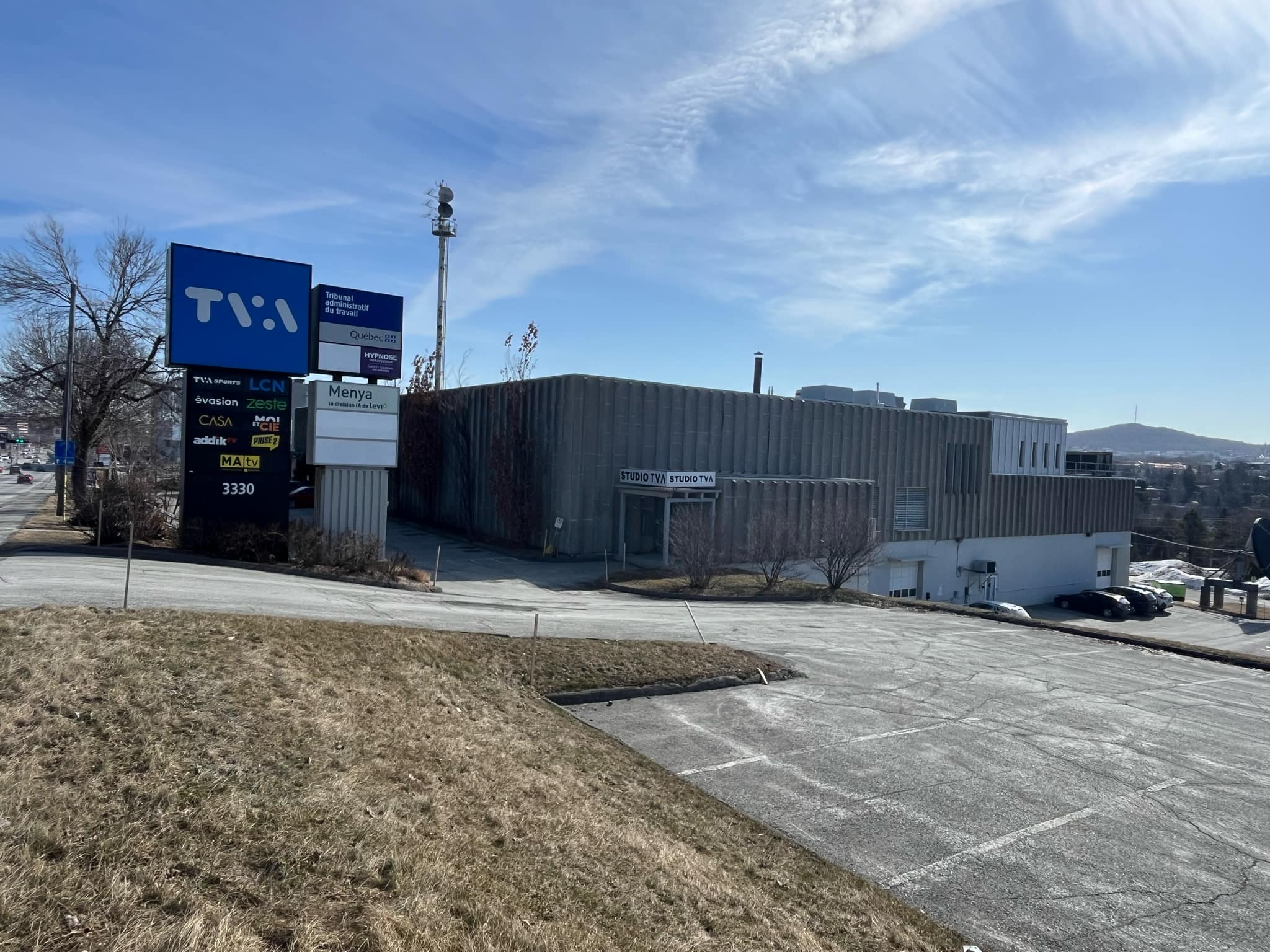
- CHLT-DT studios in Sherbrooke
- Sherbrooke, Quebec; Canada
- Channels: Digital: 8 (VHF); Virtual: 7
- Branding: TVA (general); TVA Nouvelles (newscasts)

Programming
- Affiliations: TVA

Ownership
- Owner: Groupe TVA

History
- First air date: August 12, 1956
- Former call signs: CHLT-TV (1956–2011)
- Former channel numbers: Analog: 7 (VHF, 1956-2011)
- Former affiliations: Radio-Canada (1956–1974); CBC (secondary, 1956–1961); Réseau Pathonic (1986–1990)
- Call sign meaning: La Tribune, the original owner of the station

Technical information
- Licensing authority: CRTC
- ERP: 4 kW
- HAAT: 588.1 m (1,929 ft)
- Transmitter coordinates: 45°18′43″N 72°14′30″W

Links
- Website: www.tvanouvelles.ca/regional/tva-sherbrooke

CHLT-DT (channel 7) is a television station in Sherbrooke, Quebec, Canada, owned and operated by the French-language network TVA. The station maintains studios on Rue King Ouest (near Route 112) in Sherbrooke and a transmitter in Orford, Quebec.

CHLT went on the air on August 12, 1956, and was a bilingual French- and English-language station through 1961. It aired Radio-Canada and local programming, most notably the series Soirée canadienne, which aired for 23 years. In 1974, a dedicated Radio-Canada station (CKSH-TV) opened, and CHLT became a full-time TVA affiliate. Under several owners, CHLT continued to be the leading station in local television ratings. Groupe TVA acquired CHLT in 1990 as part of its purchase of the Réseau Pathonic. As of 2024, regional news programs for the Estrie are produced in Quebec City, though a reporting team remains based in Sherbrooke.

== History ==
On January 8, 1954, the La Tribune newspaper (owner of radio station CHLT) was awarded a licence to build and operate a television station in Sherbrooke on channel 7 by the Ministry of Transport. When the licence was awarded, the newspaper had already been deep in negotiations to solve the most pressing problem. Mont Orford, identified as the ideal site for television broadcasting, is a national park, and construction of a tower on its summit required provincial legislative approval. The Legislative Assembly of Quebec approved the necessary legislation on January 27, 1955, and a lease was formally signed in June. An 11,336-foot (3,455 m) road to the new transmitter site had to be erected in difficult winter weather conditions.

CHLT-TV went on the air for the first time on August 12, 1956, and was the most powerful TV station in Canada at that time. It provided the first French-language or Canadian TV service in an area that had previously only received two American stations. Seventy percent of its programming was in French. In addition to CBC and Radio-Canada programs, local shows were produced in French and English and took up a third of channel 7's broadcast day. Daily English-language programs were discontinued on December 31, 1961, but CHLT-TV continued to air films in English as late as 1967. Popular programs included Jamboree and Soirée canadienne (Canadian Night), the latter of which lasted 23 years on the air and produced more than 600 episodes.

By 1961, a station that had started with one studio now had three and permanent cameras to telecast Sunday Mass from Saint-Michel Basilica-Cathedral. In 1966, the Power Corporation of Canada acquired the CHLT stations as well as the English-language CKTS, which moved in 1967 out of the La Tribune building to new studios on King Street West. The new studios were equipped for local color television production and hosted a variety of programs, including the children's series Tonton Bonbon and a morning newscast. Network programs continued to originate from Radio-Canada as well as Télé-Metropole (CFTM-TV in Montreal), providing one of the strongest regional station lineups.

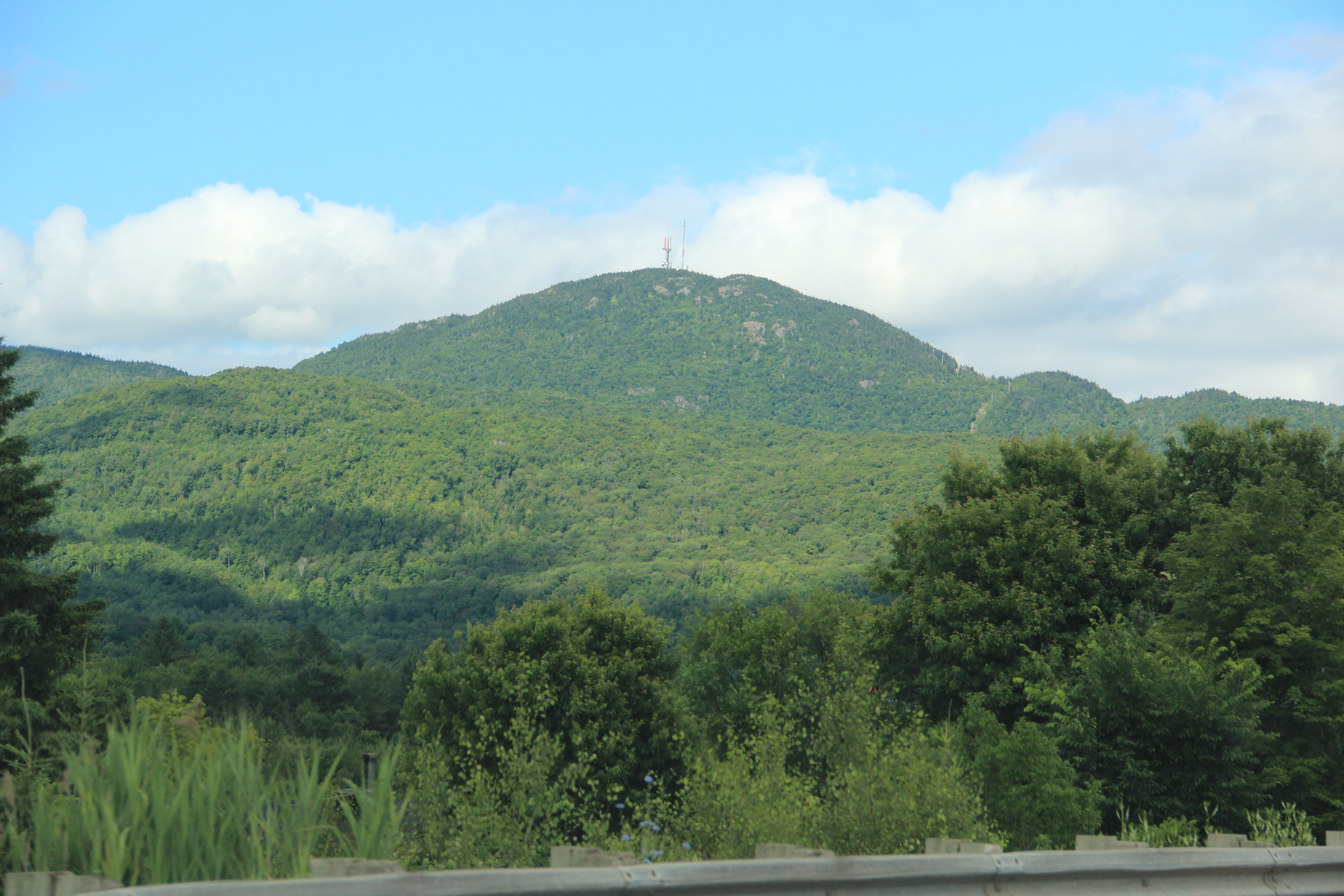
CHLT-DT is broadcast from Mont Orford.

Telemedia acquired the CHLT stations and CJBR-TV in Rimouski in 1970. The company harbored ambitions of creating a French-language private alternative to Radio-Canada. Meanwhile, the Canadian Radio-television and Telecommunications Commission (CRTC) became concerned about Telemedia's monopoly on television in Sherbrooke. At the same time, Radio-Canada's affiliate CKTM-TV was without competition in Trois-Rivières. To solve these problems, Telemedia opened CHEM-TV in Trois-Rivières, while CKTM brought a local Radio-Canada station to Sherbrooke with the launch of CKSH-TV on September 1, 1974. It became the sole Radio-Canada affiliate, and CHLT aligned exclusively with the TVA network and Télé-Métropole. The decision was seen as allowing TVA to become Quebec's second television network. CHLT-TV continued to offer a number of local programs and was named Station of the Year by the Canadian Association of Broadcasters in 1978.

In 1979, Telemedia sold CHLT and CHEM to Pathonic Communications Inc., a company 51 percent owned by Montreal financier Paul G. Vien and backed by 34 percent owner Télé-Métropole. The transaction split the television stations from Telemedia's radio interests. The CRTC imposed a limit on Télé-Métropole's ownership stake in the stations in order "to preserve [their] regional character". Under Pathonic, the station adopted the on-air name Télé-7 and increased its emphasis on news coverage, including a capital infusion for the news department. The 6 p.m. newscast was lengthened to a full hour in 1982, and a morning program, Café Show, broadcast from 1984 to 1990. Téle-Capitale Ltée. acquired Pathonic in 1986 and changed its name to the Réseau Pathonic. Live news inserts from Pathonic's CFCM-TV in Quebec City were also included in Café Show. During this time, Pathonic's scheduling of TVA programs differed greatly from that of Télé-Metropole. Pathonic's scheduling strategy at times brought more viewers to CHLT on cable in Montreal than to CFTM for the same program when aired later. In 1987, the musician Roch Voisine made his first television appearance on CHLT's Vidéostar program. CHLT dominated Sherbrooke television; in 1988, its local evening newscast, Le Monde (The World), had 95,000 viewers to CKSH's 9,000. Radio-Canada programming attracted lower ratings in Sherbrooke than in Montreal.

Vien's media holdings were challenged in the late 1980s by the arrival of Télévision Quatre-Saisons (TQS) into an increasingly crowded Quebec landscape. Cogeco launched a takeover bid for the network, leaving Télé-Métropole feeling threatened by a possible ownership change in the key owner of TVA network affiliates. Vien sold Réseau Pathonic to Télé-Métropole in a deal agreed in December 1989 and approved by the CRTC in July 1990. CHLT continued to originate programming for the TVA network after the takeover. CHLT remained on Montreal cable systems until 1995. During this time, TQS provided stiff competition to TVA's Estrie news service. In 2001, TQS drew more viewers than CHLT for the 6 p.m. news.

As part of a network-wide layoff scheme in 2023, TVA laid off 50 employees in Sherbrooke, a third of the total workforce, leaving six journalists and four photographers on the news staff. Included in the layoffs was a plan to begin originating local news programs from CFCM in Quebec City. On May 17, 2024, CHLT aired the final TVA newscast originating from the Sherbrooke studio; regional news for Sherbrooke is now presented from Quebec City.

== Notable former on-air staff ==
- Marc Laurendeau — host of the public affairs program Reflet d'actualité, 1976

== Subchannel ==
Subchannel of CHLT-DT
Subchannel	Res.	Short name	Programming
7.1	1080i	CHLT	TVA
