= CHEM-DT =

Television station in Trois-Rivières

- Trois-Rivières, Quebec; Canada
- Channels: Digital: 8 (VHF); Virtual: 8
- Branding: TVA (general); TVA Nouvelles (newscasts)

Programming
- Affiliations: TVA

Ownership
- Owner: Groupe TVA

History
- First air date: August 29, 1976
- Former call signs: CHEM-TV (1976–2011)
- Former channel numbers: Analog: 8 (VHF, 1976–2011)
- Former affiliations: Réseau Pathonic (1986–1990)

Technical information
- Licensing authority: CRTC
- ERP: 11.5 kW
- HAAT: 291.5 m (956 ft)
- Transmitter coordinates: 46°30′7″N 72°38′10″W

Links
- Website: TVA Trois-Rivières

CHEM-DT (channel 8) is a television station in Trois-Rivières, Quebec, Canada, owned and operated by the French-language network TVA. The station's studios are located on Boulevard de Chanoine-Moreau and Rue Jacques de Labadie in Trois-Rivières, with a transmitter on Rue Principale in Notre-Dame-du-Mont-Carmel.

== History ==
The station was founded on August 29, 1976, and was owned by Telemedia. It was originally a semi-satellite of CHLT-TV in Sherbrooke, and has been a TVA station for its entire existence. Pathonic Communications bought CHEM and four other stations in 1979. Sometime in the 1980s, CHEM severed the electronic umbilical cord with CHLT and became a full-fledged station. Télé-Metropole, owner of TVA flagship station CFTM-TV in Montreal, bought Pathonic in 1989, and since then CHEM has essentially been a semi-satellite of CFTM.
