= CFOM (AM) =

Former radio station in Quebec City, Quebec, Canada

Defunct
- Quebec City, Quebec; Canada
- Frequency: 1350 kHz

Programming
- Language: English
- Affiliations: CBC Radio (1962–1975); Trans-Canada Network (primary, 1949-1962); Dominion Network (secondary, 1949-1962)

Ownership
- Owner: Goodwill Broadcasters of Quebec

History
- First air date: 1949
- Last air date: August 8, 1975 (operated as rebroadcaster of CBM through 1976)
- Former call signs: CJNT (1949–1953); CJQC (1953–1964)
- Former frequencies: 1340 kHz (1949–1967)

Technical information
- Power: 1,000 watts

CFOM was a radio station in Quebec City, Quebec, Canada. It was the only full-time English language radio station in the city until it was shut down in 1976.

== History ==
The station was launched in 1949, with the call sign CJNT, later changing to CJQC in 1953. It finally adopted the CFOM call sign, which it retained for the remainder of its existence, in 1964. For its entire history, it was owned by Goodwill Broadcasters of Quebec.

The station was a privately owned affiliate of CBC Radio's main network, the Trans-Canada Network (forerunner of today's CBC Radio One). Until 1963, it was also a supplementary affiliate of CBC Radio's second network, the Dominion Network. At the time Quebec City was the only provincial capital without a CBC-owned and -operated English-language radio station. This put CFOM in a difficult position as a commercial station whose license required it to air predominantly non-commercial programming. As such, it lost money for most of its existence.

The station's struggles were magnified by its status as an anglophone station in a nearly monolingual francophone city. As a result, its potential audience was just barely large enough for it to be viable as a standalone station. Most of its listenership came from anglophone members of the National Assembly, as well as anglophone provincial and federal government employees.

Goodwill realized early on that it was in a precarious position. In 1951, Goodwill asked for permission to offer service in both English and French. However, the CBC, which at the time doubled as both regulator and broadcaster, turned the request down. A year later, Goodwill asked for permission to switch to French only. That request was also turned down, leading the station to seriously consider going off the air.

In 1962, the CBC merged its two radio networks. This left CJQC as the only source of English programming in Quebec City; some Dominion programming had aired on CKCV, which dropped all English programming after the merger of the two networks.

In 1967, Goodwill asked the Board of Broadcast Governors, which had become Canada's broadcast regulator nine years earlier, to remove the stipulation that it operate only in English. Like the previous requests to change its operating language, it was refused.

Originally, the station operated on 1340 AM, broadcasting with 250 watts. This effectively limited its coverage area to Quebec City itself, and even there it was barely listenable. In 1967, three years after it was recalled CFOM, the station was allowed to move to 1350 AM and boost its power to 1,000 watts. Even with increased power, the station continued to bleed money.

In 1972, in hopes of getting more revenue, CFOM cut CBC programming to the network-mandated minimum. The rest of the day was taken up by Top 40 hits. Subsequent ratings and commercial financial returns for the station improved as French listeners now tuned in to hear popular English language music. However, in 1974, the Canadian Radio-television and Telecommunications Commission ordered the station to go back to carrying CBC programming full-time.

Rather than comply with the CRTC order, owner Norman Lucas tried to put the station up for sale. The request was denied, and Lucas took the station off the air at 5 p.m. on August 8, 1975. Earlier, Lucas said that the various Canadian broadcast regulators had put CFOM in an impossible position. CFOM had long had a special mandate to serve Quebec City's anglophones. However, the CBC either would not or could not open its own station there, all but forcing CFOM to fulfill its mandate by affiliating with CBC.

Shortly before, disk jockey Al MacKay gave a special farewell message in English and French, followed by its final song, the 1975 "The Way We Were" / "Try to Remember" medley by Gladys Knight & the Pips. At the time of the station's demise, 110,000 listeners tuned in on a regular basis—decent numbers considering Quebec City's high francophone population.

However, the silence proved to be brief. Just hours later, it returned as a CBC-owned rebroadcaster of CBM in Montreal. The CBC had been licensed to open CBVE-FM as a CBM rebroadcaster, but it was not due to go on the air until the spring of 1976. The CBC thus persuaded Lucas to sell it the CFOM license in order to ensure an interim source for CBC programming until CBVE-FM could be launched. No privately owned anglophone station has signed on in Quebec City since CFOM's demise.

The callsign is now assigned to an unrelated francophone station, CFOM-FM.
