= CFER-DT =

Television station in Rimouski, Quebec, Canada

- Rimouski, Quebec; Canada
- Channels: Digital: 11 (VHF); Virtual: 11
- Branding: TVA (general); TVA Nouvelles (newscasts)

Programming
- Affiliations: TVA

Ownership
- Owner: Groupe TVA

History
- First air date: June 4, 1978
- Former channel numbers: Analog: 11 (VHF, 1978–2015)
- Former affiliations: Réseau Pathonic (secondary; 1986–1990)

Technical information
- Licensing authority: CRTC
- ERP: CFER-DT: 3.3 kW; CFER-TV-2: 100 kW
- HAAT: CFER-DT: 432.8 m (1,420 ft); CFER-TV-2: 284.4 m (933 ft)
- Transmitter coordinates: CFER-DT: 48°28′2″N 68°12′39″W; CFER-TV-2: 50°10′19″N 66°44′17″W
- Translator(s): CFER-TV-2 5 Sept-Îles

Links
- Website: TVA Est du Québec

CFER-DT (channel 11) is a television station in Rimouski, Quebec, Canada, owned and operated by the French-language network TVA. The station's studios are located on Boulevard Sainte-Anne/Route 132 (near the shoreline of the Saint Lawrence River) in Pointe-au-Père, and its transmitter is located in Saint-Donat. It also operates a rebroadcast transmitter in Sept-Îles (CFER-TV-2, broadcasting on VHF analog channel 5).

== History ==
The station was launched on June 4, 1978.

On October 30, 2014, TVA applied to convert the station from analog to digital operations, remaining on VHF 11 with an effective radiated power of 1.732 kW (maximum of 3.3 kW) at 430.1 meters in height, compared to 174 kW (maximum of 325 kW) at 432.8 meters in height (their then-current analog configuration). This application was approved on February 16, 2015. The station flash-cut to digital operations on VHF 11 on January 11, 2016.
