= TVA Nouvelles =

Canadian network news division

- Type: Department of TVA
- Industry: Media
- Founded: 1972
- Headquarters: Montreal, Quebec, Canada
- Key people: Martin Picard, Chief Content Officer
- Owner: TVA
- Website: www.tvanouvelles.ca

TVA Nouvelles is the news division of TVA, a French language television network in Canada.

Programs produced by the division include nightly local and national newscasts branded as TVA Nouvelles, as well as the news magazine program JE. The division also owns and operates the 24-hour news channel Le Canal Nouvelles.

In September 2020, the Group announced that Serge Fortin, who was managing the activities of TVA Nouvelles and LCN since 2004, would be replaced by Martin Picard, vice president and chief content officer.

== Mornings ==
In the mornings, TVA Nouvelles airs as headline news segments during the network's morning show Salut, Bonjour!. This program is hosted by Ève-Marie Lortie weekdays from Montreal, and Richard Turcotte on weekends from Quebec City.

Lortie was previously the weekend host of Salut, bonjour!, until moving to weekdays in 2024 following the retirement of longtime weekday host Gino Chouinard.

== Noon ==
At noon, TVA Nouvelles airs for one hour weekdays and half an hour on weekends. Two weekday editions are produced, with Julie Marcoux anchoring from Montreal for stations in western Quebec markets (Gatineau/Ottawa, Sherbrooke, Trois-Rivières and Rouyn-Noranda), and Julie Couture anchoring from Quebec City for stations in eastern Quebec (Rimouski, Rivière-du-Loup/Carleton-sur-Mer and Saguenay). Both programs also have segments set aside for local inserts presented by local anchors.

Marcoux is slated to move to the afternoon (17h et 18h) newscast in June, and will be succeeded as anchor of the noon edition by Philippe-Vincent Foisy.

As most viewers in Canada outside of Quebec receive TVA stations from Montreal or Gatineau/Ottawa, the edition anchored by Marcoux is seen in most of Canada, although parts of New Brunswick receive the Couture edition.

== Afternoon ==
At 5 p.m. weekdays, TVA Nouvelles airs for 1.5 hours. This airing consists of a one-hour program anchored by Sophie Thibault, followed by half-hour local programs anchored by a local journalist at each TVA station. Thibault announced her retirement from the network in February 2025, with Julie Marcoux scheduled to succeed her in June.

The local anchors are Pierre Donais on CHOT-DT in Gatineau/Ottawa, Martin Blanchet on CFER-DT in Rimouski, Cindy Simard on CIMT-DT in Rivière-du-Loup and CHAU-DT in Carleton-sur-Mer, Katherine Vandal on CFEM-DT in Rouyn-Noranda, Jean-François Tremblay on CJPM-DT in Saguenay, Sonia Lavoie on CHLT-DT in Sherbrooke and Marie-Claude Paradis-Desfossés on CHEM-DT in Trois-Rivières. Thibault continues as anchor of the final half-hour on CFTM-DT in Montreal, and Couture anchors on CFCM-DT in Quebec City. At 6:30, Thibault continues to anchor for a further half-hour which airs only on LCN.

On weekends, the 5 p.m. program does not air, with only a half-hour edition airing at 6 p.m. and anchored by Hadi Hassin.

== Primetime ==
The main national edition of TVA Nouvelles, airing at 10 p.m. for half an hour, is anchored by Pierre-Olivier Zappa weekdays. On weekends, the network simply simulcasts LCN for a half-hour slot, usually at 10:30 p.m. but sometimes delayed to 11 p.m. depending on that evening's earlier programming, rather than directly producing a TVA-specific newscast.

== JE ==
The news magazine program JE is anchored by Marie-Christine Bergeron.

== Past staff ==
Past anchors of the network's newscasts have included Stéphane Bureau, who remains affiliated with the program as a special contributor, as well as Pierre Bruneau and Michel Jean.
