= CHLT =

CHLT may refer to:

- CHLT-DT, a television station (channel 7) licensed to serve Sherbrooke, Quebec, Canada
- CKOY-FM, a radio station (107.7 FM) licensed to serve Sherbrooke, which formerly held the call sign CHLT-FM from 2007 to 2011; originally on AM as CHLT from 1937 to 2007
- CITE-FM-1, a radio station (102.7 FM) licensed to serve Sherbrooke, which formerly held the call sign CHLT-FM beginning in the 1960s
