= Jamie Orchard =

Canadian journalist

Jamie Orchard is a retired Canadian journalist, who now works for VIA Rail. She was the host and news anchor for Global Montreal's weekday evening news program.

She was born and raised in the Montreal suburb of Brossard, Quebec. She graduated from Concordia University.
