= CJPM-DT =

Television station in Saguenay, Quebec

- Saguenay, Quebec; Canada
- Channels: Digital: 24 (UHF); Virtual: 6
- Branding: TVA (general); TVA Nouvelles (newscasts)

Programming
- Affiliations: TVA

Ownership
- Owner: Groupe TVA

History
- First air date: April 14, 1963
- Former channel numbers: Analog: 6 (VHF, 1963–2011); Digital: 46 (UHF, 2011–?)
- Former affiliations: Independent (1963–1971)

Technical information
- Licensing authority: CRTC
- ERP: CJPM-DT: 200 kW; CJPM-TV-1: 23.5 kW
- HAAT: CJPM-DT: 107.4 m (352 ft); CJPM-TV-1: 164 m (538 ft)
- Transmitter coordinates: CJPM-DT: 48°24′28″N 71°5′4″W; CJPM-TV-1: 48°23′20″N 72°5′20″W
- Translator(s): CJPM-TV-1 10 Roberval

Links
- Website: TVA Saguenay–Lac-Saint-Jean

CJPM-DT (channel 6) is a television station in Saguenay, Quebec, Canada, owned and operated by the French-language network TVA. The station's studios and transmitter are located on Rue du Mont Sainte Claire in the former city of Chicoutimi.

== History ==
The station signed on for the first time on April 14, 1963, as CJPM-TV. Its owner, John Murdock, who died on October 2 of that same year, soon realized that he didn't have the revenue to challenge Radio-Canada affiliate CKRS-TV (now CKTV-DT) on his own. To obtain better programming, he started sharing CJPM's programs with the largest privately owned francophone station in Canada, CFTM-TV in Montreal, owned by Télé-Métropole. Along with Quebec City's CFCM-TV (owned by Télévision de Québec, a consortium of theatre chain Famous Players and Quebec City's two private AM radio stations, CHRC and CKCV, which joined the group in 1964 after disaffiliating from Radio-Canada), this collective of independent stations was the forerunner of TVA, though the network was not formally created until September 12, 1971, with CJPM as one of its three charter affiliates, alongside CFTM and CFCM.

John Murdock's family sold the station to Télé-Métropole in 1982. It became a TVA owned-and-operated station when Télé-Métropole bought majority control of the network in 1990. Since then it has been basically a semi-satellite of CFTM, except for newscasts. It was licensed to Chicoutimi until the formation of the "megacity" of Saguenay in 2002.

CJPM-DT signed on its digital signal on August 29, 2011, from a temporary antenna at Mont Sainte-Claire.
