= CFCM-DT =

Television station in Quebec City, Canada

- Quebec City, Quebec; Canada
- Channels: Digital: 17 (UHF); Virtual: 4
- Branding: TVA (general); TVA Nouvelles (newscasts)

Programming
- Affiliations: 4.1: TVA

Ownership
- Owner: Groupe TVA

History
- First air date: July 17, 1954
- Former channel numbers: Analog: 4 (VHF, 1954–2011)
- Former affiliations: CBC (1954–1957); Radio-Canada (1954–1964); Independent (1964–1971); Réseau Pathonic (1986–1990)

Technical information
- Licensing authority: CRTC
- ERP: 80 kW
- HAAT: 174.6 m (573 ft)
- Transmitter coordinates: 46°48′27″N 71°13′00″W

Links
- Website: TVA Québec

CFCM-DT (channel 4) is a television station in Quebec City, Quebec, Canada, owned and operated by the French-language network TVA. The station's studios are located on de l'Exposition Street near the Videotron Centre in the Quebec City borough of La Cité-Limoilou, and its transmitter is located atop Édifice Marie-Guyart, in downtown Quebec City.

Until 2011, the station's transmitter facilities previously also hosted the transmitter for CBVE-TV (channel 5), the now-defunct local rebroadcaster of Montreal's CBMT-DT, when that station relocated to CBVT-DT's former analog channel (VHF channel 11), which broadcasts from Mount Bélair.

== History ==
CFCM was Quebec's first private television station, going on the air for the first time on July 17, 1954. The transmitter building and studio were located on St.-Jean Boscoe Street, near Cite Universitaire. The tower contract had been let to Cobra Industries Inc. and the total estimated cost of TV station and building was CA$500,000. The transmitter sat atop a 440-metre (1,444 ft)-tall lattice tower, which gave the station a 50-mile (80 km) coverage radius.

CFCM started out as a private bilingual CBC/Radio-Canada affiliate. The station's original owner was Télévision de Québec, a consortium of theatre chain Famous Players and Quebec City's two private AM radio stations, CHRC and CKCV.

At its launch, CFCM was immediately connected to Montreal by microwave relay through five relay stations. up with both the CBC and Radio-Canada microwave networks. The station dropped all English programming on March 17, 1957, when Télévision de Québec launched CKMI-TV. When Radio-Canada opened CBVT (channel 11) on September 7, 1964, CFCM became an independent station. It lost 45 hours a week of network programming and was forced to cancel a number of its local productions. It networked with the other two private independent francophone TV stations—Montreal's CFTM-TV and Chicoutimi's CJPM-TV—to form TVA, with the first network broadcast on September 12, 1971.

Télévision de Québec was nearly forced to sell its stations in 1969 due to the Canadian Radio and Television Commission's (CRTC) new rules requiring radio and television stations to be 80% Canadian-owned. The largest shareholder, Famous Players, was a subsidiary of American film studio Paramount Pictures. The CRTC had additionally denied a 1968 bid to sell CFCM and CKMI to Teltron Communications Ltd. In 1970, the CRTC ordered Télévision de Québec to present a plan for restructuring its ownership in accordance with the law or else it would take bids for replacement licensees. As a result, Famous Players reduced its shares to 20 percent by selling off to three Quebec City firms, allowing Télévision de Québec to keep CKMI and CFCM. The company renamed itself Télé-Capitale in 1972. Télé-Capitale was bought in two phases by La Verendrye Management Corporation in 1979 and 1982; citing a high debt load, the firm sold the businesses to the Pathonic Corporation of Montreal in 1984. The firm then became known as the Pathonic Network in 1986 before being purchased by Télé-Metropole (which changed its name to TVA) in 1989 and 1990.

For most of the time from the 1970s through the 2000s, it was known on-air as "Télé-4" (TV-4 or channel 4).

In 1992, citing economic reasons, Télé-Métropole applied to reduce local production at CFCM from 21 hours a week to 10, a move sharply criticized by CRTC commissioners and to which the mayor of Quebec City protested. Since then, CFCM has been a semi-satellite of CFTM, except for newscasts. Despite this, it has remained Quebec City's dominant station, a status it has held for the better part of its history.

In February 2018, the CRTC approved relocating the transmitter from its former studios on Myrand Street in Sainte-Foy to Édifice Marie-Guyart. The move made space for residential development and placed the transmitter alongside CIVQ-TV and CFAP-DT. Its effective radiated power was also reduced from 210 kW to 80 kW.

As of October 2022, CFCM airs a local 10-minute bulletin within the network's noon newscast, as well as two 30-minute newscasts at 5:30 and 6 p.m.

== Digital television ==
In August 2011, CFCM-DT signed on the air.
