= CKQC-FM =

Radio station in Abbotsford, British Columbia

- Abbotsford, British Columbia; Canada
- Broadcast area: Fraser Valley
- Frequency: 107.1 MHz
- Branding: Country 107.1

Programming
- Format: Country

Ownership
- Owner: Rogers Radio; (Rogers Media, Inc.)
- Sister stations: CKKS-FM, CJAX-FM, CKSR-FM

History
- First air date: August 20, 1962
- Former call signs: CFVR (1962–1994); CKMA (1994–2000); CFSR (2000–2001); CFSR-FM (2001–2005)
- Former frequencies: 1240 kHz (1962–1977); 850 kHz (1977–2001); 92.5 MHz (April–June 2002)

Technical information
- Class: A
- ERP: 1,000 watts (peak); 215 watts (average) horizontal polarization only
- HAAT: 150.5 metres (494 ft)
- Transmitter coordinates: 49.0522°N 122.249°W

Links
- Webcast: Listen Live
- Website: country1071.com

CKQC-FM (107.1 MHz) is a Canadian radio station in Abbotsford, British Columbia. Owned by Rogers Radio, a division of Rogers Sports & Media, the station airs a country format branded as Country 107.1. CFVR was established in 1962 as a semi-satellite station of CHWK. It mostly simulcast CHWK but had its own morning show. The station was a network affiliate of CBC Radio until 1981.
