= CKSR-FM =

Radio station in Chilliwack, British Columbia

- Chilliwack, British Columbia; Canada
- Broadcast area: Lower Mainland
- Frequency: 98.3 MHz
- Branding: Star 98.3

Programming
- Format: Adult contemporary

Ownership
- Owner: Rogers Radio; (Rogers Media, Inc.)
- Sister stations: CKKS-FM, CJAX-FM, CKWX, CKQC-FM

History
- First air date: June 27, 1927
- Former call signs: CHWK (1927–2000); CKSR (2000–2001)
- Former frequencies: 1210 kHz (1927–30); 665 kHz (1930–33); 780 kHz (1933–41); 1340 kHz (1941–51); 1230 kHz (1951–53); 1270 kHz (1953–2001)
- Call sign meaning: "Chilliwack Star" (broadcast area and branding)

Technical information
- Class: B
- ERP: horizontal polarization only: 2,340 watts average 5,000 watts peak
- HAAT: 210.1 metres (689 ft)
- Transmitter coordinates: 49°6′34.92″N 121°50′52.80″W
- Repeater: CFSR-FM 100.5 (Hope)

Links
- Webcast: Listen Live
- Website: starfm.com

CKSR-FM (98.3 MHz Star 98.3) is a Canadian radio station located in Chilliwack, British Columbia. The station, operating at 2,100 watts of power, is owned by Rogers Radio, a division of Rogers Sports & Media. CKSR also runs a repeater station in Hope (CFSR-FM 100.5).

== History ==
=== Early years and CBC affiliation ===
CKSR began broadcasting on June 27, 1927, as CHWK (which stood for "Chilliwack"), airing for two hours a day (noon-1 p.m. and 6-7 p.m.) at its original frequency of 1210 AM with transmission power of 5 watts. The station had been started up by original owners, radio set salesmen Casey Wells and Jack Menzies, as a response to the problems Chilliwack residents had with picking up radio signals from Vancouver due to the area's mountainous terrain and the less-sophisticated radio receivers of the time. During CHWK's early years, there were some days when the station would not go on the air if Wells and Menzies were busy selling radios; this was eventually remedied in 1929 when Jack Pilling was hired on to help run station operations.

CHWK moved to 665 AM and increased power to 100 watts in 1930, and Wells bought Menzies' ownership stake in the station in 1933, with programming geared toward the Chilliwack area's farmers. CHWK became a charter affiliate of the Canadian Radio Broadcasting Commission upon the network's formation in 1932 and later became the local affiliate when the CRBC reorganized as the Canadian Broadcasting Corporation in 1936. The station switched frequencies again to 780 AM in 1937 and increased power to 250 watts the following year. In 1940, Pilling acquired half-ownership of the station, which changed over to 1340 AM in 1941. The original CBC Radio became known as the Trans-Canada Network on January 2, 1944, when its new sister network, the Dominion Network, went on the air, and CHWK became a charter affiliate of the Dominion Network at that time.

=== Fraser Valley Radio ===
CHWK made further frequency switches over time, to 1230 AM on April 14, 1951, then to 1270 AM (with a power increase to 1000 watts) in 1952. In 1957, Fraser Valley Broadcasters Ltd. was established as the owner of CHWK, with Jack Pilling as the new company's largest shareholder. The station's power was increased to 10,000 watts in 1960. On August 20, 1962, Fraser Valley Broadcasters established CFVR in Abbotsford as a semi-satellite of CHWK, operating on 1240 AM with 250 watts of power; CFVR initially broadcast separately 6 to 9 a.m. and during the noon hour, while the balance of its programming came from Chilliwack With the move from the Park Hotel to new studios separate programming was expanded to 6 a.m. to 6 p.m. With the establishment of CFVR, Fraser Valley Broadcasters formed the regional radio network Fraser Valley Radio with CHWK and CFVR as its founding stations. Pilling retired as the majority owner and president of Fraser Valley Broadcasters in 1963.

Also, in 1962, the Dominion Network dissolved and CHWK's affiliation transferred to the main CBC Radio network.

In 1966, CHWK and CFVR parent Fraser Valley Broadcasters was under the ownership of Murdo Maclachlan, Bill Wolfe, and Bill Teetzel when Dennis Barkman purchased a one-third interest in the company by acquiring Teetzel's shares, with an option on the remaining shares of Maclachlan and Wolfe. By selling his interest to five employees; Ken Davis, Gerald Pash, Harold Roberts, Eugene Ross, and Bob Singleton, Barkman acquired the interest of MacLachlan and Wolfe and became the majority owner in 1969. Operational responsibilities were divided at both stations. At CHWK Harold Roberts was appointed program manager, Ken Davis as Sales Manager and Gene Ross as Commercial Manager. At CFVR Gerald Pash was a sales manager and Bob Singleton program manager. On May 8, 1972, CHWK got a second rebroadcaster when CKGO went on the air in Hope at 1490 AM with 250 watts, airing two hours of local programming a day with the rest from CHWK. Peter Slack was the first manager at CKGO. He died March 27, 2010, at age 60. Casey Wells, one of the co-founders of CHWK, died in Chilliwack on November 11, 1976, at age 74.

In February 1977, CFVR moved to 850 AM and increased its power to 10,000 watts, while CKGO later took over CFVR's old 1240 frequency and made a power increase to 1000 watts in the daytime, remaining at 250 at night. Jack Pilling, the former president and majority owner of Fraser Valley Broadcasters, died on July 16, 1977, at age 69. In June 1981, CHWK, CFVR and CKGO dropped their CBC affiliations when CBC set up CBYF-FM, a Chilliwack repeater station of CBU.

=== Original Star FM and the sale to Rogers ===
Bill Coombes took over from Dennis Barkman as the president of Fraser Valley Broadcasters in 1986. On October 1 that year, Fraser Valley Broadcasters put the original CKSR-FM (also identified on-air as Star FM) on the air at 107.5 in Chilliwack, with a repeater station (originally called CFSR-FM) in Abbotsford at 104.9, broadcasting a mixed adult contemporary/easy listening format.

On June 25, 1994, CFVR discontinued its adult contemporary format for oldies music and changed its call sign to CKMA (adopting the on-air brand 85 Radio MAX). Dennis Barkman, who had relinquished his interests in Fraser Valley Broadcasters some years earlier, died on March 11, 1995, of a brain tumour at the age of 62. CHWK and CKGO later began simulcasting CKMA (with CKMA's on-air brand being shortened to simply Radio MAX as all three stations adopted it as a common brand) on September 8, 1997. In August 1999, Rogers Communications bought Fraser Valley Broadcasters and its stations. On December 31, 1999, at 5 p.m., CKSR/CFSR changed its call letters to CKVX-FM (eventually to become CKCL-FM on April 8, 2004).

=== Switch to FM ===
On June 9, 2000, the CRTC gave approval to CHWK to switch to FM, to operate at 98.3 MHz. In preparation for the switch, in September that year, CHWK, CKMA, and CKGO changed call signs as well as CHWK adopted the old CKSR name, while CKMA became CFSR and CKGO changed to CKIS. On December 15, CKIS was approved to move to FM at 100.5, and CFSR got the green light on June 5, 2001, to move to 107.1 FM. On August 31, 2001, the switch took place as the stations (with CKSR as the originating broadcaster) adopted the on-air brand 98.3 Star FM and dropped their oldies format for adult contemporary; their old AM frequencies would continue simulcasting CKSR until December. Former CHWK co-owner Murdo Maclachlan died on July 8, 2003, in North Vancouver at age 93. CFSR ceased rebroadcasting CKSR on March 24, 2005, at noon as it became CKQC-FM, airing a separate schedule of contemporary country music, while the CFSR calls were transferred to CKIS. Bill Wolfe, another former co-owner of CHWK, died on June 1, 2005, at the age of 77.

In an announcement made in 2007, the historic CHWK call letters were planned to be brought back by Manitoba-based Golden West Broadcasting, which had applied to the CRTC for a licence for an FM station in Chilliwack, to operate on 89.5 FM if the application was successful. The application by Golden West Broadcasting was denied by the CRTC on May 30, 2008, in favour of an application by Radio CJVR Ltd. (later called Fabmar Communications Ltd., the owner of Melfort, Saskatchewan, station CJVR-FM, since acquired by the Jim Pattison Group), which began using the CHWK calls for its new station when it went on the air with a test signal on February 11, 2009, then officially launched on Friday, February 20 at 12:05pm.

In 2011, CKSR changed its branding slightly to Star 98.3. The station also changed its logo.

== Rebroadcasters ==
Rebroadcasters of CKSR-FM
| City of licence | Identifier | Frequency | Power | Class |
|---|---|---|---|---|
| Hope, British Columbia | CFSR-FM | 100.5 FM | 157 watts | A |
| Boston Bar, British Columbia | CFSR-FM-1 | 106.1 FM | 91 watts | A1 |

In 1980, CKGO added a rebroadcast transmitter at Boston Bar as CKGO-FM-1. It was later changed to CFSR-FM-1 at 106.1 MHz until it was deleted from the ISEDC database in 2018.

== Former logos ==
CHWK/CFVR logo, used until CFVR switched frequencies in 1977.

"Star FM" logo used until June 2011.

"Star" logo used from 2011 to 2018.

== Other stations named CKSR ==
CKSR called letters for the student radio station for the University of Alberta starting in 1970 (The "SR" stood for "Student Radio"). The station was renamed to CJSR in 1978.
