= CHWK-FM =

Radio station in Chilliwack

Coordinates: 49°06′35″N 121°50′52″W

- Chilliwack, British Columbia; Canada
- Broadcast area: Fraser Valley
- Frequency: 89.5 MHz
- Branding: 89.5 JR Country

Programming
- Format: Country

Ownership
- Owner: Jim Pattison Group
- Sister stations: CJJR-FM; CKPK-FM

History
- First air date: February 20, 2009
- Call sign meaning: "Chilliwack"; station also broadcast as "The Hawk" when it launched

Technical information
- Licensing authority: CRTC
- Class: A
- ERP: 1,600 watts
- HAAT: 188.7 metres (619 ft)

Links
- Webcast: Listen Live
- Website: 895jrcountry.ca

CHWK-FM is a Canadian radio station that broadcasts a country format at 89.5 FM in Chilliwack, British Columbia, Canada. The station is branded as 89.5 JR Country.

Owned by Pattison Media, the station was licensed to Fabmar Communications in May, 2008. The station began testing on February 11, 2009 and launched at 12:05 pm on February 20, 2009, as 89.5 The Hawk, Chilliwack's Rock Station, initially playing an active rock format, later adopting a more classic rock format. The station was also the radio home of the WHL Chilliwack Bruins from February 2009 until the team's relocation to Victoria following the 2011 season.

Glen Slingerland on Mornings from 6:00am-9am. Celine Trimarchi is Middays 9am-2pm, Dana Thompson is Afternoon Drive from 2pm-6pm, Logan Gosling is the Evening Show.

Mark Patric is General Manager and Sara Dzaman is General Sales Manager.

On June 28, 2013 at 10:00 am, the station adopted a classic hits format, and rebranded as 89.5 The Drive, beginning with a weekend-long countdown of 500 songs chosen by the listeners of the station.

On August 20, 2018, the Jim Pattison Group announced its intent to acquire Fabmar Communications pending CRTC approval.

On July 1, 2022, CHWK-FM flipped to country branded as 89.5 JR Country.

CHWK was the former call sign of a radio station in Chilliwack from 1927 until it changed its call sign to CKSR-FM in 2000.
