= CKCV =

Former radio station in Quebec City, Quebec

- Quebec City, Quebec; Canada
- Frequency: 1280 kHz
- Branding: CKCV 1280

Programming
- Format: MOR

Ownership
- Owner: Telemedia

History
- First air date: August 26, 1924
- Last air date: September 21, 1990
- Call sign meaning: Charles-A. Vandry

Technical information
- Class: B
- Power: 10,000 watts (daytime); 5,000 watts (nighttime)

Links
- Website: ckcv1280quebec.com/2017retrouvaillesckcv1280quebec.html

CKCV was a French-language Canadian radio station located in Quebec City, Quebec. It operated from 1924 to 1990.

For most of its existence the station broadcast on 1280 kHz on the AM band, using a daytime power of 10,000 watts and a nighttime power of 5,000 watts as a class B station, using a directional antenna with different patterns day and night.

CKCV went on the air on August 26, 1924 and was originally owned by Charles-A. Vandry (hence the two last letters of the station's call sign). At the time the station only used a power of 50 watts and operated on 880 kHz, sharing the frequency with CHRC.

The station changed frequencies several times. CKCV moved to 600 kHz in 1928, moved back to 880 kHz the following year, and moved to 1310 kHz in 1933. In 1936 power was increased to 100 watts. Like most stations in North America, CKCV had to move again on March 29, 1941, due to the North American Regional Broadcasting Agreement; the station landed on 1340 kHz. The station moved to 1280 kHz by 1947 and increased its power to 1,000 watts. Another power increase was implemented by 1963; CKCV now used 10,000 watts during the day and 5,000 watts at night.

Originally, it aired programming in both French and English; at one point it was an affiliate of the CBC's supplementary francophone radio network, L'Association de Radio Français, as well as a secondary affiliate of the CBC's English networks, the Trans-Canada Network and the Dominion Network. In 1962, however, all English programming was dropped.

CKCV was sold to a group of local investors in 1973 (Richard Drouin, Benoit Roberge, Jocelyne Grimard Roberge and Marthe Roberge Drouin); this sale meant that the station was no longer co-owned with rival CHRC as it had been for most of its existence. CKCV was sold again the following year, this time to Telemedia.

In 1980, the station increased its power to 50,000 watts full-time from a new site in Saint-Augustin-de-Desmaures, but CKCV was forced to move back a few years later to its old technical parameters and transmitter site in Saint-David-de-l'Auberivière (now part of Lévis) due to interference complaints.

The station was closed on September 21, 1990. CKCV's licence was revoked by the CRTC (Canadian Radio-television and Telecommunications Commission) on May 30, 1991. In a separate decision published on that date, the CRTC refused Telemedia's application to buy CHRC (at the time it was illegal for one company to own more than one AM station per market).
