= Trans-Canada Network =

Former English-language radio network of the Canadian Broadcasting Corporation

CBC Trans-Canada Network
- Type: Public broadcaster, radio network
- Country: Canada

Programming
- Format: News, public affairs, educational, cultural and entertainment programming

Ownership
- Owner: Canadian Broadcasting Corporation

History
- Launch date: 1 January 1944
- Closed: 1 October 1962 (became CBC Radio)

Coverage
- Availability: National

The Trans-Canada Network was the principal English-language radio network of the Canadian Broadcasting Corporation (CBC) from 1944 to 1962. It was created when the CBC divided its English radio service into two coast-to-coast networks: the Trans-Canada Network, which continued as the corporation's main service, and the Dominion Network, a second network built largely around privately owned affiliates.

The Trans-Canada Network carried a broad schedule of CBC programming, including news, public affairs, educational broadcasts, drama, classical music, cultural programs and some commercial programming. It was anchored by CBC-owned stations, including CBL in Toronto, while the Dominion Network was based on CJBC in Toronto and privately owned affiliates.

On 1 October 1962, the CBC consolidated the Trans-Canada and Dominion networks into a single English-language CBC Radio network. The surviving service later became known as CBC Radio, and eventually CBC Radio One.

== History ==
Before 1944, the CBC operated one main English-language radio network. During the early 1940s, pressure grew from listeners, advertisers and private stations for alternative network programming. The CBC responded by creating a second English-language network rather than allowing a privately controlled national network to develop outside CBC authority.

The new arrangement took effect on 1 January 1944. The original English network was renamed the Trans-Canada Network, while the new second service became the Dominion Network. CBL in Toronto served as the key station of the Trans-Canada Network, while CJBC became the key station of the Dominion Network. Contemporary newspaper accounts described the change as an effort to provide a clearer division between the CBC's principal public-service programming and the more commercially oriented second network.

The Trans-Canada Network remained the CBC's senior English-language radio service. Its schedule emphasized news, public affairs, talks, drama, classical music, educational programs and other cultural material, although it also carried sponsored and entertainment programming. The Dominion Network, by contrast, was intended to provide an additional outlet for lighter entertainment and commercial programs, including some American network material.

The division between the two networks was not absolute. Both networks carried Canadian programs and both aired commercials. The difference lay mainly in scheduling, tone and station structure. The Trans-Canada Network was the CBC's main national network, while the Dominion Network was built around CJBC and a group of private affiliates that wanted greater access to commercially attractive programming.

== Relationship with the Dominion Network ==
The creation of the Dominion Network altered the structure of CBC English radio. The Dominion Network was formed with CJBC as its Toronto key station and a large group of private affiliates across Canada. The Canadian Communications Foundation states that CJBC was the only CBC-owned station on the Dominion Network, with the other stations privately owned. In 1945, the CBC listed 29 Dominion basic stations, including CJBC, CFCF Montreal, CKRC Winnipeg, CFCN Calgary, CFRN Edmonton, CJOR Vancouver and CJVI Victoria.

The Trans-Canada Network, by contrast, was more closely identified with the CBC's owned-and-operated stations and with the corporation's core national programming. In communities where the CBC did not own a station, private affiliates carried required blocks of CBC programming to fill gaps in national coverage.

== Consolidation in 1962 ==
The two-network structure ended in 1962. The CBC dissolved the Dominion Network and consolidated its English-language radio service into a single CBC Radio network. Statistics Canada's account of the change described 1 October 1962 as the inauguration of a new CBC Radio Network that consolidated the English-language Trans-Canada and Dominion networks. It stated that the purpose was to provide a more balanced daily schedule of spoken-word and music programming and that many programs were carried over microwave facilities, improving network quality and reliability.

After the merger, some former Dominion affiliates continued carrying CBC Radio programming, while others became independent as the CBC expanded its own owned-and-operated stations and relay transmitters. The Canadian Communications Foundation notes that the single network linked CBC-owned stations and enough private stations to fill remaining national coverage gaps.

== Later development ==
After 1962, the former Trans-Canada Network continued as the main English CBC Radio service. The CBC also experimented with FM network broadcasting. An experimental FM network between Toronto, Ottawa and Montreal was closed on 31 October 1962 because of budget restrictions, but the experience informed later FM development.

The CBC later established a separate English FM network, which began operating in the 1970s and became known as CBC Stereo in 1975. The original English radio service was later branded CBC Radio One, while the FM music service became CBC Radio Two and later CBC Music.

== See also ==
- CBC Radio One
- CBC Music
- Dominion Network
- Canadian Broadcasting Corporation
- History of broadcasting in Canada
