= CFTM-DT =

Television station in Montreal, Quebec, Canada

- Montreal, Quebec; Canada
- Channels: Digital: 11 (VHF); Virtual: 10
- Branding: TVA (general); TVA Nouvelles (newscasts)

Programming
- Affiliations: 10.1: TVA

Ownership
- Owner: Groupe TVA Inc.

History
- First air date: February 19, 1961
- Former affiliations: Independent (1961–1971)
- Call sign meaning: Canal Francophone Télé-Métropole

Technical information
- Licensing authority: CRTC
- ERP: 11 kW
- HAAT: 292 m (958 ft)
- Transmitter coordinates: 45°30′20″N 73°35′30″W

Links
- Website: TVA

CFTM-DT (channel 10) is a television station in Montreal, Quebec, Canada, serving as the flagship station of the French-language network TVA. Owned by Groupe TVA, the station has studios in the Journal de Montréal building on Rue Frontenac in the Ville-Marie borough of Montreal, and its transmitter is located on Voie Camillien-Houde (near Mount Royal).

== History ==
CFTM-TV's third logo used from 1969 until 1978, as "CFTM 10".

It opened on February 19, 1961, a few weeks after CFCF-TV went on the air for the first time. It was owned by Joseph Alexandre de Sève and his company, Télé-Métropole. At first, it relied primarily on kinescopes from RTL, and also from Télé Monte Carlo; however, it was not long before it settled into a more peculiar and local form. On April 14, 1963, CFTM started sharing programs with CJPM-TV in Chicoutimi (now Saguenay) in the Saguenay–Lac-Saint-Jean region on the day the latter station signed on. They were joined by CFCM-TV in Quebec City in 1964. This was the informal beginning of TVA, though the network wasn't officially established until September 12, 1971. When de Sève died in 1968, the city government renamed the street in front of CFTM's studios rue Alexandre de Sève in his honour.

CFTM has always been by far the largest station in the TVA network. As such, it dominated the network long before Télé-Métropole bought majority control of TVA in 1990. At one point, CFTM produced as much as 90 percent of TVA's programming. Even today, TVA's network feed is little more than a retransmission of CFTM. Whenever CFTM has to interrupt its programming for breaking news or weather alerts in Montreal, the entire network usually gets interrupted as well.

CFTM-TV was essentially available on satellite beginning November 1, 1981, as "TCTV", carried via Cancom by cable television operators across Canada, though not in most major cities. TCTV carried mainly the same programs as CFTM, but with some local news and programming from other TVA affiliates.

The TCTV service ended when the Canadian Radio-television and Telecommunications Commission (CRTC) approved TVA for a national network license in 1998. Since May 1, 1999, all Canadian cable companies have been required to carry a TVA station. CFTM is the affiliate carried in most markets outside of Quebec—excepting some markets in Northern Ontario, Eastern Ontario and New Brunswick, which have long carried the stations in adjacent markets. The station also provides a time-shifted feed for cable companies in western Canada, delayed three hours after the original broadcast, matching up with Pacific Time.

In May 2025, CFTM moved to the Journal de Montreal building on Rue Frontenac, which it shares with Qub Radio and the TVA network.

== Technical information ==
=== Subchannel ===
Subchannel of CFTM-DT
Subchannel	Res.	Short name	Programming
10.1	1080i	CFTM-DT	TVA

=== Analog-to-digital conversion ===
CFTM received CRTC approval in March 2006 for its request to broadcast digitally on UHF channel 59 and was granted a requested extension to August 31, 2009, to launch this service but the launch never occurred. On July 6, 2009, as part of a license renewal hearing, TVA was granted a second extension in which to launch CFTM-DT.

During the analogue television shutdown and digital conversion, which took place on August 31, 2011, CFTM silenced its analogue transmitter on September 1, 2011, at 12:01 a.m. during a movie's airing and began broadcasting a digital signal a few minutes later on its old analog channel number, 10.
