= List of assets owned by Corus Entertainment =

Corus Entertainment assets

This is a list of assets owned by Corus Entertainment, a Canadian multimedia broadcasting company. Approximately 80% of the voting control in Corus is held by the family of JR Shaw. The same family also owned about 80% of the voting rights in Shaw Communications, for a list of former Shaw assets, see list of assets owned by Shaw Communications.

The company's portfolio of multimedia encompasses 25 specialty television services, 37 radio stations, 15 conventional television stations, a global content business, digital assets, live events, children's book publishing, animation software, broadcasting and media services.

== Television ==
=== Conventional television ===
- Global Television Network
  - Global News
  - CIII - Toronto, Ontario (First aired 1974 with intentions of starting national network, came under partial Canwest ownership in 1977. Acquired from Shaw Media in 2016)
  - CKND - Winnipeg, Manitoba (Canwest owned in 1985, acquired from Shaw in 2016)
  - CFRE - Regina, Saskatchewan (Canwest owned in 1987, acquired from Shaw in 2016)
  - CFSK - Saskatoon, Saskatchewan (Canwest owned in 1987, acquired from Shaw in 2016)
  - CIHF - Halifax, Nova Scotia (Canwest owned in 1994, acquired from Shaw in 2016)
  - CHNB - Saint John, New Brunswick (Canwest owned in 1994, acquired from Shaw in 2016)
  - CKMI - Montreal, Quebec (Canwest owned and Global Network launched in 1997, acquired from Shaw in 2016)
  - CICT - Calgary, Alberta (O&O since 2000, acquired from Shaw in 2016)
  - CISA - Lethbridge, Alberta (O&O since 2000, acquired from Shaw in 2016)
  - CITV - Edmonton, Alberta (O&O since 2000, acquired from Shaw in 2016)
  - CHAN - Vancouver, British Columbia (O&O since 2001, acquired from Shaw in 2016)
  - CHBC - Kelowna, British Columbia (O&O since 2009, acquired from Shaw in 2016)
  - CKWS - Kingston, Ontario (O&O since 2018, acquired from Power Broadcasting in 2000)
  - CHEX - Peterborough, Ontario (O&O since 2018, acquired from Power Broadcasting in 2000)
  - CHEX-2 - Oshawa, Ontario (O&O since 2018, acquired from Power Broadcasting in 2000)

=== Specialty channels ===
News

- Global News 24/7
- Global News: BC 1

Entertainment

- CMT (90%)
- DejaView
- DTOUR
- Flavour Network
- Home Network
- MovieTime
- Showcase
- Slice
- W Network
- Licensed by A+E Global Media
  - Crime & Investigation
  - History
  - History2
  - Lifetime
- Licensed by The Walt Disney Company
  - National Geographic (64%)
  - National Geographic Wild (64%)
- Licensed by Skydance
  - Adult Swim

Kids and family

- Treehouse
- YTV
- Licensed by The Walt Disney Company
  - Disney Channel
- Licensed by Skydance
  - Boomerang
  - Cartoon Network

French-language channels

- Historia
- SériesPlus
- Télétoon
  - Télétoon la nuit

== Corus Radio ==
City	Province	Call sign	Frequency	Band	Branding/format	Format
Barrie	Ontario	CHAY	93.1	FM	Fresh Radio 93.1	Top 40/CHR
Barrie	Ontario	CIQB	101.1	FM	Big 101	Classic hits
Brampton	Ontario	CFNY	102.1	FM	102.1 The Edge	Modern rock
Burlington	Ontario	CJXY	107.9	FM	Y108	Active rock
Calgary	Alberta	CFGQ	107.3	FM	107.3 The Edge	Classic alternative
Calgary	Alberta	CHQR	770	AM	QR Calgary	News/talk
Calgary	Alberta	CKRY	105.1	FM	Country 105	Country
Collingwood	Ontario	CKCB	95.1	FM	The Peak 95.1 FM	Adult contemporary
Cornwall	Ontario	CFLG	104.5	FM	Fresh Radio 104.5	Top 40/CHR
Cornwall	Ontario	CJSS	101.9	FM	Boom 101.9	Classic hits
Edmonton	Alberta	CHED	880	AM	880 CHED	News/talk
Edmonton	Alberta	CKNG	92.5	FM	Chuck @ 92.5	Adult hits
Edmonton	Alberta	CISN	103.9	FM	103.9 CISN Country	Country
Guelph	Ontario	CIMJ	106.1	FM	Magic 106.1	Hot adult contemporary
Guelph	Ontario	CJOY	1460	AM	1460 CJOY	Classic hits
Hamilton	Ontario	CING	95.3	FM	Energy 95.3	Hot adult contemporary
Kingston	Ontario	CFMK	96.3	FM	Big 96.3	Classic rock
Kingston	Ontario	CKWS	104.3	FM	Fresh Radio 104.3	Hot adult contemporary
Kitchener	Ontario	CJDV	107.5	FM	107.5 Dave Rocks	Active rock
Kitchener	Ontario	CKBT	91.5	FM	The Beat 91.5	Top 40/CHR
London	Ontario	CFPL	980	AM	980 CFPL	News/talk
London	Ontario	CFPL-FM	95.9	FM	FM96	Modern rock
Ottawa	Ontario	CJOT	99.7	FM	Boom 99.7	Classic hits
Ottawa	Ontario	CKQB	106.9	FM	Jump 106.9	Top 40/CHR
Peterborough	Ontario	CKRU	100.5	FM	Fresh Radio 100.5	Hot adult contemporary
Peterborough	Ontario	CKWF	101.5	FM	The Wolf 101.5	Active rock
St. Thomas	Ontario	CFHK	103.1	FM	Fresh Radio 103.1	Hot adult contemporary
Toronto	Ontario	CFIQ	640	AM	640 Toronto	News/talk
Toronto	Ontario	CILQ	107.1	FM	Q107	Mainstream rock
Vancouver	British Columbia	CFMI	101.1	FM	Rock 101	Active rock
Vancouver	British Columbia	CFOX	99.3	FM	The World Famous CFOX	Alternative rock
Vancouver	British Columbia	CKNW	730	AM	730 CKNW	News/talk
Winnipeg	Manitoba	CJKR	97.5	FM	Power 97	Classic alternative
Winnipeg	Manitoba	CJOB	680	AM	680 CJOB	News/talk
Winnipeg	Manitoba	CFPG	99.1	FM	Country 99	Country
Woodstock	Ontario	CKDK	103.9	FM	Country 104	Country

== Other assets ==
- B5media (minority stake) — online publisher
- Corus Airtime Sales

Marketing and advertising

- Corus Tempo — a full-service marketing and creative team within the Corus National Sales group.
- Cynch — a self-serve platform for buying TV campaigns online.
- Kin Community Canada — an influencer marketing platform.
- so.da — a full-service digital media agency.

Original content

- Corus Studios — Corus Entertainment's "premium content studio."
- Aircraft Pictures Ltd. (majority stake) — film and television entertainment.
- Kids Can Press — the largest Canadian-owned children’s book publishing company.
- Nelvana — a production and distribution company of children's animation programs.
  - Redknot — a joint venture with Skydance Corporation

Streaming

- Curiouscast — podcast network
- Global TV App — a TV Everywhere for Global TV Network subscribers.
- STACKTV — a subscription video streaming package offered by Corus through Amazon Prime Video Channels
- Teletoon+ — streaming service for Cartoon Network, Warner Bros. Animation, and Peacock Kids content
- Vivéo — French-language streaming service

== Former assets ==
=== Corus Radio ===
City	Province	Call sign	Frequency	Band	Year	Disposition
Hamilton	Ontario	CHML	900	AM	2024	Closed
Cornwall	Ontario	CJUL	1220	AM	2010	Closed
Edmonton	Alberta	CHQT	880	AM	2024	Closed; its frequency was assumed by CHED
Red Deer	Alberta	CIZZ	98.9	FM	2005	Acquired by Newcap Radio
Red Deer	Alberta	CKGY	95.5	FM	2005	Acquired by Newcap Radio
Oshawa	Ontario	CKDO	1580	AM	2003	Acquired by Durham Radio Inc.
Vancouver	British Columbia	CKGO	730	AM	2025	Closed; its frequency was assumed by CKNW
Oshawa	Ontario	CKGE	94.9	FM	2003	Acquired by Durham Radio Inc.
Amqui	Quebec	CFVM	99.9	FM	2013	Acquired by Bell Media; subsequently sold to Arsenal Media in 2025
Drummondville	Quebec	CJDM	92.1	FM	2013	Acquired by Bell Media; subsequently sold to Arsenal Media in 2025
Gatineau	Quebec	CJRC	104.7	FM	2010	Sold to Cogeco
Lévis	Quebec	CFEL	102.1	FM	2010	Sold to Cogeco; acquired by Leclerc Communication in 2011
Montreal	Quebec	CFQR	92.5	FM	2010	Sold to Cogeco
Montreal	Quebec	CKOI	96.9	FM	2010	Sold to Cogeco
Montreal	Quebec	CINF	690	AM	2010	Closed
Montreal	Quebec	CINW	940	AM	2010	Closed
Montreal	Quebec	CKAC	730	AM	2010	Sold to Cogeco
Montreal	Quebec	CHMP	98.5	FM	2011	Sold to Cogeco
Quebec City	Quebec	CHRC	800	AM	2008	Sold to Michel Cadrin, Jacques Tanguay and Patrick Roy; closed in 2012
Quebec City	Quebec	CFOM	102.9	FM	2010	Sold to Cogeco
Quebec City	Quebec	CJEC	91.9	FM	2012	Acquired by Leclerc Communication
Rimouski	Quebec	CIKI	98.7	FM	2011	Acquired by Bell Media; subsequently sold to Arsenal Media in 2025
Rimouski	Quebec	CJOI	102.9	FM	2013	Acquired by Bell Media; subsequently sold to Arsenal Media in 2025
Saguenay	Quebec	CKRS	98.3	FM	2011	Acquired by Attraction Radio, now Arsenal Media; subsequently acquired by Cogeco
Saint-Jérôme	Quebec	CIME	103.9	FM	2011	Sold to Cogeco
Saint-Jean-sur-Richelieu	Quebec	CFZZ	104.1	FM	2005	Sold to Astral Media, which was subsequently acquired by Bell Media; later sold to Arsenal Media in 2025
Sherbrooke	Quebec	CHLT	107.7	FM	2010	Sold to Cogeco
Sherbrooke	Quebec	CKOY	104.5	FM	2010	Sold to Cogeco; closed in 2011
Sherbrooke	Quebec	CKTS	900	AM	2006	Closed
Trois-Rivières	Quebec	CHLN	106.9	FM	2010	Sold to Cogeco

=== TV and streaming ===
Asset	Type or market	Corus interest	Disposition
ABC Spark	Television channel		Shut down
Action	Television channel		Replaced by Adult Swim
CHCH	Hamilton, Ontario	Part of CH / E!	Acquired by Channel Zero
CJNT	Montreal, Quebec	Part of CH / E!	Acquired by Channel Zero; subsequently acquired by Rogers Media and operated as a Citytv owned-and-operated station
CHEK	Victoria, British Columbia	Part of CH / E!	Acquired by CHEK Media Group
CHCA	Red Deer, Alberta	Part of CH / E!	Ceased broadcasting on August 31, 2009, following the shutdown of CH / E!
Beyblade	North American media license only		Sold by Nelvana to d-rights International in 2014, following declining audiences and possibly zero ownership or stake in the real Beyblade franchise.
BBC Canada	Television channel	80%	Shut down
Cartoon Network (Canada)	Television channel	Original incarnation	Replaced by Boomerang (Canada)
Cooking Channel (Canada)	Television channel		Shut down
Discovery Kids	Television channel		Replaced by Nickelodeon Canada on most television providers
Disney Jr.	Television channel		Shut down; its programming moved to Disney Channel
Disney XD	Television channel		Shut down
Dusk	Television channel		Replaced by ABC Spark
Family Channel	Television channel	50%	Acquired by Astral Media in 2001; subsequently acquired by WildBrain
Score Media	Media company	25.93%	Shares sold in 1999
The Score Television Network	Television channel	Interest held through Score Media	Renamed Sportsnet 360; subsequently acquired by Rogers Media
Fine Living	Television channel		Replaced by DIY Network on most television providers
Movie Central	Premium television service		Replaced by the western feed of Bell Media's The Movie Network
Encore Avenue	Premium television service		Replaced by the western feed of Bell Media's The Movie Network Encore
HBO Canada	Premium television service	Western feed	Acquired by Bell Media
IFC (Canada)	Television channel		Shut down
CoolTV	Television channel		Shut down
Edge TV	Television channel		Shut down
Fox Sports World Canada	Television channel		Shut down
X-Treme Sports	Television channel		Shut down
Country Canada	Television channel		Acquired by the Canadian Broadcasting Corporation in 2002; subsequently acquired by Blue Ant Media and renamed Cottage Life
Documentary Channel	Television channel		Acquired by the Canadian Broadcasting Corporation
KidsCo	International television channel	43.8%	Interest sold
Leonardo World	Television channel		Shut down
Video Italia	Television channel		Shut down
Qubo	Children's television service		Acquired by Ion Media Networks
La Chaîne Disney	Television channel		Shut down
Locomotion	Latin American television channel		Acquired by Sony Pictures Entertainment and replaced by Animax
Magnolia Network (Canada)	Television channel		Shut down; subsequently relaunched by Rogers Sports & Media as a new discretionary service
Max Trax	Digital music service		Subsequently became part of Stingray Music
Nickelodeon	Television channel		Shut down
Nick+	Streaming service		Shut down and replaced by Teletoon+
OWN (Canada)	Television channel		Shut down
Sundance Channel (Canada)	Television channel		Shut down
Teletoon	Television channel		Replaced by the current incarnation of Cartoon Network (Canada)
Teletoon Retro	Television channel		Replaced by Disney Channel (Canada) and Cartoon Network (Canada)
Télétoon Rétro	Television channel		Replaced by La Chaîne Disney
Cosmopolitan TV	Television channel		Shut down
Network Ten	Australian television network	Minority shareholding	Shares sold in 2009
MediaWorks New Zealand	New Zealand media company	Minority shareholding	Shares sold
FYI (Canada)	Television channel		Shut down
TLN Media Group	Media company	Controlling interest	Acquired by TLN Media Group
EuroWorld Sport	Television channel	50.5%	Interest held through TLN Media Group
Mediaset Italia	Television channel	50.5%	Interest held through TLN Media Group
Mediaset TG24	Television channel	50.5%	Interest held through TLN Media Group
Telebimbi	Television channel	50.5%	Interest held through TLN Media Group
Telelatino	Television channel	50.5%	Interest held through TLN Media Group
TeleNiños	Television channel	50.5%	Interest held through TLN Media Group
Univision Canada	Television channel	50.5%	Interest held through TLN Media Group

=== Original content ===
- Toon Boom — acquired by International Media Company

=== Publishing ===
- Klutz — now owned by Scholastic

== See also ==
- List of assets owned by Shaw Communications
