= Corus Radio =

Canadian radio broadcaster

- Type: Division
- Industry: Radio broadcasting
- Predecessor: Radio assets of Shaw Communications, Power Broadcasting and Western International Communications
- Founded: 1999; 27 years ago
- Headquarters: Corus Quay, Toronto, Ontario, Canada
- Parent: Corus Entertainment
- Divisions: Corus Talk Radio Network; Curiouscast
- Website: corusent.com

Corus Radio is the radio broadcasting and audio division of Corus Entertainment. It owns and operates English-language AM and FM stations in British Columbia, Alberta, Manitoba and Ontario. Its other assets include the Corus Talk Radio Network and the Curiouscast podcast network. As of 2026, Corus owned 36 radio stations.

== History ==
Corus Radio originated with the radio properties of Shaw Communications, which were transferred to Corus Entertainment when the company was established in 1999. Corus expanded in 2000 through its acquisitions of the broadcasting assets of Power Broadcasting and several radio stations formerly owned by Western International Communications.

The company formerly operated a group of French-language stations through Corus Québec, most of which were sold to Cogeco in 2010. Corus later expanded its digital audio operations through Curiouscast, a podcast network featuring programming produced by Corus Radio, Global News and independent producers.

Corus operated 39 AM and FM stations in 2023, alongside Curiouscast. Its portfolio was reduced to 36 stations following the 2024 closures of CHQT in Edmonton, CKGO in Vancouver and CHML in Hamilton.

== Operations and brands ==
Corus stations broadcast news and talk, contemporary hit radio, adult contemporary, classic hits, country, rock and alternative rock formats. Brands used by multiple stations include:

- Fresh Radio, used by contemporary hit radio and hot adult contemporary stations in Ontario;
- Boom, used by classic hits stations;
- The Edge, used by alternative and classic alternative stations;
- Big, used by stations in Barrie and Kingston; and
- locally identified Country brands.

Other station brands include Q107, Rock 101, CFOX, FM96, Y108, Energy 95.3, Magic 106.1 and 91.5 The Beat.

The Corus Talk Radio Network distributes spoken-word programming among Corus's news and talk stations in Vancouver (CKNW), Edmonton (CHED), Calgary (CHQR), Winnipeg (CJOB), Toronto (CFIQ) and London (CFPL). Curiouscast distributes original podcasts and on-demand versions of programming produced by Corus properties.

== Stations ==
As of 2026, Corus Radio owns and operates 36 stations.

== Current stations ==
City	Province	Call sign	Frequency	Band	Branding/format	Format	Provenance
Barrie	Ontario	CHAY	93.1	FM	Fresh Radio 93.1	Top 40/CHR	Acquired by Shaw, 1990
Barrie	Ontario	CIQB	101.1	FM	Big 101	Classic hits	Acquired by Corus from Power Broadcasting, 2000
Brampton	Ontario	CFNY	102.1	FM	102.1 The Edge	Modern rock	Acquired by Shaw, 1994
Burlington	Ontario	CJXY	107.9	FM	Y108	Active rock	Acquired by Corus from WIC, 2000
Calgary	Alberta	CFGQ	107.3	FM	107.3 The Edge	Classic alternative	Acquired by Corus from WIC, 2000
Calgary	Alberta	CHQR	770	AM	QR Calgary	News/talk	Acquired by Corus from WIC, 2000
Calgary	Alberta	CKRY	105.1	FM	Country 105	Country	Acquired by Shaw, 1997
Collingwood	Ontario	CKCB	95.1	FM	The Peak 95.1 FM	Adult contemporary	Acquired by Corus from Power Broadcasting, 2000
Cornwall	Ontario	CFLG	104.5	FM	Fresh Radio 104.5	Top 40/CHR	Acquired by Corus from Power Broadcasting, 2000
Cornwall	Ontario	CJSS	101.9	FM	Boom 101.9	Classic hits	Acquired by Corus from Power Broadcasting, 2000
Edmonton	Alberta	CHED	880	AM	880 CHED	News/talk	Acquired by Corus from WIC, 2000
Edmonton	Alberta	CKNG	92.5	FM	Chuck @ 92.5	Adult hits	Acquired by Corus from WIC, 2000
Edmonton	Alberta	CISN	103.9	FM	103.9 CISN Country	Country	Acquired by Shaw, 1988
Guelph	Ontario	CIMJ	106.1	FM	Magic 106.1	Hot adult contemporary	Acquired by Corus from Power Broadcasting, 2000
Guelph	Ontario	CJOY	1460	AM	1460 CJOY	Classic hits	Acquired by Corus from Power Broadcasting, 2000
Hamilton	Ontario	CING	95.3	FM	Energy 95.3	Hot adult contemporary	Acquired by Shaw, 1997
Kingston	Ontario	CFMK	96.3	FM	Big 96.3	Classic rock	Acquired by Corus from Power Broadcasting, 2000
Kingston	Ontario	CKWS	104.3	FM	Fresh Radio 104.3	Hot adult contemporary	Acquired by Corus from Power Broadcasting, 2000
Kitchener	Ontario	CJDV	107.5	FM	107.5 Dave Rocks	Active rock	Acquired by Corus from Canwest, 2007
Kitchener	Ontario	CKBT	91.5	FM	The Beat 91.5	Top 40/CHR	Acquired by Corus from Canwest, 2007
London	Ontario	CFPL	980	AM	980 CFPL	News/talk	Acquired by Shaw from Blackburn Radio, 1999
London	Ontario	CFPL-FM	95.9	FM	FM96	Modern rock	Acquired by Shaw from Blackburn Radio, 1999
Ottawa	Ontario	CJOT	99.7	FM	Boom 99.7	Classic hits	Acquired by Corus from Bell Media (Astral divestiture), 2014
Ottawa	Ontario	CKQB	106.9	FM	Jump 106.9	Top 40/CHR	Acquired by Corus from Bell Media (Astral divestiture), 2014
Peterborough	Ontario	CKRU	100.5	FM	Fresh Radio 100.5	Hot adult contemporary	Acquired by Corus from Power Broadcasting, 2000
Peterborough	Ontario	CKWF	101.5	FM	The Wolf 101.5	Active rock	Acquired by Corus from Power Broadcasting, 2000
St. Thomas	Ontario	CFHK	103.1	FM	Fresh Radio 103.1	Hot adult contemporary	Acquired by Shaw from Blackburn Radio, 1999
Toronto	Ontario	CFIQ	640	AM	640 Toronto	News/talk	Acquired by Corus from WIC, 2000
Toronto	Ontario	CILQ	107.1	FM	Q107	Mainstream rock	Acquired by Corus from WIC, 2000
Vancouver	British Columbia	CFMI	101.1	FM	Rock 101	Active rock	Acquired by Corus from WIC, 2000
Vancouver	British Columbia	CFOX	99.3	FM	The World Famous CFOX	Alternative rock	Acquired by Shaw, 1992
Vancouver	British Columbia	CKNW	730	AM	730 CKNW	News/talk	Acquired by Corus from WIC, 2000
Winnipeg	Manitoba	CJKR	97.5	FM	Power 97	Classic alternative	Acquired by Corus from WIC, 2000
Winnipeg	Manitoba	CJOB	680	AM	680 CJOB	News/talk	Acquired by Corus from WIC, 2000
Winnipeg	Manitoba	CFPG	99.1	FM	Country 99	Country	Acquired by Corus from Canwest, 2007
Woodstock	Ontario	CKDK	103.9	FM	Country 104	Country	Acquired by Shaw, 1991

== Former stations ==
City	Province	Call sign	Frequency	Band	Year	Disposition
Hamilton	Ontario	CHML	900	AM	2024	Closed
Cornwall	Ontario	CJUL	1220	AM	2010	Closed
Edmonton	Alberta	CHQT	880	AM	2024	Closed; its frequency was assumed by CHED
Red Deer	Alberta	CIZZ	98.9	FM	2005	Acquired by Newcap Radio
Red Deer	Alberta	CKGY	95.5	FM	2005	Acquired by Newcap Radio
Oshawa	Ontario	CKDO	1580	AM	2003	Acquired by Durham Radio Inc.
Vancouver	British Columbia	CKGO	730	AM	2025	Closed; its frequency was assumed by CKNW
Oshawa	Ontario	CKGE	94.9	FM	2003	Acquired by Durham Radio Inc.
Amqui	Quebec	CFVM	99.9	FM	2005	Sold to Astral Media, which was subsequently acquired by Bell Media; later sold to Arsenal Media in 2025
Drummondville	Quebec	CJDM	92.1	FM	2005	Sold to Astral Media, which was subsequently acquired by Bell Media; later sold to Arsenal Media in 2025
Gatineau	Quebec	CJRC	104.7	FM	2010	Sold to Cogeco
Lévis	Quebec	CFEL	102.1	FM	2010	Sold to Cogeco; acquired by Leclerc Communication in 2011
Montreal	Quebec	CFQR	92.5	FM	2010	Sold to Cogeco
Montreal	Quebec	CKOI	96.9	FM	2010	Sold to Cogeco
Montreal	Quebec	CINF	690	AM	2010	Closed
Montreal	Quebec	CINW	940	AM	2010	Closed
Montreal	Quebec	CKAC	730	AM	2010	Sold to Cogeco
Montreal	Quebec	CHMP	98.5	FM	2011	Sold to Cogeco
Quebec City	Quebec	CHRC	800	AM	2008	Sold to Michel Cadrin, Jacques Tanguay and Patrick Roy; closed in 2012
Quebec City	Quebec	CFOM	102.9	FM	2010	Sold to Cogeco
Quebec City	Quebec	CJEC	91.9	FM	2012	Acquired by Leclerc Communication
Rimouski	Quebec	CIKI	98.7	FM	2005	Sold to Astral Media, which was subsequently acquired by Bell Media; later sold to Arsenal Media in 2025
Rimouski	Quebec	CJOI	102.9	FM	2005	Sold to Astral Media, which was subsequently acquired by Bell Media; later sold to Arsenal Media in 2025
Saguenay	Quebec	CKRS	98.3	FM	2011	Acquired by Attraction Radio, now Arsenal Media; subsequently acquired by Cogeco
Saint-Jérôme	Quebec	CIME	103.9	FM	2011	Sold to Cogeco
Saint-Jean-sur-Richelieu	Quebec	CFZZ	104.1	FM	2005	Sold to Astral Media, which was subsequently acquired by Bell Media; later sold to Arsenal Media in 2025
Sherbrooke	Quebec	CHLT	107.7	FM	2010	Sold to Cogeco
Sherbrooke	Quebec	CKOY	104.5	FM	2010	Sold to Cogeco; closed in 2011
Sherbrooke	Quebec	CKTS	900	AM	2006	Closed
Trois-Rivières	Quebec	CHLN	106.9	FM	2010	Sold to Cogeco

== See also ==
- Corus Entertainment
- List of assets owned by Corus Entertainment
- Global News
