= CHEX =

Chex is a breakfast cereal

CHEX or Chex may also refer to:

- CHEX-TV, a television station (channel 12) licensed to Peterborough, Ontario, Canada
- CHEX-TV-2, a television station (channel 22) licensed to Oshawa, Ontario, Canada
- CKRU-FM, a radio station (100.5 FM) licensed to Peterborough, Ontario, Canada, which held the call sign CHEX from 1942 to 1992
- CKWF-FM, a radio station (101.5 FM) licensed to Peterborough, Ontario, Canada, which held the call sign CHEX-FM from 1947 to 1976
- Chex, the main character of Kris Straubs Checkerboard Nightmare web-cartoon
