= ExploreMusic =

Canadian multimedia project

- ExploreMusic logo
- Genre: Radio show
- Running time: 30 minutes
- Country of origin: Canada
- Language: English
- Home station: 102.1 The Edge
- Syndicates: Y108, FM96, Power 97, The Fox, Live 88.5, Rock 101.9, X92.9, SONiC 102.9, The Wolf 101.5, 103.3 The Edge, X103
- TV adaptations: ExploreMusic TV
- Hosted by: Alan Cross
- Created by: David Huszar, Alan Cross, Ira Haberman
- Written by: Alan Cross
- Produced by: Ira Haberman, Mike Sullivan; Andrew Dick
- Executive producer: David Huszar
- Edited by: Nathalia Ribeiro
- Recording studio: Toronto, Ontario
- Original release: October 6, 2008
- Website: http://www.exploremusic.com/
- Podcast: iTunes; XML

ExploreMusic is a Canadian multimedia rock music recommendation project run by Corus Interactive and Integrated Solutions, the online arm of Corus Radio. It consists of a website, a syndicated radio show, and a weekly TV show that offers exposure to songs and artists with the vision of providing "context, perspective, recommendation and discovery of music that’s new (or new to you)." ExploreMusic achieves this through artist interviews, exclusive performances, music news, album reviews, and lists of recommended songs that are presented on a daily and weekly basis.

The program was first broadcast on 6 October 2008, and is heard on radio stations across Canada. It has a weekly audience of approximately one million. The program is also syndicated in the United States. A television adaptation of the program currently airs on Aux.

== Creation ==
Prior to the launch of ExploreMusic, there had been a number of discussions within Corus about the need to update the concept of the radio DJ as the trusted filter for new music. With online being the first choice of more and more people looking for new music, the decision was made to create a service where "real people, real passionate music fans, could recommend music to other real passionate music fans, without any sort of mechanical or electronic filters." The concept was inspired by the success of Pandora and Last.fm. However, while Pandora and Last.fm work on complex algorithms, ExploreMusic was designed as a place where music fans could turn to discover new music and information about the artists involved, as well as be encouraged to make recommendations themselves with the goal of creating conversation and community. On 1 July 2008, Alan Cross, the host of The Ongoing History of New Music and former Program Director of Toronto radio station 102.1 The Edge, took the position of senior program director at Corus Interactive and Integrated Solutions (then known as Splice). Planning and development continued through the summer.

The program was first broadcast on 6 October 2008 on 102.1 The Edge in Toronto, Y108 in Hamilton, FM96 in London, Power 97 in Winnipeg, and The Fox in Vancouver. The show has since been included on Live 88.5 in Ottawa, Rock 101.9 in Cornwall, X92.9 in Calgary, SONiC 102.9 in Edmonton, and The Wolf 101.5 in Peterborough, Ontario, with plans to branch out to more affiliates in the future. The program began syndication in the United States after ExploreMusic partnered with Friday Morning Quarterback. It currently airs on two US radio stations, 103.3 The Edge in Buffalo, and X103 in Indianapolis. An estimated one million people listen to the program each week in Canada.

== Program ==
Five thirty-minute radio shows are produced and distributed each week. Meetings to determine the program content are held once a week. Each person attending the meeting brings a list of five songs, two that have been newly released and three that are a year or more older. They discuss the tracks and decide which ones to use on the broadcast, and which to add to the website. Cross noted that "we're appreciative of everybody's diverse tastes. The whole idea is to introduce people to music that is new and new to them." The programs are written and hosted by Alan Cross, and are recorded in Toronto, Ontario. The four pillars driving the show are context, perspective, recommendation, and discovery. Every song and story featured on ExploreMusic is created in accordance with those four pillars.

The typical show content includes the "Big new song of the day", "The Music News Countdown", which contains the program’s top five music stories of the day, the music recommendation "The Five Songs You Gotta Hear Today", and an abbreviated interview with a musical artist, which frequently includes an exclusive performance of a song.

In January 2009, ExploreMusic TV debuted on BiteTV, a Canadian digital tier channel aimed at males 18-34. Hosted by Cross, the programme is a weekly roundtable discussion on music issues with guests from various parts of the music industry. It currently airs on Aux, produced in cooperation with Corus Entertainment Inc. and GlassBOX Television Inc. The show is currently in its second season on the channel.

=== Web content ===
The topics and categories on the ExploreMusic radio show are also included on the website, often enhanced by links, images, additional text, audio, and video. The site is presented in blog format, with posts tagged as "News", "Reviews", "New Releases", "WTF", and other categories. ExploreMusic TV is seen through the website, as are audio and video podcasts of the previous shows. Every song featured on the website is linked to a sample of the track. The radio program is condensed into a daily podcast; music from the program is not included due to copyright restrictions, but the full interview with the musical artist is included. Web content is available on the BlackBerry and Windows Mobile through an application developed by Viigo Inc. This application allows users to access the ExploreMusic website and Alan Cross's Twitter posts. Vice-President of Corus Interactive David Huszar noted that "People aren't buying radio receivers anymore but they're certainly buying smartphones... it's so important for all of our radio entities to be available on the appliances that people are using nowadays to engage with media."

== Contributors ==
The ExploreMusic team currently consists of:

- Alan Cross (Host of ExploreMusic and Ongoing History of New Music, curator, and interviewer)
- Mike Sullivan (Producer and interviewer)
- Adam Morrison (Writer, researcher, and blogger)
- Kelly Beveridge (Contributor)
- Andrew Dick (Video Producer)
- Jeff Woods (Host of Legends of Classic Rock)
- David Huszar (Executive Producer)
- Ira Haberman (Creative Director)
- Peter Solala (Director of Sales)
- Michael Parrish (US Syndication)
- Andrew Dick (Video Producer)
