= CJSS =

CJSS may stand for:

- CJSS-TV, a defunct television station in Cornwall, Ontario, Canada
- CJSS-FM, a radio station in Cornwall, Ontario, Canada
- CJSS, an American heavy metal band
- Canberra Japanese Supplementary School
