= List of assets owned by Shaw Communications =

This is a list of assets owned by Shaw Communications.

Approximately 80% of the voting control in Shaw Communications was held by the family of founder JR Shaw. This has been sold to Rogers Communications. The same family also owns about 80% of the voting rights in Corus Entertainment, and hence also exercises control over the media holdings of the Shaw family, in addition to the properties listed here.

== Specialty and community channels ==
- Cable Public Affairs Channel (23.68%)
- Shaw Multicultural Channel
- Shaw Spotlight

== Other assets ==
- BlueCurve TV App
- Shaw PPV
- Shaw Rocket Fund — organization providing funding for youth-oriented television series.
- Shaw Tracking:: — fleet management

== Former assets ==
- Shaw Cable — Cable television operator serving most of British Columbia (except the Sunshine Coast Regional District), Alberta (except Grande Prairie), and Manitoba (except Brandon and Winkler), as well as portions of Saskatchewan (Saskatoon area) and Ontario (Thunder Bay, Sault Ste. Marie, and Kenora).
- Shaw Broadcast Services — television and radio signal distributor
- Shaw Business Solutions
- Shaw Direct — national direct-broadcast satellite television provider
- Freedom Mobile — mobile network operator serving urban areas of British Columbia, Alberta, and Ontario
  - Shaw Mobile — mobile virtual network operator serving Alberta and British Columbia
- Shomi — video streaming service co-owned with Rogers Communications, shut down in 2016.
- CJBN-TV (Kenora, Ontario) — Global TV affiliate operated by Shaw Cable, shut down in 2017.
- ViaWest, Inc. — cloud computing and storage services, data management services, and network security services.

== See also ==
- List of assets owned by Corus Entertainment
