= CIQB-FM =

Radio station in Barrie, Ontario

Coordinates: 44°21′05″N 79°41′54″W

- Barrie, Ontario; Canada
- Broadcast area: Simcoe County
- Frequency: 101.1 MHz
- Branding: Big 101

Programming
- Format: Classic hits

Ownership
- Owner: Corus Radio (Corus Entertainment); (591589 B.C. Ltd.)
- Sister stations: CHAY-FM

History
- First air date: August 1, 1949
- Former call signs: CKBB (1949–1994)
- Former frequencies: 1230 kHz (1949–1958); 950 kHz (1958–1994)

Technical information
- Class: B
- ERP: 4,300 watts average 7,500 watts peak
- HAAT: 303.5 metres (996 ft)

Links
- Website: 1011bigfm.com

CIQB-FM (101.1 MHz) is a commercial radio station in Barrie, Ontario. The station uses the on-air brand name Big 101 and is owned by Corus Entertainment, which also owns sister station CHAY-FM. CIQB broadcasts a classic hits format, switching to Christmas music for much of November and December.

== History ==
On August 1, 1949, the station first signed on as CKBB. It was launched by Ralph Snelgrove's Barrie Broadcasting Company at AM 1230. It was Barrie's first radio station, and was initially a mixture of music and talk programming. It moved to 950 AM in 1958. In December 1983, the station was acquired by Kawartha Broadcasting, and in 1987, ownership passed to the broadcasting arm of Power Corporation of Canada.

In November 1994, after more than 45 years on the AM dial, CKBB moved to FM as CIQB-FM at 101.1 MHz. The station became known as B101, originally airing a hot adult contemporary format. CIQB was acquired by Corus Entertainment in April 2000. On October 15, 2000, the station shifted to adult contemporary, taking the format from sister station CHAY-FM, which flipped to top 40 as Energy Radio. The station reverted to hot AC in August 2003 (when CHAY returned to AC), and finally to top 40 in 2008. It was one of three top 40 stations owned by Corus radio along with CKQB-FM in Ottawa and CKBT-FM in Kitchener.

"B101" logo used until July 29, 2016

On April 1, 2016, Shaw Media was sold to Corus Entertainment. On July 27 of that year, CIQB's website was replaced with a countdown clock to July 29 at Noon, with CIQB itself running liners advising to listen at that specific time, claiming Barrie was about to get "bigger". At that time, after playing "Anybody Listening" by Classified, the station flipped to classic rock, branded as 101.1 Big FM. The first song on "Big" was "Big Time" by Peter Gabriel. The flip occurred in order to reduce the format overlap with sister station CHAY (which airs a Hot AC format). With the change, morning host Dave Blezard moved to afternoons at CHAY, while CIQB's new airstaff was announced on August 2.
