= John Badham (sportscaster) =

Canadian sportscaster and radio announcer (1937–2016)

- Born: April 1, 1937; Brock, Saskatchewan, Canada
- Died: December 8, 2016 (aged 79); Peterborough, Ontario, Canada
- Occupation(s): Sportscaster, radio announcer
- Years active: 1957–2016
- Known for: Canadian Football League
- Awards: Canadian Football Hall of Fame

John Badham (April 1, 1937 – December 8, 2016) was a Canadian sportscaster and radio announcer. He did play-by-play commentary for five Canadian Football League teams for 22 seasons and announced at 24 Grey Cups. He also covered the 1976 Summer Olympics and 1984 Winter Olympics for CBC Sports, and later worked for radio stations in Peterborough, Ontario from 1988 to 2016. He was inducted into the media section of the Canadian Football Hall of Fame in 1995.

== Early career in Saskatchewan ==
John Badham was born on April 1, 1937, in Brock, Saskatchewan, and was the son of an Anglican priest. His family moved around to several locations in Saskatchewan, then settled in Weyburn where he finished high school. He then worked at the Weyburn Mental Hospital and met his future wife, Dorothy Issac, who was a nurse. He and his wife had four children.

Badham began his sports career doing radio broadcasts for the Weyburn Beavers senior ice hockey team during the 1957–58 season. He then did play-by-play commentary for Saskatchewan Roughriders games in the Canadian Football League from 1959 to 1969, while working for CKCK-FM based in Regina, Saskatchewan.

== Middle career across Canada ==
Badham moved to Toronto in 1969, and did play-by-play for the Toronto Argonauts, including three tenures on three separate radio stations. He briefly returned to Saskatchewan to do play-by-play for the Regina Pats in the Western Hockey League for the 1974 Memorial Cup.

While working for CBC Sports, Badham covered the 1976 Summer Olympics in Montreal. For his commentary at the canoe and kayak events, neither he nor the director knew anything about the sport and relied on fellow commentator Marjorie Homer-Dixon who represented Canada in kayak events at the Summer Olympic Games in 1968 and 1972.

Badham became the play-by-play announcer for the Hamilton Tiger-Cats on CJJD-AM in 1978. He later moved to Vancouver to be the play-by-play announcer on CFUN for the BC Lions until the 1983 season.

Badham covered the 1984 Winter Olympics in Sarajevo for CBC Sports. He was in attendance when Gaétan Boucher won two gold medals and a bronze for Canada in speed skating at the 1984 Winter Olympics. Badham also recalled that in Sarajevo, "the airport was jam-packed with planes coming from all over and the military with guns were everywhere".

Badham became the voice of the Ottawa Rough Riders to replace Ernie Calcutt who died, and worked as the sports director at CFRA 580 AM in Ottawa. His play-by-play career ended in 1988, after he had called Canadian Football League games for 22 seasons for five different teams.

Badham's other work included play-by-play for at least 24 Grey Cups, the Canadian College Bowl and as a regular presenter of the Schenley Award ceremonies for the league's most value player. He also covered the Commonwealth Games, a Super Bowl, and Canadian and World Curling Championships.

== Later career in Peterborough ==
Badham departed Ottawa for Peterborough after he was hired at CHEX-TV in 1988, by Wally Macht who knew him when they were competing radio news anchors in Saskatchewan during the 1960s. CHEX operated both Kruz 100.5 and The Wolf 101.5, for which Badham appeared on air until he retired from full-time work in 2011. He and his partner Mike Melnik worked together on the Kruz for more than 5,000 morning shows over a span of 20 years. Badham also briefly served as the public address announcer for Peterborough Petes home games, but resigned after a few games to remain as a journalist for the team.

Badham returned to radio part-time in 2013 as host of the show The Regulars on Extra 90.5 until early in 2016, then hosted a noon-hour current events show until July 2016. He died on December 8, 2016, at the Peterborough Regional Health Centre due to liver cancer.

== Honours and legacy ==
The Regina Leader-Post noted that Badham had a reputation for "energetic play-by-play" commentary of the Canadian Football League, and "became known for his colourful and sometimes controversial news reports and interviews". He was inducted into the media section of the Canadian Football Hall of Fame in 1995. He was recognized with a career achievement award from Sports Media Canada in November 2016, accepted on his behalf by his sons while he was in hospital watching via FaceTime.

The John Badham Bursary was posthumously established at Trent University, given annually to a student in journalism, with funding by donations and the annual John Badham Memorial Golf Tournament.
