= CIAM =

CIAM may refer to:

- Central Institute of Aviation Motors, a specialized Russian research and engineering facility
- CIAM-FM, is a radio station in Fort Vermilion, Alberta, Canada
- CIAM, former call sign of CJDV-FM, a radio station in Cambridge, Ontario, Canada
- Congrès Internationaux d'Architecture Moderne, the International Congresses of Modern Architecture
- Commission Internationale Aeromodelling, a section of Fédération Aéronautique Internationale
- Customer Identity Access Management, technical and policy systems to grant customers appropriate access
