= CJSS-TV =

Television station in Cornwall, Ontario (1959–1963)

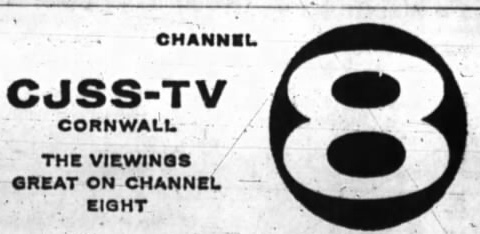

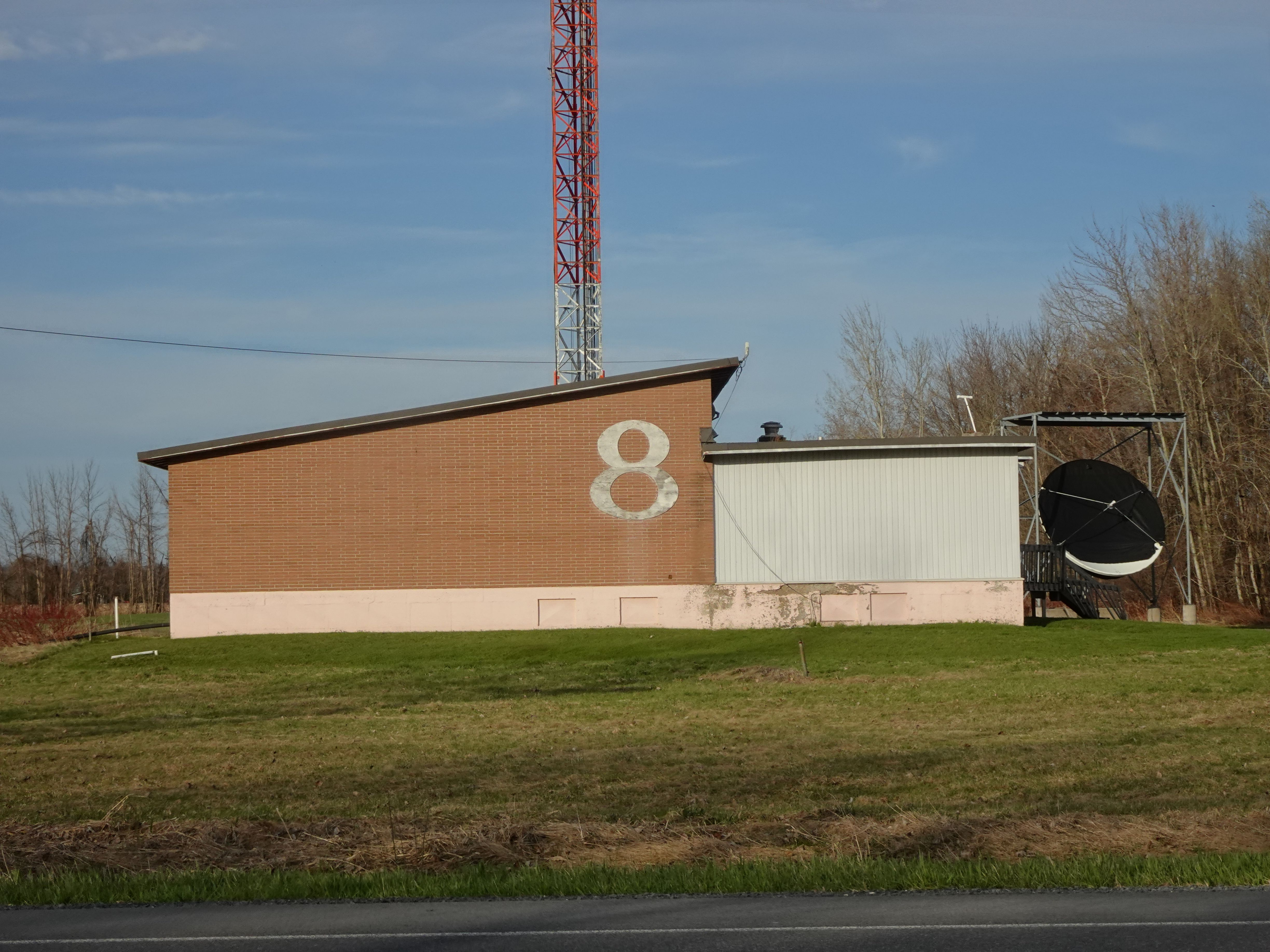
- Former CJOH/CJSS transmitter in Lancaster, Ontario, near the Quebec border.
- Cornwall, Ontario; Canada
- Channels: Analog: 8 (VHF)

Programming
- Affiliations: CBC

Ownership
- Owner: Stanley Shenkman

History
- First air date: October 18, 1959
- Last air date: November 3, 1962
- Call sign meaning: Stanley Shenkman

CJSS-TV (channel 8) was a television station in Cornwall, Ontario, Canada. In operation from 1959 to 1963 as a private affiliate of CBC Television, the station was later converted to a rebroadcaster of Ottawa's CJOH-TV.

The station originally signed on test broadcasts on October 12, 1959, and began regular programming as a CBC Television affiliate on October 18, owned by Toronto architect Stanley Shenkman. Shenkman also acquired the radio stations CKSF and CKSF-FM, which both adopted the CJSS call sign as well.

In June 1961, CJSS-TV announced that it would disaffiliate with the CBC, and become an affiliate of a new television network, CTV.

Due to financial losses, CJSS was acquired by Ernie Bushnell in 1962. The station ceased local programming on November 3 and converted into a rebroadcaster of Ottawa's CTV affiliate CJOH the next day, making CJSS the first TV station in Canada ever to cease operations as its own station and become a repeater for another. After many years of use to rimshot the Montreal market, Bell Media took the station permanently dark in 2017. The radio stations were sold to the Emard family (Tri-Co Broadcasting Ltd.), and subsequently broadcast as part of Corus Entertainment. Of these stations, 1220 AM (as CJUL) left the air August 18, 2010, leaving just CJSS-FM retaining the original call sign.

== Notable personalities ==
- Don McGowan – talk show host (1959–1962)
