= Ralph Snelgrove =

Canadian businessman (1914–1990)

Ralph Trapnell Snelgrove (June 11, 1914 – March 27, 1990) was a Canadian radio and television pioneer who obtained one of the first television licences issued in Canada and built television station CKVR-TV in Barrie, Ontario.

Born in Newfoundland, Snelgrove was employed by Metropolitan Broadcasting in Toronto before becoming manager of AM radio station CFOS in Owen Sound, Ontario in 1940. He moved to Barrie to set up the town's first radio station CKBB, which launched on August 31, 1949. Six years later, Snelgrove launched CKVR-TV with call letters representing his wife's name and his own (Valerie and Ralph). In 1965, he founded Collingwood, Ontario's first radio station, CKCB (AM). Snelgrove sold his television stations to Allan Waters in 1969 and became a director of Waters' company, CHUM Limited. He sold his radio stations to Kawartha Broadcasting in 1983.

Snelgrove was the first president of the Central Canada Broadcasters Association and served as president of the Canadian Association of Broadcasters in 1948. In politics, he served as an alderman in Barrie and was also a school trustee. As well, Snelgrove was president of the Greater Barrie Chamber of Commerce.

He received an honorary Doctor of Laws from Wilfrid Laurier University in Waterloo, Ontario in 1981 and was inducted into the CAB Broadcast Hall of Fame in 1985. Snelgrove died in 1990 at age 75.

One of his sons is Timothy Snelgrove, founder of Timothy's World Coffee.
