= CING-FM =

Radio station in Hamilton, Ontario

Coordinates: 43.25896°N 79.90113°W

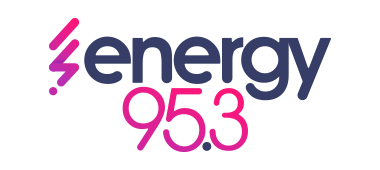
- Hamilton, Ontario; Canada
- Broadcast area: Greater Toronto and Hamilton Area; Waterloo Region; Niagara Region
- Frequency: 95.3 MHz (HD Radio)
- Branding: Energy 95.3

Programming
- Format: Hot adult contemporary
- Subchannels: HD2: CFIQ simulcast

Ownership
- Owner: Corus Entertainment; (Corus Premium Television Ltd.)
- Sister stations: CJXY-FM

History
- First air date: September 24, 1976
- Former frequencies: 107.9 MHz (1976–2001)
- Call sign meaning: derived from the word "sing"

Technical information
- Licensing authority: CRTC
- Class: C1
- ERP: 100,000 watts
- HAAT: 287 metres (942 ft)

Links
- Webcast: Listen live
- Website: energy953radio.ca

CING-FM (95.3 MHz Energy 95.3) is a Canadian radio station in Hamilton, Ontario. The station airs a hot adult contemporary format. CING's studios are located on Main Street West in Hamilton, while its transmitter is located near Hwy 5 and Millgrove Side Rd in Flamborough. CING is owned by Corus Entertainment.

CING was launched in 1976 by Burlington Broadcasting, at 107.9 FM in Burlington. Initially an easy listening and then an oldies station, the station switched to a dance format in the summer of 1991, which garnered a huge audience, after several months of adding new-age music to its mixture of classical and MOR music. The station applied to the Canadian Radio-television and Telecommunications Commission (CRTC) a number of times in the 1980s for frequency changes in the hopes of better reaching the more lucrative Toronto market, but was denied each time.

== History ==
=== FM 108 era (1976–1997) ===
CING began on September 24, 1976, as a beautiful music format featuring mostly instrumental versions of pop favorites. The first song heard on the 107.9 FM frequency was "Sing" by The Carpenters. The station began experimenting with playing oldies during the overnight period in 1978; the response was positive, and by 1980 oldies shows constituted the majority of the program schedule. During the 1980s, FM 108 divided its programming between oldies and MOR music, and was known for its personable oldies announcers, including Glen Darling, Norman B., Steve Richards/Mortenson, Wes Atkinson, Burt Thombs, Clint Trueman, Mark Eustace, Jay Brown, Dale Patterson (webmaster for Rock Radio Scrapbook), the Shadow, Dave Terryberry, Larry Smith, and the infamous Rockin Robin.

CING began to phase out its oldies programming in the fall of 1989 with the addition of dance programming ("Rhythm Radio") in evenings and overnights; the station continued with its Soft AC/MOR format during the rest of the day on weekdays, as "Daytime Lite and Rhythm at Nite." Oldies programming was relegated to Saturdays. The last oldies show on FM 108, hosted by Dale Patterson, aired on September 29, 1990. "Daytime Lite" ended on September 2, 1991, and the dance format expanded full-time (first as Dance 108, and then to Energy 108 in the mid-1990s).

=== Energy 108 era (1997–2001) ===
In 1997, the station was acquired by Shaw Communications. Following the change in ownership, Energy's format shifted from dance music to mainstream CHR. dance, hip-hop/rap, rock, and pop all received equal airplay. A minor name change also took place, with Energy 108 changing to Energy Radio. Under Shaw's ownership, several other stations in Ontario, including CKDK-FM in Woodstock/London, CHAY-FM in Barrie and CKGE-FM in Oshawa/Toronto, also adopted the "Energy" format, rebroadcasting CING much of the day. Shaw's radio operations were, in turn, spun off to Corus Entertainment in 1999.

=== Frequency switch; subsequent format changes (2001–present) ===
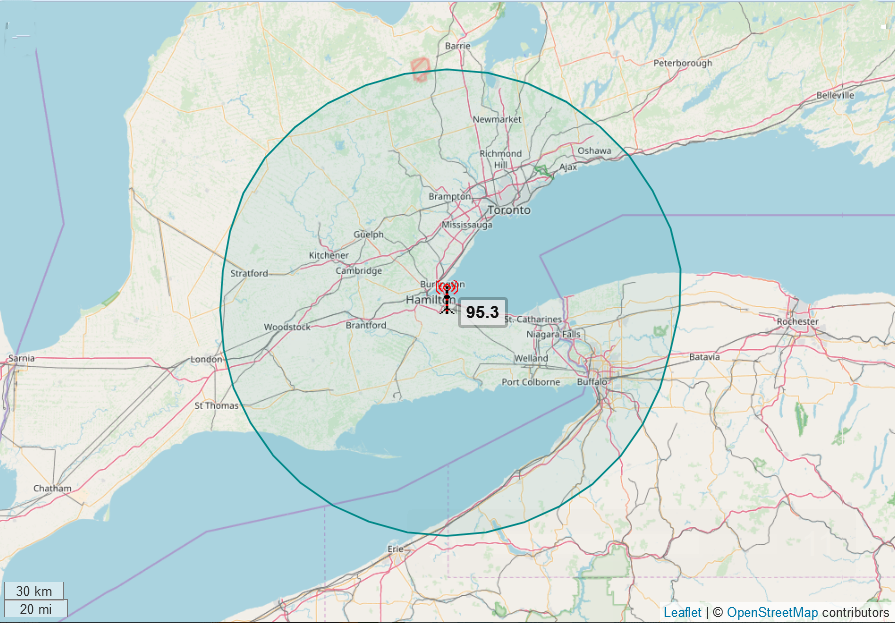
Broadcast area map for CING as of 2017.

On August 31, 2001, CING and CJXY-FM swapped frequencies. CING moved to its current 95.3 frequency, and CJXY took over 107.9. The frequency switch brought with it a change in the network's sound, with the mainstream CHR/Top 40 format making way for a hot adult contemporary format. With CING now available over a wider geographic area, the other stations dropped their CING simulcasts in 2002. The new format mirrored the format of Toronto's market leader CHUM-FM, which resulted in very low ratings.

On August 9, 2002, at 6 p.m., the station dropped its troubled Hot AC format (and the "Energy" moniker), and began stunting with stand-up comedy bits. The final songs on "Energy" were "Rhythm Is a Dancer" by Snap!, Last Dance by Donna Summer and "Happy Trails" by Roy Rogers. On August 19, 2002, at 7 a.m., the station flipped to country, branded as Country 95.3. The first song on "Country" was "Small Town Saturday Night" by Hal Ketchum.

On November 13, 2009, at 3 p.m., CING switched formats to classic hits, branded as Vinyl 95.3. The final song on "Country" was "The Dance" by Garth Brooks, while the first song on "Vinyl" was "Start Me Up" by The Rolling Stones. The station's playlist featured the greatest hits of the 1960s, 70s and 80s, and was considered to be the first oldies/classic hits station in the Greater Toronto Area on FM after the CRTC permitted the oldies format to be heard full-time on FM for the first time. Locally, the station competed against AM station CKOC; after Christmas of that year, the station also competed against adult hits station CHBM-FM in Toronto, which lost their oldies outlet on CHUM, which flipped to a simulcast of CP24 in March of that year.

In its latter months, the station broadened their playlist to include 90s and current tracks. With this change, however, the station's ratings began to slide.

Fresh FM logo (2013–2015)

On April 10, 2013, at 9:53 a.m., the station changed its format back to Hot AC, now branded as 95.3 Fresh FM. The station became the fourth radio station owned by Corus to adopt the "Fresh" branding. While most of the previous format's airstaff (including Toronto market veterans Gord James, John Novak and Bob Saint) were let go, Darrin Laidman and Colleen Rusholme remain in mornings with their producer Mike moving to evenings after a brief jockless period. The final song as "Vinyl" was Landslide by Fleetwood Mac while the first song as "Fresh" was Get the Party Started by Pink!.

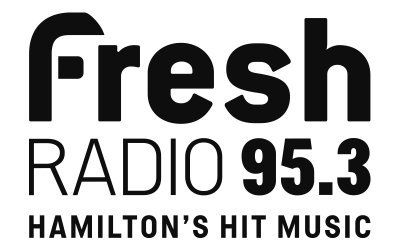
Fresh Radio logo (2015–2019)

On February 13, 2015, CING rebranded to 95.3 Fresh Radio, in conjunction with Corus rebranding all of their "Fresh FM" stations to the new branding on the same date and time.

On March 26, 2019, at 8 a.m., CING rebranded as Energy 95.3. The last song on "Fresh" was "Good Feeling" by Flo Rida, while the first song on the revived "Energy" was "High Hopes" by Panic! At the Disco. The change brought with it a new morning show, Tucker and Maura, formerly of CKFM-FM in Toronto. Former morning hosts Rusholme moved to afternoon drive, while Laidman decided to leave the company. Later that year, Rusholme departed for Ottawa sister station CJOT-FM, and was replaced with the syndicated "Brooke & Jubal in the Morning", based out of KQMV in Seattle. CING was the second station in Canada to air Brooke & Jubal following Ottawa sister station CKQB-FM, and the first to air it in afternoons. (The show would later be dropped, and replaced with Jeunesse.)

CING competes with local stations CJED-FM and CHRE-FM, as well as neighboring stations CHUM-FM and CHFI-FM (from Toronto) and CHYM-FM (from Kitchener).

On September 13, 2023, the CRTC approved an application by Corus to relocate CING-FM's transmission site from Stoney Creek to a new tower in the Flamborough district of Hamilton, off Highway 5, between Millgrove Side Road and Mazza Avenue. Antenna height was lowered from 305.0 to 287.0 metres (EHAAT). Power would remain at 100,000 watts (ERP) and the radiation pattern would remain non-directional. CING-FM remains at 95.3 FM.

== HD Radio ==
In 2012, CING signed on HD Radio operations. Initially, their HD2 subchannel was testing mostly with traffic and weather reports, as well as gas price reports. CING is the first Canadian radio station to utilize the technology. Multicultural station CJSA-FM in nearby Toronto signed on their HD technology in December 2013. On September 8, 2015, CING began simulcasting sister CFMJ on 95.3-HD2. On February 4, 2016, CING added a simulcast of sister station CHML to their HD radio feed on 95.3-HD3. The simulcast ended when CHML ceased broadcasting on August 14, 2024.
