= CKCB-FM =

Radio station in Collingwood, Ontario

Coordinates: 44°28′42″N 80°19′36″W

- Collingwood, Ontario; Canada
- Frequency: 95.1 MHz
- Branding: The Peak 95.1 FM

Programming
- Format: Adult contemporary

Ownership
- Owner: Corus Entertainment; (Corus Premium Television Ltd.)
- Sister stations: CHAY-FM, CIQB-FM

History
- First air date: 1965
- Former frequencies: 1400 kHz (1965–1994)

Technical information
- Class: A
- ERP: 350 watts
- HAAT: 288.5 metres (947 ft)

Links
- Website: thepeakfm.com

CKCB-FM is a Canadian radio station broadcasting at 95.1 MHz in Collingwood, Ontario, with an adult contemporary format branded on-air as 95.1 The Peak FM.

The station began broadcasting in 1965 on 1400 kHz, until it moved to its current frequency in 1994. The station went through different ownerships over the years and in 2000 was acquired by Corus Entertainment.

The original on-air personality, who signed on CKCB at a community reception held at the Collingwood Shriner's Hall on the evening of Tuesday October 12, 1965 was Jim Craig, who went on to enjoy a successful Radio and TV career in SW Ontario and Western Canada prior to moving into teaching. He went on to become a Professor of Broadcast Studies with the faculty of the Seneca College School of Media at York University in Toronto, a position he held until his passing in 2023.

Rosemarie Hergott-Henderson and Bob Robinson (Sales) rounded out the sign-on staff of CKCB, and Bill Bramah joined as an announcer after 6 months, and later became well known as host of Global TV's "Bill Bramah's Ontario" and as an historical author.

Longtime broadcaster and former morning man John Nichols started at CKCB in 1971. John has received countless awards for his years of service to the Southern Georgian Bay area and he's active with many community organizations. He retired in December 2012.

CKCB General Manager from 1998 to 2012, John Eaton, took over the morning show duties and continues to host "Talk of the Town" with Melanie Case.

== Notes ==
On December 13, 1984, the CRTC approved a number of applications for a number of AM radio stations across Ontario including CKCB Collingwood to increase their nighttime power from 250 watts to 1,000 watts.
