= CKDO =

Radio station in Oshawa, Ontario

Coordinates: 43°52′19″N 78°45′53″W

- Oshawa, Ontario; Canada
- Broadcast area: Greater Toronto Area
- Frequency: 1580 kHz
- Branding: 107.7 FM & 1580 AM CKDO

Programming
- Format: Classic hits–oldies

Ownership
- Owner: Durham Radio Inc.

History
- First air date: October 5, 1946
- Former frequencies: 1240 kHz (1946–1956); 1350 kHz (1956–2006)
- Call sign meaning: "Durham Ontario County" (broadcast area)

Technical information
- Licensing authority: CRTC
- Class: A (both AM and FM)
- Power: 10,000 watts (AM)
- ERP: 580 watts - 2,000 watts (maximum) (FM)
- HAAT: 86 metres (282 ft) (FM)
- Translator: CKDO-FM-1 107.7 Durham
- Repeater: 95.9 CJKX-FM-HD3 Oshawa

Links
- Website: www.ckdo.ca

CKDO (1580 kHz) is a commercial AM radio station in Oshawa, Ontario, Canada, serving the eastern suburbs of the Greater Toronto Area. The station airs a classic hits–oldies format and is owned by Durham Radio Inc. CKDO is one of only two radio stations in Canada that broadcast on 1580 kHz. The other is CBPK, a 50-watt weather information station in Revelstoke, British Columbia.

CKDO is powered at 10,000 watts, using a directional antenna with a two-tower array. It is a clear channel, Class A station. The transmitter is on Courtice Road in Clarington. Programming is also heard on FM rebroadcaster CKDO-FM-1 at 107.7 MHz and on 95.9 CJKX-FM-HD3.

== History ==
On October 5, 1946; 80 years ago, CKDO first signed on. It was launched by T. W. Elliott, an executive with the Canadian division of General Motors. Its original frequency was 1240 kilocycles.

Former logo

In 1950, Elliott sold the station to Lakeland Broadcasting, which changed the call sign to CKLB. The station moved to AM 1350 in 1956. The following year, Lakeland launched an FM sister station, CKLB-FM. In 1979, the stations were acquired by Grant Broadcasting, and CKLB adopted the new call sign CKAR. (The former CKAR call sign is now used at a radio station in Huntsville).

In 1990, Grant Broadcasting sold the stations to Power Broadcasting. In 1992, Power readopted the station's original CKDO call sign and an oldies format. In 1996, the station moved to an adult contemporary music format, sometimes simulcasting the programming of its FM sister station and other times airing its own distinct programming schedule.

In 2000, Corus Entertainment acquired the stations. In February 2001, Corus tried adding CKDO to its short-lived talk radio network (also consisting of CHML in Hamilton, CFPL in London, CKRU in Peterborough, CFFX in Kingston and CJOY in Guelph), but the station returned to the oldies format by the summer of that year.

In 2003, CKDO and CKGE were acquired by their current owner, Durham Radio Inc.

Durham established an FM rebroadcaster in 2005. The station had originally been approved by the CRTC in 2004, conditional on choosing a frequency other than 107.7, for which the station had originally applied.

On August 13, 2006, CKDO moved from 1350 to 1580 kHz, taking over a Class A, clear-channel frequency and inheriting its protections against interference. The 1580 frequency had originally been the home of CBJ in Chicoutimi, Quebec, before that Ici Radio-Canada station migrated to the FM dial. CKDO operates at the minimum power required to broadcast on a clear-channel frequency, 10,000 watts.

The CKDO call sign was previously used by an unrelated station in Baie-Comeau, Quebec, which operated at 92.5 FM from 1988 to 1991.
