= CIMJ-FM =

Radio station in Guelph, Ontario, Canada

Coordinates: 43°29′09″N 80°14′42″W

- Guelph, Ontario; Canada
- Broadcast area: Waterloo Region
- Frequency: 106.1 MHz
- Branding: Magic 106

Programming
- Format: Hot adult contemporary

Ownership
- Owner: Corus Entertainment; (591589 B.C. Ltd.)
- Sister stations: CJOY

History
- First air date: July 1, 1969
- Former call signs: CJOY-FM (1969–1975); CKLA-FM (1975–1992)
- Call sign meaning: "Magic" (branding)

Technical information
- Licensing authority: CRTC
- Class: B
- ERP: 50,000 watts
- HAAT: 120.5 metres (395 ft)

Links
- Website: magic106.com

CIMJ-FM (106.1 MHz, Magic 106), is a Canadian hot adult contemporary radio station based in Guelph, Ontario, in the Kitchener-Waterloo market. Its sister station is CJOY. Their studios are located at 75 Speedvale Ave East and its transmitter is located in Puslinch, between the Waterloo Region and Guelph.

== History ==
- 16 May 1968: CRTC approves an application by CJOY Ltd. to operate a new FM station in Guelph. The initial studio and office address is 50 Wyndham Street.
- 1 July 1969: CJOY-FM begins its first broadcasts. It is authorised for 106.1 MHz frequency, 50 000 watts effective radiated power and 75.9 metres (249 ft) antenna height.
- 26 July 1972: CJOY-FM and its associated AM station (CJOY) are authorised to relocate their common offices and studios to 75 Speedvale Avenue East and have remained there since.
- 1975: CJOY-FM calls sign changes to CKLA-FM.
- 1977: CJOY Ltd. assumes at least partial ownership of AM station CFTJ in Cambridge.
- 1980: CRTC approves relocation of both the CJOY AM and FM transmitters.
- 28 April 1987: Kawartha Broadcasting Co. Ltd. purchases CJOY Ltd. (CKLA-FM and CJOY), including the associated Galt Broadcasting company which operates the Cambridge station formerly known as CFTJ (whose call sign became CIAM in 1987).
- 1989: CKLA-FM's owners now known as Power Broadcasting.
- 10 July 1992: The station's call letters are now CIMJ-FM, but begins to identify itself as Magic 106.1. The station format changes from easy listening to adult contemporary, featuring music from the 1970s to the 1990s.
- 29 August 1996: CRTC renews CIMJ-FM licence until 2003
- 2 June 1995: Station co-founder Wally Slatter dies.
- February 1996: Station co-founder Fred Metcalf dies.
- 24 March 2000: CRTC approves sale of Power Broadcasting radio stations to Corus Radio, including CJOY-AM and CIMJ-FM
- 13 April 2000: Corus purchase of Power Broadcasting radio properties is completed.
- July 2003: The station shifted to its present hot adult contemporary format after CIZN dropped its format and changed frequencies.
- September 2007: Major studio renovations begin.
- August 2008: Studios are completed and are on an AES 44.1 digital network. Digital audio is stored and played back uncompressed.
