= CJXY-FM =

Radio station in Hamilton, Ontario

Coordinates: 43°23′12″N 79°52′33″W

- Burlington, Ontario; Canada
- Broadcast area: Greater Toronto and Hamilton Area; Waterloo Region; Niagara Region
- Frequency: 107.9 MHz
- Branding: Y108

Programming
- Format: Active rock
- Affiliations: Hamilton Tiger-Cats

Ownership
- Owner: Corus Radio (Corus Entertainment)
- Sister stations: CING-FM

History
- First air date: 1948
- Former call signs: CHML-FM (1948–1967); CKDS-FM (1967–1991)
- Former frequencies: 94.1 MHz (1948–1960s); 95.3 MHz (1964–2001)

Technical information
- Licensing authority: CRTC
- Class: B
- ERP: 26,100 watts
- HAAT: 205 metres (673 ft)

Links
- Webcast: Listen live
- Website: y108.ca

CJXY-FM (107.9 MHz) is a Canadian radio station serving the Hamilton, Ontario market, licensed to the suburb of Burlington. The station broadcasts an alternative-leaning active rock format as Y108. CJXY's studios are located on Main Street West (next to Highway 403) in Hamilton, while its transmitter is located atop the Niagara Escarpment near Cedar Springs Road and Number 1 Side Road in Burlington.

== History ==
The station was originally launched in 1948 as 94.1 CHML-FM, a simulcast of AM station CHML. The simulcast was subsequently dropped in the 1950s, leaving the station silent. The owners relaunched the FM signal on 95.3 in 1964, with distinct programming from its AM sister station. In 1967, the station adopted the new callsign CKDS-FM, in honour of company founder Kenneth D. Soble, who had died in 1966.

In 1974, CHML and CKDS-FM were purchased by ML Radio, a division of what was to become Western International Communications. On September 1, 1991, CKDS-FM dropped its long-time adult contemporary/easy listening format, and adopted the CJXY callsign and a classic rock format as Y95.

In 2000, CHML and CJXY were acquired by Corus Entertainment. On August 31, 2001, CJXY swapped frequencies with Corus' CING-FM, taking over CING's former 107.9 frequency; at the same time, it changed its moniker to the current Y108.

Former logo
