= CHEX-DT-2 =

Television station in Oshawa

- Oshawa, Ontario; Canada
- Channels: Digital: 29 (UHF); Virtual: 22
- Branding: Global Durham

Programming
- Affiliations: 22.1: Global

Ownership
- Owner: Corus Entertainment; (591987 B.C. Ltd.)
- Sister stations: CIII-DT, CHEX-DT, CKWS-DT

History
- First air date: 1992 (as transmitter of CHEX-TV); 2004 (as separate station)
- Former call signs: CHEX-TV-2 (1992–2019)
- Former channel number: Analog: 22 (UHF, 1992–2019)
- Former affiliations: CBC Television (1992–2015); CTV (2015–2018)
- Call sign meaning: derived from former parent station, CHEX-DT

Technical information
- Licensing authority: CRTC
- ERP: 0.185 kW
- HAAT: 133.5 m (438 ft)
- Transmitter coordinates: 43°57′15″N 78°48′23″W

Links
- Website: Global Durham

CHEX-DT-2 (channel 22) is a television station licensed to Oshawa, Ontario, Canada, serving the Regional Municipality of Durham. It is owned and operated by the Global Television Network, a division of Corus Entertainment, and maintains studios on Simcoe Street (just north of King Street) in Downtown Oshawa and a transmitter on Enfield Road in Clarington.

CHEX-TV-2 was originally a CBC Television affiliate until August 31, 2015, when it became an affiliate of CTV. On August 14, 2018, it was announced that CHEX-TV-2's affiliation agreement with CTV would expire on August 27; the station subsequently became a Global owned-and-operated station known as Global Durham as of September 6.

Although operating as a separate station from Peterborough sister station CHEX-DT, it retains the CHEX-DT-2 callsign used when the station operated as a rebroadcaster of CHEX.

== History ==
CHEX-2's former logo used until February 2004.

Oshawa, although larger in population than Peterborough, had not been granted a television station in the original channel assignments issued during the 1950s. Instead, the city was folded into the Toronto market. CHEX-TV-2 signed on the air in 1992, when CBC Television affiliate CHEX-TV in Peterborough began relaying its programming on a new rebroadcast transmitter in Oshawa; prior to 1988, the UHF channel 22 allocation had been used by CIII-TV's Toronto-area transmitter (and de facto flagship transmitter) in Uxbridge.

In 1993, the Oshawa transmitter became a semi-satellite with some slight differences in local programming. In 2004, the station relaunched as a full-fledged station with a very different schedule; for instance, the station produced a separate local newscast, Studio 12 News and current affairs program In Depth with Dan Carter, that was produced independently from CHEX and focused on Durham Region. The station remained affiliated with CBC despite the fact its signal overlaps with that of the network's Toronto owned-and-operated station (O&O) CBLT-DT; as a result, the Toronto market was served by two CBC stations (the first since 1961, when CHCH-TV became an independent station).

Former logo used until October 2016.

On May 20, 2015, Corus and Bell Media announced an agreement whereby Corus' CBC affiliates, including CHEX-TV-2, would leave the public network and instead affiliate with CTV. The affiliation switch took effect on August 31, 2015. Due to the overlapping coverage discussed above, most TV service providers serving the region already carry CBLT, and any that did not would have to add a CBC affiliate such as CBLT to their basic services in order to comply with Canadian Radio-television and Telecommunications Commission (CRTC) regulations. CTV already served the CHEX-TV-2 viewing area through its Toronto O&O CFTO-DT; in consequence, the Toronto market was then served by two CTV outlets in most parts of the market (CFTO plus either CHEX-TV-2 or CKCO-DT in Kitchener). However, CHEX-TV-2 provided exclusive terrestrial coverage of CTV programming in most of the Durham Region and Toronto's east side, as CFTO's digital signal on VHF channel 9 is nulled to the east.

The switch was approved by the CRTC on August 27, 2015, when it dismissed objections by Rogers Media and by a resident who complained that as he only received television over the air, he would lose his ability to receive CBC Television as a result of the disaffiliation.

Legally, CHEX-TV-2's relationship with CTV was described as a "program supply agreement", and not as an "affiliation" (a term with specific legal implications under CRTC rules), as Corus maintained editorial control over the stations' programming and the ability to sell local advertising, and did not delegate responsibility for CTV programs aired by the station to Bell Media.

== Programming ==
During its period as a CTV affiliate, most of the CTV Television programs broadcast by CHEX-TV-2 included the network's daytime programming, as well as prime time and weekend programs—the rest of the station's schedule was filled with syndicated shows and local programming.

As with CHEX-TV in Peterborough, due to the station's overlapping coverage area with CBLT, CHEX-TV-2 was occasionally used during the early 2010s as an overflow for Hockey Night in Canada's coverage of the Stanley Cup Playoffs, airing alternate games that were also streamed via the CBC Sports website, providing an option for viewers in the Greater Toronto Area that wished to see the secondary game without resorting to Internet streaming. This practice ended following the 2014 Stanley Cup playoffs, as the CBC's rights are now sub-licensed from Rogers Media and any conflicting games are simply reassigned to other Sportsnet channels.

CHEX-DT-2's current local programs include Global Durham News, a series of newscasts that air weekdays at 5 p.m., 7 p.m. and 11:00 p.m. Also, CHEX-DT-2 simulcasts other newscasts from CHEX, as well as Global News at 5:30 and 6 from Global Toronto.

On September 6, 2016, CHEX-DT, CHEX-TV-2 and CKWS-DT in Kingston began airing Global National at 5:30 p.m., as well as simulcasting The Morning Show from CIII-DT in Toronto. The station was rebranded as Global Durham on October 31, 2016, although entertainment programming was still supplied from CTV until August 27, 2018. As a result, CHEX-TV-2 did not carry any of CTV's news shows during its time with the network, including the flagship newscast CTV National News and the national morning show Your Morning, as both shows can be seen on CFTO, as well as CTV News Channel, and on both the CTV and CTV News websites. Today, the station carries the entire Global schedule, with the only exception being the soap opera The Young and the Restless, which is being not carried by CHEX-TV-2 in favour of syndicated programming at 4:30 p.m., and a local newscast at 5 p.m., however, Durham Region viewers are still able to see the soap through CIII-DT in its normal time slot. The use of the Global news programming and name is despite the duplication from the coverage of CIII's Toronto signal; unlike CFTO, CIII's digital signal is omnidirectional, with a city grade signal as far east as Ajax and a Grade A signal as far east as Oshawa.

== Technical information ==
=== Subchannel ===
Subchannel of CHEX-DT-2
Subchannel	Res.	Short name	Programming
22.1	1080i	CHEX-HD	Global

=== Analog-to-digital conversion ===
Despite serving part of the Greater Toronto Area, as an Oshawa-licensed station, CHEX-TV-2 was not required to participate in the August 31, 2011 digital switch for major markets, and thus was the last remaining analog television signal still operating in the GTA. Bell Fibe TV subscribers in its primary coverage area have access to the station and its Global programming in high-definition on that provider.

According to Industry Canada, CHEX-TV-2 was required to switch to digital broadcasting on channel 29 between April 13 and June 21, 2019. The station has since converted to digital operations at 185 watts on UHF channel 29, giving nearly exact coverage compared to when it was in analog operations on UHF channel 22 at 5,500 watts.
