= CJUL =

Former radio station in Cornwall, Ontario

Coordinates: 45.021°N 74.730°W

- Cornwall, Ontario; Canada
- Frequency: 1220 kHz
- Branding: AM 1220

Programming
- Format: talk radio/oldies

Ownership
- Owner: Corus Entertainment
- Sister stations: CJSS-FM, CFLG-FM

History
- First air date: February 15, 1945
- Last air date: September 30, 2010; (65 years, 227 days)

Technical information
- Class: C
- Power: 1 kW

CJUL was an English-language Canadian radio station located in Cornwall, Ontario.

Owned and operated by Corus Entertainment, it broadcast on 1220 kHz with power of 1,000 watts as a class C station, using an omnidirectional antenna. The station was on the air from 1945 to 2010.

== History ==
The AM radio station in Cornwall originally signed on as CKSF at 1230 kHz on February 15, 1945, launched by the Cornwall Standard Freeholder. CKSF later moved to 1220 kHz in 1958. It was later converted to CJSS, which converted to the 101.9 FM on June 6, 1999. Subsequently, rather than go dark, the AM 1220 frequency became home to CJUL on November 24, 2000, which flipped to an adult standards format under the name "The Jewel".

On November 19, 2001, the CRTC approved the application by Corus Entertainment Inc. to purchase Tri-Co Broadcasting Ltd. (519957 Ontario Ltd.) from the Émard family. Tri-Co was owner of CJUL, CFLG-FM and CJSS-FM.

The station later changed to a combination talk radio/oldies format branded as AM1220, Today's News, Yesterday's Hits. Half of the station's weekday broadcast was featured talk programming including newsmagazines John Bolton's Cornwall Today and Cornwall@5. The nationally syndicated Adler On-Line with Charles Adler aired from 3pm to 5pm local time. The remainder of the day, the station played oldies from the 1960s and 1970s.

On August 18, 2010, Corus announced it was closing the station effective immediately, but simultaneously announced an increase to the frequency and duration of newscasts on sister stations CJSS-FM and CFLG-FM.

No specific reason for closing the station was given, although the station was the only AM station in the Cornwall market; it was also the third Corus-owned AM station to have closed down in 2010, following the closures of CINF and CINW in Montreal in January.

As a consequence to CJUL's closedown, St. Catharines' station CHSC could be heard after sunset. This availability was short-lived; although CHSC was to have left the air upon the expiration of its licence on August 31, 2010, it remained on the air after being issued a stay from the Federal Court of Canada until September 30, when its appeal was denied. On October 12, 2010, Corus received approval to revoke CJUL's licence.
