= CHAY-FM =

Radio station in Barrie, Ontario

Coordinates: 44.4361°N 79.7298°W

- Barrie, Ontario; Canada
- Broadcast area: Central Ontario, Golden Horseshoe
- Frequency: 93.1 MHz
- Branding: Fresh 93.1

Programming
- Format: Rhythmic-leaning contemporary hit radio

Ownership
- Owner: Corus Radio (Corus Entertainment)
- Sister stations: CIQB-FM

History
- First air date: May 21, 1977
- Call sign meaning: "Chay" is a Huron greeting loosely translated to "good day"

Technical information
- Class: C1
- ERP: 100 kW
- HAAT: 311 m (1,020 ft)

Links
- Webcast: Listen Live
- Website: 931freshradio.ca

CHAY-FM (93.1 MHz) is a commercial radio station licensed to Barrie, Ontario. CHAY is owned by Corus Entertainment, airing a Rhythmic-leaning contemporary hit radio format branded as Fresh 93.1.

Unlike other Barrie radio stations, which cannot be heard in the GTA due to lower power or interference, CHAY reliably covers the northern half of the GTA, and can be heard as far south as Hamilton, as far north as Huntsville, as far west as Owen Sound, and as far east as Peterborough.

== History ==
CHAY signed on the air originally with a hybrid easy listening/beautiful music format on May 21, 1977, but changed to more of an adult contemporary format the following decade with the decline of beautiful music on FM radio. The station was initially broadcast from a 1,000 foot tower just south of Barrie that it had shared with local television station CKVR-TV. On September 7 of that year, a small plane crashed into the tower, destroying the building and killing everyone on board. Toronto station CHIN-FM assisted CHAY in temporarily restoring its signal until the tower was replaced one year later.

In 1989, CHAY moved to more of a mainstream adult contemporary format. Throughout the transition period, the station continued to attract an audience of a quarter million listeners per week.

On October 15, 2000, CHAY flipped to a rhythmic contemporary/CHR format as Energy 93.1, simulcasting some programming from its sister station CING-FM in Hamilton. In 2003, the station returned to its adult contemporary format as The New CHAY 93.1 FM. In 2008, the station was rebranded to FM93, Barrie's Fresh Music Mix, but kept the same AC format.

On March 11, 2011, the station flipped to an adult hits format as CHAY TODAY @ 93.1 FM; by summer 2014, the station moved back to an upbeat mainstream adult contemporary format.

On May 15, 2015, CHAY re-branded as 93.1 Fresh Radio with a hot AC format. CHAY became the eighth Corus radio station to adopt the "Fresh Radio" branding.

In 2019, the station was slightly re-branded to Fresh 93.1 with a Rhythmic-leaning contemporary hit radio format.
