= CHEX-DT =

Television station in Peterborough, Ontario

- Peterborough, Ontario; Canada
- Channels: Digital: 12 (VHF); Virtual: 12
- Branding: Global Peterborough; CHEX News on Global Peterborough

Programming
- Affiliations: 12.1: Global

Ownership
- Owner: Corus Entertainment; (591987 B.C. Ltd.)
- Sister stations: CHEX-DT-2, CKWS-DT, CIII-DT, CKRU-FM, CKWF-FM

History
- First air date: March 25, 1955
- Former call signs: CHEX-TV (1955–2013)
- Former channel numbers: Analog: 12 (VHF, 1955–2013)
- Former affiliations: CBC Television (1955–2015); CTV (2015–2018)
- Call sign meaning: The Peterborough Examiner (former owner, local newspaper)

Technical information
- Licensing authority: CRTC
- ERP: 20 kW
- HAAT: 316.5 m (1,038 ft)
- Transmitter coordinates: 44°19′42″N 78°17′58″W
- Translator(s): CHEX-TV-1 4 Bancroft

Links
- Website: Global Peterborough

CHEX-DT (channel 12) is a television station in Peterborough, Ontario, Canada, owned and operated by the Global Television Network, a division of Corus Entertainment. The station maintains studios on Monaghan Road (near Rose Avenue) in the southern portion of Peterborough, and its transmitter is located on Television Hill, just outside the city.

== History ==
The station signed on the air on March 26, 1955, as an independently owned affiliate of CBC Television; its inaugural broadcast was a National Hockey League game. CHEX was founded by a media partnership that already published The Peterborough Examiner newspaper and owned radio station CHEX (now CKRU). The partnership included politician Rupert Davies, who was also involved in a similar arrangement in Kingston that established CKWS-TV. The Davies family sold its media interests to Power Corporation of Canada in 1976. On April 13, 2000, the station was acquired by Canadian media conglomerate Corus Entertainment.

Previous logo used from 2013 to 2016. An earlier variant of the logo featured cyan and green bars instead of red.

On May 20, 2015, Corus and Bell Media announced an agreement whereby its three CBC stations would leave the public network (after 60 years in the case of CHEX) and "affiliate" with CTV. The affiliation switch took effect on August 31, 2015. Most TV service providers serving the region already carry CBLT, and any that did not would have to add a CBC affiliate such as CBLT to their basic services in order to comply with Canadian Radio-television and Telecommunications Commission (CRTC) regulations.

Former logo used from October 2016 to August 2018

Legally, CHEX's relationship with CTV was described as a "program supply agreement", and not as an "affiliation" (a term with specific legal implications under CRTC rules), as Corus maintained editorial control over the stations' programming and the ability to sell local advertising, and did not delegate responsibility for CTV programs aired by the station to Bell Media. The switch was approved by the CRTC on August 27, 2015, dismissing objections by Rogers Media (who argued that the change was an "affiliation" and thus required CRTC consent to implement, and was not in the public interest because it created duplicate sources of CTV programming), and by a resident who complained that because he only received television over the air, he would lose his ability to receive CBC Television as a result of the disaffiliation.

Following the expiration of CHEX's three-year deal with CTV, the station became a Global owned-and-operated station (O&O) and rebranded itself as Global Peterborough on August 27, 2018; the CHEX branding was retained for the station's newscasts.

== News operation ==
Local newscasts, branded as CHEX News, air weekdays from 6 to 9 a.m. and at noon, and nightly at 6 and 11 p.m.

In September 2016, CHEX began to replace CTV News programming with Global News programs, moving its late-night newscast to 11 p.m. to replace the CTV National News (the vacant timeslot at 11:30 p.m. was replaced with ET Canada), and adding an airing of Global National. On October 24, 2016, CHEX premiered a local morning newscast known as The Morning Show, which was patterned after the program of the same name aired by CIII-DT and the Global News Morning format used in other markets.

== Technical information ==
=== Subchannels ===
Subchannels of CHEX-DT
Subchannel	Res.	Short name	Programming
12.1	1080i	CHEXHD	Global
30.1	1080i	CKWSHD	Global Kingston (CKWS-DT)

Simulcast of subchannels of another station

=== Analog-to-digital conversion ===
CHEX-TV began offering a high definition feed on Cogeco Cable in the Peterborough area in November 2010. The station switched its over-the-air signal from analog to digital on May 9, 2013.

The CRTC has not listed Peterborough as one of its mandatory markets for analog television shutdown and digital conversion, and as a result CHEX-TV was not required to convert to digital transmissions on the transition date of August 31, 2011.

=== Transmitters ===
In 1965, CHEX-TV was authorized to add a rebroadcast transmitter at Bancroft, Ontario on channel 2 as CHEX-TV-1, but it moved to channel 4 in 1973 to make room for a new Global transmitter (CIII-TV-2). In the late 1960s to early 1970s, a new rebroadcast transmitter was added in Minden to operate on channel 10 as CHEX-TV-2, later changed to channel 7. The Minden rebroadcaster was deleted during the 1980s. In 1992, a new rebroadcast transmitter was added to serve Oshawa and areas on channel 22, as CHEX-TV-2.
