= Fresh Radio (Canada) =

Canadian radio brand

- Type: Radio network
- Country: Canada

Programming
- Format: Hot adult contemporary

Ownership
- Owner: Corus Radio (Corus Entertainment)

History
- Former names: Fresh FM (2013–2015)

Coverage
- Availability: FM: Selected areas of Ontario

Links
- Website: www.freshradio.ca

Fresh Radio (formerly Fresh FM) is a branding of hot adult contemporary radio stations broadcasting in Ontario, Canada, owned by Corus Entertainment.

The network was rebranded to Fresh Radio in February 2015 and was expanded to include two stations in Kingston and Peterborough.

== Stations ==
Current Fresh Radio stations
Station ID	Frequency	City	Province	Language	Owner
CHAY-FM	93.1	Barrie	Ontario	English	Corus Entertainment
CFLG-FM	104.5	Cornwall	Ontario	English	Corus Entertainment
CKWS-FM	104.3	Kingston	Ontario	English	Corus Entertainment
CKRU-FM	100.5	Peterborough	Ontario	English	Corus Entertainment
CFHK-FM	103.1	St. Thomas	Ontario	English	Corus Entertainment

=== Former Stations ===
Former Fresh Radio stations
Station ID	Frequency	City	Province	Previous Branding	Current Branding	Owner
CKNG-FM	92.5	Edmonton	Alberta	92.5 Joe FM	Chuck @ 92.5	Corus Entertainment
CING-FM	95.3	Hamilton	Ontario	Vinyl 95.3	Energy 95.3	Corus Entertainment
CFPG-FM	99.1	Winnipeg	Manitoba	Groove 99.1	Country 99	Corus Entertainment
