= CJSS-FM =

Radio station in Cornwall, Ontario

- Cornwall, Ontario; Canada
- Broadcast area: Eastern Ontario
- Frequency: 101.9 MHz
- Branding: Boom 101.9

Programming
- Format: Classic hits

Ownership
- Owner: Corus Entertainment; (Corus Premium Television Ltd.)
- Sister stations: CFLG-FM

History
- First air date: February 15, 1945
- Former call signs: CKSF (1945–1959)
- Former frequencies: 1230 kHz (AM) (1945–1958); 1220 kHz (1958–1999)
- Call sign meaning: Stanley Shenkman (original owner)

Technical information
- Class: A
- ERP: 3,000 watts
- HAAT: 88.5 metres (290 ft)
- Transmitter coordinates: 45°03′30″N 74°44′44″W

Links
- Webcast: Listen Live
- Website: boom1019.com

CJSS-FM (101.9 MHz) is a commercial radio station in Cornwall, Ontario. The station broadcasts a classic hits format branded as Boom 101.9. CJSS is owned by Corus Entertainment, which acquired the station, along with CFLG-FM, in 2001.

CJSS-FM has an effective radiated power (ERP) of 3,000 watts. The transmitter is on McConnell Avenue, near the Macdonald-Cartier Freeway (Ontario Highway 401).

== History ==
On February 15, 1945, the station signed on the air as CKSF. It was owned by the city's daily newspaper, the Cornwall Standard-Freeholder, originally at 1230 kHz with 250 watts. In 1958, it moved to 1220 kHz with 1000 watts using a directional antenna located at a site on part of Lot 7, Concession 4 in the Township of Cornwall. In 1957, the newspaper also launched 104.5 CKSF-FM. Two years later, the stations were acquired by Stanley Shankman, the owner of CJSS-TV. To match the TV station, the radio stations became CJSS-AM-FM.

By 1963, Shenkman had sold his broadcast holdings. Ernie Bushnell purchased CJSS-TV, using it as a repeater of Ottawa's CJOH-TV. The radio stations were sold to the local Émard family.

The radio stations were subsequently acquired by Tri-Co Broadcasting Ltd. in 1978. Tri-Co Broadcasting Ltd. converted CJSS from an AM station to FM on June 6, 1999. CJSS' frequency, 1220 AM, did not go dark and simulcasting the FM station until August 31. The frequency was replaced by CJUL on November 24, 2000.

On August 18, 2010, CJUL (AM 1220) left the air. Corus stated that listeners across Stormont, Dundas and Glengarry would now get up-to-date local and regional information on local radio as Corus Radio redeployed news and community event information from AM 1220 (CJUL) onto its two FM stations, CJSS-FM, and CFLG-FM.

After the flip to FM, CJSS-FM aired a country station branded as Blaze 101.9 FM. On August 8, 2003, the station shifted to an active rock format, branded as Rock 101.9.

On February 15, 2011, CJSS changed its format to classic hits, branded as Greatest Hits 101.9 FM.

On August 25, 2014, at 3 p.m., CJSS rebranded as Boom 101.9. The last song on "Greatest Hits" was "Revolution" by The Beatles, while the first song on "Boom" was "Don't Stop Believin'" by Journey.

Also on August 25, 2014, Dan Allaire and Bill Halman teamed up to become the "Boom Breakfast with Dan & Bill". Tom Schoch was introduced as the station's new midday host, followed by popular DJ Darryl Adams in the afternoon drive time slot. By October 24, 2014, Bill Halman was named Program Director for both CJSS-FM and CFLG-FM, which had been re-branded as "Fresh FM".

On April 1, 2016, Shaw Media was sold to Corus Entertainment.
