= CJOY =

Radio station in Guelph, Ontario

Coordinates: 43°29′09″N 80°14′42″W

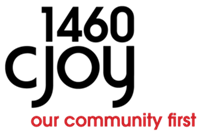
- Guelph, Ontario; Canada
- Broadcast area: Wellington County
- Frequency: 1460 kHz
- Branding: 1460 CJOY

Programming
- Format: Oldies/Classic Hits/Variety
- Affiliations: Guelph Storm

Ownership
- Owner: Corus Entertainment; (Corus Premium Television Ltd.)
- Sister stations: CIMJ-FM

History
- First air date: June 14, 1948

Technical information
- Licensing authority: CRTC
- Class: B
- Power: 10,000 watts

Links
- Webcast: Listen Live
- Website: cjoy.com

CJOY (1460 AM) is a Canadian radio station in Guelph, Ontario. The station currently broadcasts an oldies/classic hits format and is branded on-air as 1460 CJOY. CJOY's sister station is CIMJ-FM. Both stations are owned by Corus Entertainment.

== History ==
Wally Slatter and Fred Metcalf opened Guelph's first radio station CJOY, on June 14, 1948, on 1450 kHz with 250 watts power, non-directional with transmitter using one 150-foot (46 m) tower in Guelph Township, Wellington County.

On April 1, 1960, CJOY moved to 1460 kHz powered at 10,000 watts day and 5,000 watts night (full-time) from a new site on the south half of a Lot in Puslinch Township, Wellington County. This required the use of four 164-foot (overall height) towers. The station had originally proposed to move to 1430 kHz with 5,000 watts but it was decided that 1460 kHz would provide a better service.

On July 26, 1972, CJOY-AM-FM received approval to move to new studios and offices at 75 Speedvale Avenue E where it continues to broadcast today. In 1980, the transmitter site was updated and the FM station co-sited on the same property. The combined system uses three 160-foot (49 m) and one 400-foot (120 m) towers, designed by George Mather. Only one other co-sited AM/FM site existed in Canada when this was done. On April 28, 1987, Kawartha Broadcasting Co. Ltd. (which was indirectly controlled by Paul Desmarais) purchased CJOY Ltd and the Galt Broadcasting Co. Ltd. (CJOY, CKLA-FM and by then AM96 Cambridge) from principals Wally Slatter and Fred Metcalf. Other partners in AM96 were Neil Stilman, Kay Metcalf, Nancy Slatter, Bill Dawkins and Larry Smith.

The corporate name changed to Power Broadcasting Inc. in 1989.

Wally Slatter, co-founder of CJOY, died on June 2, 1995. Partner Fred Metcalf died in February 1996. They were also the founders of the first cable TV system in Canada called 'Neighborhood TV' in Guelph (1952). Metcalf's interests moved into the growing cable TV market expanding to twenty cable operations which he sold to Maclean Hunter Ltd. in 1967. He was president of that company between 1977 and 1984.

Well-known broadcasting alumni of CJOY include Norm Jary, former Mayor of Guelph and broadcaster for the New York Rangers, Gordie Tapp, Lloyd Robertson, Al Shaver, Bob Bratina, and Bob McAdorey.

Bratina was on the air November 9, 1965 when the huge black-out occurred in North-Eastern North America. The station interrupted programming to provide emergency information, but the station manager insisted the commercials for the regular Italian language program run as scheduled during the emergency broadcast.

The current owner is Corus Entertainment, who purchased the stations in 1999 from Power Broadcasting. The CRTC approved the deal on March 24, 2000. CJOY underwent major studio renovations in the fall of 2006 and the studios are completely digital. (AES 44.1 standard) The studio-to-transmitter radio link and processing was replaced with a digital system in early 2009, leaving only the exciter and transmitter as analog.

From the very start of the station, CJOY has been a vital part of the community. It provides live coverage of charity fundraisers, and on-the-spot reporting of breaking news, weather, and sports. The station also sends out its CJOY Jeep Compass to do on-site, on-air live event coverage.

As of 2022, CJOY began including newer pop hits from the 2000s and 2010s into its playlist while phasing out most classic rock songs; this change gives the station more of a soft adult contemporary sound.

== AM to FM ==
On August 21, 2008, CJOY applied to move to 95.7 MHz. This application to move from AM to FM was denied on January 23, 2009. On July 30, 2009, CJOY has yet again applied to convert to FM. CJOY's FM application was once again denied on January 28, 2010.
