= CKGE-FM =

Radio station in Oshawa, Ontario

Coordinates: 43.92561°N 78.89702°W

- Oshawa, Ontario; Canada
- Broadcast area: Greater Toronto Area
- Frequency: 94.9 MHz
- Branding: 94.9 The Rock

Programming
- Format: Active rock

Ownership
- Owner: Durham Radio Inc.

History
- First air date: September 12, 1957
- Former call signs: CKLB-FM (1957–1966); CKQS-FM (1966–1979); CKQT-FM (1979–1993)
- Former frequencies: 93.5 MHz (1957–1966)

Technical information
- Class: B
- ERP: 50,000 watts
- HAAT: 147.5 metres (484 ft)

Links
- Webcast: Listen Live
- Website: therock.fm

CKGE-FM is a Canadian radio station, broadcasting at 94.9 FM from Oshawa, Ontario. The station broadcasts an active rock format under the brand name 94.9 The Rock.

== History ==
The station was launched in 1957 by Lakeland Broadcasting as CKLB-FM 93.5, a sister station to AM outlet CKLB. The station aired an easy listening format. In 1966, the station changed its callsign to CKQS-FM, and moved to its current frequency later the same year.

In 1979, CKLB and CKQS were acquired by Grant Broadcasting, and CKQS changed callsigns again, this time to CKQT-FM. Grant Broadcasting was subsequently acquired by Power Broadcasting in 1990.

In 1993, the station moved to an adult contemporary format, adopting its current callsign and branding itself The Edge. In 1995, the station was rebranded Magic 94.9.

In 1999, the station began to more actively target audiences in Toronto, with a modern adult contemporary format incorporating into some more typically adult album alternative musical selections.

In late 2000, Power Broadcasting was acquired by Corus Entertainment. On February 16, 2001, Corus dropped Magic's format and brand, adding the station to its Energy dance music simulcast. However, in 2002, Corus' Hamilton stations swapped frequencies, and with Energy flagship CING now on a signal that more effectively covered the Toronto area, CKGE again became Magic @ 94.9, with a hot adult contemporary format, on May 3 of that year.

In 2003, Corus sold CKGE and CKDO to Durham Radio, the owner of CJKX in neighbouring Ajax. The station adopted its current format shortly after the sale on June 12. It reports as a Toronto station per Mediabase and Nielsen BDS and is the Greater Toronto market's only active rock station.

In 2012, Doug Elliott was hired as program director. The format execution and personalities quickly changed into a competitive Toronto rock radio station with the addition of Craig Venn and Lucky in mornings, Lori Ann in middays, Doug Elliott in drive and longtime Toronto rock radio host from CILQ and CHUM-FM Lee "Beef" Eckley. In May 2018, Dean Blundell joined Craig Venn and Lucky as a contributor to "Rock Mornings".

In October 2022, Christian Tanna, the drummer of 1990s Canadian rock band I Mother Earth, joined the station as host of Generation Next Radio, its program devoted to new and emerging rock musicians. In May 2023, the station added Ed the Sock as the host of an overnight program.
