= CFLG-FM =

Radio station in Cornwall, Ontario

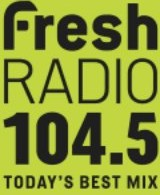
- Cornwall, Ontario; Canada
- Broadcast area: Eastern Ontario
- Frequency: 104.5 MHz
- Branding: 104.5 Fresh Radio

Programming
- Format: Hot adult contemporary

Ownership
- Owner: Corus Entertainment; (Corus Premium Television Ltd.)
- Sister stations: CJSS-FM

History
- First air date: February 15, 1949
- Former call signs: CKSF-FM (1949–1959); CJSS-FM (1959–1978)

Technical information
- Class: B
- ERP: 15,400 watts (average)
- HAAT: 88.5 metres (290 ft)
- Transmitter coordinates: 45°03′30″N 74°44′44″W

Links
- Website: 1045freshradio.ca

CFLG-FM (104.5 MHz) is a Canadian radio station in Cornwall, Ontario. The station airs a hot adult contemporary format branded as 104.5 Fresh Radio.

== History ==
The station was launched on February 15, 1949, the fourth anniversary of sister AM station CKSF's launch, by the city's daily newspaper, the Cornwall Standard-Freeholder, with the call sign CKSF-FM. Two years later, the stations were acquired by Stanley Shankman, the owner of CJSS-TV, and both changed their callsigns to CJSS as well.

Two years later, Shenkman sold his broadcast holdings. The TV station was sold to Ottawa's CJOH-TV, and the radio stations were sold to the local Émard family.

The radio stations were subsequently acquired by Tri Co Broadcasting in 1978, and the station adopted its current callsign. CFLG originally aired a beautiful music format which has since been updated to the current AC sound. They are now owned by Corus Entertainment, who acquired CFLG, along with CJSS, in 2001.

The station had been branded as Variety 104.

On August 25, 2014, at 11 a.m., CFLG changed its branding to 104.5 Fresh FM. The first song on "Fresh" was "Hideaway" by Kiesza.

On February 13, 2015, CFLG was rebranded as 104.5 Fresh Radio to reflect all other Corus Radio owned "Fresh FM" stations.

On April 1, 2016, Shaw Media was sold to Corus Entertainment. It became a sister station to CFPL-FM, CFHK-FM and other radio stations.

In late 2021, competing station WYUL, which primarily targets the Cornwall and Greater Montreal areas from across the American border, was sold to Educational Media Foundation and switched from its longtime CHR/Top 40 format. As a result, in 2022, CFLG moved into more of an adult top 40 direction, and was moved to Mediabase’s Canada top 40 panel.
