= CKRU-FM =

Radio station in Peterborough, Ontario

Coordinates: 44°17′36″N 78°21′19″W

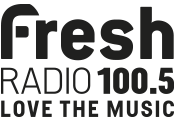
- Peterborough, Ontario; Canada
- Broadcast area: Peterborough County
- Frequency: 100.5 MHz
- Branding: 100.5 Fresh Radio

Programming
- Format: Contemporary hit radio

Ownership
- Owner: Corus Entertainment; (Corus Premium Television Ltd.)
- Sister stations: CKWF-FM, CHEX-DT

History
- First air date: 1942
- Former call signs: CHEX (1942–1992)
- Former frequencies: 1430 kHz (1942–1958); 980 kHz (1958–2009)
- Call sign meaning: Former "Kruz" brand

Technical information
- ERP: 5,000 watts (15,000 maximum)
- HAAT: 75.3 metres (247 ft)

Links
- Website: 1005freshradio.ca

CKRU-FM (100.5 MHz) is a commercial radio station in Peterborough, Ontario, Canada. It broadcasts a contemporary hit radio format. CKRU-FM is owned by Corus Entertainment and is branded as 100.5 Fresh Radio.

== History ==
The station signed on the air in 1942. The call sign was CHEX and it was an AM station at 1430 kHz. It is Peterborough's oldest radio station. In 1959, it added a television station, CHEX-TV on Channel 12.

CHEX moved to 980 kHz in 1958. The station was an affiliate of CBC Radio's Dominion Network until 1962. In 1968, an FM station was added at 101.5, which today is CKWF-FM. CHEX became CKRU in 1992. The CHEX call letters remain with Channel 12, which had separate ownership at the time.

=== Switch to FM ===
On October 11, 2007, CKRU applied to the Canadian Radio-television and Telecommunications Commission (CRTC) to convert to the FM band.

On May 8, 2008, CKRU was given approval to convert to the FM band at 96.7 MHz, however, Pineridge Broadcasting, who owns CKSG-FM and CHUC-FM in Cobourg, had selected the 96.7 FM frequency for a new adult contemporary station (CJWV-FM). As a result, CKRU had to then do research to find another FM frequency, and applied to broadcast at 100.5 FM. This application to convert CKRU from 980 AM to 100.5 FM was approved on December 1, 2008. On December 23, 2008, the licensee proposed to change the authorized contours by decreasing the average effective radiated power from 50,000 watts to 7,500 watts.

On June 15, 2009, CKRU launched its new signal on 100.5 FM. The new programming on 100.5 FM was simulcast on the old AM 980 signal until it was shut down on September 28, 2009. CKRU was Peterborough's first and last AM radio station. On October 25, 2010, just over a year after the AM transmitter was turned off, the former AM 980 transmitters were torn down. After moving to FM, the new station became classic hits branded as 100.5 Kruz FM and featured greatest hits of the 1960s, 1970s and 1980s. In later years, the station added 1990s and current music to its playlist.

On August 29, 2014, CKRU flipped from classic hits/oldies to hot adult contemporary and rebranded to Hits 100.5. In February 2015, the station re-branded as 100.5 Fresh Radio, with a contemporary hit radio format.

== Notable announcers ==
- John Badham, 1988 to 2011
