= CJOT-FM =

Radio station in Ottawa

Coordinates: 45°13′01″N 75°33′50″W

- Ottawa, Ontario; Canada
- Broadcast area: National Capital Region
- Frequency: 99.7 MHz
- Branding: Boom 99.7

Programming
- Language: English
- Format: Classic hits

Ownership
- Owner: Corus Entertainment; (8324433 Canada Inc.)
- Sister stations: CKQB-FM

History
- First air date: May 27, 2010
- Call sign meaning: Ottawa

Technical information
- Class: C1
- ERP: 38,000 watts (100,000 watts maximum)
- HAAT: 161 metres (528 ft)

Links
- Webcast: Listen Live
- Website: boom997.com

CJOT-FM (99.7 FM, "Boom 99.7") is a radio station licensed to Ottawa, Ontario. Owned by Corus Entertainment, it broadcasts a classic hits format.

CJOT's studios and offices are located on Merivale Road in Nepean along with sister station CKQB-FM. The transmitter is located off Stagecoach Road (Route 25) in Greely, southeast of Ottawa.

== History ==
On August 26, 2008, the CRTC approved applications by Astral Media and Frank Torres for two new FM licenses in Ottawa, which would be devoted to popular music and blues respectively. The approval of the station proved controversial; on November 21, 2008, Minister of Heritage James Moore issued a statement calling on the CRTC to review its approval of both the Astral station and Frank Torres' new CIDG-FM. Moore asked the commission to assess whether the francophone population of the Ottawa-Gatineau area was sufficiently well-served by existing French radio services, and to consider licensing one or more of the French language applications—which included a Christian music station, a community radio station and a campus radio station for the Université du Québec en Outaouais—in addition to or instead of the approved stations.

In the resulting round of hearings, Torres proposed that a new francophone station could be licensed on 94.5 FM, although such a station would be second-adjacent to Astral's CIMF-FM. Industry Canada subsequently aired a testing signal on 94.5 in May 2009 to determine whether the signal could be used without impacting CIMF. The test found that the signal could be used without causing significant interference to CIMF, and Astral consequently gave its consent to the use of the frequency as long as the company retained authorization to launch the 99.7 station.

The station officially launched on May 27, 2010 as CJOT-FM, with an adult contemporary format branded as 99.7 EZ Rock. On June 30, 2011, CJOT flipped to classic hits as Boom 99.7.

In March 2013, as part of Bell Media's proposed acquisition of Astral Media, Corus Entertainment reached an agreement to acquire assets from the company to comply with concentration of media ownership rules, including CJOT and sister station CKQB-FM. The acquisition was closed on January 31, 2014.

An unprotected low-power tourist information radio station owned by Instant Information Services operated at 99.7 FM as CIIO-FM. That station was authorised by the CRTC in May 2010 to move to 97.5 MHz. As well, CKQB-FM operated a repeater at 99.7 FM in Pembroke, which later moved to 99.9 FM.
