= CKWF-FM =

Radio station in Peterborough, Ontario

Coordinates: 44°19′41″N 78°17′58″W

- Peterborough, Ontario; Canada
- Broadcast area: Peterborough County
- Frequency: 101.5 MHz
- Branding: The Wolf 101.5

Programming
- Format: Active rock

Ownership
- Owner: Corus Entertainment; (Corus Premium Television Ltd.)
- Sister stations: CKRU-FM, CHEX-DT

History
- First air date: 1947
- Former call signs: CHEX-FM (1947–1976); CFMP-FM (1976–1992)
- Call sign meaning: WF for Wolf

Technical information
- Licensing authority: CRTC
- Class: B
- ERP: 15,200 watts
- HAAT: 273.2 metres (896 ft)

Links
- Webcast: Listen Live
- Website: thewolf.ca

CKWF-FM is a radio station in Peterborough, Ontario, Canada, broadcasting at 101.5 FM, with an active rock format branded as "The Wolf 101.5". The station is owned by Corus Entertainment.

== History ==
The station began broadcasting in 1947 as CHEX-FM. In 1976, the call letters were changed to CFMP-FM ("FMP" stands for FM Peterborough). Over the years since CHEX-FM went on the air in the 1940s, the station underwent numerous ownership, technical and format changes. On February 14, 1992, the station rebranded as The Wolf, adopting a rock format and changing its call letters to CKWF-FM. In January 1998, the transmitter tower for CKWF-FM, and its sister station, CHEX-DT, was severely damaged due to ice buildup on the structure. A new 1000-foot TV-FM tower was built beside the old one in 2003.

The original studio and office complex for CKWF and its sister stations were located beside the transmission tower on Television Road, on the east end of the city. Due to concerns about the tower's stability, the studios were relocated in 1999 to downtown Peterborough, at the corner of King St. and George St. They are accessible to both listeners and performers.

== Notable announcers ==
- John Badham, 1988 to 2011
