= CJDV-FM =

Radio station in Kitchener, Ontario, Canada

Coordinates: 43.4084°N 80.3932°W

- Kitchener, Ontario; Canada
- Broadcast area: Waterloo Region
- Frequency: 107.5 MHz
- Branding: 107.5 Dave Rocks

Programming
- Format: Active rock

Ownership
- Owner: Corus Entertainment; (591589 B.C. Ltd.)
- Sister stations: CKBT-FM

History
- First air date: 1954
- Former call signs: CKGR (1954–1956); CFTJ (1956–1987); CIAM (1987–1998); CIZN-FM (1998–2003)
- Former frequencies: 1110 kHz (1954–1975); 1320 kHz (1975–1977); 960 kHz (1977–1998); 92.9 MHz (1998–2003)
- Call sign meaning: "Dave" (branding)

Technical information
- Licensing authority: CRTC
- Class: A
- ERP: 2,500 watts (average); 6,000 watts (peak)
- HAAT: 68.9 metres (226 ft)

Links
- Webcast: Listen Live
- Website: 1075daverocks.com

CJDV-FM is a Canadian radio station broadcasting at 107.5 FM in Kitchener, Ontario owned by Corus Entertainment. The station airs an active rock format branded on-air as 107.5 Dave Rocks.

CJDV's studios are located at Sportsworld Crossing, while its transmitter is located near Franklin Boulevard and Sheldon Drive in Cambridge.

== History ==
In 1954, Galt Broadcasting launched CKGR, 1110 AM, a daytimer. With an ownership change in 1956, the station adopted the new call sign CFTJ.

In 1975, CFTJ moved to AM 1320, and CKKW in nearby Kitchener moved from 1320 to 1090. Concurrently with this change, CFTJ moved to 24-hour broadcasting. This was planned as a temporary move — with CFGM in Richmond Hill scheduled to move to the 1320 frequency in 1978, CFTJ moved again to AM 960 in 1977.

In 1987, the station changed its call sign again, to CIAM, and was acquired by Kawartha Broadcasting. Kawartha became a division of Power Broadcasting in 1989.

On June 25, 1997, the station was licensed by the CRTC to move to the FM band. It completed the move on May 25, 1998, launching on 92.9 FM with the new call sign CIZN-FM and a hot adult contemporary format branded as The Zone.

In 2000, the station was purchased by its current owner, Corus Entertainment. Corus applied to the CRTC to move the station's frequency to 107.5 in 2002, due to the weak 92.9 signal impairing the station's financial stability. On February 14, 2003, the station received CRTC approval. CIZN left the air on July 20, 2003. On July 21, 2003, the station launched on 107.5 FM with its current call sign CJDV-FM and adopted a classic hits format known as 107.5 Dave FM, 80's, 90's, Anything We Feel Like.

Dave FM logo (2006–2009)

In 2006, the CRTC denied Corus's application to increase CJDV's average effective radiated power (ERP) from 2,500 watts to 6,800 watts. In certain regions of its market area, CJDV has experienced recurring co-channel interference from CKMB-FM in Barrie, Ontario which also operates at 107.5 MHz.

On January 14, 2009, at 8 a.m., CJDV changed its format to mainstream rock and adopted a new slogan "Tri-Cities' Best Rock" but kept the "Dave FM" branding.

On August 14, 2009, CJDV moved into a new broadcast facility with sister station CKBT-FM at 50 Sportsworld Crossing Road, Kitchener.

Dave FM Rock logo

As of April 2016, CJDV is branded as 107.5 Dave Rocks with an active rock format.
