= CKQB-FM =

Contemporary hit radio station in Ottawa

Coordinates: 45.3586°N 75.7372°W

- Ottawa, Ontario; Canada
- Broadcast area: National Capital Region, Eastern Ontario, Western Quebec
- Frequency: 106.9 MHz
- Branding: Jump! 106.9

Programming
- Language: English
- Format: Contemporary hit radio

Ownership
- Owner: Corus Entertainment; (8324433 Canada Inc.)
- Sister stations: CJOT-FM

History
- First air date: August 31, 1982
- Former call signs: CJSB (1982–1994)
- Former frequencies: 540 kHz (1982–1994)

Technical information
- Licensing authority: CRTC
- Class: C1
- ERP: 84,000 watts
- HAAT: 323 metres (1,060 ft)
- Repeater: CKQB-FM-1 99.9 Pembroke

Links
- Webcast: player.jumpradio.ca
- Website: jumpradio.ca

CKQB-FM (106.9 FM, Jump! 106.9) is a radio station licensed to Ottawa, Ontario, Canada. Owned by Corus Entertainment, it broadcasts a contemporary hit radio format. CKQB's studios are located at 1504 Merivale Road in Nepean along with sister station CJOT-FM, while its transmitter is located in Camp Fortune, Quebec.

== History ==
The station was launched on August 31, 1982, by Standard Broadcasting at 540 AM, with the call sign CJSB and a power of 50,000 watts (daytime) and 10,000 watts (nighttime). The station was initially a mixture of MOR music and talk programming, then became an adult standards/easy listening (Music of Your Life) station, and in January 1987, evolved into a soft adult contemporary format with the brand name 54 Lite Rock. The station also aired Top 40 music.

In 1988, the station adopted a mainstream rock format and the brand name 54 Rock. In June 1989, the station's nighttime power was increased from 10,000 watts to 12,500 watts in an effort to extend their coverage area in the west-end of Ottawa. Through all the changes, the station continued to lose money.

In 1993, after 11 years without a profit on AM, the station applied to move to the FM band using the available 106.9 frequency that had been occupied by CKO from 1977 to 1989. This was the first time the CRTC had allowed a commercial station in a major market to switch from AM to FM.

The AM station signed off the air at 9 am on August 31, 1994, and the FM station signed on at 6 pm on September 1, with the new brand name 106.9 FM The Bear and changed its call sign to CKQB-FM. Darren Stevens became the first personality to be heard on the new station during a live broadcast from Minglewoods bar in the Byward Market.

In 2004, CKQB was given approval by the Canadian Radio-television and Telecommunications Commission to operate an FM transmitter at Pembroke on 99.7 MHz, to rebroadcast the programming of CKQB's main station in Ottawa and provide better service to CKQB's listeners in Pembroke and in the surrounding west Ottawa Valley area.

The station's music director, Kath Thompson, won the Canadian Music Industry Award for music director of the Year (Major Market) in 2007. On October 29, 2007, Astral Media took control of CKQB as a result of its takeover of Standard Broadcasting.

On December 4, 2008, Astral Media announced that CKQB, along with sister stations CJFM-FM in Montreal and CKZZ-FM in Vancouver, would be rebranded as a Virgin Radio station in January 2009. This was in addition to an existing "Virgin" station, CKFM-FM in Toronto. CKQB featured a "re-energized" rock format, as opposed to a hot adult contemporary format at the other "Virgin" stations in Canada. The Toronto "Virgin" flipped to contemporary hit radio the following year.

The rebranding was completed at 4 pm on January 9. The first song after the relaunch was "London Calling" by The Clash. The station subsequently faced criticism for its inaugural promotional campaign, which featured images of pregnant young women accompanied by the slogan "Lock up your daughters, the gods of rock are now in Ottawa." The station dropped the advertisements after a number of listeners filed complaints.

On August 26, Astral applied to change Pembroke's repeater frequency (CKQB-FM-1) to 99.9 MHz to mitigate interference due to the approval of Astral's new FM station in Ottawa at 99.7 MHz. The move to 99.9 received CRTC approval on October 14, 2009.

CKQB's studios are located at the broadcasting complex shared by its former sister station CJOH-TV, on Merivale Road in Nepean. On February 7, 2010, CJOH-TV's studios were gutted by a four-alarm fire in the pre-dawn hours; CKQB-FM's studios, located in a separate building, were not affected.

In 2010, following the reformatting of francophone station CFTX-FM as a mainstream rock station, CKQB switched to an active rock format. On February 4, 2011, the station dropped the "Virgin" branding, returning to its former "Bear" identity.

On January 28, 2014, the CRTC approved Corus's acquisition of CKQB and sister station CJOT-FM. The acquisition was closed on January 31.

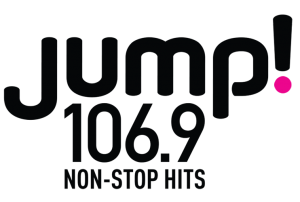
Previous Jump! 106.9 logo under former "Non Stop Hits" slogan used from 2014–2020

On March 6, Corus announced that CKQB would drop its rock music format by the end of the month, releasing a letter on the station's website promising a "fresh, new direction", with rumours following afterwards that suggested the station was to flip to hot adult contemporary as part of Corus' national "Fresh FM" brand (which only furthered when it had been discovered Corus had registered several web domains with the station's frequency position in it around that same time). The station would run jockless in the meantime, with no on-air staff. On March 28, at 5 p.m., after playing "Jump" by Van Halen, CKQB began stunting with nature sounds and ambient chill music, while promoting an announcement to come at 11 a.m. the following Monday, March 31. At that time, CKQB flipped to contemporary hit radio as Jump! 106.9; the first song as "Jump" was "Animals" by Martin Garrix. The new format would compete primarily with the dominant CIHT-FM, and Rogers' CISS-FM, contrasting their AC-leaning formats with a younger-skewing rhythmic direction, and a "very strong" social media presence.

In September 2018, CKQB laid off its morning hosts Jesse Reynolds and Jenna Mo, and announced that they would be replaced by the syndicated Brooke & Jubal (originating from KQMV in Seattle, Washington). Corus claimed that the change was intended to "maximize how we deliver content to listeners and further position radio brands for the future", but was widely criticized by listeners for replacing the local hosts with syndicated talent from the United States. What would later become Brooke & Jeffery was replaced by Tucker & Maura from sister station CFNY-FM in Toronto in November 2023.

More sweeping cuts were made to CKQB’s on-air talent on June 10, 2025, as nearly all of the station’s hosts (including those at sister station CJOT), production staff, and music direction were laid off as part of Corus' restructuring initiatives. This included longtime afternoon drive host Dayna Brez and weekend/swing announcer Drew (Andrew Schofield).

== Compilation albums ==
- Homegrown '89 (1989 - Cassette issue when branded as 54 Rock)
- Homegrown '90 (1990 - Cassette issue when branded as 54 Rock)
- Unmuted: Ottawa Recording Artists United Against AIDS (1996)
- Unmuted II (1997)
