= CKBT-FM =

Radio station in Kitchener, Ontario

Coordinates: 43°15′39″N 80°26′38″W

- Kitchener, Ontario; Canada
- Broadcast area: Waterloo Region
- Frequency: 91.5 MHz
- Branding: 91.5 The Beat

Programming
- Format: Contemporary hit radio

Ownership
- Owner: Corus Entertainment; (Corus Premium Television Ltd.)
- Sister stations: CJDV-FM

History
- First air date: January 31, 2004
- Call sign meaning: Kitchener Beat

Technical information
- Class: B
- ERP: 3,600 watts average 10,000 watts peak
- HAAT: 232.5 metres (763 ft)

Links
- Webcast: Listen Live
- Website: 915thebeat.com

CKBT-FM (91.5 MHz) is a Canadian radio station licensed to Kitchener, Ontario, and serving the Waterloo Region. It is owned by Corus Entertainment with studios on Speedvale Avenue East in Guelph. It broadcasts a contemporary hit radio format branded as 91.5 The Beat.

CKBT-FM has an effective radiated power (ERP) of 3,600 watts (10,000 watts peak) using a directional antenna. Its transmitter is on Ayr Road (Ontario Highway 15) in Brant.

== History ==
The station was launched by CanWest Global on January 31, 2004. The original studios were at 235 King Street East, Suite 120, Kitchener. The station originally aired a Rhythmic Top 40 format (e.g. hip hop, reggae and R&B), until switching to its current format in 2007.

In September 2006, Corus Entertainment, already owner of CJDV-FM in nearby Cambridge, announced it would buy CKBT and Winnipeg's CJZZ-FM (now CFPG-FM) from CanWest, subject to Canadian Radio-television and Telecommunications Commission (CRTC) approval. The transaction was approved by the CRTC on July 6, 2007, and as of July 29, 2007, CKBT was officially made part of Corus Entertainment's radio properties.

On August 14, 2009, CKBT moved into broadcast facility with sister station CJDV-FM at 50 Sportsworld Crossing Road, Kitchener. The stations later relocated to Speedvale Drive in Guelph.

Former logo (2008–2017)
