= Corus Entertainment =

Canadian media and production company

Corus Entertainment Holdings Inc.
- Logo used since 2016

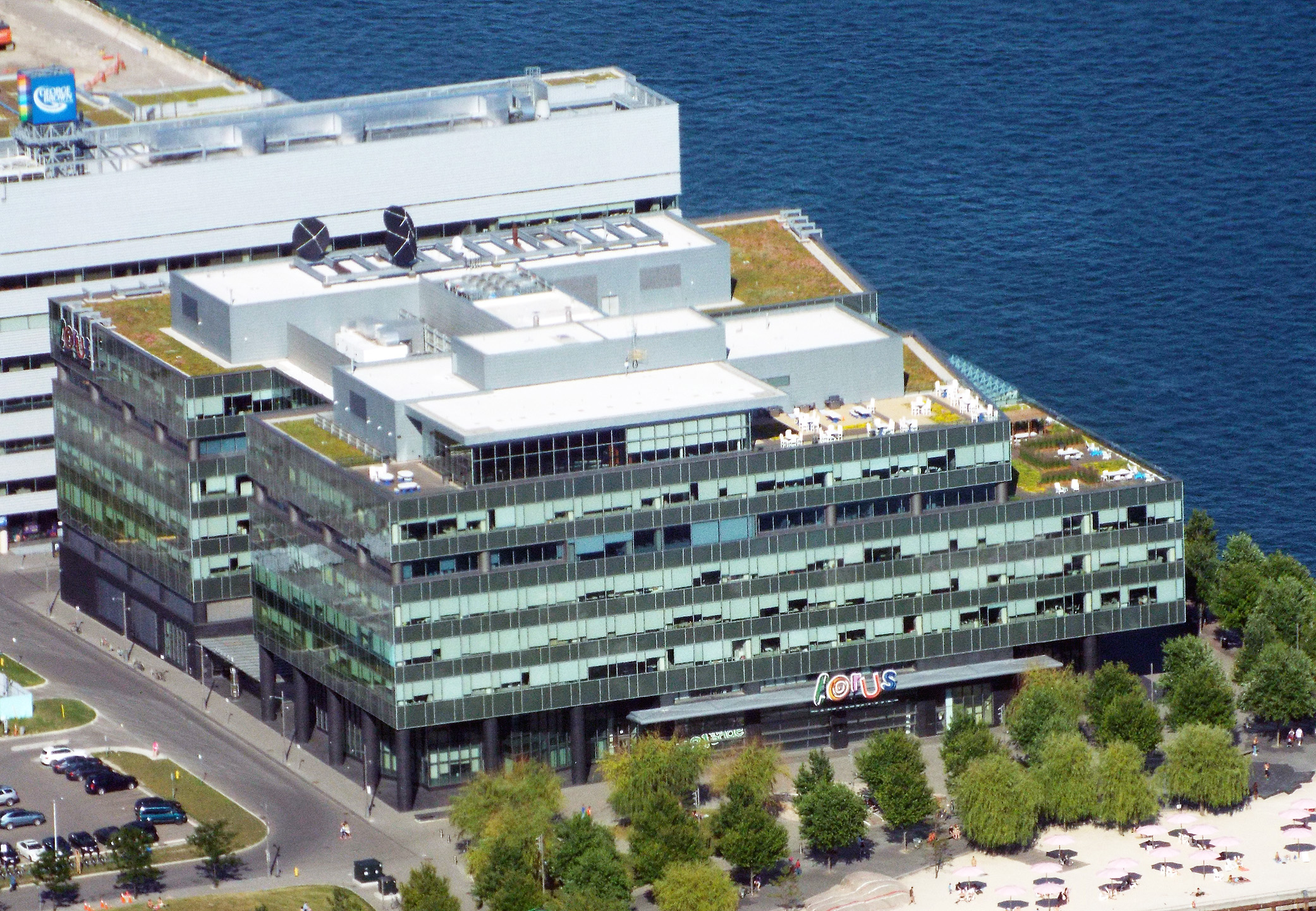
- Corus' headquarters, Corus Quay in Toronto, as seen from the CN Tower
- Formerly: Shaw Radio Ltd. (1987–1999); Corus Entertainment Inc. (1999–2026)
- Type: Public
- Traded as: TSX: CORS (as of October 13, 2026); TSX: CJR.B (non-voting, 1999–Oct. 9, 2026); NYSE: CJR (until 2010)
- Industry: Mass media Broadcasting
- Predecessor: Shaw Communications (broadcasting and networks division); Western International Communications; Canwest; Alliance Atlantis (broadcasting and networks division); Power Corporation of Canada (broadcasting division); Shaw Media
- Founded: August 27, 1987; 39 years ago (as Shaw Radio Ltd.); September 1, 1999; 27 years ago (as Corus Entertainment Inc.); October 8, 2026; 45 days ago (as Corus Entertainment Holdings Inc.)
- Headquarters: Corus Quay, Toronto, Ontario, Canada
- Key people: John Gossling (CEO and CFO); Maryann Turcke (non-executive chair)
- Revenue: ▲$1.647 billion CAD (2018)
- Owner: Canso Investment Counsel (44%)
- Number of employees: 3,500 (2021)
- Divisions: Television; Radio
- Subsidiaries: Nelvana Limited; Kids Can Press; Corus Studios
- Website: www.corusent.com

Corus Entertainment Holdings Inc., commonly known as Corus Entertainment or simply Corus, is a Canadian mass media, television production, and distribution company. It was founded in 1987 as Shaw Radio Ltd. and later formed in 1999 as a spin-off from Shaw Communications, it has prominent holdings in the radio, publishing, and television industries. Corus is headquartered at Corus Quay in Toronto, Ontario.

Corus has a large presence in Canadian broadcasting as owner of the national Global network (15 conventional stations), Corus Radio consisting of 36 radio stations, and a portfolio of 25 specialty television services, the company's domestic specialty brands include DejaView, DTour, Flavour Network, Home Network, Showcase, SériesPlus, Slice, Télétoon, Treehouse, W Network, and YTV. It also operates services under brand licensing agreements with A&E Networks (History, Lifetime, and Crime & Investigation), Disney Kids & Family (Disney Channel and National Geographic), and Skydance (including CMT, Cartoon Network, Boomerang, and Adult Swim).

Corus also owns the animation studio Nelvana, and children's publisher Kids Can Press. The second incarnation of Shaw's media division (formed from the properties of the bankrupt Canwest Global) was subsumed by Corus on April 1, 2016, giving it control of the over-the-air Global network and 19 additional specialty channels. In May 2019, Shaw announced that it would sell its shares in Corus for roughly $500 million. In 2026, the company was reorganized, with creditors taking control from the Shaw family.

== History ==
=== Early history ===
Corus' original logo, used until 2016

In August 1987, Shaw Communications expanded into broadcasting by acquiring two Red Deer radio stations, CIZZ-FM and CKGY-FM. Further acquisitions by Shaw during this period included CISN-FM Edmonton (1988), CHAY-FM Barrie (1990), CKDK-FM Woodstock (1991), and CFOX-FM and CKLG-AM Vancouver (1992). In 1995, it acquired CUC Broadcasting's 34% stake of YTV. Shaw acquired Rogers' remaining shares of YTV in 1998.

=== Establishment ===
In September 1998, JR Shaw and Shaw Media CEO John Cassaday announced plans for Shaw to spin off its media properties—including radio stations and television specialty channels—into a new company that would be known as Corus Entertainment; the spin-off would leave Shaw as a "pure play" telecommunications company. The decision was meant to comply with Canadian Radio-television and Telecommunications Commission (CRTC) recommendations that discouraged the vertical integration of broadcasters and television providers. Corus would be a separate, publicly traded company, first listed on the Toronto Stock Exchange in September 1999, but it would still be primarily controlled by the Shaw family.

In September 1999, Corus acquired the broadcasting assets of the Power Corporation of Canada, which included four television stations and sixteen radio stations. One of these stations, CHAU-TV, was later re-sold to Télé Inter-Rives. In October 1999, after a battle between Shaw and Canwest for control of the company, it was announced that Western International Communications (WIC) would be split between the two companies: Corus would acquire WIC's 12 radio stations and most of its specialty channels, including stakes in Family Channel, SuperChannel and MovieMax!.

==== Growth and acquisitions ====
In September 2000, after negotiations and rumoured offers by other studios, Corus announced that it would acquire the Toronto-based animation studio and entertainment company Nelvana for $540 million; the deal was considered to be a complement to its children's television networks (which had often acquired programming from Nelvana), including YTV, Treehouse, and its stakes in Family Channel, Teletoon, and its French counterpart Télétoon. Corus also stated that it planned to use the purchase to help launch a preschool-oriented cable network in the U.S.

In March 2001, in response to complaints by the CRTC over its near-monopoly on ownership of children's specialty channels in Canada, Corus sold its stake in Family Channel to Astral Media for $126.9 million, making it a sister channel to The Movie Network and giving them full ownership. Corus also sold its stake in the Western Canadian pay-per-view service Viewers Choice to Shaw for $22.6 million, and acquired the Women's Television Network (WTN) from Shaw (which had acquired the channel through its acquisition of cable provider Moffat Communications) for $132.6 million. In August 2002, Corus sold CKDO and CKGE-FM to Durham Radio.

On March 4, 2002, Corus announced that it would sell Klutz, which had been acquired two years prior as part of their purchase of Nelvana, to American publishing company Scholastic with the acquisition being completed by the following month. In May of that same year, Corus announced that it had acquired a 50% stake in Locomotion, a Latin American Spanish-language channel focusing primarily of animated television series targeting teens and young adults. Hearst Corporation owned the other half.

In 2003, Doug Murphy replaced John Cassaday as CEO.

In March 2004, Corus and Astral announced that it would acquire and swap radio stations in Quebec; Corus acquired the Radiomédia network (including CKAC), Quebec City's CFOM, and Sherbrooke's CKTS, while Astral acquired CFVM-FM Amqui, CJOI-FM and CIKI-FM Rimouski, CFZZ-FM Saint-Jean-sur-Richelieu, and CJDM-FM Drummondville. Corus also sold its Red Deer, Alberta stations CKGY-FM and CIZZ-FM to Newcap Radio.

In July 2007, Corus acquired CKBT-FM and CJZZ-FM from Canwest. In June 2008, CHRC was sold to the ownership group of the Quebec Remparts hockey team.

=== Additional partnerships, Corus Québec sale ===
In August 2007, Corus Entertainment announced a partnership with Hearst Corporation to launch Cosmopolitan TV. In March 2008, CTVglobemedia sold Canadian Learning Television to Corus for $73 million.

Corus launched a Canadian version of Nickelodeon on November 2, 2009, replacing the localized version of Discovery Kids. In 2010, Shaw Communications re-entered the broadcasting industry through its acquisition of the media assets of the bankrupt Canwest, which re-formed the Shaw Media division.

On April 30, 2010, Corus announced that it would sell its Québec radio stations, with the exception of CKRS, to Cogeco for $80 million, pending CRTC approval. Corus cited their low profitability in comparison to their stations elsewhere as reasoning for the sale. On June 25, it was reported that Corus had agreed to sell CKRS to Radio Saguenay, a local business group. The sale of the Corus Québec stations was approved by the CRTC on December 17, 2010, on the condition that Cogeco-owned CJEC-FM and Corus-owned CFEL-FM and CKOY-FM be sold to another party by December 2011.

On September 28, 2010, the company relocated its broadcasting headquarters from 64 Jefferson Avenue to the newly built Corus Quay.

On November 9, 2010, Hasbro Studios signed an agreement with Corus to broadcast their productions on its networks.

In March 2012, Corus and Shaw launched ABC Spark, a localized version of U.S. cable network ABC Family, with Shaw owning 49%. In July 2012, the Teletoon Canada venture (50% with Astral Media) similarly launched a Canadian version of Cartoon Network and Adult Swim.

=== Re-organization ===
In March 2013, as part of Bell Media's proposed acquisition of Astral Media, Corus reached a deal to acquire Astral's stakes in Historia, Séries+, and Teletoon Canada Inc., as well as the Ottawa radio stations CJOT-FM and CKQB-FM, for $400.6 million. This aspect of the deal, intended to quell concerns from the CRTC regarding Bell's total market share after the merger, was approved by the Competition Bureau on March 18, 2013. In an unrelated deal, Corus also announced that it would acquire Shaw Media's stakes in ABC Spark, Historia, and Séries+ in exchange for cash and its minority stake in Food Network Canada. Corus indicated that these purchases were meant to help the company expand its television holdings in the competitive Quebec market. Corus also planned to open a new office in Montreal following the sale. On January 1, 2014, the acquisition was completed.

On September 1, 2013, Corus's television business was reorganized into five divisions; Corus Kids, Corus Women and Family, Corus Content Distribution and Pay TV, Corus Airtime Sales and Corus Média (for French-language assets). The Corus Kids division was subdivided into operations for their eight TV channels, Nelvana, and Kids Can Press.

==== Acquisition of Disney Channel program rights, closure of Movie Central ====
On April 16, 2015, Corus Entertainment announced that it had reached an agreement with the Disney–ABC Television Group to acquire long-term, Canadian multi-platform rights to distribute Disney Channel's programming library and associated brands; the agreement succeeded a previous agreement with Family Channel and DHX Media. As part of the agreement, Corus launched Disney Channel and the French-language La Chaîne Disney on September 1, 2015, while new Corus-owned Disney Junior and Disney XD channels would launch at a later date. Corus also discontinued the Teletoon Retro brand the same day: the programming of Cartoon Network was moved under the license of the English version (which widened its availability on providers such as Rogers and Shaw to reach over five million households), and the French version was relaunched as the aforementioned La Chaîne Disney.

On November 20, 2015, Corus announced that it would close Movie Central and Encore Avenue on March 1, 2016, in order to focus more on its mainstream specialty channels. Corus reached an agreement to migrate Movie Central subscribers to Bell Media's The Movie Network and TMN Encore, ending the regional monopolies that TMN and Movie Central held in eastern and western Canada respectively. Bell Media made a payment of $211 million to Corus for assistance in coordinating this migration, which included waiving its joint rights to HBO programming to Bell.

==== Acquisition of Shaw Media ====
On January 13, 2016, Corus Entertainment announced that it would acquire Shaw Media for $2.65 billion, with Shaw Communications taking a 39% share of Corus stock. The division consisted primarily of the broadcasting assets of the former Canwest, including the Global broadcast network and 19 other specialty channels, such as Food Network, HGTV, Showcase, History, and Slice. The transaction was being used to fund Shaw Communications' purchase of wireless carrier Wind Mobile. Corus CEO Doug Murphy described the acquisition as "transformational" and "[redefining] Corus and Canada's media landscape".

As Corus and Shaw were both controlled by the Shaw family, the CRTC officially classified the transaction as a reorganization of its assets. This meant that it was exempt from regulatory scrutiny such as concentration of media ownership and tangible benefits rules. The reorganization was approved on March 23, 2016, and completed on April 1, 2016. At the same time, multiple Shaw Media executives joined Corus (including its former CEO Barbara Williams, as its new executive VP and COO), and the company adopted a new logo.

On October 17, 2017, Bell Media announced its intent to acquire Historia and Séries+ from Corus for $200 million, which would have reunited them with former Astral Media channels such as Canal D, Canal Vie, Vrak, and Z. Corus stated that the two channels were not part of its "strategic priorities" at this time. On May 28, 2018, the sale was blocked and rejected by the Competition Bureau, for violating conditions imposed on Bell that prohibits the company from regaining ownership of divested Astral properties for 10 years.

=== Expanded partnerships, sale of Shaw Communications share, and network closures ===
On June 13, 2018, The Globe and Mail reported that the Shaw family were exploring the sale of its shares in Corus, in order to fund future expansion of the Freedom Mobile business. In its third-quarter financial report, Corus reported a year-over-year loss of $91 million, in comparison to a profit of $133 million in 2017. Corus also took a $1.013 billion write-down on its broadcasting businesses, resulting in a quarterly loss of $935.9 million, and cut its dividend to 24 cents. Doug Murphy acknowledged changes to the market climate for television, and stated that the company would have a larger focus on automated and "microtargeted" advertising sales going forward (in particular, using artificial intelligence to analyze information from set-top boxes to determine the best advertising strategies).

On March 4, 2019, Corus announced that Action would be relaunched as Adult Swim on April 1; it marked the first time that the brand—then a block on Cartoon Network—would be used for a 24-hour television channel.

In May 2019, Shaw announced it would sell its shares in Corus in a secondary offering, at a valuation of $548 million. The sale was expected to be completed by the end of the month.

In June 2019, Corus was announced as a launch partner for Amazon Prime Video Channels in Canada, offering a subscription-based bundle known as StackTV with access to live and on-demand programs from five Global TV stations and eleven Corus specialty services. At the same time, Corus would also launch a separate Nickelodeon SVOD channel known as Nick+.

IFC Canada and CosmoTV closed on September 30, 2019. FYI would later close on December 31, 2019.

In March 2020, Corus replaced the individual mobile apps for most of its specialty channels with the Global TV App, which featured content from Global, Global News, Food Network, HGTV, History, Showcase, Slice, and W Network on-launch. The app encompasses the TV Everywhere streaming of programming from the networks for their subscribers, and also features free ad-supported streaming television (FAST) content from Corus' networks.

In June and July 2020, Corus reached two content agreements with subsidiaries of Comcast, including Canadian rights to original series produced for its U.S. streaming service Peacock (NBCUniversal) on June 23, 2020, and Canadian rights to original productions from British subsidiary Sky Studios via NBCUniversal Global Distribution (the agreements exclude DreamWorks Animation's television subsidiary, which has a pre-existing output agreement with WildBrain).

BBC Canada was shut down on December 31, 2020; Blue Ant Media would launch a spiritual successor, BBC First, in March 2021.

In October 2021, Corus partnered with Discovery, Inc. on Canadian marketing for its Discovery+ streaming service.

DIY Network was rebranded to a Canadian version of Magnolia Network on March 28, 2022.

On September 1, 2022, Nick+ was discontinued and replaced by Teletoon+, which is primarily drawn from the Cartoon Network Studios and Warner Bros. Animation libraries.

In December 2022, Corus partnered with Paramount Global on launching its FAST service Pluto TV in Canada, with Corus handling Canadian marketing, advertising sales, and contributing channels featuring content from its library and Global News.

On February 21, 2023, Corus announced that Teletoon would be rebranded as Cartoon Network on March 27, 2023, and that the existing Cartoon Network channel in Canada would be relaunched as a Canadian version of sibling brand Boomerang (focusing primarily on library content from the Cartoon Network and Warner Bros. Animation libraries). The rebrand would not affect the French Télétoon channel, nor Teletoon+.

==== Financial issues, loss of licensing agreements ====
On May 25, 2023, Eastlink revealed that it was in a carriage dispute with Corus, resulting in the removal of all Corus-owned specialty channels and Global On Demand from its services on June 27, 2023. The dispute ended on June 6, 2024, with all of its channels restored to its services, albeit with subscribers required to obtain them via Corus-specific theme packs.

On July 13, 2023, Corus announced the sale of animation software developer Toon Boom to the private equity firm TPG Inc. for $147.5 million to help pay down its debts. On October 27, 2023, Corus announced the suspension of its dividend and intention to redirect the use of free cash flow from dividends to debt repayment. The company's headquarters, Corus Quay was sold to George Brown College. Corus continues to be the building's primary tenant, with their lease set to expire on March 22, 2033.

On May 13, 2024, the CRTC approved an "exceptional" request from Corus to reduce its mandatory expenditures into programs of national interest (PNI) from 8.5% to 5% of revenue, allowing it to be reallocated to other forms of Canadian content such as local news. The measure was intended primarily to help offset the loss of news funding that occurred as a result of the sale of Shaw Communications to Rogers Communications, who reallocated Shaw's community television expenditures in metropolitan markets from Global News to CityNews. The Canadian Media Producers Association requested an appeal, alleging that Corus was non-compliant with the requirement that 75% of the PNI expenditures must involve independent producers.

On June 6, 2024, Corus disclosed that Warner Bros. Discovery (WBD) had declined to renew some of its brand licensing agreements with the company, which would expire at the end of 2024. While specific details were not revealed at that time, Murphy alluded to the situation as being an "unfortunate example of inequitable structural relationships in the Canadian media and telecom industries, particularly affecting independent broadcasters like Corus". On June 10, 2024, rival broadcaster Rogers Sports & Media announced an exclusive licensing agreement with WBD, under which the rights to all WBD lifestyle and factual brands (such as Food Network and HGTV, as well as Discovery Channel—which had previously been licensed to Bell Media) would move to Rogers platforms beginning in 2025. In addition, the rights to Bravo original programming (which had largely been carried by Slice) would also move to Rogers in September 2024 under a separate agreement with NBCUniversal, resulting in the launch of a new Bravo-branded channel. The agreements had a negative impact on Corus' share price, to the point that a TD analyst suggested that losing the rights to the brands would make the company's shares worthless. Corus stated that some of the affected channels would be rebranded with alternate programming sources, but later clarified that some channels may be closed instead.

On June 17, 2024, amid these uncertainties, Murphy announced that he would retire as CEO; he was jointly succeeded by Corus CFO Troy Reeb and executive vice president of networks and content John Gossling. That month, Corus had also begun layoffs at Global News, and shut down its Edmonton and Vancouver all-news and traffic radio stations 880 CHQT and 730 CKGO (the two stations would respectively simulcast their parent news/talk stations 630 CHED and 980 CKNW in the interim; later on, CHED and CKNW would permanently move to 880 and 730 due to improved signal coverage). Corus later announced that the Oprah Winfrey Network would close on September 1, 2024, reducing the specialty channel headcount to 32. On July 15, citing a "challenging advertising environment", Gossling stated during a third-quarter earnings report that the company planned to cut 300 more positions by the end of August (a total of 800 since September 2022) and "aggressively" cut costs. On July 17, Athena Georgaklis departed Nelvana, and the studio halted its development slate for the rest of the year. On August 14, Corus closed another AM station, Hamilton's CHML.

That month, Corus filed a complaint against Rogers with the CRTC, alleging abuse of a dominant position. The company cited Rogers' undue preference of foreign streaming service Disney+ over Corus' licensed Disney Branded Television specialty services, including offering plans for its ad-supported version (whose Canadian advertising sales are handled by Rogers) bundled with television subscriptions, and giving Disney+ greater prominence on the program guide and search tools of its Ignite TV platform. It also alleged that the CRTC had done little to enforce monitoring provisions on Rogers' dealings with independent broadcasters following the Shaw acquisition. Rogers dismissed the accusations, alleging that Corus had failed to adapt its "broken business model" to changes in viewing habits, and citing the declining viewership and Canadian content investments into the services.

Corus began to transition Food Network, HGTV, and Slice to alternate foreign programming sources in the 2024–25 season, with Slice beginning to include more We TV and true crime programs. On September 18, 2024, Corus announced that Food Network and HGTV would rebrand as Flavour Network and Home Network respectively on December 30. The schedules of both channels would rely primarily on new and existing Canadian productions, and new acquisitions. Some repeats of Food Network and HGTV series would continue airing on the rebranded channels for a period. Reeb stated that he considered the two channels' original productions to have historically been their main draws, and felt the new, in-house brands would provide Corus with more flexibility to "go more unique" with their programming and be "a little younger, a little fresher, a little more diverse than what people have traditionally been used to on those lifestyle services".

On September 16, 2024, citing internal sources familiar with the situation, The Globe and Mail reported that Quebecor had been pursuing an acquisition of Corus. Representatives of the company had met with Corus executive Heather Shaw earlier in the year, and Quebecor had reportedly sent an offer to the company several weeks prior, but had not yet received a response. Corus and Quebecor declined to comment. On September 29, amid an approaching deadline for a debt relief agreement, it was further reported that Quebecor had asked Corus' lenders to write down at least 60% of its debt in a restructuring that would enable a potential acquisition. However, it was reported that analysts were bullish on the proposed offer due to the instability of the television industry.

On October 25, 2024, Corus reported a 21% year-over-year decrease in revenue (approximately $26 million) in the fourth fiscal quarter of 2024, and a 16% year-over-year decrease in annual consolidated earnings over 2023. Gossling cited the 2023 Hollywood labour disputes, and an oversupply of digital advertising inventory caused by the growth of competing ad-supported streaming services, and modest growth in its own streaming services. He stated that Corus planned to "[fight] back against the continued encroachment of U.S. tech giants into the Canadian advertising market" by focusing on "the value of our content, of our communities and of our people." It was also announced that Corus had renegotiated its credit agreements with RBC Capital Markets and TD Securities, increasing its maximum cash flow-to-debt ratio through March 2025. On November 1, 2024, Bloomberg News reported that Corus had hired Jefferies Group to explore a potential sale. In November 2024, Corus Radio underwent a round of layoffs across its news/talk stations, impacting on-air talent in multiple markets; a new syndicated programme, The Ben Mulroney Show, premiered across the stations shortly afterward.

On April 17, 2025, the company announced that Heather Shaw, who had been with the company since its inception, would retire as an executive chair effective May 31; she would remain a non-executive chair.

On July 10, 2025, it was reported that Corus would be closing Disney Jr., Disney XD, ABC Spark, La Chaîne Disney, and Nickelodeon on September 1, 2025, as a cost-cutting measure. A Corus spokesperson confirmed the closures to industry publication Cartt, stating that the decision was made as part of a "comprehensive review" of its operations to "[meet] the evolving needs of our audiences and distribution partners". While this resulted in the closure of most Disney Branded Television channels licensed by Corus, Disney Channel, as well as the company's other kids and family networks, including YTV and Treehouse, remain in operation. On September 1, 2025, Corus also announced that production would be halted at Nelvana for the time being until further notice, stating that it would "focus on managing existing properties".

=== Continued re-organization and shift to streaming ===
In November 2025, Corus announced a deal with its creditors, led by Canso Investment Counsel, whereby a new parent company would take control of Corus, with 99% of shares owned by these creditors, and 1% of shares allocated to previous Corus shareholders (including the Shaw family). The CRTC approved the plan on September 17, 2026, and the reorganization was completed on October 8 of that year, with shares of the new parent company, named Corus Entertainment Holdings Inc., set to begin trading on October 13.

On April 30, 2026, Corus launched Vivéo, a French-language subscription service similar to StackTV. On September 23, 2026, Corus announced that its video subscription service StackTV would expand into an streaming app for mobile devices later that year, with the Global app becoming the StackTV app.

== Relationship with Shaw Communications ==
Corus Entertainment was formed from the media assets that had been owned by Shaw Communications in the years before. From 1999 to early 2023, Shaw and Corus operated as independent, publicly traded companies; nonetheless, they had a common majority shareholder in the Shaw family, and some reports indicated that the two companies continued to have a close relationship. For several years, Corus managed advertising operations (such as TV listings channels) for Shaw's cable systems, although this operation has since been discontinued. Executives have also occasionally moved between the two companies, with former Corus Television president Paul Robertson joining Shaw to head Shaw Media (the former Canwest broadcasting operations) in 2010.

Following Shaw's 2010 acquisition of Canwest's TV assets, the two companies incidentally became partners in certain channels including Dusk (later replaced by ABC Spark) and the Canadian version of Food Network; these two partnerships were discontinued in April 2013. Otherwise, there was no connection or common programming between Corus' conventional and specialty television operations and those of Shaw Media. For example, Corus owns three over-the-air television stations which were long-time CBC affiliates, and which agreed in 2015 to switch to Bell Media's CTV network, despite Shaw owning the rival Global network at the time. Following the merger of the Shaw Media properties into Corus, the Corus-operated CTV affiliates began transitioning to Global programming in September 2016 (beginning with CTV News programming being discontinued in favour of Global News), and eventually switching to Global full-time after their affiliation expired on August 27, 2018. Shaw also continued to direct a portion of its CRTC-mandated local expression funding to Corus-owned Global stations following the transfer of Shaw Media, amounting to approximately $13 million per year.

As Corus Entertainment and Shaw Communications were both effectively controlled by JR Shaw, the CRTC considered them to be one entity regarding the "Diversity of Voices" policy, and a vertical integration rule which requires television providers to carry three channels owned by unaffiliated parties for each co-owned channel they offer: due to the effective control, Corus networks that are carried by Shaw television services were subject to this rule.

With the 2023 sale of Shaw Communications to Rogers, there are no longer any meaningful ties between the two companies: Rogers does not hold any shares or board representation in Corus, and Corus affirmed that it would operate as an independent programmer. As a condition of the sale, Rogers agreed to conditions mandating that it not act as a single entity with Corus, "deprive, directly or indirectly, other BDUs or industry participants of Corus's content", or give Corus due advantages in its dealings with the company or vice versa. Rogers withdrew the community television expenditures that had been previously allocated to Corus' Global stations, and moved them to its own Citytv stations.

== Sponsorships and industry partnerships ==
Corus is an industry sponsor of the University of Waterloo Stratford Campus; Gary Maavara, Corus' Corporate Secretary, sits on the Waterloo campus' advisory board. The company also funds a couple of endowed chair positions, including chair in Women in Management at the Ivey Business School in London, Ontario, Canada beginning in 2003, and a chair in Communications Strategy at the Rotman School of Management in Toronto beginning in 2002.

== See also ==
- Corus Radio
- List of assets owned by Corus Entertainment
- List of Canadian television channels
- List of Canadian specialty channels
