= Multicultural media in Canada =

Multicultural media in Canada, also referred to as “ethnic media” or “third media” (as it may use languages other than Canada's two official languages, French and English), is media that responds to the needs of ethnic minorities of Canada. The objective of such media in Canada is to create a voice for a community of a particular ethnic background, challenge social injustices, and foster cultural pride for minority and immigrant Canadians.

Multicultural media does not always target new immigrants, though much of this particular media works to eliminate feelings of isolation in the dominant culture. Multicultural media also services Canadian-born individuals of a visible minority as well as diasporic ethnicities. Ultimately, multicultural media in Canada, whether it is delivered in English, French or the respective language of the culture, is to contribute to the cultural maintenance and ethnic cohesion of the culture in question but also help members of minorities to integrate into larger Canadian society. The third-language media are especially important for new immigrants, as they are usually the main source of information for those who have yet to become proficient in one of the official languages. Thus, third-language media provide crucial information on education, training, and job seeking for these immigrants.

Today, multicultural media is available across Canada from small newspapers to full-fledged broadcasting stations run by the private sector, such as OMNI TV.

== History ==
The promotion of multicultural media began in the late 1980s as multicultural policy was legislated in 1988. In the Multiculturalism Act, the federal government proclaimed the recognition of the diversity of Canadian culture. Thus, multicultural media became an integral part of Canadian media overall. Upon numerous government reports showing lack of minority representation or minority misrepresentation, the Canadian government stressed separate provision be made to allow minorities and ethnicities of Canada to have their own voice in the media.

Today, multicultural media is available across Canada from small newspapers to full-fledged broadcasting stations run by the private sector, such as OMNI TV. Due to the difficulty of acquiring licensing and space on the electromagnetic spectrum due to costs and threshold of the spectrum itself, many ethnic cultures in Canada have third-language channels through satellite television. However, this still creates exclusion of minorities from mass media as found in Canadian Radio-television and Telecommunications Commission's review of the 1999 Ethnic Broadcasting Policy found technological access and financial constraints hindered many ethnic minorities from accessing specialty television.

== Policy and legislation ==
In 1971, Canada became the first country to introduce a Multiculturalism policy. By 1988, the policy became an act of Parliament known as the Multiculturalism Act. The act proclaimed the federal government's policy to recognize the diversity of cultures in Canadian society. It also provided the overall framework for management of ethnocultural and racial diversity in Canada. Similarly the Broadcasting Act of 1991 asserts that the Canadian broadcasting system should reflect the diversity of cultures in the country.

The CRTC is the governmental body which enforces the Broadcasting Act. The CRTC revised their Ethnic Broadcasting Policy in 1999 to go into the details on the conditions of the distribution of ethnic and multilingual programming. One of the conditions that this revision specified was the amount of ethnic programming needed in order to be awarded the ethnic broadcasting licence. According to the act, 60% of programming on a channel, whether on the radio or television, has to be considered ethnic in order to be approved for the licence under this policy. However, this quota does not specify which language this programming be in thus not considering the needs of the ethnic audiences.

== Print media ==
=== Newspaper ===
There are hundreds of ethnic newspapers available throughout the country. These papers have become increasingly more high-level in both the way they are run and the stories they cover. The larger dailies are the Chinese-language Ming Pao and Sing Tao Daily, and the Italian-language Corriere Canadese.

Some other notable papers are Ghanaian News, a monthly newspaper that focuses on news relating to Ghanaian immigrants now living in Toronto or Montreal, the cities the paper is distributed in. Its contents mainly pertain to news from Ghana as well as news on Ghanaian Canadians. Mostly Ghanaian News stresses cultural retention and investing back into the home country.

The Montreal Community Contact is another minority paper serving the black community in Montreal. Founded in 1992 by Egbert Gaye, the Montreal Community Contact contains stories pertaining to all black Canadians regardless of country of origin (unlike Ghanaian News). Ninety per cent of the paper is devoted to issues confronting foreign and Canadian-born black people in Montreal. The paper also reports stories on small business started by members of the black community as well as successful black Canadians. While the paper tries to promote a positive image of the black community, it does also report on conflict and crime within the community it serves.

Ethnic newspapers in Canada
Newspaper	Demographic	Location	Language(s)
Afghan Post	Afghan	Toronto	
Abaka	Armenian	Montreal	Armenian, French, English
Horizon Weekly	Armenian	Montreal	Armenian, French, English
Asian Pacific Post	Asian	Vancouver	
International Dhaka Post	Bengali	Montreal	Bengali, English
Forum Bulgare	Bulgarian	Montreal	Bulgarian
Share	Caribbean	Toronto	
Toronto Caribbean Newspaper	Caribbean	Toronto	
Asian Pacific Post	Chinese	Vancouver	
Canadian Chinese Times	Chinese	Calgary	
Les Presses Chinoises	Chinese	Montreal	Chinese
Manitoba China Times	Chinese	Winnipeg	
Manitoba Chinese Tribune	Chinese	Winnipeg	
Manitoba Indochina Chinese News	Chinese	Winnipeg	
Ming Pao Daily News	Chinese	Toronto	Chinese
Oriental Weekly	Chinese	Calgary	Chinese
Sept Days	Chinese	Montreal	Chinese
Sing Tao Daily	Chinese	Toronto (HQ); Calgary; Vancouver	
Trend Weekly	Chinese	Calgary	Chinese
Maandblad de Krant	Dutch	Oakville, ON	Dutch
The Filipino Post	Filipino	Vancouver	
Ang Peryodiko	Filipino	Winnipeg	
Balita	Filipino	Toronto	
The Filipino Journal	Filipino	Winnipeg	
The Philippine Reporter	Filipino	Toronto	
The Philippine Times	Filipino	Winnipeg	
Kanadan Sanomat	Finnish	Toronto	Finnish
La Liberté	Francophone	Winnipeg	French
Das Echo	German	Montreal	German
Ghanaian News	Ghanaian	Toronto and Montreal	
Calgary Jewish News	Jewish	Calgary	
Canadian Jewish News	Jewish	Toronto	English
The Jewish Post & News	Jewish	Winnipeg	
Lögberg-Heimskringla	Icelandic	Winnipeg	Icelandic
Nunatsiaq News	Indigenous	Iqaluit	
Turtle Island News	Indigenous	Ohsweken, ON	
Two Row Times	Indigenous	Hagersville, ON	
Salam Toronto	Iranian	Toronto	English, Persian
Shahrvand	Iranian	Vancouver	Persian
Corriere Italiano	Italian	Montreal	Italian
Il Cittadino Canadese	Italian	Montreal	Italian
Corriere Canadese	Italian	Toronto	Italian
Latin America Connexions	Latin-American	Vancouver	
Milénio Stadium	Portuguese	Toronto	Portuguese, English
O Mundial	Portuguese	Winnipeg	Portuguese
Jornal Brasil Vancouver	Brazilian	Vancouver	Portuguese
Ukrainian Voice	Ukrainian	Winnipeg	
Visnyk Newspaper	Ukrainian	Winnipeg	
Hala Canada Media	Arabic	Ontario	Arabic

Defunct newspapers:

- The Canadian Western Jewish Times
- Canadan Sanomat (Finnish)
- Canadian Jewish Review
- De Nederlandse Courant (Dutch)
- The Jewish Star
- The Jewish Tribune
- Keneder Adler (Jewish; Yiddish-language)
- The New Republic (Chinese)
- Tai Hon Kong Bo (Chinese)
- Today Daily News (Chinese)
- Vapaa Sana (Finnish)
- Vapaus (Finnish)
- Vochenblatt (Jewish; Yiddish-language)
- Voice of the Fugitive (Black)
- The Windmill Herald (Dutch)
- World Journal (Chinese)
- Hala Canada Magazine (Arabic)

=== Periodicals ===
Newspaper	Demographic	Location	Language(s)
Aboriginal Voices (defunct)	Indigenous	Toronto	
Dutch, the magazine	Dutch		
The Eastern Door	Indigenous	Kahnawake, QC	
Inuktitut	Indigenous (Inuit)		Inuktitut (syllabics), Inuinnaqtun, English, and French.
Iskra	Doukhobors	Grand Forks, BC	English and Russian
Luso Life	Portuguese	Toronto	English
Mehfil Magazine (defunct)	South Asian		
Muskrat Magazine	Indigenous	Toronto	
Mwinda	Afro-Caribbean		
Nunatsiaq News	Indigenous (Inuit)	Iqaluit, NU	Inuktitut and English
Outlook (defunct)	Jewish		
Paaras	Pakistani	Mississauga, ON	English and Urdu
Phoenicia (defunct)	Lebanese / Arab		
Pilipino Express	Filipino	Winnipeg	Filipino
Reorient (defunct)	Middle-Eastern		
Revista Amar	Portuguese	Toronto	Portuguese
Russian Canadian Info	Russian		Russian
SAY Magazine	Indigenous	Winnipeg	
Windspeaker	Indigenous	Edmonton	
Hala Canada Media	Arabic	Toronto	Arabic

=== Issues ===
The need for ethnic newspapers is high as the representation of ethnic minorities is low in mainstream Canadian newspapers. The newsgathering staffs of 37 newspapers from across the 10 Canadian provinces only have 3.4% non-white individuals. In fact, 22 out the 37 newspapers have an all white staff. With no diversity in ethnicities the stories being presented through the mainstream papers do not present issues of interest to minorities or present an accurate picture of minority culture to the mainstream audience. This is in part due to the lack of structure in funneling minorities into the reporting and editing sphere, a structure that is present in the United States. As such the black community in Montreal, for example, receive limited coverage in mainstream papers. This coverage is usually around “black” events such as Black History Month in February or during summer for Nuit D’afrique and Carifestival. This “calendar journalism” presents a very limited view of these communities and only further removes them from being included in to mainstream discourse as this coverage further perpetuates otherness. If the black community does get coverage in the mainstream English papers of Montreal, it is to highlight a black athletes success at a sporting event, or to highlight a violent crime. This only further perpetuates stereotypes of the black community both good and bad. The reductionist coverage of black individuals in the cities mainstream print publications is undoubtedly related to the lack of diversity in the newsrooms. Ultimately the Multicultural Policy, which was created to avoid this under and misrepresentation, does not address the racism that causes these structural inequalities in the media.

Thus the Montreal Community Contact has not changed the mainstream coverage of the black community in their city. Once one looks at the numbers, this is not hard to understand. Despite the 159,000 black people in Montreal in 2001, the Contact only had a circulation of less than 8,000 papers. Only 7% of the community read the paper that year. Furthermore, there is limited mainstream access to the paper. The Montreal Community Contact is distributed by being left at ethnic stores or black community centres. This is a common distribution strategy for many ethnic newspapers in Canada. This is problematic as by making the paper only available to the ethnic audiences, little impact is made in changing the image of minorities to the mainstream population. Furthermore, the papers cannot impact the community’s image of itself as it is not accessible to all members of the community.

== Radio ==
In most major Canadian cities, ethnic radio is available. Whether it is an ethnic designated time slot on a commercial station, on community or campus radio, or a 24-hour multilingual operation, ethnic radio is accessible.

An example of the latter is CHIN radio. Created by Johnny Lombardi in 1966, CHIN radio has become the largest multicultural and multilingual radio station in Ontario. The station is delivers programming in more than 30 languages to 30 different cultural communities in southern Ontario and the Greater Toronto Area. Having branched out to the Ottawa and Gatineau region, CHIN also delivers programming in 18 languages there as well. The success of the station can be credited to CHIN’s method of providing quantitative research about their audiences to advertisers. Using custom studies and current demographic records provides CHIN the accurate numbers behind their audiences, making advertisers support the ethnic broadcaster. Due to the success of CHIN, many companies have begun to specialize in ethnocentric demographic and lifestyle data to help predict not only the media preferences of ethnic audiences but also their spending habits. No longer merely relying on Statistics Canada for information on minorities in the nation gives a more of a well-rounded look at the complexities of Canadians of various cultural backgrounds.

Recently, CHIN Radio has been reaching out to the official language speaking audiences. This includes the children of immigrants who grew up with English and French as their dominant language but want to learn more about their heritages traditional music, cuisine, and fashion. To reach to this segment of the population, CHIN has added a few English shows to their airwaves. CHIN also holds the popular CHIN Picnic every year to further attract non-ethnic listeners.

Multicultural and ethnic radio stations in Canada:

- ATN-Asian Radio
- CJCN-FM
- CFMB
- CFMS-FM
- CHHA (AM)
- CHHU-FM
- CHIN (AM)
- CHIN-FM
- CHKF-FM
- CHKG-FM
- CHKT
- CHLO (AM)
- CHMB
- CHOU (AM)
- CHPD-FM
- CHRN
- CHTO
- CIAM-FM
- CILO-FM
- CINA (AM)
- CINA-FM
- CIRF
- CIRV-FM
- CISK-FM
- CJLL-FM
- CJMR
- CJRJ
- CJRK-FM
- CJSA-FM
- CJVB
- CJVF-FM
- CJWI
- CKDG-FM
- CKER-FM
- CKFG-FM
- CKIN-FM
- CKJS
- CKYE-FM
- CKYR-FM
- Radio Humsafar
- Radio Pakistan Toronto
- WTOR
- Hala Canada Radio

== Television ==
The role of ethnic television media is to provide informational programming, which pertains to the needs of the various cultural communities within Canada. The information provided by these programs gives these communities information that the mainstream media does not provide.

Omni Television provides ethnic programming to cities in Ontario, British Columbia and Alberta. Their programming is mostly produced in Canada with a few shows from the various diasporas. The television system's three stations are offered on basic cable and show 60% or more of their programming in 40 languages to 50 ethnocultural communities. Knowing the importance of appealing not only to recent immigrants but also to the second and third generation immigrants, Omni, along with the other Canadian ethnic television stations, have started to raise the quality of programming.

CJNT-DT is a multicultural broadcast television station in Montreal whose roots are traced back to a public-access ethnic cable channel that launched in the 1980s called Télévision Ethnique du Québec (TEQ). The station broadcasts approximately 60% of its programming in seven languages. The station has the distinction of being the only multicultural television station to be affiliated with an English-language television system as it served as an affiliate of CH (later E!) from 2001 to 2009 under the ownership of Canwest; as a CH/E! affiliate, the station aired select programming from the system in varied languages such as Spanish, Portuguese and Italian, in order to partially fulfill its language requirements. In May 2012, Rogers Media announced the purchase of CJNT from Channel Zero, with the intent to affiliate the station with its primary television system Citytv rather than affiliate the station with Omni Television.

Another Canadian ethnic television service is specialty cable channel Telelatino. Serving Italian and Spanish Canadian audiences, the station is available in 3.5 million Canadian homes on the second tier. Telelatino is also committed to reaching out to a bigger audience outside of first generation immigrants. It has tried to grab a larger audience by introducing third-language programming in English as well as dubbing a second audio in English over its third-language programming. As it is majority owned by Corus Entertainment, TLN also shows children shows from YTV and Treehouse TV dubbed in Spanish. The audiences of ethnic stations are large enough to matter to advertisers, and this was made evident in the case of Italian-Australian comic Joe Avati's local Canadian tour. With TLN's promotion of the tour, Avati sold out 1800 seats for $50 each in 15 minutes. With this success due in part to TLN’s promotion, Avati expanded his tour by seven more shows in southern Ontario and Montréal. TLN subsidizes their 60% third-language shows by showing 40% English programming. Many ethnic broadcasters use this 60/40 model.

Multicultural and ethnic television in Canada
Name	Demographic	Language	Type
All TV	Korean	Korean	specialty channel
All TV K	Korean	Korean	specialty channel
CCCTV	Chinese	Chinese	specialty channel
CJNT-DT	various		station (broadcast)
Commonwealth Broadcasting Network			specialty channel
ERT World	Greek	Greek	specialty channel
Fairchild TV	Chinese	Cantonese	specialty channel
Fairchild TV 2 HD	Chinese	Cantonese	specialty channel
FEVA TV	Black/African	English	specialty channel
Filipino TV	Filipino	Tagalog	specialty channel
Follow Me TV	various		community channel
FPTV	Portuguese	Portuguese	specialty channel
Golive TV	various	Multilingual	station (IPTV)
Iran TV Network (defunct)	Iranian	Persian	specialty channel
Leonardo World (defunct)	Italian	Italian	specialty channel
LS Times TV	Chinese		
Telelatino	Italian, Latin American	English	specialty channel
Hala Canada Channel	Arabic	Arabic	online channel

=== Issues ===
One of the problems ethic television station face is the lack of both qualitative and quantitative research information about their audiences. Audience measurement numbers such as the A.C. Nielson and BBM do not have the metrics to provide accurate tracking of ethnic audiences. This problem led to OMNI’s collaboration with Manifold Data Mining to provide the numbers to verify the Chinese and South Asian markets purchasing power to advertisers. However, other channels that wish to corroborate their ethnic audience numbers do not have such tools thus severely affecting their funding from advertisers.

Another issue, which affects the ethnic broadcasters, is the way their audiences have come to see their news coverage. In Minelle Mahtani’s article “Racializing the Audience: Immigrant Perceptions of Mainstream Canadian English-Language TV News”, Mahtani found that ethnic audiences are unconvinced of the TV news channels geared towards minorities. In a focus group of Iranian immigrants conducted in Vancouver one participant stated “If I’m really looking for information I will turn to CBC…if I want serious information I wouldn’t watch Channel M.” Other participants of the focus groups deemed ethnic channels as “fluffy” or not providing information relevant to them. What is more is, these participants felt that multicultural media did not represent their lives in a less reductionist manner than mainstream media. Thus the audiences of multicultural media still do not feel their cultures’ complexities are represented accurately or at all. The ethnic broadcasts that focused on cultural events did not serve their needs and the ethnic audiences wanted more “inclusive and representative storytelling”. The ethnic television stations lack of legitimacy in mainstream realm further affects the minorities’ view of them. By tackling this issue of legitimacy, the ethnic broadcasters will not only help their image to mainstream audiences but also to their target audiences.

==== Grey Market Satellite Systems ====
Recently, Canada has seen the advance of the “Grey market satellite system”. These are subscription based TV services not owned by Canadian companies but have subscribers in Canada. In September 2002 the President of the Canadian Cable Televisions Association estimated as many as 700,000 illegal satellites were in Canada. Most of these dishes are not purchased from Canadian companies. This revenue could have gone to licensed Canadian companies such as Bell ExpressVu or Rogers Digital Cable. Immigrants who want and need programs and stations from their native home countries purchase many of these dishes. The figures point to a need for an expansion of third-language media as well as a lack of satisfaction of existing third-language media in Canada. Despite the need to grow third-language media further, in 2003 the government rejected adding more foreign-language broadcasters. In the same year, the CRTC stated in a report “Canadians enjoy access to a wide variety of ethnic services”. This statement was extremely problematic as at that time, though there were 93 foreign-owned channels licensed for broadcasting in Canada but only 10 were in languages other than English or French. Also, though most third-language broadcasters are approved by the CRTC they do not have carriers, making them inaccessible to Canadians. Furthermore, in the 14 largest TV markets, only 4 analogue specialty services were available which only catered to Italian, Spanish, Cantonese, South Asian and Greek communities. With the limited numbers of ethnic programming provided by the legal means, the immigrant and ethnic communities’ reliance on “illegal” satellite services only grows.

In February 2004 there was an attempt to amend the Radiocommunication Act to increase the penalty for transmitting or decoding unauthorized satellite signal. As the CRTC refused to add more third-language channels to the existing cable and satellite services, many saw this amendment as a direct attack on the minorities whose needs were not being met by the framework set in place. The amendment did not go through as it was seen as an attack on cultural diversity.

By mid-2004, the CRTC allowed access to more third-language channels but only to subscribers who already paid for ethnic channels based in Canada.

==== Al Jazeera ====
Al Jazeera English was approved for broadcasting in Canada by the CRTC in 2004. There was support for the station by the Muslim and Arabic communities in Canada. However, the Canadian Jewish Congress was less than enthusiastic about the networks availability in Canada. They stated “Under the guise of a seemingly legitimate news agency, Al Jazeera has provided hatemongers and terrorists with a platform for their view.” Ultimately, many in the Jewish communities found the station allowed and promoted anti-Semitic sentiments. The CRTC eventually concluded that though Al Jazeera had not promoted any such hateful views yet, it could potentially. This finding is extremely problematic as it gives any community or lobbyist the power to influence what channels are and are not approved by the CRTC. Any station can potentially promote hateful or spiteful messages. To allow any segment of the population to influence the CRTC’s decision on an ethnic channel can keep any third-language station off of Canadian airwaves legally. In the case of Al Jazeera, the CRTC made it the responsibility of the cable and satellite distributors to alter or delete any “abusive comments” made on Al Jazeera programming. The censorship power is otherwise forbidden to distributors. The authorization of this censorship can be seen as an act of racism on behalf of the CRTC as they only granted this censorship authority for this Arabic station. This marked the Arabic message as a deviant and ultimately uncanadian message, further perpetuating a growing Muslimphobia in the post 9/11 landscape. Furthermore, by passing the responsibility of censorship to distributors, the CRTC ensured the network would not receive carriage by the Canadian cable and satellite distributors. As Shaw Communications President Peter Bissonette explained by taking the responsibility which came with Al Jazeera, meant having a human monitoring the channel for 24 hours, who was fluent in Arabic, and knew contemporary broadcasting standards. Due to this demand in human and technological services, Al Jazeera is still not viewed on television in Canadian homes legally.

== Multicultural and ethnic media organizations ==
- Aboriginal Multi-Media Society (AMMSA)
- Aboriginal Peoples Television Network (APTN)
- Asian Television Network
  - Commonwealth Broadcasting Network
- Canadian Ethnic Media Association
- Native Communications
- U Multicultural

== See also ==
- Cultural mosaic
- Media of Canada
- Global Centre for Pluralism
- Multicultural art
- Academy of Canadian Cinema and Television Diversity Award
