= CJMT (AM) =

Former radio station in Chicoutimi, Quebec

CJMT was a radio station which operated at 1420 kHz on the AM band in Chicoutimi, Quebec, Canada.

== History ==
In 1953, the station's founder, J. O. Masse, submitted his initial application, for a 250-watt French-language AM station on 1450 kHz in Chicoutimi. However, the application was rejected by the Canadian Broadcasting Corporation, which at the time regulated all broadcasting in Canada. Later that year, Masse, along with his partners G. Demers and L. Lagace, each submitted its own application for a new station, each having suggested their own frequency. However, the CBC rejected all applications, but at a later meeting, the CBC granted Masse a license for the submitted parameters, while rejecting applications from the other parties.

The station signed on as CJMT on February 28, 1954, carrying no network programming.

In 1958, CJMT relocated its frequency from 1450 kHz to 1420 kHz and increased power from 250 watts to 1,000 watts, using a single directional antenna pattern for day and night operation.

CJMT later received approval to operate a standby transmitter.

Over the years, the station went through different formats, owners and technical upgrades.

On August 23, 1994, CJMT had its licence renewed from September 1, 1994 to August 31, 1996.

=== Closure ===
On September 30, 1994, Telemedia and Radiomutuel merged their AM operations because they could no longer afford to compete with each other. As a result, they closed CJMT, along with CJMS Montreal, CJRP Quebec City, CJRS Sherbrooke, CJTR Trois-Rivières and CKCH Hull. All six stations left the air on this date and the licenses were turned in to the CRTC, which revoked the licences on November 2, 1994.

In 2002, Rogers Media launched CJMT-TV in Toronto as part of the Omni Television brand, taking the call sign with them.
