= CJMS =

CJMS may refer to:

- CJMS (1040 AM), a defunct radio station formerly licensed to Saint-Constant, Quebec, Canada, which operated from 1999 to 2020
- CJMS (1280 AM), a defunct radio station formerly licensed to Montreal, Quebec, Canada, which operated from 1954 to 1994
