= CJRS (Sherbrooke, Quebec) =

Former radio station in Sherbrooke, Quebec, Canada

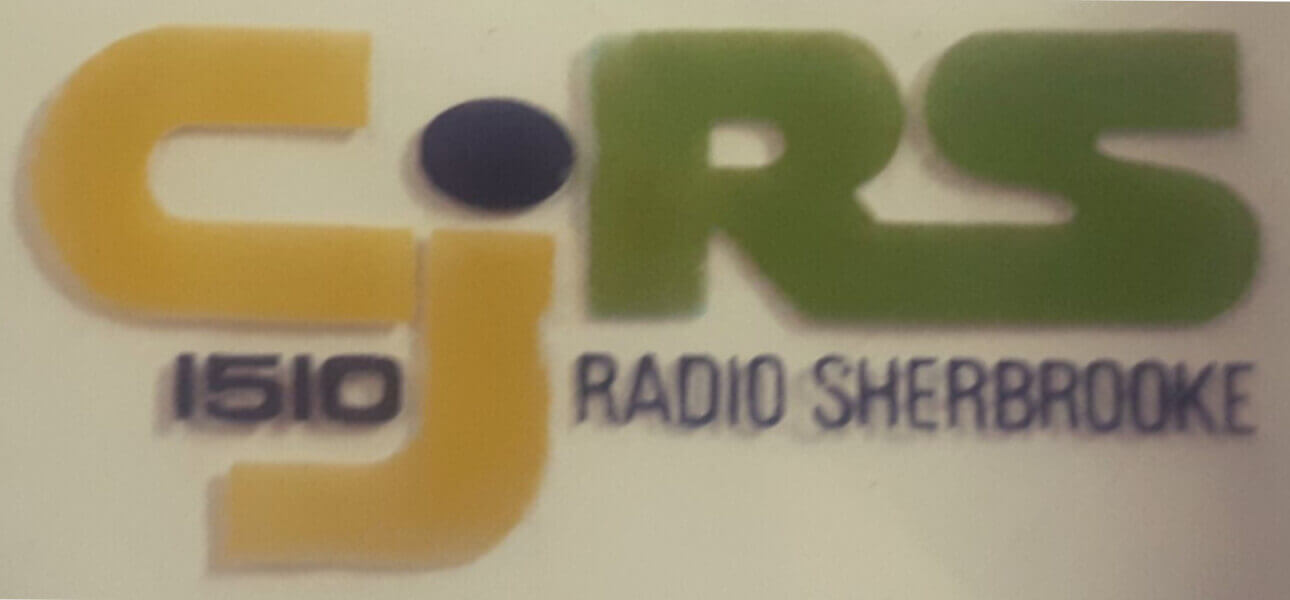
- Sherbrooke, Quebec; Canada
- Frequency: 1510 kHz

Programming
- Language: French

Ownership
- Owner: Radiomutuel

History
- First air date: 1965
- Last air date: September 30, 1994
- Call sign meaning: "Radio Sherbrooke"

Technical information
- Transmitter coordinates: 45.40°N 71.90°W

CJRS was a radio station which operated at 1510 kHz on the AM band in Sherbrooke, Quebec, Canada.

== History ==
The station was founded in 1965 by A. Raymond Crepault, owner of CJMS Montreal. CJRS (the "RS" stood for Radio Sherbrooke) commenced broadcasting in August 1967. Its broadcast parameters are currently unknown, though its coverage was restricted at night to protect Class-A clear-channel station WLAC in Nashville, Tennessee.

Over the years, the station went through different formats, owners and technical upgrades.

In 1991, CJRS applied to the CRTC for permission to discontinue local programming in favour of carrying only programming produced for the parent Radiomutuel network, or programs originating from CJMS through December 1992. In 1993, the CRTC approved an extension of this arrangement through August 31, 1995; however, as it no longer produced local programming, CJRS was banned from selling advertising in the Sherbrooke area.

=== Closure ===
On September 30, 1994, Telemedia and Radiomutuel merged their AM operations because they could no longer afford to compete with each other. As a result, they closed CJRS, along with CJMS Montreal, CJRP Quebec City, CJMT Chicoutimi, CJTR Trois-Rivieres and CKCH Hull. All six stations left the air on this date and the licences were turned in to the CRTC, which revoked the licences on November 2, 1994.

== See also ==
- CJMS (1280 AM)
