= CKCH =

Former radio station in Hull, Quebec, Canada

- Hull, Quebec; Canada
- Frequency: 970 kHz

Programming
- Language: French

Ownership
- Owner: Telemedia

History
- First air date: June 20, 1933
- Last air date: September 30, 1994
- Former frequencies: 1210 kHz (1933–1941); 1240 kHz (1941–1948)

Technical information
- Class: B
- Power: 250 watts

CKCH was a radio station which operated at 970 kHz on the AM band in Hull, Quebec, Canada from 1933 to 1994.

CKCH was also the original call sign of Ottawa radio station CNRO (later known as CBO) from February 27 to July 15, 1924

== History ==
On June 20, 1933, CKCH signed on the air, operating on 1210 kHz with 100 watts of power.

In 1941, under the Havana Treaty, CKCH moved from 1210 to 1240 kHz (Class IV) on March 29. Power remained 100 watts.

In 1947, CKCH was listed as operating on 1240 kHz with power of 250 watts, with an application pending for 1,000 watts on 970 kHz. It was a French language Radio-Canada affiliate and was owned by Compagnie de Radiodiffusion de Hull CKCH Limitée, the broadcasting arm of Ottawa's local newspaper, Le Droit. Studios were at 85 rue Champlain in downtown Hull, with the transmitter located at 620 Boulevard Saint-Joseph in the Parc-de-la-Montagne area of Hull. It was on the air 8:00 am to 11:00 pm. CKCH moved to its last frequency at 970 kHz in 1948.

Due to CKCH's modest power, Radio-Canada also relied on the 50,000-watt signal of Montreal's CBF to reach the National Capital Region's francophones until it signed on an Ottawa station of its own, CBOF.

Over the years, the station went through different formats, ownerships and technical upgrades.

In 1970, CKCH-FM (now CIMF-FM) was launched.

In 1984, CKCH's then-owner, Telemedia, received approval from the CRTC to renew its licence for another five-year period, from October 1, 1984 to September 30, 1989. CKCH's licence was renewed again in 1989, and one last time on August 23, 1994, for a two-year period from September 1, 1994 to August 31, 1996.

=== Closure ===
In 1994, the CRTC noted that CKCH had been having difficulty meeting the required level of 65% French vocals in its music content, but soon after, the station switched to an all-francophone format, in which all music played featured only French vocals.

On September 30, 1994, Telemedia and Radiomutuel merged their AM operations in Quebec, creating a new company, RadioMedia. But in doing so, the new combined company closed CKCH, along with CJMS, CJRP, CJMT, CJRS, and CJTR, as they felt it was not economical to continue operations of those stations. The merger was still subject to CRTC approval, but the two companies opted to close those six stations on this date and return licenses to the CRTC for cancellation. RadioMedia continued operations of their FM stations.

The CRTC officially revoked the licences for the six stations, including CKCH, on November 2, 1994.

== Notable staff ==
- Pierre Dufault, political correspondent and sports journalist
- François Gagnon news and court case correspondent

== See also ==
- CIMF-FM
