= CHHA =

CHHA may refer to:

- Certified Home Health Agency
- CHHA (AM), a radio station (1610 AM) licensed to Toronto, Ontario, Canada
