= CFAV =

CFAV may refer to:

- Canadian Forces Auxiliary Vessel, see List of current ships of the Royal Canadian Navy
- CJLV, a French-language Canadian radio station located in Laval, Quebec, near Montreal, Canada; from 2004 to 2010 it was called CFAV.
- Cadet Force Adult Volunteers, see Army Cadet Force
