= South Asian Post =

Canadian newspaper

The South Asian Post is a Canadian weekly newspaper published in Vancouver, British Columbia With a readership of 135,000 people, the newspaper targets the Indo-Canadian/Pakistani community in the city and province. The South Asian Post is a sister publication to The Asian Pacific Post, a weekly based in Vancouver.

In 2008, the South Asian Post won a Jack Webster Award for Best Community Reporting for the story "An Innocent Man".
