= CFCQ-FM =

Former radio station in Quebec, Canada

Coordinates: 46.361°N 72.521°W

CFCQ-FM was an educational radio station which operated on 93.9 MHz/FM in Trois-Rivières, Quebec, Canada. The station broadcast with an effective radiated power of 28,800 watts. Owned by Téléduc Inc., the actual sign-on date of CFCQ-FM is currently unknown.

== History ==
The station was licensed by the CRTC in 1976 to Louis Martel, representing a yet-to-be-named non-profit organization, with the intent to broadcast educational and informational programming, including college courses for credit, from area educational institutions. The station would be built by the Cégep de Trois-Rivières, and be financed by the sale of air time to the various educational organizations.

On January 11, 1984, the CRTC renewed CFCQ-FM's licence until September 30, 1985. However, the station went dark in August 1984, returning to the air on March 16, 1986.

On August 26, 1986, CFCQ-FM was not allowed by the CRTC to change the conditions of its license, because it would have become a more community-oriented station with less emphasis on educational programs. CFCQ would soon move its studios from Trois-Rivières to Cap-de-la-Madeleine without approval from the CRTC.

=== Forced closure ===
On March 20, 1987, the CRTC denied CFCQ-FM's renewal for various reasons, including having been dark for 18 months, failing to meet its licensing conditions (including not meeting music and spoken word quotas), and relocating its studios without CRTC authorisation. The renewal was also opposed by area stations CKSM, CHLN and CJTR, over accusations that CFCQ-FM was not meeting its license's conditions. The station was ordered to leave the air by March 31, 1987, the date its licence was to expire.

=== Aftermath ===
On August 16, 17 and 18, 1991, the 93.9 MHz frequency was temporarily used by L'Association du Sport Motorisé de Trois-Rivières Inc. to broadcast live coverage of the Trois-Rivières Grand Prix race with 10 watts of power.

The 93.9 MHz frequency has since been reassigned to CBMZ-FM, the local repeater of CBC Radio One outlet CBVE-FM in Quebec City, which went on the air in 2003.
