= CJTR (AM) =

Former radio station in Trois-Rivières, Quebec

CJTR was a radio station which operated at 1140 kHz on the AM band in Trois-Rivières, Quebec, Canada. The "TR" in the call sign stood for Trois-Rivières.

== History ==
CKTR originally began broadcasting on February 6, 1954, on a frequency of 1350 kHz with 1,000 watts of power (single day and night directional pattern).

In 1958, CKTR received approval to increase power from 1,000 watts full-time to 5,000 watts day and 1,000 watts at night, and to change frequency from 1350 (DA-1) to 1150 kHz (DA-2). According to a print ad, CKTR planned for this upgrade to take effect by October 15.

In 1968, the callsign was changed to CJTR. However, its licensee's name retained its old callsign, as "CKTR 1958 Ltd."

On March 28, 1969, CJTR was authorised to change its frequency from 1150 to 1140 kHz and its parameters from 10,000 / 1,000 watts DA-2 to 20,000 watts DA-2, using a new transmitter site. Its directional parameters were to protect Class-A clear-channel stations WRVA in Richmond, Virginia and XEMR-AM in Apodaca, Nuevo León, Mexico at night.

Over the years, the station went through different formats, owners and technical upgrades.

=== Closure ===
On September 30, 1994, Telemedia and Radiomutuel merged their AM operations because they could no longer afford to compete with each other. As a result, they closed CJTR, along with CJMS Montreal, CJRP Quebec City, CJMT Chicoutimi, CJRS Sherbrooke, and CKCH Hull. All six stations left the air on this date and the licenses were turned in to the CRTC, which revoked the licences on November 2, 1994.
