= Media of Canada =

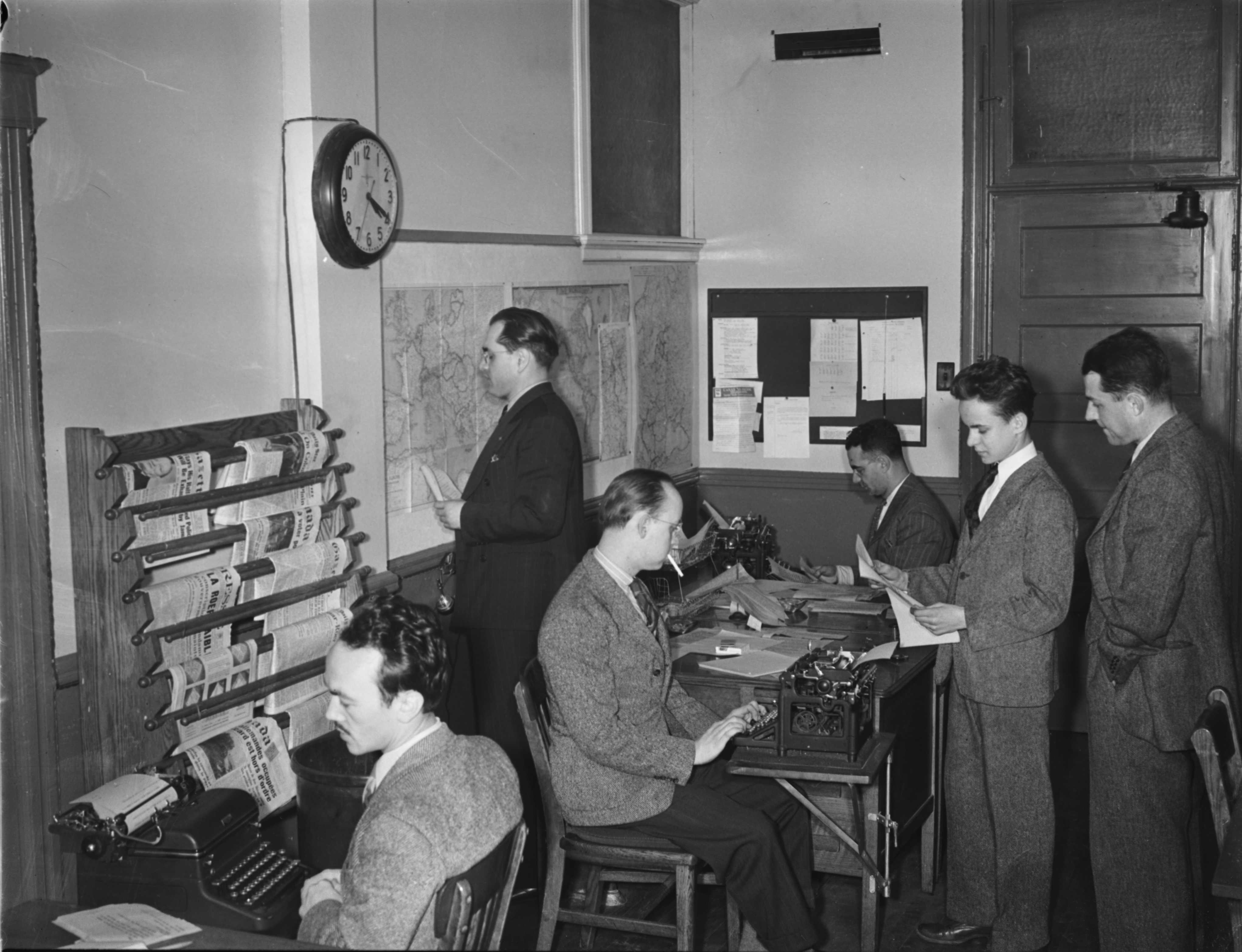
Journalists in a CBC newsroom in Montreal in November 1944

The media of Canada is highly autonomous, diverse, and very regionalized. Canada has a well-developed media sector, but its cultural output—particularly in English films, television shows, and magazines—is often overshadowed by imports from the United States and the United Kingdom. As a result, the preservation of a distinctly Canadian culture is supported by federal government programs, laws, and institutions such as the Canadian Broadcasting Corporation (CBC), the National Film Board of Canada (NFB), and the Canadian Radio-television and Telecommunications Commission (CRTC).

Canadian mass media, both print and digital, and in both official languages, is largely dominated by a "handful of corporations". The largest of these corporations is the country's national public broadcaster, the Canadian Broadcasting Corporation, which also plays a significant role in producing domestic cultural content, operating its own radio and TV networks in both English and French.

In addition to CBC/Radio-Canada, the provincial governments of British Columbia, Ontario, and Québec operate their own public broadcast services, which play an important role within their respective markets. These include Télé-Québec in Québec, the Knowledge Network Corporation in British Columbia, and TVO Media Education Group and Groupe Média TFO in Ontario.

The 1991 Broadcasting Act declares "the system should serve to safeguard, enrich, and strengthen the cultural, political, social, and economic fabric of Canada". The promotion of multicultural media began in the late 1980s as multicultural policy was legislated in 1988. In the Multiculturalism Act, the federal government proclaimed the recognition of the diversity of Canadian culture. Thus, multicultural media became an integral part of Canadian media overall. Upon numerous government reports showing lack of minority representation or minority misrepresentation, the Canadian government stressed separate provision be made to allow minorities and ethnicities of Canada to have their own voice in the media.

Non-news media content in Canada, including film and television, is influenced both by local creators as well as by imports from the United States, the United Kingdom, Australia, and France. In an effort to reduce the amount of foreign-made media, government interventions in television broadcasting can include both regulation of content and public financing. Canadian tax laws limit foreign competition in magazine advertising.

== Statistics ==
Media Consumption in Canada 2023

According to the 2025 Canadian Social Survey, Canadians most typically obtained news or information from news organizations(66%), close contacts (62%), social media platforms (54%) and television programming (52%). Canadians aged 15 to 24 were the least likely to rely on news organizations (49%), compared with over three in four Canadians aged 75 and over (78%). Racialized Canadians were more likely to obtain information from social media platforms (70%) and close contacts (63%) relative to other platforms.

In 2025, four in five Canadians (80%) saw news or information on the Internet that they suspected to be misleading, false or inaccurate on a regular basis. Canadians with an education above the high school level and those who were non-racialized and non-Indigenous had a greater likelihood of seeing misinformation at least monthly.Note11 Furthermore, people in Ontario, Alberta and British Columbia were more likely to see misinformation regularly. Conversely, Canadians aged 35 and over were less likely to see misinformation regularly. While people residing in Quebec (75%) and women (77%) were less likely to report regularly seeing misinformation Canadians are also finding it increasingly difficult to tell what is real from what is fabricate, with data showing that nearly half of Canadians (47%) reported that they were finding it harder to distinguish between true and false news or information.

== History ==
The history of Canadian media performers goes back to the first days of radio. In the 1940s, the Radio Artists of Toronto Society (RATS) was formed. Radio performers in Montreal, Winnipeg, and Vancouver also organized to fight for artists' rights, working conditions, and better fees. In 1943, the Association of Canadian Radio Artists (ACRA) was formed as a loose national coalition of actors' groups. Over the years, ACRA evolved into the Association of Canadian Radio and Television Artists, followed by the Canadian Council of Authors and Artists, then the Association of Canadian Television and Radio Artists, and, in 1984, to the Alliance of Canadian Cinema, Television and Radio Artists, its present name.

The Canadian Broadcasting Act, historically and in its modern conception, is based on the fact that, since the start of the 20th century, it was important for broadcasters to ensure that information flowed freely and reflected the diversity of Canadian points of view, as opposed to the classic approach, which gives media owners more freedom to express their views. The Canadian broadcasting system as it exists today "would probably not exist if we had allowed the marketplace to regulate ownership rights."

In August 2015, the Canadian Media Guild, the union representing CBC journalists, became a registered third party in order to campaign for increased taxpayer funding of the CBC in the 2015 election. After the Liberal Party of Canada won the election, it increased taxpayer funding of the CBC by CA$150 million. In 2017, the federal government announced a five-year $50-million program to help struggling local newspapers. In 2018, it announced $595 million in tax credits to help struggling newspapers and television networks adapt to competition from online news sources.

In 2013, Maclean's wrote an article noting the influence that Quebecor and owner Pierre Karl Péladeau have on the Quebec media system. The article noted that Quebecor behaves like a counterpart to the federalist La Presse, owned by the Desmarais family. In November 2018, Unifor, the other major union for Canadian journalists, announced that it would campaign against the Conservative Party of Canada in the 43rd Canadian federal election. In February 2019, former Attorney General Jody Wilson-Raybould gave testimony to the House of Commons Justice Committee raising further speculation of political interference from the Liberal Party in journalism. As part of the testimony, Jessica Prince, the Wilson-Raybould's chief of staff revealed that Katie Telford, chief of staff to Prime Minister Justin Trudeau, said: "If Jody is nervous, we would, of course, line up all kinds of people to write op-eds saying that what she is doing is proper."

Postmedia has faced questions from both Maclean's and Canadaland, regarding whether recent changes to their editorial staff was singling a shift that they were pushing "conservative views" onto their audience. In 2019, Kathy English, the public editor for the Toronto Star, admitted that The Star has failed to meet its journalistic standards by stating "call for reporting fairly and accurately and reflecting the pertinent facts and diversity of views on matters of public debate."

English defended The Star, arguing that there is "no such a thing as objectivity in journalism."

A report released from the Digital Democracy Project, a joint venture between the Public Policy Forum and McGill University's School of Public Policy revealed that non-partisans with high exposure to traditional media gave roughly 50% more wrong answers than those with low exposure. "Strong partisans", however, gave almost twice as many.

=== The Electronic Age and Marshall McLuhan ===
In The Gutenberg Galaxy, Marshall McLuhan writes that:

if a new technology extends one or more of our senses outside us into the social world, then new ratios among all of our senses will occur in that particular culture. It is comparable to what happens when a new note is added to a melody. And when the sense ratios alter in any culture then what had appeared lucid before may suddenly become opaque, and what had been vague or opaque will become translucent.

He gives great importance to the introduction of electronic media into the realm of people's everyday lives. According to McLuhan, the introduction of electronic media was one of the main media revolutions. He claims that technology evoked an emotional response from audiences although it technically had no moral bias. Technology in the electronic age shapes an individual's (as well as a society's) self-realization. In other words, McLuhan writes about three major revolutions in his various works and gives great importance to the electronic one. Electronic mass media clearly have a large impact on Canadian society and affect audiences in a variety of ways.

=== Print Media and Marshall McLuhan ===
According to McLuhan's dichotomies of hot and cool media, print media occupy mostly a visual space, rather than other senses such as that of hearing (which is involved in media like television). He writes that this makes print media a hot medium, as it provides the reader with complete involvement without considerable stimulus. Because print media are hot media, they involve relatively little interaction from users. McLuhan discussed three main media revolutions, one of them coming about with the invention of the printing press. He explained that with texts being mass-produced there was a new level of immediacy, accessibility, and a subsequent rise in literacy; in manuscript culture, access to texts was limited to a privileged few, whereas in print culture, literature increasingly became a commodity. For this reason, print media was revolutionary at the time. However, with the more recent electronic revolution, the importance of print began to decline, as discussed below.

== Regulation ==
The Canadian government regulates media ownership and the state of media through the Canadian Radio-television and Telecommunications Commission. Section 3(d)(iii) of the Canadian Broadcasting Act states that media organizations should reflect "equal rights, the linguistic duality and multicultural and multiracial nature of Canadian society and the special place of aboriginal peoples within that society."

Multicultural media in Canada, also referred to as “ethnic media” or “third media” (as it may use languages other than Canada's two official languages, French and English), is media that responds to the needs of ethnic minorities of Canada. The objective of such media in Canada is to create a voice for a community of a particular ethnic background, challenge social injustices, and foster cultural pride for minority and immigrant Canadians.

== Identity and mass media in the 1960s ==
According to John A. Irving, writing in 1969, mass media functioned differently in Canadian society because of a lack of collective identity. Irving stated that such cultural dualism meant that only some of the population responded to the mass media in English, while the other portion remained uninfluenced by English-based media. In terms of the proximity to the United States, he argued that "most of the difficulties that threaten the mass media in Canada are the direct outcome of American economic and cultural imperialism." Because of the United States' overwhelming influence on Canadian mass media, Canada was not able to form its own identity in the media, and English-speaking Canadians were little exposed to French-language culture.

Irving claimed that, in the 1960s, the most important problem facing Canada in terms of forming a genuine identity came from its close proximity to the United States. Over ninety percent of the periodicals displayed on newsstands which sold more than 10,000 copies a month were American.

Irving also suggested that geographical regionalism also posed a barrier to the growth of Canadian Identity. Because of the large distances between these regions, media could not spread throughout the whole country as effectively in the past. In the time of canoe transportation, this distance was a barrier to communication; with the age of the telegraph-railway, Canada finally began to edge towards becoming a proper, connected nation.

== Business model ==
Media often consists of a two-sided market model. In such cases, each side of the market is expected to provide a form of benefit to the other in return for the same. It is a mutual system of benefit in which there are two end-users or beneficiaries. A lot of times, mass media works in this way (in Canadian society as well as in any other). For example, television requires the viewer and advertisers to provide mutual network benefits. Printed books require the publisher and author to provide readers with quality work; in return, readers provide feedback and increase the popularity of the book through purchases. A newspaper's advertisers and readers mutually benefit from one another; readers provide business for advertisers while advertisers provide readers with information (since a significant portion of newspapers' funding comes from advertisers). The more successful a newspaper is, the better it gets at providing its readers with a well-rounded accumulation of news. All advertising-based media are two-sided markets. Bob Garfield explains that there are two issues with this model: widespread access to certain content has significantly lowered the amount that consumers are willing to spend on it; the audience becomes fragmented. The second issue is that the rise in available content has lowered the prices that advertisers are willing to pay in order to access a portion of the market.

Special attention must be paid to the importance of advertising, particularly in newspapers. Newspapers typically generate about 70 – 80 percent of their revenue from advertising, while the remainder comes from subscriptions and sales.

In August 2015, the Canadian Media Guild, the union representing CBC journalists, became a registered third party in order to campaign for increased taxpayer funding of the CBC in the 2015 election. After the Liberal Party of Canada won the election, it increased taxpayer funding of the CBC by $150 million. In 2017, the federal government announced a five-year $50 million program to help struggling local newspapers. In 2018, it announced $595 million in tax credits to help struggling newspapers and television networks.

=== Journalism model ===
The face of print journalism in Canada is undergoing change. Evening newspapers are no longer popular (one of the only surviving ones is tonight Newspaper), while morning newspapers (including the Toronto Star, The Globe and Mail, the National Post, and free newspapers such as Metro and 24) have survived and continued to bring in an audience. Before the 1970s, The Globe and Mail was one of the few surviving morning papers, while most popular newspapers were distributed in the evening in Toronto. Nowadays, most newspapers have joined The Globe and Mail and are published in the morning.

The newspaper industry in Canada (similar to the newspaper industry in other developed countries including the United States) is controlled by a small number of individual or corporate owners. This is referred to as concentrated ownership. Private or partially private ownership of competitive forms of news media helps to create a great amount of freedom of expression, according to Peter Desbarats. However, it may be argued that even these privately owned media outlets have their own agenda, and have therefore only contributed to a limited amount of freedom of expression. Robert A. Hackett discusses this, as well as the differences between publicly owned and privately owned media outlets. It may also be argued that publicly owned media contribute more to freedom of expression than privately owned media; Simeon Djankov, Caralee McLeish, Tatiana Nenova, and Andrei Schleifer, in a joint Harvard-World Bank study, discuss the advantages and disadvantages of publicly owned media outlets in relation to privately owned media outlets. They write that one of the first principles of media is that it is in the public interest, and it is therefore necessary to have outlets owned by the public. In this way, the public keeps a check on the agenda of publications. If there is too much of a bias, the owners (which in this case consists of the public) react and demand a change through various forms of feedback. In contrast, privately owned outlets only have a limited number of voices to give feedback, and these voices may have their own biased agendas. Two characteristics of electronic journalism in Canada set it apart from print journalism: firstly, broadcasting is a regulated industry (which is important to consider in relation to news sources such as radio and television). This means that in order to start a broadcast station, one must have a licence from the Canadian Radio and Telecommunications Commission. This regulated industry also affects news content because it is constantly being monitored by the agency. Secondly, many radio stations and television stations in Canada are publicly owned. Print journalism has almost always been conducted by private enterprise in Canada, and radio also started as a private enterprise which was subject to regulation by the state. It became a hybrid of private and public broadcasters.

== Television ==
The history of television in Canada begins in Montreal and Toronto, where the first television stations were started in 1952. The Canadian Broadcasting Corporation aired its first broadcast on September 6, 1952 from Montreal's station, CBFT. The program was bilingual. As mentioned by Irving, and supported by Arthur Siegel, modern media such as television and radio have become agents of denationalization because of the spillover of U.S. influence and fragmentation of media within Canada. Siegel implies that because of this, the state of television in Canada (i.e. whether it is healthy or dying) depends on the state of television in the United States.

Television was welcomed when it was first introduced into society. It brought about a change from communication which was previously limited to only audio. If one wanted to view something on a screen, one would have to visit the cinema; the television provided a way of sitting at home and having visual communication as well as entertainment. Nowadays, however, with the introduction of smartphones and the Internet, television is headed towards obsolescence according to Rabab Khan. He writes that because smartphones and computers allow one do what a television and radio combined allow, the need for the latter two media is declining. However, he writes that television allows for a shared experience which computers and smartphones do not allow. Henry Blodget also addresses this issue and claims that because revenue and profits of the television industry are still steadily coming in, people are in denial about its inevitable failure. He states that like the newspaper industry, television is beginning to migrate to the web and investing in digital platforms.

The Canadian television broadcasting industry is split between public and private ownership. Canada currently has 130 originating television stations, which broadcast on 1,456 transmitters across the country, on both the VHF and UHF bands.

In addition to the public Canadian Broadcasting Corporation/Société Radio-Canada, which operates both English (CBC Television) and French (Ici Radio-Canada Télé) television networks, there are five major private TV networks. CTV, Global, and Citytv broadcast in English, and are available throughout the country. TVA and Noovo (formerly 'V') broadcast in French and operate over-the-air in French-language markets (including Quebec and parts of Ontario and New Brunswick), although are also available across Canada via pay television. Most network stations are owned and operated by the networks themselves, although all networks have some affiliates with different ownership.

2022 Press Freedom Index Good situation Satisfactory situation Noticeable problems Difficult situation Very serious situation Not classified / No data

In addition, the Aboriginal Peoples Television Network (APTN), a service devoted mainly to programming of interest to the Indigenous peoples of Canada, is considered a network by the CRTC, although the network airs terrestrially only in the 3 Canadian territories, and must be carried by all television providers in the rest of Canada. There are, as well, a number of smaller television systems, such as CTV Two (a compliment to the main CTV network), and Omni Television—a group of Rogers-owned ethnic broadcasters.

Several provinces maintain provincial public broadcasting networks in addition to the CBC, including Télé-Québec, TVOntario, TFO, and Knowledge (British Columbia). Citytv Saskatchewan and CTV Two Alberta were formerly provincial public broadcasters (SCN and Access), but both have since been privatized and amalgamated into commercial networks operated by their current owners (Rogers and Bell). While both outlets devote a portion of their schedules to their networks' respective, advertising-supported entertainment programming, both networks are still required to adhere to an educational remit in the majority of their programming. Unlike in the United States, where a statewide public network is usually the state's primary PBS member station, the provincially owned public systems in Canada are independent of each other and have their own programming.

Only CBC/Radio-Canada, TVA and APTN are officially considered national networks by the CRTC, while V is a provincial network in Quebec. City, CTV and Global are legally considered "television services" even though they operate as networks for all practical purposes. As well, there are a few independent stations, including CFTU in Montreal, CJON in St. John's and CJIL in Lethbridge. However, most of these are not general entertainment stations like independent stations in the United States, but are instead specialty community channels or educational services. CJON is the only independent commercial station currently operating in Canada, although CJON sublicenses a mix of programming from Global, CTV and other sources rather than purchasing program rights independently.

TV station callsigns in Canada are usually made up of four letters, although two stations have three call letters (CKX in Brandon and CKY in Winnipeg) and some (primarily CBC-owned Radio-Canada stations) have five. The first call letter is always C, and callsigns of privately owned television stations start with the two-letter combinations of CF, CH, CI, CJ, or CK. The combinations CG, CY, CZ and several combinations beginning with V and X are also assigned to Canada, but to date no Canadian television station has ever been licensed to take a call sign within those ranges. There is no clear rule for the call letters of rebroadcasters—some are labelled by the call-letters of the originating station, followed by a number, while others have their own distinct call letters. Low-power repeater transmitters (LPRTs) have their own unique callsign format, which consists of the letters CH followed by four numbers. Some rebroadcast transmitters are licensed as semi-satellites, which are licensed to air separate commercials (and, on rarer occasions, a limited amount of distinct programming) targeted to their community of license.

CBC-owned stations use call letters beginning with the combination CB (through a special agreement with the government of Chile); private affiliates of the CBC use the same combinations as other private stations. The CBC has also sometimes directly acquired former private affiliate stations; these usually (although not always) retain their historic call sign rather than changing to a CB call. While Canadian TV stations are technically required to identify themselves over the air by their call letters, the rule is rarely enforced by the CRTC. As a result, most TV stations never use their call letters for any purpose other than official CRTC business, and instead brand under regional names such as CTV Northern Ontario or Global Regina. Even then, most network-owned stations may only use these brands for station identification and newscasts, and promote the majority of their programming under the network brand without any disambiguation.

Due to their proximity to American media markets, a number of Canadian cities and regions receive US broadcasters as part of their local media. This has required special dispensation for Canadian content for broadcasters in the Windsor, Ontario region (due to it falling within the Detroit media footprint), and there have also been cases of US-based broadcasters (KCND-TV of Pembina, North Dakota, now CKND-DT of Winnipeg; also KVOS-TV of Bellingham, Washington) targeting its programming and advertising at Canadian viewers.

Although all broadcast networks in Canada are required to produce and air some Canadian content, only the English and French networks of the CBC run predominantly Canadian-produced schedules, though, the English network does run some imported programming from the United Kingdom, most notably Coronation Street. The private networks, CTV, Global and Citytv, have all at times faced criticism over their level of commitment to producing and airing Canadian programming. The commercial networks often find it easier to purchase rights to hit American series than to invest in Canadian productions, which are often prohibitively costly for the comparatively small size of the Canadian market. The French-language networks traditionally have had less difficulty meeting their Canadian content obligations, as the language difference makes francophone audiences much more readily receptive to home-grown programming than to dubbed American imports.

Digital television is an emerging technology in Canada. Although some TV stations have begun broadcasting digital signals in addition to their regular VHF or UHF broadcasts, this is not yet as widespread as in the United States. Although most markets have digital channel assignments already in place, to date digital broadcasts have only launched in the largest metropolitan areas. Digital television sets are available in Canadian stores, but are not universally present in all Canadian homes.

Several broadcasters, including the CBC, have argued that there is no viable business case for a comprehensive digital conversion strategy in Canada. At CRTC hearings in 2007 on the future direction of regulatory policy for television, broadcasters proposed a number of strategies, including funding digital conversion by eliminating restrictions on the amount of advertising that television broadcasters are permitted to air, allowing terrestrial broadcasters to charge cable viewers a subscription fee similar to that already charged by cable specialty channels, permitting license fees similar to those which fund the BBC in the United Kingdom, or eliminating terrestrial television broadcasting entirely and moving to an exclusively cable-based distribution model.

In May 2007, the CRTC set August 31, 2011 as the deadline for digital conversion in Canada. This is approximately two years later than the cutoff date in the United States. The CRTC ultimately decided to relax restrictions on advertising as the funding mechanism. However, a CRTC statement issued in June 2008 indicated that as of that date, only 22 digital transmitters had been fully installed across the entire country, and expressed the regulator's concern that Canada's television broadcasters were not adequately preparing for the shift to digital broadcasting.

=== Cable television ===
Cable television is a very common method of television programming delivery in Canada. By 1997, already 77% of Canadian homes subscribed to a cable television service. Vancouver, with 93% of its homes connected to cable, had one of the highest cable connection rates in the world.

There are currently 739 licensed cable distributors in Canada. This significant decline from over 2,000 just a few years ago is attributable both to major cable companies acquiring smaller distributors and to a recent change in CRTC rules by which independent cable operators with fewer than 2,000 subscribers are no longer required to operate under full CRTC licences. (However, the CRTC does retain some regulatory authority over these operators. This is an exemption granted by the CRTC to previously licensed companies that continue to meet certain conditions, and does not mean that anybody can simply set up their own small cable company without CRTC approval.)

Major Canadian cable companies include Rogers, Shaw, Cogeco, Vidéotron and EastLink/Persona. Most Canadian cities are served by only one cable company per market; in the few cities that are served by more than one cable company, each company is restricted to a specific geographical division within the market. For instance, in Hamilton, Cogeco Cable, Rogers Cable and Source Cable are all licensed operators, but each has a monopoly in a specific area of the city.

However, two major companies offer direct broadcast satellite delivery as an alternative to cable: Bell Satellite TV, which is a division of BCE Inc., and Shaw Direct, which is a division of Shaw. Grey market DBS dishes can also be obtained from American services such as DirecTV and Dish Network, but as these are not licensed Canadian providers, stores that sell those packages—and users who buy them—are at risk of criminal charges.

In some remote communities in the Territories (Yukon, Northwest Territories, Nunavut), cable delivery is prohibitively costly. As such, similar services are offered through MMDS technology.

An English-language 'basic cable' package in Canada traditionally includes:

- CTV, CTV Two, Global, City – the major English-language Canadian commercial networks;
- CBC Television and Ici Radio-Canada Télé – the English- and French-language CBC networks;
- a provincial educational broadcast undertaking (e.g. TVO in Ontario), if available (not all provinces have one);
- a community channel, produced by the particular cable company, which usually includes public affairs and information programming as well as community events listings (cf. public-access television in the United States);
- APTN – a network devoted to Aboriginal programming;
- TVA – one of the two private French-language broadcasters in Quebec; (Note: The other French-language broadcaster in Quebec, Noovo, does not have mandatory national carriage rights, although some cable companies in Ontario and New Brunswick offer the network on a discretionary basis, and the network does have mandatory carriage in Quebec.)
- nearby independent channels or channels from smaller television systems such as Omni Television or Yes TV;
- CPAC – a channel that broadcasts parliamentary sessions and committee meetings, along with some political public-affairs programming;
- a similar channel to CPAC, but broadcasting the proceedings of the provincial legislature;
- network affiliates (typically from the nearest major American city) of ABC, CBS, Fox, NBC, and PBS; (Note: Under CRTC rules, American networks are offered on a "4 + 1" basis, meaning that a cable company may offer any four American commercial networks and PBS on basic cable; other American networks can only be offered on a pay tier. In most cities, this means that The CW and MyNetwork TV are not available on basic cable because of lower demand for those networks. However, cable providers in border cities have been allowed to offer all American networks on basic cable that are available over the air in that market, even if that means more than four commercial networks are provided. American network affiliates are usually provided from the nearest available American market. However, signals distributed by Shaw Broadcast Services (particularly affiliates from Detroit and Rochester) are frequently substituted where cost or technical limitations prevent use of a closer signal.)
- a mixture of Canadian and American special-interest channels (e.g. TSN, MuchMusic, CNN, CTV News Channel, Showcase). (Note: Under CRTC rules, cable companies cannot offer a new American service if a comparable Canadian service already exists. However, if a Canadian equivalent begins operations after an American service has already been added to cable packages, the cable company is not required to discontinue the American service. (For example, Canadian cable companies cannot offer MTV, as the station was not yet available in Canada when MuchMusic began broadcasting in 1984. However, cable companies can offer CNN, as they were already offering that service when CBC Newsworld first aired in 1989.) The rules formerly required that the American service be removed if a Canadian equivalent is launched; this caused controversy when the US version of CMT was removed from the lineup when a new Canadian country music channel called the New Country Network launched. CMT had contested that this was a violation of the North American Free Trade Agreement. Ultimately, Viacom purchased a minority share in the network, and rebranded it under the CMT name.)

A further set of Canadian and American special-interest channels are offered as 'extended cable' packages, which are available for additional fees. In the past, cable companies have engaged in the controversial practice of negative option billing, in which a subscriber is automatically given and billed for the new services unless they specifically declines them, but this is now illegal.

A package of 'pay TV' channels is also available for additional fees, including movie networks such as Crave TV, Movie Central, Super Channel, and Super Écran; and American superstations such as WSBK, WPIX, WGN, and KTLA (which are often affiliated with The CW and MyNetworkTV.) These services, however, require a descrambler box.

A study in 2006 said that the CRTC had licensed 44 digital specialty services and 5 ethnic specialty- and pay-television services across the country.

Cable companies now offer digital cable packages in most Canadian cities, including a number of channels which have been licensed exclusively for digital package distribution. Digital cable also typically includes a range of audio broadcast services such as Galaxie and Max Trax. In some markets, digital cable service may also include local radio stations; where this is offered, it has largely replaced the availability of cable FM service. Digital cable, however, is provided only if a customer chooses to subscribe to that package. As of 2016, cable companies are also now required to offer a "skinny basic" option, whereby a small selection of channels – typically the main over-the-air networks, along with "public service" channels such as The Weather Network and CPAC – are packaged for a maximum fee of $25 with additional channels available on a pick and pay basis at the subscriber's discretion. Although this package has had some popularity, the traditional larger and more expensive cable packages remain the dominant subscription mode.

Although this is sometimes controversial, Canadian cable companies are required by the CRTC to practise simultaneous substitution when a Canadian channel and a non-Canadian channel (which is usually American) are airing the same program at the same time. Programming on an American service may also be blocked if it has significant bearing on a Canadian legal matter (e.g., one episode of Law & Order, inspired by the trials of Paul Bernardo and Karla Homolka, was blocked in Canada) or if it interferes with a Canadian channel's broadcast rights (such as James Bond movies airing on Spike TV; the Canadian broadcast rights are held by Bell Media.)

Many cable companies also offer high speed cable Internet service.

== Radio ==
The first radio broadcast station in Canadian history was WXA in Montreal, later called CINW. The first broadcast was on May 20, 1920. Canada's first national radio network was established by a railway; the national radio was a product of the CNR, a state agency. Through this national radio, its creators saw a way of fostering and promoting immigration, enhancing the image of radio, and supporting the nation through communication with large groups of listeners.

Canada is served by approximately 2,000 radio stations, on both the AM and FM bands.

As with television stations, radio callsigns in Canada are made up of four letters beginning with the two-letter combinations of CF, CH, CI, CJ, or CK, although a few stations use three-letter callsigns. In addition to private stations CKX and CKY, some CBC stations have three-letter callsigns, generally in major cities where the stations first aired in the 1930s. Newer CBC stations have normal four-letter callsigns, however. As with CBC television, CBC radio uses callsigns beginning with CB, through a special arrangement with the government of Chile. A few exceptions, such as CKSB in Winnipeg and CJBC in Toronto, exist where the CBC acquired an existing station with a historically significant callsign.

The combinations CG, CY, CZ and several combinations beginning with V and X are also assigned to Canada. Only four Canadian radio stations, all in St. John's, Newfoundland and Labrador, have taken call signs in those ranges. Three of these stations, VOAR, VOWR and VOCM, began broadcasting before Newfoundland was a Canadian province, and retained their VO call letters when Newfoundland joined Canadian Confederation in 1949. The other station, VOCM-FM, adopted the callsign in 1981 because of its ownership association with VOCM. With the exception of VOCM-FM, radio stations licensed in Newfoundland after 1949 use the same CF-CK range as other Canadian stations.

The future of VO callsigns in Canada is unknown. It would not be at all unusual for Industry Canada to simplify all callsigns used in Canada as part of the ongoing modernization and simplification of domestic telecom regulations.

There is no clear rule for the call letters of repeater stations—some repeaters are labelled by the call-letters of the originating station, followed by a number, while others have their own distinct call letters. Low-power repeater transmitters (LPRTs) have their own unique callsign format, which consists of the letters VE or VF followed by four numbers.

As of 2020, the four largest major commercial radio broadcast groups in Canada are Stingray Group, Rogers Radio, Corus Radio, and Bell Media Radio. However, many smaller broadcasters operate radio stations as well. Most genres of music are represented on the Canadian commercial radio spectrum, including pop, rock, hip-hop, country, jazz and classical. News, sports, talk radio and religious stations are also available in many cities. In addition, many Canadian universities and colleges have licensed campus radio stations, and some communities also have community radio stations or Christian radio stations licensed to non-profit groups or co-operatives. Canada has approximately 14 full-time ethnic radio stations, based primarily in the major metropolitan markets of Toronto, Montreal and Vancouver.

As well, the publicly owned Canadian Broadcasting Corporation operates four national radio networks, two each in English and French. The English Radio One and the French Ici Radio-Canada Première provide news and information programming to most communities in Canada, regardless of size, on either the AM or FM band. The English CBC Music and French Ici Musique provide arts and culture programming, including classical music and opera, and are always on FM, generally serving larger communities only.

Music-based commercial radio stations in Canada are mandated by the Canadian Radio-television and Telecommunications Commission to reserve at least 35 per cent of their playlists for Canadian content, although exemptions are granted in some border cities (e.g. Windsor, Ontario) where the competition from American stations threatens the survival of Canadian broadcasters, and for stations whose formats may not have enough Canadian recordings available to meet the 35 per cent target (e.g. classical, jazz or pop standards).

In recent years, a notable trend in Canadian radio has been the gradual abandonment of the AM band, with many AM stations applying for and receiving authorization from the CRTC to convert to the FM band. In some Canadian cities, in fact, the AM band is now either nearly or entirely vacant. Because Canada is more sparsely populated than the United States, the limitations of AM broadcasting (particularly at night, when the AM dial is often overwhelmed by distant signals) have a much more pronounced effect on Canadian broadcasters. AM radio stations have the additional protection that cable companies which offer cable FM services are required by the CRTC to distribute all locally available AM stations through conversion to a cable FM signal, but cable FM only accounts for a small percentage of radio listeners in Canada.

Digital audio broadcasting, or DAB, is an emerging technology in Canada. Although many radio stations in major metropolitan markets offer digital subchannels with distinct programming from the primary station, not many consumers yet own digital radios and digital broadcasting is usually not available in midsized or small markets. No Canadian radio broadcaster currently operates exclusively in DAB format.

On November 1, 2004, the CRTC began hearing applications for satellite radio services. Three applications were filed: one by XM Radio Canada, one by Sirius Canada, and one by the partnership of CHUM Limited and Astral Media. These services, which were approved by the CRTC on June 16, 2005, were Canada's first official satellite radio services, although a small grey market already existed for American satellite radio receivers. Sirius and XM both launched in December 2005. The CHUM-Astral service, however, was never launched, and its license expired on June 16, 2007; CHUM stated that its business plan was based in part on the expectation that in the interests of Canadian content, the CRTC would have rejected the Sirius and XM applications, approving only the CHUM-Astral service. The two active services, XM and Sirius, merged into SiriusXM Canada in 2011, several months after a similar merger between their American counterparts.

== Newspapers ==
The first period of Canadian journalism spanned from 1752–1807; the second period spanned from 1807–1858; the third period spanned from 1858–1900; the fourth period spans from the beginning of the twentieth century to current day. The first period consisted of newspapers brought and inserted into Canadian society by colonies in New England. The first was the Halifax Gazette, issued on March 23, 1752. The second period began as settlers arrived from Britain and the United States; newspapers began to gain popularity in the Maritime regions. During the third period, the discovery of gold brought settlers to the Pacific Coast region, and there was a growing interest in domestic affairs. Finally, the twentieth century saw a substantial change in Canadian newspapers. After the two world wars, as well as the industrial developments that followed these wars, the circulation of French and English newspapers in Canada increased to more than 5.7 million in 1989. By the mid-1980s, there were 110 daily newspapers. Nowadays, there are 105.

Although online readership has been on the rise, studies by NADbank show that print readership is "business as usual." Nearly 8 in 10 Canadians read a daily newspaper each week, and print readership continues to grow at about 2 percent each year. However, website readership is growing faster, at a rate of 4 percent. Although print readership is currently larger, website readership is growing at a faster rate, suggesting that a takeover is possible in the future. The baby boomer generation, who are over 50 years old, continue to prefer print to online journalism, while younger adults are more likely to read online newspapers due to easier access and limits on time. Furthermore, paid daily newspapers dominate the market but free dailies are gaining popularity in recent times. Advertisers continue to rely on print newspapers to reach Canadians in their home or work environments. For these reasons, print newspapers as a mass medium do not seem to be dying in Canada. They might not be as healthy as they were without any competition from online sources, but they are holding their own ground, according to Statistics Canada.

Canada currently has two major national newspapers: The Globe and Mail and National Post. Though not widely read outside Quebec, Le Devoir is the French-language counterpart to the national newspapers. The newspaper with the highest circulation overall is the Toronto Star, while the newspaper with the highest readership per capita is the Windsor Star (with the Calgary Herald running a very close second).

In addition, almost all Canadian cities are served by at least one daily newspaper, along with community and neighbourhood weeklies. In large cities that have more than one daily newspaper, usually at least one daily is a tabloid format; bilingual cities like Montreal and Ottawa have important papers in both French and English.

Canadian newspapers are mostly owned by large chains. At various times there have been concerns about concentration of newspaper ownership, notably in 1970 and 1980 with two commissions, the Davey Committee on combines and the Kent Royal Commission on Newspapers respectively, as well as more recently when Conrad Black's Hollinger acquired Southam Newspapers in the late 1990s. When Hollinger sold its Canadian properties, however, many of their smaller-market newspapers were in fact purchased by a variety of new ownership groups such as Osprey Media, increasing the diversity of newspaper ownership for the first time in many years.

Newspapers owned by large chains, 2018
Title	Daily newspapers	Community newspapers	Total newspapers
Postmedia Network Inc. / Sun Media	35	86	121
Torstar Corp. / Metroland	12	78	100
Black Press Ltd.	3	85	88
snapd Inc.	0	72	72
Glacier Media / Alta Newspaper Group	5	44	49
SaltWire Network	8	25	33
TransMet Logistics/Metropolitan Media	1	25	26
Brunswick News Inc.^{[a]}	3	19	22
TC Media	0	21	21
Icimédias inc.	0	20	20

^{a}Brunswick News Inc. was purchased by Postmedia in 2022.

Additionally, the 1980s and 1990s saw the emergence of city-based alternative weekly newspapers, geared toward a younger audience with coverage of the arts and alternative news. In recent years, many of these weeklies have also been acquired or driven out of business by conglomerates like Canwest, Quebecor and Brunswick News. Smaller newspapers like The Dominion, publishing primarily online but in a newspaper format, have attempted to fill gaps in Canada's journalistic coverage while avoiding the vulnerabilities of the previous generation of alternative media.

In the 2000s, a number of online news and culture magazines also launched with the goal of providing alternative sources of journalism. Some important online publications include rabble.ca, The Tyee, The Vancouver Observer, and SooToday.com. Similarly, as of 2006, Canada had over 250 ethnic newspapers.

The late 2010s have seen an expansion in online news partisan outlets with ties to the major political parties in Canada, such as North99 with the Liberal Party, The Post Millennial with the Conservatives, and PressProgress with the NDP have received attention though their massive mostly social-based following.

== Films ==
Given Canada's small market and its position next to the United States—the dominant producer of feature films—the Canadian film industry receives substantial assistance from the government. In the 2000s, about half of the budget of a typical Canadian film came from various federal and provincial government sources.

According to the Canadian Encyclopedia:

The first Canadian films were produced in the fall of 1897, a year after the first public exhibition of motion pictures on 27 June 1896 in Montréal. They were made by James Freer, a Manitoba farmer, and depicted life on the Prairies. In 1898–99, the Canadian Pacific Railway showed them throughout the UK to promote immigration. They were so successful that the federal government sponsored a second tour by Freer in 1902 and the CPR began directly financing production of immigration films.

Most of Canada's film (and television) industry produces output geared towards mainstream North American audiences, with Entertainment One and Elevation Pictures in particular enjoying significant successes in recent years. Montréal, Toronto and Vancouver are major production centres, with Vancouver being the second largest film and television production centre in North America (after Los Angeles). The Toronto International Film Festival is considered one of the most important events in North American cinema, showcasing both Canadian talent and Hollywood films.

According to an article in the Toronto Star, the Canadian film industry has always had problems with creating a popular culture because of the shadow of the United States' film industry. For this reason, Canadian films have failed due to a lack of an export market. Canadian actors frequently relocate to Hollywood to further their careers. Also, unlike radio and television, there is no protection for Canadian content in movie theatres. It is clear that Hollywood movies are a lot more popular in Canada than Canadian-made movies. As a whole, the film industry (Hollywood) continues to make substantial profits in Canada as well as around the world; it can, therefore, be said that the medium is not dying.

Alliance was by far the largest and most successful Canadian film studio, both as a film and television production house (the company's television properties include Due South, This Hour Has 22 Minutes and C.S.I.), and as the major Canadian distributor of independent American and international films. On January 9, 2013, the company was acquired by Entertainment One.

As a result of the economic challenges involved in Canadian film production, film funding is often provided by government bodies such as Telefilm Canada, and television services such as CBC Television, Crave or Super Channel are often a Canadian film's most lucrative potential market. However, there is an established network of film festivals which also provide important marketing and audience opportunities for Canadian films. In addition to the Toronto International Film Festival, the smaller Vancouver International Film Festival features films from around the world, and other major festivals in Montréal, Calgary, Edmonton and Greater Sudbury—among other cities—are also important opportunities for Canadian filmmakers to gain exposure among more populist film audiences.

One particular film production house, the National Film Board of Canada, has become internationally famous for its animation and documentary production.

== Publishing ==
=== Books ===
The first incident of printing in Canada came in 1752 with the Halifax Gazette. The history of the printed book is slightly different. In 1761, Anton Heinrich took over John Bushell's printing shop in Halifax. James Rivingston, a member of a family involved with bookselling and stationery in London, advertised a large stock of books and stationery for sale in Halifax. The first printing shop was established in 1764 by William Brown and Thomas Gilmore in Quebec. The earliest recorded almanac published in Canada was L'almanac de cabinet, printed by Brown and Gilmore in 1765.

=== Magazines ===
The first Canadian periodicals were established in Nova Scotia by people from New England. The first Canadian magazine was called Nova Scotia Magazine and Comprehensive Review of Literature, Politics, and News. It was edited by William Cochran and printed by John Howe. Publication began in 1789 and lasted three years. This magazine dealt mostly with affairs concerning the British public, despite its being published at a time of colonization in Canada. After this first publication, most magazines over the next fifty years in Canada only lasted a few years, often only a few months. The first ever bilingual magazine, published in 1792, was entitled Le Magasin de Québec; it was published by Samuel Neilson. Journalist and historian Michel Bibaud published La Bibliothèque Canadienne from 1825 to 1830, and John Lovell published the Literary Garland from 1838 to 1851. These were the most well-known exceptions to the rule that magazines lasted only a few years. In the second half of the nineteenth century, the pace of magazine publishing in Canada picked up significantly. George Desbarats launched Canadian Illustrated News in 1869 and it lasted until 1883. Canadian Illustrated News was closely identified with a new emerging sense of Canadian nationalism, like other magazines of the time. Through the use of many pictures, Desbarats felt that the magazine would instill a sense of pride in readers for their Canadian name and society.

According to David Renard, "Over the next 10 years, the magazine industry will experience deep-rooted change from primarily a print-oriented business to one where digital products will represent the largest share of a smaller periodical industry. We expect digital to be the primary source of revenue for magazines past the 2016–2017 time frame." He claims that although print is not dead, the magazine industry might become obsolete. Although he is referring to periodicals in the United States, similar patterns exist in Canada, since over ninety percent of the most popular periodicals sold in Canada are American. Some say that magazines are evolving rather than dying; they are adapting to new technology by creating online versions. For example, iPad versions of magazines have been created recently. However, this still implies that the printed medium of periodicals is dying while online versions are gaining popularity.

A notable controversy in Canadian magazine publishing in recent years has been the existence of split run magazines, where a title published in another country, such as TIME or Sports Illustrated, is republished in Canada with a few pages of special Canadian content, in order to take advantage of Canadian advertising sales revenues. The government of Canada imposed a special excise tax on split run publications in 1995 to discourage the practice, although this continues to be controversial.

== Online media ==
In the 1950s and 1960s, with the creation of computers, is where the history of the Internet begins. In 1969 came the invention of ARPANET, the first network to run on packet-switching technology. These were the first hosts on what would one day become the Internet. The concept of email was first created by Ray Tomlinson in 1971, and this innovation was followed by Project Gutenberg and eBooks. Tim Berners-Lee is considered the inventor of the World Wide Web; he implemented the first successful communication between a HyperText Transfer Protocol client and a server.

Because the Internet allowed users ease of access to information about practically any topic, the medium has seen immense popularity ever since its inception. There has never been a point in its relatively short history (it has only been around for about 40 years) when it has declined in popularity. Of all mass media discussed, it seems to be the least threatened. There are various reasons for this: firstly, the Internet provides for its audiences a compilation of almost everything that other electronic media provide, in one convenient medium (a computer). For example, one can watch television shows, films, and listen to the radio online. There is little need for separate devices when everything is available in one. Secondly, the Internet allows for portability and accessibility of information. One no longer has to go to the library for information or go to a theatre in order to watch a film. Thirdly, most content on the Internet is available for free, which makes it more convenient for users. The foremost priority for the Internet has always been to better communication, and it does provide easy and fast communication through email, chat rooms, and online communities; it is also interactive in these ways. There are, however, disadvantages of this medium which do not exist in other electronic media: potential theft of personal information, spamming, and unwanted explicit content. However, as all of these disadvantages can be blocked through the use of protection software, they are not enough to override its advantages.

== See also ==
- Cinema of Canada
- Censorship in Canada
- History of Canadian newspapers
- Media ownership in Canada
  - Concentration of media ownership in Canada
- Multicultural media in Canada
- Canadian Communications Foundation
- List of radio stations in Ontario
- Television in Canada
- Western media
