= Media ownership in Canada =

Media ownership in Canada is governed by the Canadian Radio-television and Telecommunications Commission (CRTC), with regard to audiovisual media and telecom networks, as well as other agencies with more specific jurisdiction, in the case of non-broadcast media—like the Competition Bureau, with regard to competition matters and Department of Canadian Heritage regarding foreign investment in the cultural sector. The CRTC implements the policies of the Broadcasting Act and the Telecommunications Act within Canada but, because its jurisdiction is limited to these, does not regulate the ownership of newspapers or non-audiovisual Internet activity. They have taken press and non-audiovisual Internet activity into consideration in deciding on broadcasting matters. Thus far, the CRTC has undertaken very little regulation of Internet-based audiovisual programming.

== Media Concentration in Canada ==
The Canadian media industry is not governed exclusively by free-market economics but rather through a combination of public and private enterprise. Apart from a limited number of community broadcasters, media in Canada are primarily owned by a small number of companies: Bell, Corus, Rogers, Quebecor and the government-owned Canadian Broadcasting Corporation. Each of these companies holds a diverse mix of over-the-air television, cable television, radio, newspaper, magazine, and/or internet operations. A few smaller media companies exist within the Canadian media landscape as well. In 2007, CTVglobemedia, Astral Media, Quebecor, Canwest Global, and Rogers all expanded significantly, through the acquisitions of CHUM Limited, Standard Broadcasting, Osprey Media, Alliance Atlantis, and Citytv, respectively. In 2010, Canwest was sold off and split between Shaw (now Corus) and Postmedia Network due to financial troubles.

Between 1990 and 2005, there were a number of media corporate mergers and takeovers in Canada. While 17.3% of daily newspapers were independently owned in 1990, only 6% of daily newspapers were independently owned by 2017. These changes, among others, caused the Senate Standing Committee on Transport and Communications to launch a study of Canadian news media in March 2003. (This topic had been examined twice in the past, by the Davey Commission (1970) and the Kent Commission (1981), both of which produced recommendations that were never implemented in any meaningful way.)

The Senate Committee’s final report, released in June 2006, expressed concern about the effects of the current levels of news media ownership in Canada. Specifically, the Committee discussed their concerns regarding the following trends: the potential of media ownership concentration to limit news diversity and reduce news quality, the Canadian Radio-television and Telecommunications Commission (CRTC) and Competition Bureau’s ineffectiveness at stopping media ownership concentration, the lack of federal funding for the CBC and the broadcaster’s uncertain mandate and role, diminishing employment standards for journalists (including decreased job security, less journalistic freedom and new contractual threats to intellectual property), a lack of Canadian training and research institutes and difficulties with the federal government’s support for print media and the absence of funding for the internet-based news media.

The Senate report expressed particular concern about the concentration of ownership in the province of New Brunswick where the Irving business empire owns all the English-language daily newspapers and most of the weeklies. Senator Joan Fraser, author of the report, stated: "We didn't find anywhere else in the developed world a situation like the situation in New Brunswick."

The report provided 40 recommendations and 10 suggestions (for areas outside of federal government jurisdiction), including legislation amendments that would trigger automatic reviews of a proposed media merger if certain thresholds are reached and CRTC regulation revisions to ensure that access to the broadcasting system is encouraged and that a diversity of news and information programming is available through these services.

== Role within small markets ==
Due to Canada's smaller population, some types of media consolidation have always been allowed. In small markets where the population could not adequately support multiple television stations competing for advertising revenue, the CRTC began permitting twinstick operations, in which the same company operated both CBC and CTV affiliates in the same market, in 1967. This model of television ownership was restricted to smaller markets until the mid-1990s, when the CRTC began to allow companies to own multiple television stations in large markets such as Toronto, Montreal and Vancouver.

== National media conglomerates ==
As of 2007, almost all Canadian television stations are owned by national media conglomerates. Most, in fact, are directly owned and operated by their associated networks, although even the few private affiliate stations are almost entirely owned by non-network conglomerates rather than local companies. These acquisitions have been controversial; stations in smaller markets have frequently had their local news programming cut back or even eliminated. For instance, CTV's stations in Northern Ontario and in Atlantic Canada are served by a single regional newscast for each region, with only brief local news inserts for headlines of purely local interest. This, in turn, has contributed to the rise of independent local web media such as SooToday.com, The Tyee, and rabble.ca. Based on revenue in 2015, Bell owns 21.4% of market share in Canada. The next leading would be Shaw with 13.4%, Rogers with 8.3%, and Quebecor with 7.5%. This has been controversial because large media corporations now make it harder for smaller media companies to compete in Canada.

== Controls over mergers ==
Many, though not all, Canadian newspapers are also owned by the same media conglomerates which own the television networks. Companies which own both television and newspaper assets have strict controls on the extent to which they can merge the operations. The issue of newspaper ownership has been particularly controversial in Canada, especially in the mid-1990s when Conrad Black's Hollinger acquired the Southam chain. Black's 1999 sale of the Hollinger papers resulted in an increase in the diversity of newspaper ownership, with new ownership groups such as Osprey Media entering the business, but was even more controversial because the CRTC, waiving its former rules against broadcasting companies acquiring newspaper assets, permitted Canwest Global to purchase many of the Hollinger papers. The Toronto Star is a partial exception to this — it is owned by Toronto Star Newspapers Ltd., a subsidiary of Torstar — but was itself a part owner of CTVglobemedia.

== Radio norms ==
As of 2022, in radio markets with eight commercial radio stations broadcasting in a single language, a licensee is normally restricted to owning no more than four stations in that language, of which up to three can be the same broadcast band (i.e. a company may own three English FM stations and an AM station, but may not own two AM stations unless one broadcasts in a non-English language). In markets with fewer than eight stations, a single licensee may own up to three stations, with no restriction on frequency band. CRTC regulations do not prevent a company from exceeding the station cap through ownership of rimshot stations in neighbouring markets, although all stations are expected to include news and information content that is relevant to their city of license.

Under certain circumstances, local marketing agreements may be implemented, or the ownership rule may be waived entirely. For example, Bell Media owns most of the commercial broadcast outlets in Windsor, Ontario due to the city's unique circumstances. Due to its proximity of the Metro Detroit market in the United States, Windsor has historically been a difficult market for commercial broadcasters, so the CRTC waived its usual ownership restrictions to help protect the Windsor stations' financial viability.

When licensing a new broadcast outlet, the CRTC has a general (but not strict) tendency to favour new and local broadcasters. However, in the modern media context, such broadcasters often struggle for financial viability, and are often subsequently acquired by larger companies. The CRTC rarely denies the acquisition applications. Canada also has strict laws around non-Canadian ownership of cultural industries where a media company in Canada may not be more than 20% foreign-owned.

== Broadcasting Public Notice CRTC 2008-4 ==
Before 2008, the CRTC had long had common ownership policies limiting the number of radio stations and over-the-air television stations a person could control in a single geographic market in the same language. But it did not have cross-media policies or regulations limiting the number of types of media owned by one person. Under new rules announced in 2008, the CRTC limited companies to two types of media in a given market — a company may, for example, own television and radio assets in one city, or radio and newspaper, or television and newspaper, but may not own all three simultaneously. In addition, with the ownership of cable specialty channels increasingly consolidating under the same few media conglomerates that own most of the country's conventional television stations, the CRTC also imposed a market share cap; no company can own broadcasting assets holding more than 45% of the country's total television viewership.

The new regulations had no effect on past mergers but were designed to stop the Canadian media landscape from greater concentration and to prevent further takeover of smaller media companies. Two notable exceptions are The Globe and Mail and the National Post, which the CRTC deem as national newspapers rather than local publications. As such, they do not impact the rule changes.

The rule changes by the CRTC essentially preserve the status quo but there is one area that could see a big impact in years to come—the 45% cap on audience share—because this would limit how many specialty channels a broadcaster can own. To determine audience share, the figure is calculated by adding up each broadcasting asset owned by a particular company based on BBM Nielsen ratings data then comparing it to the total audience based on the same ratings compiled across Canada. The rule change which restricts cable and satellite carriers from controlling the delivery of programming would effectively prevent Shaw Communications, which owns Shaw cable in the West and the StarChoice satellite service from buying the rival Bell ExpressVu Satellite service.

The new rule changes in 2008 were implemented after a period of record deals in the Canadian media sector. CRTC chair Konrad von Fickenstein said these policies will help develop a clear approach to assessing future transactions in the broadcasting industry and "preserve the plurality of editorial voices and the diversity of programming available to Canadians, both locally and nationally, while allowing for a strong and competitive industry."

== Canadian Media Concentration Research Project ==
The CMCRP is an ongoing data-driven research effort assessing the ownership concentration of "more than a dozen sectors of the telecom-media-internet industries in Canada." Industries assessed include:

- Radio
- Broadcast Television
- Specialty and Pay television services
- Cable, Satellite & IPTV Distributors
- Newspapers
- Magazines and Periodicals
- Music
- Film
- Book publishing
- Search Engines
- Social Media
- Internet Service Providers
- Wireline Telecommunications
- Wireless Telecommunications

The principal investigator of the project is Dwayne Winseck, a professor at Carleton University in Ottawa, Ontario.

== See also ==
- Concentration of media ownership
- Mass media
- Media of Canada
- History of Canadian newspapers
