= Pierre Dufault =

Canadian journalist and sports commentator (1934–2025)

- Born: November 5, 1934; Ottawa, Ontario, Canada
- Died: October 31, 2025 (aged 90)
- Education: University of Ottawa
- Occupations: Journalist, sports commentator
- Years active: 1952–1998
- Known for: Radio-Canada; Canadian Football League
- Awards: Canadian Football Hall of Fame (2001)

Pierre Dufault (November 5, 1934 – October 31, 2025) was a Canadian journalist and sports commentator. He began as a political correspondent and reporter for the Canadian Football League (CFL) on CKCH radio, then on CBOFT-DT television. He joined the sports department of Radio-Canada in 1972 as a play-by-play announcer for CFL games, and regularly covered the Olympic Games and Commonwealth Games. He was president of Football Reporters of Canada in 1984, became the late-night sports host for Radio-Canada in 1993, and was inducted into the reporters section of the Canadian Football Hall of Fame in 2001.

== Early life and education ==
Dufault was born on November 5, 1934, in the Lower Town neighbourhood of Ottawa. (Note: Dufault was born in Ottawa on November 5, 1934.: Dufault's birth date is calculated as November 5, 1934, since he was reported to have had his 86th birth date on November 5, 2020.; Dufault was born and raised in the Lower Town of Ottawa.) He became interested in Canadian football in 1948 at the 36th Grey Cup. He started in journalism in 1952, writing for Ottawa's French language daily newspaper, Le Droit. Dufault later said he was fired a few months into the job for not being competent enough, and subsequently studied at the University of Ottawa.

== Professional career ==
Dufault worked in radio at CKCH in Hull, Quebec, from 1955 to 1964, where he started as a reporter then eventually became the director. During his tenure at CKCH he began a career covering the Canadian Football League (CFL), broadcasting games of the Ottawa Rough Riders.

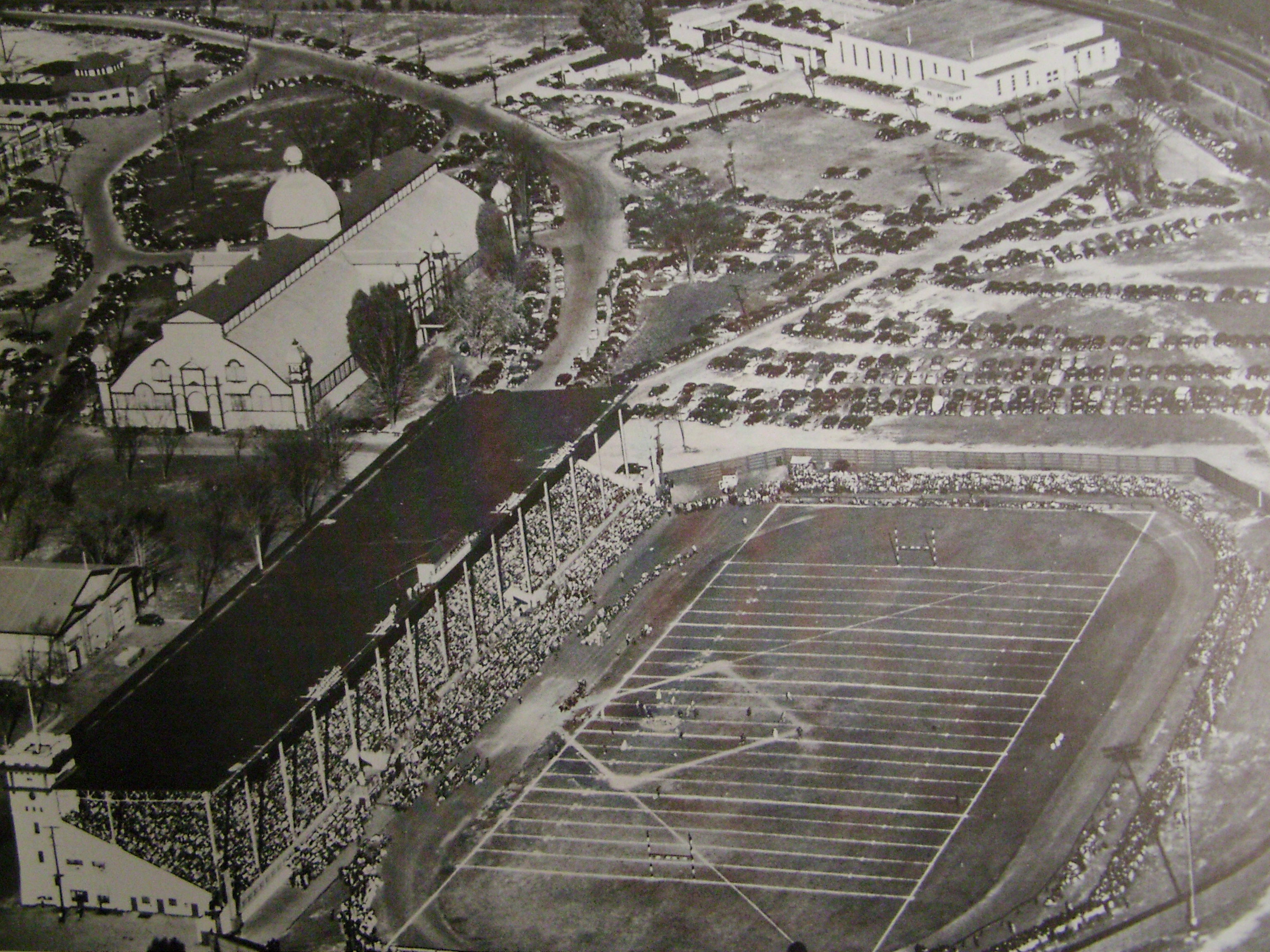
Lansdowne Park c. 1950, home field of the Ottawa Rough Riders

As a political correspondent, Dufault reported on 22 municipal, provincial and federal elections. He then worked for Radio-Canada at CBOFT-DT in Ottawa from 1964 to 1972. CBOFT-DT broadcast French language coverage of the 1968 Canadian federal election on short notice when a conflict arose the day before the election between Radio-Canada in Montreal and the local journalists' union. Dufault was phoned at home 50 minutes before the broadcast was to begin and rushed to the studios as an emergency news anchor. According to Dufault, station management congratulated him for a job well done the next day, but had been uninformed of his prior work as a political correspondent. In 1987, he hosted a special program on the death of René Lévesque.

Relocating to Montreal and joining the sports department for Radio-Canada in 1972, Dufault did radio broadcasts of the Olympic Games from 1972 until 1980, then Olympics television broadcasts until 1998. He was a regular commentator on aquatic events, including swimming, synchronized swimming, and water polo, and covered swimming events for the Commonwealth Games from 1974 to 1994. Also with Radio-Canada, he provided French-language commentary on college basketball, and narrated the French-language documentary on the World Curling Championships filmed at the 1974 Air Canada Silver Broom.

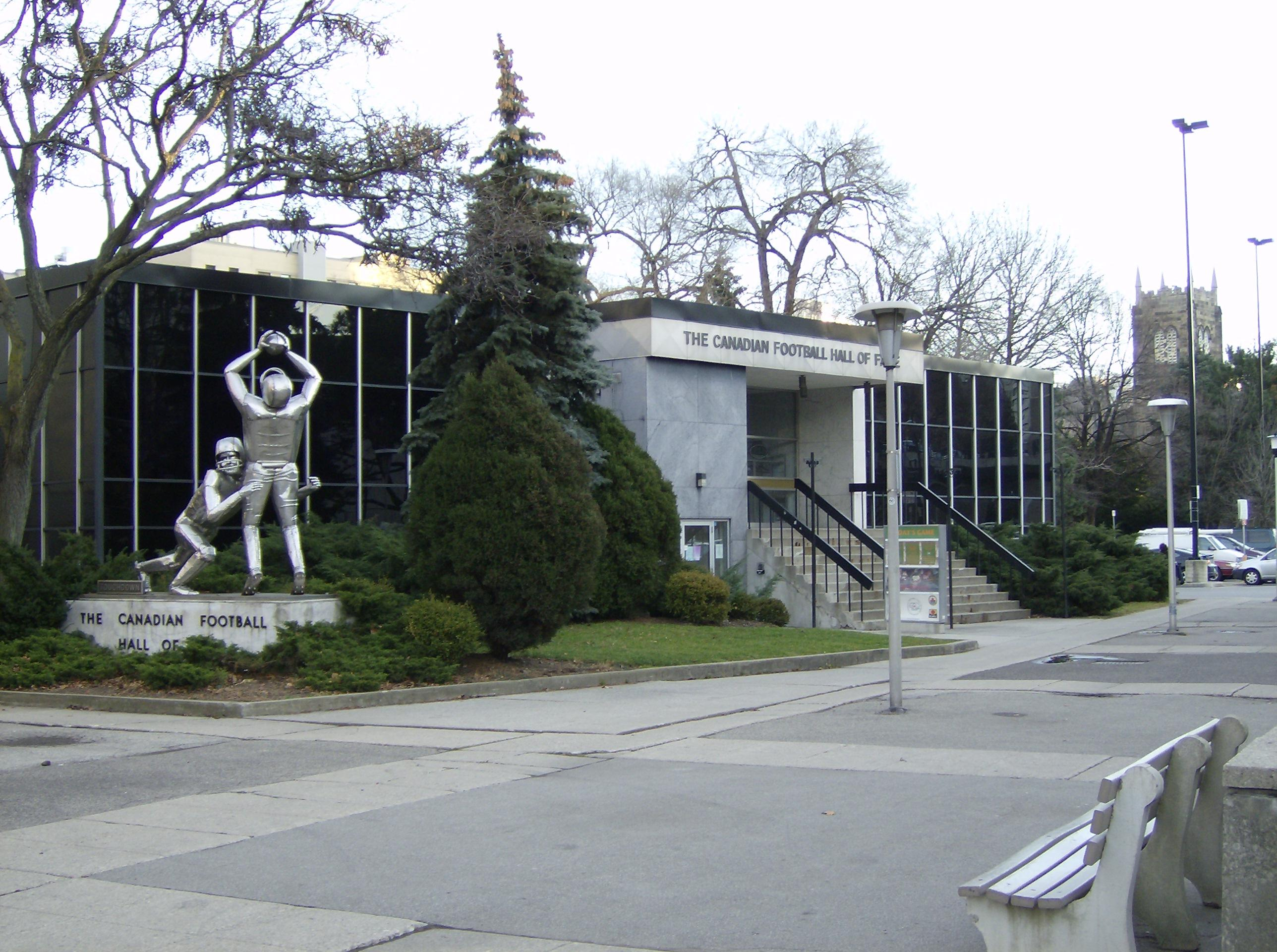
The Canadian Football Hall of Fame and Museum, c. 2007

Dufault was a regular play-by-play announcer for CFL games on Radio-Canada from 1973 to 1988. He and Ernie Afaganis cohosted the bilingual presentation of the Schenley Awards in the 1980s, first broadcast live in 1983. Dufault was president of the Football Reporters of Canada for the 1984 season, an organization which represented sportscasters and sportswriters in nine CFL cities. He became the late night sports report host for Radio-Canada in 1993.

Dufault began teaching a radio course in Canadian French at The Dave Boxer School of Broadcasting in 1979, then became a part-owner in 1981. Renamed the ProMedia School of Communication in 1981, it trained multiple generations of radio and television broadcasters in Quebec. The school rebranded as ProMédia+ in 2025. ProMédia+ trained more than 3200 journalists as of 2025.

Although retired from full-time sports broadcasting in 1996, he gave interviews and remained a French-language expert on the Grey Cup and CFL history. He was inducted into the media section of the Canadian Football Hall of Fame in 2001, during a ceremony at the 89th Grey Cup hosted in Montreal. Journalist Cam Cole wrote that Dufault seemed for a couple decades "the lone, caring, eloquent link between francophones and the CFL game". Jim Coleman wrote that Dufault was dedicated to promoting Canadian football, crediting him as "magnificently multi-lingual" and "charming"; and "one of the most beautifully bilingual persons in this country".

In a 2018 interview with Le Droit, Dufault recalled that he pieced together an eight-minute radio report of what happened in the Munich massacre at the 1972 Summer Olympics, and claimed to have been the first reporter at the scene. He also stated that his coverage of the 1968 Canadian federal election and the Munich massacre were days he would never forget. He referred to himself as a "voice guy", and that he worked for Radio-Canada at a time when its sports commentators, hosts and journalists were hired for their skills, knowledge and experience, rather than a reputation as an athlete or a coach.

== Personal life and death ==
Dufault organized the city golf championship tournament while in Hull, Quebec. He played in professional-celebrity fundraising golf tournaments, and organized the Montreal Media Golf Tournament fundraiser to benefit the Quebec Society of Crippled Children.

Dufault was married, but had left his wife by the early 1980s. He later lived for five years with a girlfriend who was also a radio announcer. In 1988, he pleaded guilty to three charges of mischief when he glued the locks of the ex-girlfriend's vehicle. He was a nephew of artist and writer Ernest Dufault, better known by the alias Will James. He was also related to singer Luce Dufault.

Dufault enjoyed history including Second World War books. He died at age 90 on October 31, 2025.
