= CJLV =

Radio station in Laval, Quebec, Canada

Laval, Quebec; Canada
- Broadcast area: Greater Montreal
- Frequency: 1570 kHz
- Branding: La Radio de vos Souvenirs

Programming
- Language: French
- Format: Oldies/Full Service

Ownership
- Owner: Radio Humsafar; (7590474 Canada, Inc.)
- Sister stations: CHRN, CIRF

History
- First air date: March 9, 2004
- Former call signs: CFAV (2004–2010)
- Call sign meaning: Laval

Technical information
- Class: B
- Power: 10,000 watts
- Transmitter coordinates: 45°31′51″N 73°50′29″W

Links
- Webcast: Listen Live
- Website: 1570.ca

CJLV is a French-language Canadian radio station located in Laval, Quebec, near Montreal. Owned and operated by Radio Humsafar Inc, it broadcasts on 1570 kHz with a power of 10,000 watts as a class B station, using a directional antenna pointing east which has a slightly directional pattern during the day and a much tighter pattern at night, to protect Class-A clear-channel station XERF-AM in Ciudad Acuña, Coahuila, Mexico. The station's nighttime signal has been received by many DXers in Europe and is considered there as one of the "easy" targets for Transatlantic DX.

== History ==
The station received CRTC approval on July 2, 2003 for a new commercial French-language AM radio station in Laval by Gilles Lajoie and Colette Chabot. The station's format evolved from a mix of adult standards and oldies when the station opened on March 9, 2004, to a more traditional oldies format focused on the 1960s, '70s and early '80s in July 2010. Initially identifying itself as Radio Nostalgie, the station later identified itself as Radio Boomer AM 1570.

The 1570 kHz frequency used to be home of the now-defunct CKLM, also located in Laval but using 50,000 watts of power instead of only 10,000 watts. That station opened in December 1962 and went dark in July 1994.

In Spring 2007, the sale of CFAV and Diffusion Laval to Pierre Marchand was approved. Since then, the format has been tweaked to include some '80s music as well, especially during weekdays. In fact, since February 2008, Radio Boomer has played music from 1960 to 1985. The station also plays some country music during the weekends.

In July 2010, Radio Humsafar Inc. purchased the station and assumed its operations, while changing to a more traditional oldies format. The Radio Boomer branding was soon dropped, and the station was re-branded as La Radio de vos Souvenirs. Mr. Jasvir Singh Sandhu the new owner announced that the station would eventually be relaunched with a new call sign, CJLV on July 24, 2010. During that period, CJLV played a wide variety of classic hits in French and English.

On May 3, 2011, the station received approval to continue the operation of CJLV, as well as approving the sale of the station to 7590474 Canada, a numbered company controlled by Radio Humsafar Inc.

In 2013, CJLV changed its branding once again to AM 1570, with the tagline La Radio de vos Souvenirs. The bilingual oldies format remained intact, and was expanded to a full service format with news and sports updates throughout the day. Several new specialty programs were also added to the schedule.

In 2018, CJLV began brokering airtime to independent producers hosting French language programs and a limited amount of hours during the week to foreign language programs brokered to independent producers.

== See also ==
- List of radio stations in Quebec
