= CHEV (AM) =

Former radio station in Toronto-Markham, Ontario

- Toronto–Markham, Ontario; Canada
- Frequency: 1610 kHz
- Branding: CHEV Radio

Programming
- Format: Community radio/News/Sports

Ownership
- Owner: Bruce Ferguson

History
- First air date: 1997
- Last air date: 2004 (continued until 2011 online)

CHEV was a Canadian radio station, which formerly broadcast at 1610 kHz in Toronto, Ontario. A low-power AM station licensed primarily to broadcast special events, the station became best known for airing junior hockey games.

== History ==
In 1997, BAF Audio Visual Incorporated of Scarborough was given approval by the Canadian Radio-television and Telecommunications Commission to launch the station.

CHEV's former logo

As an unprotected low-power station, CHEV was forced to vacate the 1610 frequency in 2004 when the San Lorenzo Latin American Community Centre was awarded the frequency for CHHA, a new Spanish community radio station, although the CRTC renewed CHEV's license conditional on the station finding a new frequency.

On its website, the station subsequently promoted itself as an active community radio station in Markham, covering community events such as the Markham Fair and community sporting events, and playing music by local artists. Although it was not broadcasting on a conventional radio band, the station continued to provide an internet radio stream and its license to relaunch on AM remained active.

On November 19, 2007, CHEV announced via its blog that it would not broadcast for an undetermined period due to renovations being done in the studio. On November 28, 2007, CHEV launched a new website, and on December 12, 2007, CHEV returned to the internet.

The station's licence was renewed on August 31, 2009. In April 2010, the station was granted a three-month license renewal, ending July 31, in which the CRTC advised that it would not renew the station's license again if a new permanent frequency application had not been filed by May 17. An application was not received, and the station's website ceased operation in 2011.
