= William Lore =

Chinese Canadian Navy lieutenant (1909–2012)

William Lore RCN (William K.L. Lore/Traditional Chinese : 羅景鎏, February 28, 1909 – September 22, 2012) was a lieutenant in the Royal Canadian Navy during World War II. He was the first Chinese Canadian to join the Royal Canadian Navy and also the first person of Chinese descent to serve in any of the British Commonwealth navies.

Born in Victoria, British Columbia, on February 28, 1909. William Lore was a second generation Chinese Canadian.

In the 1930s, Lore wrote for The Chinese Times newspaper of Vancouver after leaving school due to financial reasons.

== World War Two ==
When the Second World War broke out in 1939, Lore, among many Chinese Canadians at the time, was eager make his contribution to his country by enlisting with the Canadian armed forces. Despite his efforts to enlist, he was rejected by the Royal Canadian Navy on three occasions. The grounds for the rejection for his enlistment into the RCN were not due to his lack of skills or physical condition, but due to his ethnic background for being Chinese.

This is because during this time, many Chinese Canadian and other minority groups were initially denied the opportunity serve and protect their Canadian home, based on their racial and ethnic heritage. Patricia Roy argues that the rationale for the initial exclusion of these ethnic minority groups to enlist in the armed forces was that the Canadian government at the time knew that by allowing minority groups to enlist in the armed forces, it would lead to giving these minority groups the concession and legitimacy to access the same citizenship rights and services as Anglo-Canadian citizens. Therefore, in light of this, the Canadian government in the early years of the conflict did not post the enlistment for volunteers towards the Chinese Canadian and other minority group communities.

However, this changed in 1943 when the Canadian military recruitment policies changed, and William Lore was finally able to enlist with the RCN. At the personal request of Vice Admiral Percy F. Nelles, who was the acting Chief of Naval Staff for the RCN at the time, Lore was accepted into the RCN; he was the first Chinese Canadian to officially serve in the RCN. Additionally, he also gained the distinction of being the first individual of Chinese descent to have served in any of the naval forces of the British Commonwealth.

Throughout the course of the war, Lore, initially as an acting sub-lieutenant, served in several theaters of the conflict, first in Ottawa, Canada under the Operational Intelligence Center at the Canadian Naval Service Headquarters. He then moved to London, United Kingdom, where he was posted alongside the Combined Services Radio Intelligence Unit for a period of time. His next assignment saw Lore being embedded with the Southeast Asia Command under the command of Lord Admiral Louis Mountbatten.

By August 1945, whilst Japan was undergoing negotiations of an official surrender following the atomic bombings of Hiroshima and Nagasaki by the United States, Lore was next loaned to the British Pacific Fleet. He was later a part of the British Fleet that sailed into Hong Kong Harbor, which had been under the Japanese Imperial Army's occupation since its takeover in 1941. There he became the first allied officer to land ashore to Hong Kong with a detachment of royal marines to liberate Hong Kong by taking over the facilities at HMS Tamar, the British Royal Navy's shore base prior to the Fall of Hong Kong. On August 30, Lore led a detachment of troops with interpreters to the Imperial Japanese Prisoner of War Camp located in Sham Shui Po, where many of the Canadian, British and Hong Kong prisoners of war were imprisoned and held under atrocious conditions by the Imperial Japanese military.

== Postwar ==
William Lore was promoted to lieutenant-commander in 1946. He retired from the navy in 1948. He then earned a law degree at Oxford University and moved to Hong Kong to set up a legal practice. Lore lived there until his death at the age of 103.
