= CJWI =

Multilingual radio station in Montreal

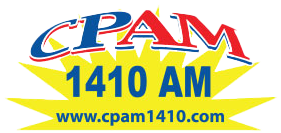
- Montreal, Quebec; Canada
- Frequency: 1410 kHz
- Branding: CPAM Radio Union

Programming
- Format: multilingual

Ownership
- Owner: Groupe Médias Pam Inc.
- Sister stations: CJMS

History
- First air date: 2002
- Former frequencies: 1610 kHz (2002–2009)

Technical information
- Class: B
- Power: 10,000 watts
- Transmitter coordinates: 45°34′19.5″N 73°36′11.7″W

Links
- Webcast: Listen Live
- Website: cpam1410.com

CJWI (1410 AM, CPAM Radio Union) is a French-language Canadian radio station located in Montreal, Quebec. Its studios are located on East Cremazie Boulevard in Montreal.

Owned and operated by Groupe Médias Pam Inc., a licensee owned by Jean Ernest Pierre, a Haitian-born lawyer and businessman who immigrated to Canada in the late 1970s, CJWI used to broadcast on 1610 kHz with a power of 1,000 watts as a class C station, using an omnidirectional antenna. Because of its location on a sparsely populated extended band frequency, its signal has been heard by DXers everywhere in North America since it opened during the summer of 2002. The station received CRTC approval to operate a new French-language ethnic AM radio station in Montréal on November 7, 2001.

The station has a variety format targeting ethnic minorities, primarily Haitian immigrants but also the Latin American and French-speaking African communities. Programming is predominantly Haitian Creole, it also features programming in French and Spanish. It is known as "CPAM Radio Union", although on-air is identified as CPAM 1410.

CJWI had the particularity of having its transmitter site on the top of a building, a rarity among AM stations. It used a short Valcom fibreglass whip antenna mounted atop a warehouse located on Jarry Street in Montreal, near Autoroute 40.

On May 20, 2009, CJWI applied to change its AM frequency from 1610 kHz to 1410 kHz and by increasing the transmitter power from 1,000 watts to 10,000 watts day and night. CJWI received CRTC approval to move from 1610 to 1410 kHz on October 26, 2009. (1610 would later be occupied in 2014 by CHRN, an ethnic station owned by Radio Humsafar.)

On April 28, 2013, CJWI is simulcasting on both 1610 and 1410, which ended on or before June 3.

The 1410 transmitter site is at Saint-Constant close to Autoroute 30 and uses a Nautel XR-12 solid state transmitter. The site was shared with CJMS 1040, which was owned by Groupe Médias Pam from December 2014 until that station's closure in December 2020. In fact the whip antenna has at last been located close to the junction of Pie-IX and Jarry. The area is Saint Leonard.
