= The New Republic (newspaper) =

Defunct Chinese-language newspaper

The New Republic or New Republic Chinese Daily (Chinese: 新民國報; pinyin: Xin Minguo Bao; Wade–Giles: Hsin minkuo pao) was a Chinese language newspaper published first in Victoria and then in Vancouver, Canada possibly from 1912 to 1984. Most early issues of the newspaper were lost or were sporadically preserved in BC Archives (November 2, 1912 and Sept. 5, 1957 to June 23, 1984), Nanjing Library in China (the holding is: November 24, 1947 to October 31, 1948), and Library & Archives Canada (1957-1970).

Further publication history, selected articles, interviews of the last chief editor Mr. John Hsu can be found at the digital exhibition Glimpses into Chinese Immigration in Canada: The New Republic & World Journal Vancouver Newspapers.

== History ==
In the late 19th century, the Victoria Chinatown was one of the largest Chinese communities in North America. In 1899, Kang Youwei and his followers established the Chinese Empire Reform Association in Victoria and gained enormous financial and staff support from the local Chinese community. In August 1903, The Chinese Empire Reform Association published the Chinese Reform Gazette (日新報; 1903–1911) in Victoria. This may be the earliest Chinese newspaper in Canada.

Since then, various political groups from China contested for support from overseas Chinese populations, and newspapers were one of the best means to influence the local public. In January 1911, Sun Yet-sen came to Canada to raise funds for his anti-Qing uprisings in China. During this trip, he was warmly welcomed by the local Chinese communities especially the Chee Kong Tong (Later Chinese Freemasons). The Chee Kong Tong in Victoria mortgaged its building for $12,000. Adding the donations from Chee Kong Tong organizations in other Canadian cities and the local Chinese communities, Sun received about $40,000 from the Canadian Chinese community, which was the largest donation at the time. On April 27, the Second Guangzhou Uprising occurred in Guangzhou, China.

Possibly in 1911, Mr. Gao Yunshan (Chinese name: 高雲山; English name: Ko Bong) founded the New Republic newspaper in Victoria with his colleagues Li Tianmin (李天民; Walter Lee), Huang Bodu (黃伯度; Wong Bark Du). In 1912, the Kuomintang (KMT) or Chinese Nationalist Party was founded and the Canadian KMT branch reported to the San Francisco KMT headquarters. The New Republic became the Canadian KMT party's newspaper. The local key KMT members including Guan Baohua, Huang Bodu, Li Hanping, and Ma Jieduan (Chinese: 關寶華, 黃伯度, 李瀚屏, 馬傑端) were the earliest editors. Their written communication documents can be found at the Chinese KMT Archives at Taiwan. In 1915, Sun Yat-sen assigned Xia Chongmin (Chinese: 夏重民) to Canada. When Yuan Shikai restored the monarchy in China, following Sun Yat-sen's order, Xia Chongmin formed the overseas Chinese Volunteer Regiment (Chinese: 華僑義勇團) and the Airforce Team (Chinese: 航空隊) to join the anti-Yuan revolutionaries. The two regiments were made of over 110 trained volunteers from the overseas Chinese community members and their adult children who were born outside of China.

After the Second Revolution, the KMT was dissolved and Sun established the Chinese Revolutionary Party (中華革命黨 Zhonghua geming dang) in Japan in 1914. However, the English name of KMT “the Chinese National League” was still used in North America in order to fulfill its fundraising purposes.

From 1915 to 1918, frequent debates and controversies arose between The New Republic and Tai Hon Kong Bo (also known as The Chinese Times). The latter was a newspaper of Vancouver's Chinese Freemasons organization (Chinese: 致公堂). The argumentative articles reflect the contradictory political opinions about the future of China after the Revolution of 1911 (Chinese: 辛亥革命). The New Republic was frequently monitored by the Chief Press Censor of Canada. In 1916, The New Republic editor Li Gongwu (Chinese: 李公武) and other Chinese National League members attacked the Chinese Consolidated Benevolent Association (CCBA, Chinese: 中華會館) officials. On September 1, 1918, a local Chinese Nationalist League member Wang Cang assassinated Tang Hualong (Chinese: 湯化龍). the former Minister of Internal Affairs of the Republican government, in Victoria's Chinatown. Not long after the assassination, the Chinese National League was banned by the Canadian government. However, The New Republic newspaper was not banned. In 1919, six KMT members including The New Republic's chief editor Chen Shuren (Chinese: 陳樹人) were arrested in Vancouver. The censorship of KMT party in Canada was ended in June 1919.

Since the Canadian Federal government introduced the Chinese Exclusion Act in 1923, the Chinese communities went through hardships, including the Depression in 1930s and the Sino-Japanese War. During the War, the families of many Canadian Chinese immigrants could not come to Canada and struggled to survive. After the war, Foon Sien Wong (Chinese: 黃文甫,) a UBC graduate who grew up at Cumberland, BC, worked as editorial staff of the New Republic Chinese Daily. In 1948, he became the president of CCBA in Vancouver, and for the following eleven years he lobbied the federal government to gradually equalize immigration rights for Chinese Canadians with their European counterparts.

In 1958, The New Republic moved from Victoria to Vancouver and continued publishing until 1984. The last chief editor was Mr. John Hsu (Chinese: 徐新漢), who also served as the chief editor of the World Journal from 1981 to 2002.

== Research value ==
The New Republic represents the perspective of the Kuomintang, one of the key players on the Chinese and Taiwan political stages over more than a century. As such, it is a valuable historical resource for any researcher interested in the influence of KMT on the overseas Chinese community in the past seventy years. The New Republic recorded not only the opinions and activities of Chinese Canadians in the key historical periods of the Republic China, the World Wars I and II, and Communist China, but also the history of local Chinese immigrant societies and their interactions with other ethnic groups in Canada.
