= The Windmill Herald =

The Windmill Herald was a newspaper for Dutch immigrants in Canada and the United States. It was published by the Vanderheide Publishing Co. Ltd. of Langley, British Columbia. It was printed in a tabloid newspaper format and appeared semimonthly.

The Windmill Herald brought a selection of news items from and about the Netherlands, mostly in the Dutch language, and about history, roots and identity in the English-language pull-out section, along with news and features about the Dutch in North America. The Windmill Herald covered a broad range of news, including government and politics, church news and sports. The Windmill, as it was commonly referred to by its readers, contained a full page of family news, listing births, deaths, marriages and engagements as submitted by its readers. The Windmill Herald regularly featured articles on the origin and meaning of Dutch surnames.

Originally appearing under the title 'Goed Nieuws' (Good News), The Windmill Herald was first published in Burnaby, British Columbia in 1958. The Windmill Herald's Central Canada edition was originally started as Hollandia News in Chatham-Kent, Ontario in 1954. The readership of The Windmill Herald in the United States was served by a USA edition. On June 11, 2012, the newspaper's final issue was published.
