= Trend Weekly (Canada) =

Chinese-language newspaper in Canada

Trend Weekly (Chinese: 閒情報) is a Chinese language ethnic weekly newspaper based out of Calgary, Alberta. It was founded in 2001 to serve the growing Chinese population in Western Canada.

Trend Weekly is owned by Trend Media Inc. (Calgary, Alberta), parent company of another weekly Chinese newspaper, Oriental Weekly. Its publisher is Danny Chan, 30+ years veteran of Chinese publishing in Canada.

Trend Weekly is available every Thursday from authorized vendors, free of charge. Its key contents include lifestyle news, consumer trends and local community news.

== See also ==
- List of newspapers in Canada
