= Oriental Weekly =

Chinese-language newspaper in Canada

Oriental Weekly (Chinese: 東方報) is a Chinese language ethnic weekly newspaper, based in Calgary, Alberta. It was founded in 1981 to serve the growing Chinese population in Western Canada. Oriental Weekly is owned by Trend Media, parent company of another weekly Chinese newspaper, Trend Weekly. Its publisher is Danny Chan, 30 years veteran of Chinese publishing in Canada.

Oriental Weekly is available every Thursday from authorized vendors, free of charge. Its key contents include community news, local news, and government news on federal, provincial and municipal levels.

== See also ==
- List of newspapers in Canada
