= CHRN =

Multilingual radio station in Montreal

- Montreal, Quebec; Canada
- Frequency: 1610 kHz
- Branding: Radio Humsafar

Programming
- Format: Multilingual

Ownership
- Owner: Radio Humsafar

History
- First air date: 2016

Technical information
- Class: C
- Power: 1,000 watts
- Transmitter coordinates: 45°26′52.08″N 73°39′29.88″W

Links
- Webcast: Listen Live
- Website: radiohumsafar.com

CHRN is a multilingual radio station which operates at 1610 kHz/AM in Montreal, Quebec, Canada. The station serves as a flagship for Radio Humsafar, an international radio network serving the South Asian diaspora. CHRN is Radio Humsafar's second radio station in the Greater Montreal area, as it also owns CJLV.

Radio Humsafar received approval for the station from the CRTC on May 16, 2014. The station will operate at 1610 kHz with a universal transmitter power of 1,000 watts. The 1610 frequency was previously occupied by CJWI from 2002 until 2009, when it relocated to 1410 kHz.

Radio Humsafar previously applied for a station on March 16, 2011, which would have broadcast at 1400 kHz with a power of 1,000 watts; this application was later withdrawn, for unknown reasons, though a station at this position would have been first-adjacent to CJWI at 1410 kHz, which would have created interference issues.

CHRN is one of only two full-power stations in North America to use the 1610 frequency, the other being CHHA; the frequency has been unused in Mexico since 2018 and is reserved in the United States for travelers' information stations.
