= Ang Peryodiko =

Canadian newspaper

Ang Peryodiko is a newspaper in Winnipeg, Manitoba, that serves Filipino Canadians of Western Canada. It is an offshoot of the Los Angeles-based newspaper of the same name, with which it shares editorials, alongside Winnipeg exclusives. It was founded in 2003 and is published thrice a month.

== See also ==
- List of newspapers in Canada
