= Tai Hon Kong Bo =

- Type: Daily newspaper
- Founded: 1906
- Ceased publication: 3 October 1992
- Headquarters: 1 E Pender St. Vancouver
- ISSN: 0837-3809
- Website: chinesetimes.lib.sfu.ca

The Tai Hon Kong Bo (Chinese: 大漢公報; Jyutping: daai6 hon3 gung1 bou3; pinyin: Dàhàn gōngbào), also known as The Chinese Times, or Da Han Gong Bao, was a Chinese language daily newspaper in Vancouver, British Columbia, Canada. It was established by the Chee Kung Tong in 1906 and ceased publication on 3 October 1992. The Chinese Times was part of an international network of Chinese-language newspapers run by the Chee Kung Tong, including the San Francisco Chinese Republic Journal (中華民 國公報, 公論晨報), the Honolulu Hon Mun Bo (漢民報), and the New York City Chinese Republic News (民國公報). The Chee Kung Tong of Toronto published a sister newspaper the Hung Chung She Po (洪鈡時報), also called The Chinese Times, from 1929 to 1956.

However, a research claims that the newspaper Wa-Ying Yat-Po (1906–1909) is not the predecessor of Tai Hon Kong Bo, and that the year of Tai Hon Kong Bo's creation is not 1906 but 1910.

On 3 October 1992, Tai Hon Kong Bo announced the suspension of its publication.

Tai Hon Kong Bo was the longest-running Chinese diaspora newspaper in Canada, and it acted as the commanding authority for Cantonese-speakers throughout North America. The newspaper's street announcements board was re-created in the 1923 Paper Trail exhibit at the Chinese Canadian Museum, featuring an image of office's neon sign.

== Notable people ==
- William Lore - Worked as a newspaperman before military service

== See also ==
- The New Republic
