= Russian Canadian Info =

Canadian periodical in Russian

Russian Canadian Info is one among numerous Canadian periodicals in the Russian language.

== History and profile ==
Russian Canadian Info was created as a small home-based business built by a family of immigrants from Saint Petersburg, Russia and had only 32 pages. The newspaper was founded in 1991. In 2009, it had around 56 pages of local, country and global information for Russian-speaking Canadians.

The periodical was published by Russian Infotrade Ltd. alongside another weekly newspaper, Gazeta Plus. It had a circulation of roughly 15,000 as of 2002; Boris Nusenbaum was the President, and Arkadii Tiurin was the chief editor. It is included in the National Library of Canada’s ethnic newspaper collection. Distribution was free within Toronto, while a fee was charged for readers outside the Greater Toronto Area.

In 2002, the newspaper published an article criticizing several Jewish Russian oligarchs and said that pogroms were bound to occur. This was criticized, leading the publication to issue an apology.

It has special arrangements with Canada Post to send it to subscribers throughout Canada and as far as British Columbia. The periodical is also sent to the United States.
