= CJMS (1040 AM) =

- Saint-Constant, Quebec; Canada
- Broadcast area: Greater Montreal
- Frequency: 1040 kHz
- Branding: 1040 AM, L'authentique

Programming
- Format: Country; talk

Ownership
- Owner: Groupe Médias Pam Inc.
- Sister stations: CJWI

History
- First air date: April 25, 1999
- Last air date: December 22, 2020

Technical information
- Class: B
- Power: 10 kW (day); 1.07 kW (night)
- Transmitter coordinates: 45°22′5″N 73°37′21″W

CJMS was a French language radio station located in Saint-Constant, Quebec, Canada, a suburb of Montreal.

It broadcast on 1040 kHz with a daytime power of 10,000 watts and a nighttime power of 5,000 watts as a class B station, using a directional antenna with the same directional pattern day and night to protect WHO in Des Moines, Iowa. It transmitted from the same site CKGM used when it was on 980 kHz near Autoroute 30 in Saint-Constant.

The station had a format which was part-time country music and part-time talk and infomercials. Despite promoting itself as a country-formatted station, it was generally viewed as a talk/infomercial station which aired country music in non-key times of the day.

== History ==
Initially, Michel Mathieu and André Turcôt wanted to obtain the frequency deserted by CJMS 1280, but the CRTC licensed this frequency to station CFMB, a multicultural radio station founded in Montreal in 1962.

In November 1997, they requested 1320 kHz, which belonged to CJSO of Sorel.

On September 28, 1998, Michel Mathieu, on behalf of a company to be incorporated, was approved for the frequency 1320 kHz, with a daytime power of 5,000 watts and a nighttime power of 3,000 watts.

In November 1998, because of the destructive effects of the ice storm of January 1998, which felled five of the six former CKGM transmission towers, Michel Mathieu and André Turcôt, who had to rebuild two towers and to be better served, returned to the CRTC to request the 1040 kHz, formerly occupied by CFZZ of Saint-Jean-sur-Richelieu, having already belonged to Michel Mathieu; the CRTC gave its response in March 1999.

First logo of CJMS.

On April 25, 1999, the anniversary of CJMS 1280, CJMS Country began broadcasting at the frequency 1040 kHz, with a daytime transmission power of 5,000 watts and a nighttime transmission power of 1,100 watts. The erection of a third tower would make it possible to increase the power, at night, from 1,100 to 3,000 watts.

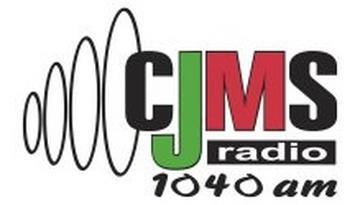
Logo of CJMS under Alexandre Azoulay's ownership.

In 2001, Michel Mathieu sold his 60% interest in CJMS to Alexandre Azoulay, through his company Communications Médialex Inc.

During a period of several years beginning in the early 2000s, CJMS had a history of chronic non-compliance of its license terms. Such violations have included failures to submit logger tapes, submit annual reports, meet French-language music quotas, provide a proper Canadian talent development contribution, broadcast local news, and provide a list of its musical selections.

On November 5, 2013, the CRTC summoned the station's owners to a hearing at its Gatineau headquarters to discuss its actions, due to the station's continual non-compliance. At the hearing, station owner Alexandre Azoulay claimed that the non-compliance was due to his father, who was suffering from dementia. He also mentioned that he was also in the process of selling CJMS to another broadcaster who owned one other station in the region, though he refused to say who that party was. The board then explained that the CRTC usually does not transfer or amend licenses of stations that were found out of compliance. Azoulay then agreed to provide documentation of the sale to the board within 24 hours after the hearing.

The CRTC could, within two months of the hearing, impose sanctions on the station, or even require that its license be suspended, not renewed, or cancelled. It could also decide whether or not to accept the sale, or to oblige the buyer to apply for a new license.

In September 2014, it was announced that Groupe Médias Pam Inc., owner of ethnic station CJWI 1410 AM, had plans to acquire the station; its decision would be given following a CRTC hearing on November 12, 2014 in Gatineau. Groupe Médias Pam planned on keeping the country format, although it intended on making the station more marketable to younger listeners, as well as planned to simulcast CJWI during drive-time periods. CJMS and CJWI both shared a broadcasting site at Saint-Constant; the sale would bring the property under a single owner.

On December 11, 2014, the sale was approved by the CRTC, which on that date the station was rebranded as 1040 AM, L'authentique. CJMS's license was also renewed through August 31, 2017 - a shorter term than usual, due to violations that were incurred under Azoulay's ownership.

On July 31, 2020, due to administrative failures, complaints that content from CJWI, whose programming primarily aimed at the Haitian community, was broadcast simultaneously at prime time on CJMS, and that the station continued to broadcast messages and promotions featuring the voice of a former host who had died two years previously, the CRTC denied the station's license renewal, mandating it to cease broadcasting on August 31, 2020.

On September 1, 2020 at midnight, CJMS ceased broadcasting at 1040 kHz; however, a few hours later, the station resumed broadcasting when Groupe Médias Pam was granted a stay to continue broadcasting until the case was heard on appeal. On September 10, 2020, at 5:29 pm, the station ceased broadcasting again, only to resume broadcasting once more on September 28, 2020.

Meanwhile the station launched an online streaming outlet named CJMS 2.0 with a country music format.

On December 22, 2020, CJMS 1040 AM went off the air again - this time, permanently. A three-judge panel of the Federal Court of Appeal dismissed an application by CJMS owner, Groupe Médias Pam Inc., for leave to appeal a decision by the CRTC that refused to renew the station's licence. Judges Marc Nadon, Richard Boivin and Marianne Rivoalen rejected the request by CJMS to overturn the decision and keep the station on the air.
