= CJSA-FM =

Multicultural radio station in Toronto

Coordinates: 43.7147°N 79.5834°W

- Toronto, Ontario; Canada
- Frequency: 101.3 MHz (HD Radio)
- Branding: CMR Diversity FM 101.3

Programming
- Format: Multilingual
- Subchannels: HD2: Tamil programming; HD3: Hindi/Urdu programming; HD4: Punjabi programming

Ownership
- Owner: Stanislaus Antony

History
- First air date: August 20, 2004

Technical information
- Licensing authority: CRTC
- Class: B1
- ERP: 373 watts (average); 850 watts (peak)
- HAAT: 283 metres (928 ft)

Links
- Website: www.cmr.fm

CJSA-FM, branded as CMR Diversity FM 101.3, is a Canadian radio station that broadcasts to the Greater Toronto Area, reaching a majority South-Asian audience.

CMR stands for "Canadian Multicultural Radio", as the station serves over 20 ethnic groups and broadcasts in more than 24 languages.

The station's programming primarily targets South-Asian communities, with programming in languages including Bengali, Gujarati, Hindi, Kannada, Konkani, Macedonian (Voice of Macedonia), Malayalam (Madhurageetham), Marathi, Nepali, Punjabi, Sinhalese, Somali, Tamil, Tagalog (FilTown Radio), Telugu (Morning Raaga), Tibetan, Twi, and Urdu (Radio Pakistan Toronto).

CJSA's studios are located on Rexdale Boulevard in Etobicoke, Toronto, Ontario, while its transmitter is located atop First Canadian Place.

== History ==
CJSA signed on in 2004, adopting a frequency formerly used by CHIN as a rebroadcaster to fill in reception gaps. CHIN's FM rebroadcaster now airs on 91.9 FM.

The station began its broadcast on August 20 that year from its facility in Scarborough, moving to its current facility in Etobicoke in late 2004.

The CJSA call sign also formerly belonged to a tourist information station in Sainte-Agathe-des-Monts, Quebec. Operated by the town's chamber of commerce, that station voluntarily surrendered its broadcast license in 2002. The former CJSA has no relation to the current CJSA-FM in Toronto.

In December 2013, CJSA signed on HD Radio operations. In a December 2012 letter to the CRTC, the station stated that it was interested in broadcasting up to 5 HD Radio subchannels, each of a different language for a different ethnic population (HD2 being Tamil, HD3 being Punjabi, HD4 being Hindi and Urdu, or "Aboriginal", and HD5 being data transmission).

On January 14, 2014, CMR launched one of Canada's first ever HD Radio broadcasts, with a 24-hour, Tamil-language program on their HD 2 subchannel. CJSA is the second Canadian radio station to use the technology, the first being CING-FM in Hamilton.
