= Kanadan Sanomat =

Finnish language newspaper in Canada

Kanadan Sanomat (KS)
- Type: Weekly newspaper
- Format: Tabloid
- Owner: Independent
- Publisher: Vapaa Sana Press Ltd.
- Editor: Ari Elo
- Founded: 2012 as a merger of Canadan Sanomat and Vapaa Sana
- Language: Finnish
- Headquarters: 191 Eglinton Avenue East, Toronto, Ontario, Canada
- Circulation: 1293 (approx.)
- Website: finnishcanadian.com

Kanadan Sanomat is a Canadian weekly Finnish language newspaper established in 2012 in Toronto, Ontario, Canada, as a merger between two earlier publications both owned by Vapaa Sana Press Ltd. It is also promoting the logo KS as a shortened name particularly for online promotion.

Kanadan Sanomat is a merger of two newspapers:

- Vapaa Sana published between 1931 and 2012 in Toronto, Ontario
- Canadan Sanomat published between 2001 and 2012 in Thunder Bay, Ontario, Canada

Kanadan Sanomat is considered a natural continuation of both papers and serves both Toronto and Thunder Bay readers that were earlier served by the two newspapers.

The new newspaper utilizes the K in the name Kanadan Sanomat referring to Canada with a K as customary in the Finnish language, rather than its predecessor Canadan Sanomat.
