= Vapaa Sana =

- Type: Weekly newspaper 1931-2012; Merged with Canadan Sanomat to form Kanadan Sanomat
- Format: Tabloid
- Owner(s): Vapaa Sana Press Ltd
- Founded: 1931
- Headquarters: Toronto, Ontario
- Price: $2.00 CAD single issue
- Website: www.vapaasana.com

Vapaa Sana was a Finnish-Canadian weekly newspaper located in Toronto, Ontario. Vapaa Sana was founded in 1931 and when closing in 2012 it was one of the oldest surviving newspapers that early Finnish immigrants founded in North America. By 1934 it had over 4000 subscribers and was the largest Finnish newspaper in North America.

Articles in Vapaa Sana were in the Finnish language, although a special English section called Finnish Canadian Reporter was published in most editions from 2006 until 2012.

The owner Vapaa Sana Press Ltd was also the publisher of the Canadan Sanomat newspaper in Thunder Bay. The company had purchased its Thunder Bay based competitor in 2004. The two papers continued parallel publishing until June 2012. From July 2012, the company merged the two papers into a weekly paper named Kanadan Sanomat. The last issue of Vapaa Sana was published on June 19, 2012.

In the 1930s, Vapaa Sana was a left-wing newspaper although more moderate than the then leading Finnish language newspaper in Canada Vapaus. The launch of Vapaa Sana was caused by the internal disagreements in the Finnish Organization of Canada, the publisher of Vapaus. After the war, Vapaa Sana became increasingly conservative in its coverage and attitudes. It was not until 2006 when the Finnish Organization of Canada was again included in the paper's list of Finnish activities in Canada. After the closing of Vapaus in 1990 the main competitor of Vapaa Sana was the Thunder Bay-based Finnish newspaper.

== Kanadan Sanomat ==
In April 2012, the owners Vapaa Sana Press Ltd. announced that their two newspapers, Vapaa Sana published in Toronto, and Canadan Sanomat published in Thunder Bay, would merge late during 2012. The new newspaper would be named Kanadan Sanomat, with the country spelled with a "K", as customary in the Finnish language.

== See also ==
- List of newspapers in Canada
