= CHHA (AM) =

Ethnic radio station in Toronto

- Toronto, Ontario; Canada
- Broadcast area: Greater Toronto Area
- Frequency: 1610 kHz
- Branding: La Voz de la Comunidad

Programming
- Format: Multilingual

Ownership
- Owner: San Lorenzo Latin American Community Centre

History
- First air date: November 25, 2004

Technical information
- Licensing authority: CRTC
- Class: C
- Power: 10,000 watts
- Transmitter coordinates: 43°38′33″N 79°20′22″W

Links
- Website: chha1610am.ca

CHHA is a Canadian AM radio station, broadcasting at 1610 kHz in Toronto, Ontario, Canada. Owned and operated by the San Lorenzo Latin American Community Centre, the station airs a Spanish language community radio format branded as Voces Latinas, along with some programming in English, Italian, Portuguese, Punjabi and Tagalog. CHHA's studios are located on Wenderly Drive in the Glen Park neighbourhood of Toronto, while its transmitter is located in the Port Lands neighbourhood at Toronto's waterfront. Its signal is pointed westward to protect CHRN in Montreal and travelers' information stations (TIS) in the United States. CHHA is the highest-powered station in North America to use the 1610 frequency, which is otherwise reserved for TIS in the U.S. and has been unused in Mexico since 2018.

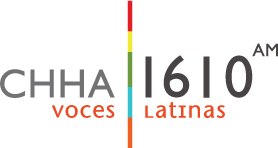
Voces Latinas logo

== History ==
The station was licensed by the Canadian Radio-television and Telecommunications Commission in 2003, and launched on November 25, 2004.

CHHA's licensing displaced the unprotected CHEV from the 1610 frequency.
