= Radio Humsafar =

South Asian radio network

Radio Humsafar is a radio network providing South-Asian programming to over 2 million listeners in several major cities around the world. Radio Humsafar's programming is broadcast in the United States, Canada, India, Australia, and over the internet worldwide.

It was launched in Montreal in July 2000 and is currently heard on radio stations across Canada, India, Australia, and the United States. The station broadcasts family-oriented programming with a mix of news, music, current issues, comedy shows, kids programs and talk shows 24 hours a day, 7 days a week. The evening talk show hosted by Jasvir Sandhu is currently its most popular program.

Radio Humsafar can also be heard via satellite in North America using a DVB receiver via Telesat Anik F1 satellite.

== Radio stations ==
Radio Humsafar owns Laval, Quebec-based radio station CJLV 1570 AM; that station carries a French-language full-service format, including oldies music, talk programs and news updates throughout the day.

On March 16, 2011, Radio Humsafar would pursue a second radio station in the Montreal area when it applied with the CRTC to operate a terrestrial ethnic radio station in Montreal, which would have operated at 1400 kHz with a universal transmitter power of 1,000 watts. On May 10, 2011, the application was withdrawn, for unknown reasons. Radio Humsafar would reapply again, this time at 1610 kHz, also broadcasting at 1,000 watts at all times; this application was approved by the CRTC on May 16, 2014. This station, whose call letters will be CHRN, will serve as a flagship for the Radio Humsafar network.

On October 21, 2015, Radio Humsafar received a license for a new radio station in the Toronto suburb of Brampton, Ontario, CIRF, broadcasting on 1350 kHz.
