= Asian Pacific Post =

Canadian newspaper in British Columbia

- Type: Weekly newspaper
- Founded: 1993; 33 years ago
- Language: English
- Headquarters: Vancouver, British Columbia; Canada
- ISSN: 1916-4432
- Website: asianpacificpost.com

The Asian Pacific Post is a weekly Canadian newspaper founded in 1993 in Vancouver, British Columbia. The newspaper specialized in reporting Asian issues, and has a readership of 160,000. It has a sister publication in The South Asian Post.

The newspaper won a Jack Webster Award for Excellence in Journalism for Best Community Reporting in 2003.

== Conflict with the Epoch Press ==
According to the Asian Pacific Post, Frank Cui of the Epoch Printing Press, which also prints The Epoch Times, attempted to stop the printing of the paper on January 8, 2009. This was due to the printing of an article which stated that the Chinese government accused the Divine Performing Arts hosted by NTDTV of being funded by Falun Gong practitioners. Cui refused to print the newspaper without the removal of quotes from Chinese officials. Publisher Sewak accused Falun Gong of suppressing his freedom of speech, and the Asian Pacific Post was forced to switch publishers.

Epoch Press' president, Frank Cui, who is a Falun Gong practitioner, admitted to holding the paper. He said "...news reporters feel that they must 'balance' stories about Falun Gong or events they are involved in by adding the bad words or opinions from the [ Chinese Communist Party ], but in my feeling, between victim and perpetrator there can never be any neutrality or balance." Harbinder Singh Sewak, publisher of the Post, said "This is hypocrisy in slow motion... You can't complain about not having freedom of the press in China and then turn around and suppress the same freedoms in Canada". Sewak alleges the printer committed unlawful interference with economic interests, including breach of contract and deceit. Lawyers representing Falun Dafa denied any association with the actions of Frank Cui.

This story has been covered by the South China Morning Post, The Vancouver Sun, and The Province. Sewak has since taken the Epoch Printing Press to court over the matter The lawyer representing the Asian Pacific Post states that the case is unique in Canada. "We have yet to find a case anywhere in Canada which would be similar to this - a commercial printer holding a newspaper hostage on the basis they don't like an article is a pretty strange set of facts.

== See also ==
- List of newspapers in Canada
