= CIRF =

- Brampton, Ontario; Canada
- Broadcast area: Greater Toronto Area
- Frequency: 1350 kHz (AM)

Programming
- Format: Multilingual - South Asian

Ownership
- Owner: Radio Humsafar

History
- First air date: 2020

Technical information
- Power: 1,000 watts (day); 40 watts (night)

Links
- Website: radiohumsafar.com

CIRF (1350 kHz) is a commercial AM radio station licensed to Brampton, Ontario, Canada, serving Greater Toronto. It is owned by Radio Humsafar and broadcasts a multilingual ethnic format, mostly in South Asian languages including in Punjabi.

By day, CIRF transmits 1,000 watts using a non-directional antenna. At night, to avoid interference to other radio stations on 1350 AM, it reduces power to 40 watts. The transmitter is on Atlantic Drive near East Britannia Road in Mississauga.

== History ==
On October 21, 2015, the CRTC approved Radio Humsafar's application to operate a new ethnic commercial AM radio station in Brampton on the frequency of 1350 kHz.

Prior to the station’s sign on, the original call sign was to be CFKA but it changed to its current call sign when it went on the air. The station also had a number of technical issues before it could begin broadcasts.

The station began testing in December 2019 and signed on the air a few months later in 2020.
