= CJRP =

Former radio station in Quebec City, Quebec

- Quebec City, Quebec; Canada
- Frequency: 1060 kHz

Programming
- Format: Oldies/news/talk

Ownership
- Owner: Radiomutuel

History
- First air date: October 24, 1959
- Former call signs: CJLR (1959–1969)
- Call sign meaning: Radio Provinciale

Technical information
- Class: B
- Power: 50,000 watts (daytime); 10,000 watts (nighttime)

CJRP was a French-language Canadian radio station located in Quebec City, Quebec. It operated from 1959 to 1994.

The station broadcast on 1060 kHz, using a daytime power of 50,000 watts and a nighttime power of 10,000 watts as a class B station, using a directional antenna with different patterns day and night to protect KYW in Philadelphia, Pennsylvania.

CJRP was originally known as CJLR and went on the air as an independent station owned by Jacques La Roche (hence the call sign) on October 24, 1959. It originally had a power of 5,000 watts full-time and used a single directional pattern at all times. Power was increased to 10,000 watts full-time in 1962.

In 1969, the station was bought by Raymond Crépault, who already owned CJMS in Montreal. CJLR's call sign was changed to CJRP (with the "RP" standing for "Radio Provinciale") and the station became a part of the Radiomutuel network.

In 1977, the station increased its daytime power to 50,000 watts, using a different directional pattern than the one now used only at night.

CJRP's Top 40 format was abandoned in favour of oldies mixing news/talk in the early 1980s. On July 29, 1982, a sister station, CHIK-FM, went on the air.

On September 30, 1994, it was announced that Telemedia and Radiomutuel would immediately merge their respective AM news/talk network into the new Radiomédia network. In each of the six markets where the two networks competed, the station which had the best signal remained on-air, and the other one was closed. As local rival CHRC had a much better signal (50,000 watts all day), CJRP had to cease its operations on that day.

The station's licence was revoked by the Canadian Radio-television and Telecommunications Commission (CRTC) on November 2, 1994.
