= CJMS (1280 AM) =

- Montreal, Quebec; Canada
- Broadcast area: Greater Montreal
- Frequency: 1280 kHz

Programming
- Format: Top 40, then news/talk

Ownership
- Owner: Radiomutuel

History
- First air date: April 25, 1954
- Last air date: September 30, 1994
- Call sign meaning: Je me souviens, official motto of Quebec

Technical information
- Class: B
- ERP: 50,000 watts

CJMS was a French language radio station located in Montreal, Quebec, Canada.

It broadcast on 1280 kHz with a power of 50,000 watts.

== History ==
Logo of CJMS in the 1970s

The station went on the air on April 25, 1954. CJMS got an FM sister station in 1964 as CJMS-FM (later CKMF-FM) began operations. The AM station adopted a highly popular Top 40 format in the 1960s and became the flagship of the (now-defunct) Radiomutuel network in 1969. The Top 40 format remained popular until the late 1970s, but it started to lose listeners rapidly in the early 1980s due to the increasing availability and popularity of FM radio.

Logo of CJMS in the 1980s

CJMS, along with other Radiomutuel stations, switched to a news/talk format in the early 1980s, which resulted in Quebec having two separate popular AM news/talk networks covering most of the province (the other one being Telemedia, whose flagship was competitor CKAC). For various reasons, including the prolonged economic recession, the licensing of Télévision Quatre Saisons (TQS) in 1986 which persisted in their practice of selling advertising for extremely low fees, the presence of a third French-language news/talk station in Montreal (CKVL) and a general migration of listeners from AM to FM, both networks had less-than-stellar financial performances.

Telemedia and Radiomutuel secretly decided to merge their operations to form the Radiomédia network in June 1994. While both AM networks were losing money overall, Raynald Brière (then general manager of CJMS and vice-president of the Radiomutuel network) admitted in a 2006 interview that both CJMS and CKAC were profitable, with the latter being slightly more profitable, although the profit margins of both stations were low.

The merger deal was publicly announced on Friday, September 30, 1994 at 9:15 AM, and in each of the six markets where the two networks competed, programming on the station slated to be closed immediately stopped and was replaced with continuous music fed directly at the transmitter site. The music continued until 6 PM, when all six stations targeted shut down. The last song played on CJMS was Michel Fugain's "Tout va changer" ("Everything will change").

In every market the station that had a strong signal was kept, and even though CJMS 1280 had a full-time 50,000-watt signal, it got replaced by the CKAC's clear-channel status on a lower frequency (730 kHz). Thus CJMS became one of the very few 50,000-watt AM giants to shut down in North America's radio broadcasting history.

As most of CKAC's new programming was actually composed of shows, hosts and journalists previously heard on CJMS, it led some critics to nickname CKAC as "CJMS 730" or "Le CJMS renouvelé à la fréquence 730" ("The rejuvenated CJMS at 730 on the radio dial"), and some pre-1994 CKAC fans still claim today that it is CKAC which actually really died in 1994.

From 1999 to 2020, there was a new station using the call sign CJMS 1040 in the Montreal area; however, it had no links whatsoever with the old CJMS. While that new station initially tried to get permission to broadcast on 1280 kHz (hence their choice of call letters CJMS), they were denied that frequency as the old CJMS owners had chosen to sell their transmitter site to multilingual station CFMB, which applied successfully to move from 1410 kHz to 1280 kHz.

== Trivia ==
- CJMS was the world's first French-language station to broadcast in AM stereo. The station used the C-QUAM system, starting in June 1983, until it ceased operations.
