= Media in Sherbrooke =

This is a list of media in Sherbrooke, Quebec.

== Radio ==
FM stations

Frequency	Call sign	Branding	Format	Owner	Notes
FM 88.1	CFPP-FM		Christian radio	Fabrique Notre-Dame du Perpétuel-Secours	French; unlicensed station
FM 88.3	CFAK-FM	CFAK 88,3	Campus radio	Université de Sherbrooke	French
FM 88.9	CJMQ-FM	CJMQ 88.9	Community radio	Bishop's University	English
FM 89.7	CBM-FM-1	CBC Music	Public music	Canadian Broadcasting Corporation	English
FM 90.7	CBFX-FM-2	Ici Musique	Public music	Société Radio-Canada	French
FM 91.7	CBMB-FM	CBC Radio One	Public news/talk	Canadian Broadcasting Corporation	English
FM 93.7	CFGE-FM	Rythme FM	Adult contemporary	Cogeco	French
FM 95.5	CFLX-FM	CFLX FM 95,5	Community radio	Radio communautaire de l'Estrie	French
FM 100.3	CIRA-FM-1	Radio Ville-Marie	Christian radio	Radio Ville-Marie	French
FM 101.1	CBF-FM-10	Ici Radio-Canada Première	Public news/talk	Société Radio-Canada	French
FM 102.7	CITE-FM-1	Rouge FM	Adult contemporary	Bell Media Radio	French
FM 106.1	CIMO-FM	Énergie	Mainstream rock	Bell Media Radio	French
FM 107.7	CKOY-FM	107,7	Talk radio/Sports/Rock	Cogeco	French

Internet radio stations

Frequency	Branding	Format	Owner	Notes
Internet only	Ici Musique Classique	Classical radio	Société Radio-Canada	Rebroadcasting from Montreal, Serving provincial wide
Internet only	Ici Musique Rock	Rock	Société Radio-Canada	Rebroadcasting from Montreal, Serving provincial wide
Internet only	Ici Musique Hip-Hop	Urban contemporary	Société Radio-Canada	Rebroadcasting from Montreal, Serving provincial wide
Internet only	Ici Musique atmosphère	Ambient music	Société Radio-Canada	Rebroadcasting from Montreal, Serving provincial wide
Internet only	Qub Radio	Talk radio	Quebecor Media	Rebroadcasting from Montreal, Serving provincial wide

Some radio stations from other areas of Estrie, as well as Montreal and the United States, can also be heard in Sherbrooke. Examples include CKGM 690 AM, CKAC 730 AM, CKOI-FM 96.9, WMOO 92.1 FM, WHOM 94.9 FM and WPKQ 103.7 FM.

== Television ==
Sherbrooke's broadcast television stations are transmitted from nearby Orford.

OTA virtual channel (PSIP)	Actual channel	Call sign	Network	Notes
7.1	7 (VHF)	CHLT-DT	TVA	
9.1	9 (VHF)	CKSH-DT	Ici Radio-Canada Télé	
11.1	11 (VHF)	CKMI-DT-2	Global	Rebroadcaster of CKMI-DT-1 (Montreal); only English-language over-the-air station
24.1	24 (UHF)	CIVS-DT	Télé-Québec	Rebroadcaster of CIVM-DT (Montreal)
30.1	30 (UHF)	CFKS-DT	Noovo	De facto rebroadcaster of CFJP-DT (Montreal)

== Newspapers ==
The daily newspapers are La Tribune and The Record. Voir, a cultural magazine, also publishes a regional edition on Thursdays. Also, a student newspaper, Le Collectif, is published at the Université de Sherbrooke.
