= CJTS-FM =

Radio station in Sherbrooke (2004–2011)

- Sherbrooke, Quebec; Canada
- Broadcast area: Estrie
- Frequency: 104.5 MHz
- Branding: Souvenirs Garantis

Programming
- Format: Defunct (was Classic Hits)

Ownership
- Owner: Cogeco; (Radio Sherbrooke, Inc.)

History
- First air date: May 31, 2004
- Last air date: December 6, 2011
- Former call signs: CIGR-FM (2004–2008); CKOY-FM (2008–2011)

Technical information
- Class: C1
- ERP: 50,000 watts

CJTS-FM was a French-language Canadian radio station located in Sherbrooke, Quebec.

Owned and operated by Cogeco, it broadcast on 104.5 MHz using a directional antenna with an average effective radiated power of 9,200 watts and a peak effective radiated power of 50,000 watts (class C1). The station's transmitter was located at Mount Bellevue.

== History ==
The station was licensed by the Canadian Radio-television and Telecommunications Commission in 2003, and went on the air on May 31, 2004. It was originally owned by local broadcaster Groupe Génération Rock, and had the call sign CIGR-FM.

CKOY's first logo, 2008-2009.

CKOY's last logo as a CKOI station, 2009-2011.

On June 18, 2007, CIGR's owners announced a tentative deal to sell the station to Corus Entertainment. The transaction was approved by the CRTC in December 2007, and was completed as of January 28, 2008. Under Corus' ownership, the station then adopted the CKOY-FM call sign (Originally used by CIWW from 1949-1985), which is a disambiguation of its sister station in Montreal, CKOI-FM. Since 2009, the station began to use the CKOI calls in its promotions for branding purposes, as CKOI Estrie, though its legal calls remained CKOY-FM. It also changed its format to hot adult contemporary at the time.

On May 9, 2009, due to signal deficiencies, the station was given CRTC approval to authorized to increase its effective radiated power from 1,300 watts to 9,200 watts and increase its peak effective radiated power to 50,000 watts, increasing the effective antenna height and relocating the antenna to the Mount Bellevue, in Sherbrooke. Since the relocating, the station has (unlike competitors CITE-FM-1 and CIMO-FM) good coverage in the city of Sherbrooke.

On April 30, 2010, Cogeco announced it would purchase Corus Quebec's radio stations, including CKOY-FM. Cogeco already owned CFGE-FM in Sherbrooke and would also acquire CHLT-FM from Corus; keeping all three stations would have put Cogeco in excess of ownership limits for the Sherbrooke market. The company proposed to convert CKOY to a repeater of Montreal's CKAC, which was also part of the Corus transaction. On December 17, 2010, the CRTC approved the sale of most of Corus' radio stations in Quebec to Cogeco, on condition that CKOY be resold to another party by December 2011, and placed in a blind trust in the interim.

On February 1, 2011, Cogeco swapped the music formats on 104.5 FM and 107.7 FM, and changed the call letters to CJTS-FM. CJTS assumed the Souvenirs Garantis Classic hits format that was previously aired on CHLT 107.7; that station assumed the CKOY-FM callsign and the CKOI branding and hot adult contemporary format.

On December 6, 2011, the station ceased operations at noon, in compliance with the conditions set forth by the sale of the station to Cogeco, as Cogeco was unable to find a buyer for the station by the deadline. At the request of Cogeco, the CRTC cancelled the license for CJTS-FM on December 22, 2011.
