= CKOF-FM =

Coordinates: 45°30′57″N 75°39′29″W

- Gatineau, Quebec; Canada
- Broadcast area: National Capital Region; Eastern Ontario; Outaouais
- Frequency: 104.7 MHz
- Branding: 104,7 Outaouais

Programming
- Language: French
- Format: Talk radio/Sports/Rock
- Affiliations: Ottawa Senators; Ottawa RedBlacks; Gatineau Olympiques

Ownership
- Owner: Cogeco; (591991 B.C. Ltd.)

History
- First air date: June 3, 1968
- Former call signs: CJRC (1968–2011)
- Former frequencies: 1150 kHz (1968–2006)
- Call sign meaning: disambiguation of sister station CKOI-FM

Technical information
- Class: C1
- ERP: 31,000 watts average; 100,000 watts peak
- HAAT: 41.5 meters (136 ft)

Links
- Website: www.fm1047.ca

CKOF-FM (104.7 MHz) is a French-language commercial radio station in Gatineau, Quebec, Canada, serving the National Capital Region including Ottawa. Owned and operated by Cogeco, it broadcasts a talk radio format, calling itself "104,7 FM". Some programming is shared with CHMP-FM, a sister station in Montreal. The radio studios and offices are in the Chemin des Terres neighbourhood of Gatineau.

CKOF-FM has an effective radiated power (ERP) of 31,000 watts, with a maximum of 100,000 watts. The transmitter is located in Camp Fortune, near Gatineau Park.

== History ==
The station originally began broadcasting in 1968 on the AM band. It was CJRC, on 1150 kHz with a daytime power of 50,000 watts and a nighttime power of 5,000 watts as a class B station. It used a directional antenna with slightly different daytime and nighttime directional patterns in order to protect various other stations on that frequency – particularly CKOC in Hamilton, Ontario.

The station was signed on the air on June 3, 1968 by Raymond Crepeau, Marcel Joyal, Robert Campeau and Gerard Moreau with the presence of Pierre Elliott Trudeau, the then-prime minister of Canada (and father of future prime minister Justin Trudeau) as part of the Radiomutuel network. Originally its headquarters were at the Sparks Street Mall in Ottawa but were later moved in the old city of Gatineau in the 1980s after a stay on Belfast Road in Ottawa. It became part of the Radiomédia network (later known as Corus Québec) on September 30, 1994, after Radiomutuel merged with Télémédia (that network's Gatineau station, CKCH, was closed down).

On November 24, 2006, the CRTC authorized the station to switch to the FM band. The change of frequency forced CHMY's transmitter in Arnprior, formerly on 104.7, to move to 107.7 FM. The 104.7 MHz frequency was also used in Ottawa by 3077457 Nova Scotia Limited which was approved in 2005 to operate a tourist information station. The station, CIIO-FM later moved to 99.7 MHz in 2007.

On April 16, 2007, at 7:00 a.m. EDT, CJRC made the move to the FM band on 104.7 MHz as CJRC-FM Le FM parlé de l'Outaouais.

On June 12, 2008, CJRC-FM received approval to increase power from 2,900 to 36,000 watts.

In March 2009, Corus announced plans to drop the talk radio format on CJRC, CHLT-FM in Sherbrooke, CHLN-FM in Trois-Rivières and CKRS-FM in Saguenay, in favour of a classic hits-oldies format branded as "Souvenirs Garantis", effective on March 28, 2009.

Since the implementation of the new CJRC-FM on 104.7 in 2007, the old 1150 AM simulcast the programming of CJRC-FM which was originally to be shut down on March 16, 2009, although as of April 2009, the 1150 AM signal was still in operation. The old AM 1150 CJRC signal finally left the air on May 1, 2009.

Logo as "CKOI 104.7", 2011-2012

In early 2010, the local morning news show featuring Louis-Philippe Brûlé (previously before for several years by Daniel Séguin) was removed in favor of a provincial newscast broadcast from Montreal by Paul Arcand.

On December 17, 2010, the CRTC approved the sale of most of Corus Entertainment stations in Quebec, including CJRC-FM, to Cogeco.

On February 21, 2011, the station rebranded to "CKOI 104.7", picking up the hot adult contemporary format and branding similar to its Montreal sister station, CKOI-FM. CJRC-FM changed its callsign to CKOF-FM.

On June 20, 2012, Cogeco announced that CKOF-FM, along with CKOY-FM and CKOB-FM, would revert to their talk formats on August 20, 2012, all but dismantling the CKOI network. Apart from an expansion of talk programming, no changes in existing talk and sports programming were expected for these stations.
