= CILM-FM =

Radio station in Saguenay, Quebec

Coordinates: 48°25′29″N 71°06′30″W

- Saguenay, Quebec; Canada
- Broadcast area: Saguenay–Lac-Saint-Jean
- Frequency: 98.3 MHz
- Branding: Rythme 98,3

Programming
- Language: French
- Format: Adult contemporary
- Affiliations: Rythme FM

Ownership
- Owner: Cogeco

History
- First air date: June 24, 1947
- Former call signs: CKRS (1947–2007); CKRS-FM (2007–2015)
- Former frequencies: 1240 kHz (1947–1952); 590 kHz (1952–2007)

Technical information
- Class: C1
- ERP: 63,000 watts; 100,000 watts Max
- HAAT: 107.4 metres (352 ft)

Links
- Website: saguenay.rythmefm.com

CILM-FM is a French-language Canadian radio station located in Saguenay, Quebec. The station carries adult contemporary format as part of the Rythme FM network.

Owned by Cogeco, it broadcasts on 98.3 MHz using a directional antenna with an average effective radiated power of 51,000 watts and a peak effective radiated power of 100,000 watts (class C1). The station broadcasts from the CBC Tower on Warren Street in Chicoutimi.

== History ==
CKRS originally went on the air at 1240 kHz on AM band on June 24, 1947. In 1952, CKRS changed frequencies from 1240 kHz to 590 kHz.

CKRS remained at 590 kHz on the AM band on 590 with a daytime power of 25,000 watts and a nighttime power of 7,500 watts as a class B station, using a directional antenna with slightly different daytime and nighttime directional patterns in order to protect various other stations on that frequency. On November 24, 2006, 591991 B.C. Ltd., a wholly owned subsidiary of Corus Entertainment Inc. received approval from the Canadian Radio-television and Telecommunications Commission (CRTC) to convert CKRS from the AM band (590 kHz) to the FM band at 98.3 MHz. CKRS moved to 98.3 FM in 2007.

It was previously part of the Corus Québec (formerly Radiomédia) network which operates across Quebec. In March 2009, Corus announced plans to drop the talk format on CKRS, CJRC-FM in Gatineau, CHLN-FM in Trois-Rivières and CHLT-FM in Sherbrooke in favour of a hybrid talk / classic hits-oldies format branded as "Souvenirs Garantis", effective March 28, 2009.

In early 2010, the local morning news show featuring Myriam Ségal (previously before for several years by Louis Champagne) was removed in favor of Puisqu'il faut se lever, a province-wide news and discussion program from CHMP-FM in Montreal, hosted by Paul Arcand. Puisqu'il faut se lever was dumped by CKRS-FM a year later, in February 2011, and the station returned to a local morning news show.

On June 25, 2010 it was reported that Corus has agreed to sell CKRS-FM to a local business group known as Radio Saguenay, whose owners include former NHL player and coach Guy Carbonneau. The acquisition received CRTC approval on March 1, 2011. However, the commission has approved the transfer of the station's management to Radio Saguenay on an interim basis; the station would be rebranded as "FM 98", but maintaining its classic hits format. The sale to Radio Saguenay was fully approved in November 2010.

In March 2011, CKRS-FM changed its music content from classic hits to mainstream rock, while retaining its talk programming. The station's playlist, however, was heavy on classic rock.

In 2012, the station was sold to Attraction Radio, and was rebranded as "CKRS 98,3". Its music and talk programming continued, though at this point, most of its talk programs are networked from Cogeco.

In May 2014, CKRS filed an application with the CRTC, which would amend its licence to reduce spoken word requirements and enable them to carry more music-based programming, a necessity, as CKRS is seeking to affiliate with Rythme FM. The license amendment would allow CKRS to carry 50 hours of local programming a week and six hours and five minutes of local news each week, with the remainder programmed from Rythme FM. CKRS announced the plans and license change, as ratings have shown that CKRS was one of the market's lowest-rated radio stations, with only 5% of the commercial market share, with competing rock station CKYK-FM commanding a 24% share. The application was approved by the CRTC on November 26, 2014; the amendment includes its minimum local "spoken word" requirement reduced to 21 hours a week. Following the approval, it was announced that CKRS-FM and sister station CKGS-FM would join the Rythme FM network starting February 9, 2015, changing callsign to CILM-FM.

In August 2018, Attraction Radio abandoned the Rythme FM network affiliation for an in-house branding "O". CKGS-FM would break the simulcast of CILM-FM on September 17, 2019, when it adopted the Country-Western format as Hit Country 105,5, with CILM-FM retaining the adult contemporary format.

Cogeco would acquire CILM-FM from Arsenal Media (the renamed Attraction Radio) on April 25, 2022, this acquisition reunited CILM with the Corus Quebec owned stations that are now owned by Cogeco and the Rythme FM owned and operated stations, this acquisition also reintroduced the Rythme FM branding in Saguenay soon after.
