= CHRL-FM =

Radio station in Roberval, Quebec

Coordinates: 48°24′05″N 72°05′21″W

Roberval, Quebec; Canada
- Frequency: 99.5 MHz
- Branding: Planète 99,5

Programming
- Format: Adult contemporary

Ownership
- Owner: Cogeco
- Sister stations: CFGT-FM, CHVD-FM, CKXO-FM, CKYK-FM

History
- First air date: 1949
- Former frequencies: 1340 kHz (1949–1953); 910 kHz (1953–2001)
- Call sign meaning: Roberval

Technical information
- Class: B
- ERP: 50,000 watts

Links
- Website: www.roberval.planeteradio.ca

CHRL-FM is a French-language Canadian radio station located in Roberval, Quebec.

Owned and operated by Cogeco following its 2018 acquisition of most of the stations formerly owned by RNC Media, it broadcasts on 99.5 MHz using a directional antenna with an average effective radiated power of 15,031 watts and a peak effective radiated power of 50,000 watts (class B).

The station has an adult contemporary music format branded as Planète 99,5.

== Station history ==
CHRL was launched as an AM radio station, broadcasting on 1340 kHz, in 1949. In 1953, CHRL changed frequencies from 1340 kHz to 910 kHz. It received the authorization from the Canadian Radio-television and Telecommunications Commission in September 2001 to convert to its current 99.5 FM frequency, and shut down the AM transmitter a few months later in 2002.
