= CKOI =

CKOI may refer to:

- CKOI-FM, a radio station (96.9) licensed to Montreal, Quebec, Canada
- CKOI (network), a defunct network of radio stations in Quebec based at CKOI-FM
