= CKAC =

Traffic information radio station in Montreal

- Montreal, Quebec; Canada
- Broadcast area: Greater Montreal
- Frequency: 730 kHz
- Branding: Radio Circulation 730

Programming
- Language: French
- Format: Traffic information

Ownership
- Owner: Cogeco; (591991 B.C. Ltd.)
- Sister stations: CHMP-FM; CKOI-FM; CFGL-FM; CKBE-FM

History
- First air date: September 27, 1922
- Call sign meaning: Canadien-Kilocycle-Amérique-Canada

Technical information
- Licensing authority: CRTC
- Class: A
- Power: 50,000 watts
- Transmitter coordinates: 45.5139°N 73.9733°W

Links
- Webcast: Listen live
- Website: www.radiocirculation.net

CKAC is a French-language radio station located in Montreal, Quebec, Canada. Owned by Cogeco, the station operates as a commercial traffic information service branded as Radio Circulation 730. Its studios are located at Place Bonaventure in Downtown Montreal, and its transmitter is located in Saint-Joseph-du-Lac.

CKAC was officially launched on October 2, 1922, under the ownership of the local newspaper La Presse, as the first ever Francophone radio station in North America. CKAC had historically been a dominant station in its early years, with its listenership fuelled by popular programming such as a Sunday church broadcast, news coverage, as well as its broadcast rights to the Montreal Expos of Major League Baseball. In 1968, the station and La Presse was acquired by the Power Corporation of Canada, and CKAC was in turn sold to Telemedia the following year, becoming the flagship of a provincial network of stations.

By the 1990s, the station had begun to lose its dominance due to competing stations and other factors, resulting in a decision by Telemedia to merge its radio network with competing chain Radiomutuel as Radiomédia, and CKAC becoming a joint venture of the two owners. Radiomutuel's CJMS was shut down, and much of its programming and personalities were moved to CKAC. In 2001, Radiomutuel's successor, Astral Media, announced its intent to acquire the remainder of the Radiomédia network and CKAC. However, the acquisition was blocked by the Competition Bureau, resulting in the stations instead being sold in 2004, to Corus Entertainment as part of a larger exchange of assets between the two companies. CKAC became the flagship and provider of talk radio programming to the Corus Québec network, but its newsroom was later shut down in favor of that of its new sister station CINF (later CHMP-FM). In 2007, the station flipped to a sports radio format.

In 2010, Corus sold all of its Quebec radio stations to Cogeco. The following September, CKAC dropped its sports format and switched to traffic information programming, broadcasting live traffic reports for the Montreal area throughout the day.

== Previous hosts ==
Previous hosts on the station included: Michel Langevin and Gabriel Grégoire (morning show), Mario Langlois (mid-mornings), Jean-Charles Lajoie (early afternoons), Michel Villeneuve (afternoon drive), Jean Chartrand (early evenings), Ron Fournier (late evenings), Marc Bryson (weekends) and Jacques Fabi (weeknights).

== History ==
=== Early days ===
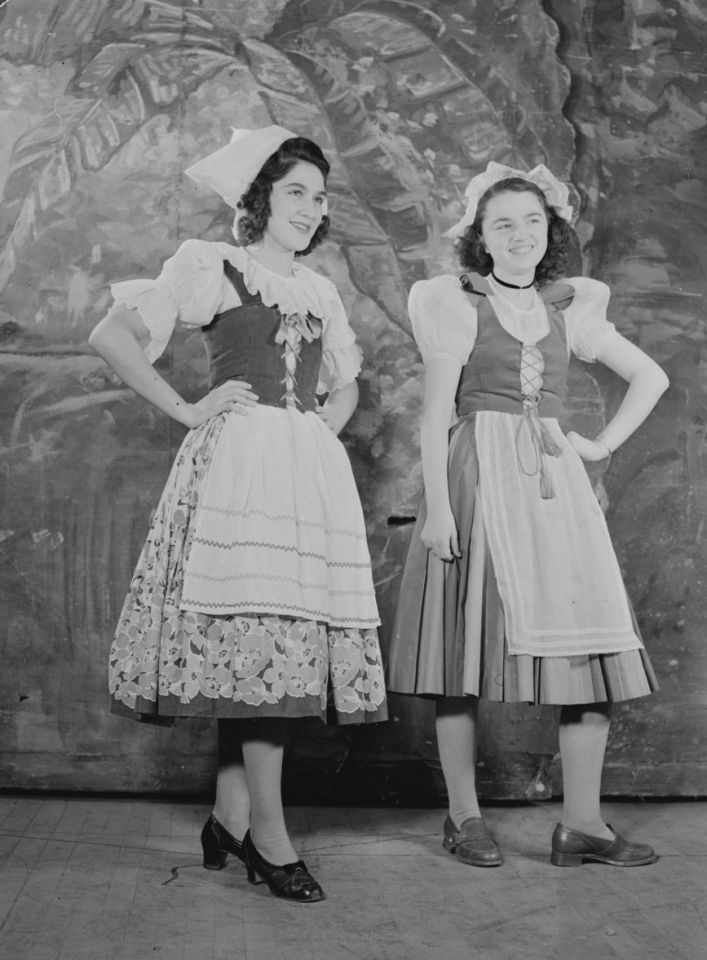
Recording of «Radio Petit Monde» in 1943

The construction of CKAC was announced on May 3, 1922, by daily newspaper La Presse, which created the station and owned it until 1969. On-air testing began by mid-September 1922, and the station was officially inaugurated on October 2, although regular programming had already begun on September 27. CKAC was the first francophone radio station in North America.

CKAC was broadcasting on 730 kHz right from the start, but it originally shared the frequency with CFCF (later CINW) and CHYC until 1929, at which point CKAC became the only station on that frequency. Power was increased to 5,000 watts (full-time) on October 19, 1929, using a new transmitter site located in Saint-Hyacinthe. CKAC applied to increase its power to 50,000 watts the following year, but this application was denied by government authorities.

The station became an affiliate of the CBS network in 1929. This affiliation was established to broadcast concerts from renowned American orchestras on CKAC. CKAC also created its own orchestra that year, which would produce concerts aired on American stations twice a week until 1933. (CKAC did keep its CBS affiliation until the late 1940s).

Radio dramas appeared on CKAC in 1931, and would continue to be heard for many years thereafter, until they were phased out as television was introduced and became popular.

=== Golden age ===
In 1950, CKAC increased its daytime power to 10,000 watts (nighttime power remained at 5,000 watts), and the station began to broadcast 24 hours a day.

On October 1 of that same year, CKAC began to air the "Le Chapelet en famille" (the "Family Rosary Hour") as recited by archbishop Paul-Emile Léger in the Marie-Reine-du-Monde Cathedral, and this program proved so popular that competitors actually lobbied hard to get permission to simulcast that program, to no avail. (The program disappeared in 1970, as religious practice declined precipitously in the late 1960s, in Montreal and elsewhere in Quebec and ratings were down, but this provoked many complaints among still-devout Catholics).

On March 13, 1958, CKAC raised its power to 50,000 watts full-time, using a directional antenna pointing east using two towers, as it moved to its current transmitter site located in Saint-Joseph-du-Lac, just west of the Island of Montreal. The station now had one of the best signals in Eastern Canada, which was quite an exceptional situation for a privately owned station. In the early days of radio in Canada, the CBC used its dual role as regulator and broadcaster to ensure that most of the country's clear-channel allocations went to CBC-owned stations.

CKAC faced serious competition which intensified in the 1960s as new French-language stations such as CKVL (opened in 1946), CJMS (opened in 1954) and CKLM (opened in 1962) were attracting listeners. While none of these stations had a signal nearly as impressive as CKAC (especially considering nighttime signal restrictions), this was not yet a problem for these stations as urban sprawl was still minimal.

However, CKAC quickly regained the top ratings spot in 1970, due to the crucial role its highly regarded news service had in keeping listeners informed during the October Crisis, in which the terrorist and separatist Front de libération du Québec movement kidnapped and murdered provincial Labour Minister Pierre Laporte.

The station was sold from Power Corporation (which bought La Presse and CKAC in 1968) to Telemedia in 1969, and CKAC became the flagship of the new Télémédia network, which also included CHLN 550 in Trois-Rivières, CHLT 630 in Sherbrooke, and the now-defunct CKCV 1280 in Quebec City, CKCH 970 in Hull (now Gatineau) and CJMT 1420 in Chicoutimi (now Saguenay).

From 1970 until the late 1980s, CKAC was regularly one of the very few stations in Canada to attract over one million listeners according to BBM ratings and regularly made millions of dollars in profits every year, as it was home to such hosts as long-time mornin gman Jacques Proulx, mid-morning host Suzanne Lévesque and 1980s midday host Pierre Pascau.

CKAC became the French radio flagship of the MLB Montreal Expos (who became the Washington Nationals after the 2004 season) in 1972, and broadcast post-season games in addition to all (or in the last years, most) Expos regular-season games until 2003, with legendary play-by-play host Jacques Doucet describing over 5,500 games.

The station got an FM sister station in 1977, when Telemedia launched CITE-FM on 107.3 MHz. (The two stations became competitors in May 2005; for more information, please see "Recent decline and sale to Corus Entertainment" section).

Unlike most other privately owned clear channel (class A) radio stations in North America, CKAC never converted to AM stereo.

=== Telemedia/Radiomutuel merger ===
CKAC ran into ratings difficulties in the early 1990s, mostly because of a resurgence from CJMS. These difficulties had a disproportionate economic impact on CKAC because of the recession that was particularly difficult in Montreal, and Quebec in general. In addition, radio in Quebec was generally suffering from the appearance of the new TQS TV network, which provoked a severe advertising price war.

Because of these factors, Telemedia merged its Quebec AM radio operations with Radiomutuel on September 30, 1994, to form the new Radiomédia network, and six AM stations across Quebec closed that very same day at 6 pm, including competitor CJMS 1280. Radiomutuel acquired 50% of CKAC, with the remainder still being owned by Telemedia (both companies continued to compete on the FM side). While CKAC survived thanks to its superior signal (compared to CJMS), most of the new programming included hosts from CJMS, and the merged newsroom was dominated by former Radiomutuel journalists.

The merger did help CKAC to regain many of its lost listeners and market shares, but still CKAC did not dominate in ratings as it used to do. Even the format switch of competitor CKVL to all-news radio in late 1999, did not prop up CKAC in any significant manner. CKAC actually started to lose significant numbers of listeners to Première Chaîne (CBF-FM 95.1) in the early 2000s.

=== Decline and sale to Corus Entertainment ===
In 2001, Astral Media (successor of Radiomutuel) got permission from the CRTC to buy Telemedia's Quebec radio properties, which included the RockDétente network as well as 50% of the Radiomédia network. However the Competition Bureau, another federal agency, partially blocked the deal over concentration of ownership issues, and ordered Astral Media to sell Radiomédia stations, which were temporarily put into trusteeship.

A first attempt failed when TVA (Quebecor) and RNC Media were refused permission by the CRTC in June 2003, to buy the stations, because of ownership concentration concerns. A second deal was announced in September 2003, with businessmen Gaétan Morin and Sylvain Chamberland, but a month later popular CKAC morning man Paul Arcand unexpectedly announced his departure from the station, and in late November Corus Entertainment announced that it would launch a new news/talk format on CHMP-FM 98.5 (then CKOO-FM) in January 2004, with Arcand as its morning man. Jean Lapierre, who was the afternoon drive host, also announced his departure as he returned to active politics; as a result Morin and Chamberland exercised their option to cancel their acquisition, paying a million-dollar fee to do so.

Astral Media then concluded in March 2004, an exchange of assets deal with Corus Entertainment; the latter publicly announced in June its intention of dramatically reducing programming expenses if the deal was approved, most notably by shutting down the CKAC newsroom.

Despite widespread opposition against that deal, the known existence of at least four other serious and much less controversial contenders to buy the Radiomédia stations, and numerous allegations to the effect that Corus Entertainment's offer was actually part of a larger plan to prevent any meaningful competition to its new FM talk radio format (as Corus seemed to try to weaken and steal listeners from CKAC and not from the increasingly popular CBF-FM, and its sales representatives claimed to clients that they would be better advised to buy advertising at CHMP-FM and not CKAC as they pretended the latter was going to close shortly no matter what would happen), the deal was approved in January 2005, by the CRTC in the midst of strong rumours that Astral Media would close CKAC if the deal was not approved. The deal took effect a few months later after a failed attempt by CKAC employees to appeal the decision to the Federal Cabinet.

On May 30, 2005, Corus Entertainment closed the reputed CKAC newsroom in favour of the lowly regarded CINF (Info 690) newsroom, which, until its January 2010 closure, produced newscasts for all French-language Corus Entertainment stations under the name "CorusNouvelles". (The production of CorusNouvelles would move to CHMP-FM following the closure of CINF). The Radiomédia network became known as the Corus Québec network, and CKAC continued to be the flagship of the network as it continued to be the source of talk programming for Corus' talk stations outside of Montreal. However ratings continued to suffer, and CKAC fell well below the 500,000 listeners mark according to BBM ratings.

=== All-sports era ===
The format switch to all-sports was announced on March 1, 2007, and took effect on April 2, 2007. Sister station CHMP-FM became the co-flagship of the Corus Québec network. The long-time tradition of airing news bulletins on the 45th minute of the hour, a practice that was begun in 1972, was ended. Music programming also disappeared from the station's schedule for the first time ever, except for late-night Souvenirs Garantis oldies programming. Before April 2, 2007, the station had a news/talk format with sports talk in the evenings and some music (mostly oldies) during weekends.

CKAC was the radio flagship of the Montreal Canadiens (NHL hockey), the Montreal Alouettes (CFL football), the Montreal Impact (NASL soccer) and the Toronto Blue Jays (MLB baseball). The station broadcast all Canadiens and Alouettes games, and all Impact games except for regular season road games; the number of Blue Jays games aired is limited to only a few per year.

On April 30, 2010, it was announced that Cogeco will acquire all radio stations owned by Corus in Quebec for $80 million, pending CRTC approval. However, Cogeco must either apply with the CRTC for an exemption from the common ownership policy, or sell off some of these (or Cogeco's own stations) to a third party as they will be over the maximum allowable number of stations in Montreal, Quebec City and Sherbrooke. Corus is selling off their Quebec radio stations, as they are less profitable than Corus's stations in other parts of Canada.

On December 17, 2010, the CRTC approved the sale of most of Corus' radio stations in Quebec, including CKAC, to Cogeco. The same decision, however, also denied Cogeco's request to convert Sherbrooke station CKOY-FM 104.5 to a repeater of CKAC. (That station would later be re-called CJTS-FM before closing down in 2011).

=== End of all-sports era and transition to traffic information ===
On September 2, 2011, at exactly 10 am, CKAC dropped its all-sports format. A recorded announcement from Cogeco vice president Richard Lachance was played, announcing a new traffic information format that would launch at 4:30 am on September 6. Branded as Radio Circulation 730, the new format is being subsidized by the Quebec government, and will feature round-the-clock traffic updates from around Montreal, and it has become Canada's first radio station entirely dedicated to traffic and weather (because AM730 adds some Vancouver's news from CKNW in between). This relaunch superseded an application Cogeco had filed with the CRTC earlier in the year to reactivate the former CINF (Info 690) transmitter for a similar format (while maintaining all-sports on CKAC). Unlike Cogeco's original plans for 690 kHz, CKAC's traffic radio service operates 24 hours a day, with live announcers on the air between 6:00 and 1:00 (non-holiday weekdays are 90' earlier). Pre-recorded announcements detailing overnight road closures and detours are played when live announcers are not on the air.

Effective September 6, some of CKAC's sports programming and airstaff have moved over to CHMP, along with Montreal Canadiens and Montreal Alouettes broadcasts.

After playing a wide variety of continuous music over Labour Day weekend, Radio Circulation 730 made its debut at 4:30 am on September 6, as announced. The first announcer heard on the air was Michel Millard.

Alongside the original (and ultimately abandoned) application to place traffic information on 690, Cogeco also planned on an English-language traffic radio service for 940 previously used by CINW. However, that frequency was awarded instead to Paul Tietolman, for a francophone news-talk radio service.

== Rebroadcasters ==
The following community-owned rebroadcasters, mostly operated by the Northeast Social Club near Hydro-Québec generating stations, had been listed with the CRTC as rebroadcasting CKAC in the 1990s and 2000s. Most of these licences received one-year interim renewals in August 2011, just before CKAC announced its switch to an all-traffic format. No further information about these transmitters has been publicized since then.

=== Transmitters ===
Rebroadcasters of CKAC
City of licence	Identifier	Frequency	RECNet	CRTC Decision
La Grande-1 generating station	CFAE-FM	101.7 FM	Query	2004-258
La Grande-3 generating station	CFBD-FM	93.1 FM	Query	2004-258
Guyer	CFCC-FM	92.1 FM	Query	2004-258
Keyano (Camp LG-4)	CFDD-FM	93.1 FM	Query	2004-258
Nikamo (Camp LA-1)	CFEA-FM	92.5 FM	Query	2004-258
Laforge-2 generating station	CFFD-FM	103.9 FM	Query	2004-258
Brisay	CFGA-FM	92.1 FM	Query	2004-258
Champion	CIHQ-FM	93.1 FM	Query	
Poste Laverendrye	VF2155	103.9 FM	Query	98-323

== See also ==
- CHMJ, former sister station in Vancouver that also carried an all-traffic format.
