= CFGE-FM =

Radio station in Sherbrooke

Coordinates: 45°22′29″N 71°55′00″W

- Sherbrooke, Quebec; Canada
- Frequency: 93.7 MHz
- Branding: 93.7/98.1 Rythme FM

Programming
- Language: French
- Format: Adult contemporary
- Affiliations: Rythme FM

Ownership
- Owner: Cogeco; (Cogeco Diffusion Inc.)
- Sister stations: CKOY-FM

History
- First air date: August 2004
- Call sign meaning: Grand Estrie

Technical information
- Class: B
- ERP: 9,537 watts (average); 25,500 watts (peak); both vertical & horizontal signals
- HAAT: 207.1 metres (679 ft)
- Repeater: CFGE-FM-1 98.1 Magog

Links
- Website: estrie.rythmefm.com

CFGE-FM is a French-language Canadian radio station located in Sherbrooke, Quebec. The station airs an adult contemporary format, and is part of the Rythme FM network which operates across much of Quebec. The station's transmitter is located at Mount Bellevue.

Owned and operated by Cogeco, it broadcasts on 93.7 MHz using a directional antenna with an average effective radiated power of 7,412 watts and a peak effective radiated power of 25,500 watts (class B). Since its transmitter site is located at Mount Bellevue, the station has (unlike competitors CITE-FM-1 and CIMO-FM) good coverage in the city of Sherbrooke, but because of severe deficiencies in covering neighbouring Magog, the station operates a relay there, CFGE-FM-1, which broadcasts on 98.1 MHz using a directional antenna with an average effective radiated power of 360 watts and a peak effective radiated power of 900 watts (class B).

The station received CRTC approval in 2003.

On August 28, 2009, CFGE-FM received CRTC approval to increase their effective radiated power (ERP) to 7,412 watts, its maximum ERP to 25,550 watts), increasing its effective HAAT from 158.9 to 207.1 metres, and by relocating its transmitter.
