= CKXO-FM =

Radio station in Chibougamau, Quebec

Coordinates: 49°56′46″N 74°20′57″W

Chibougamau, Quebec; Canada
- Frequency: 93.5 MHz
- Branding: Planète 93,5

Programming
- Format: Adult contemporary

Ownership
- Owner: Cogeco Média
- Sister stations: CFGT-FM, CHRL-FM, CHVD-FM, CKYK-FM

History
- First air date: November 21, 1969
- Former frequencies: 1240 kHz (1969–2005)

Technical information
- Class: C1
- ERP: 13.386 kW average 56.23 kW peak horizontal polarization only
- HAAT: 222.5 metres (730 ft)

Links
- Website: www.chibougamau.planeteradio.ca

CKXO-FM is a French-language Canadian radio station in Chibougamau, Quebec.

Owned and operated by Cogeco Média following its 2018 acquisition of most of the stations formerly owned by RNC Media, it broadcasts on 93.5 MHz with an average effective radiated power of 19,800 watts and a peak effective radiated power of 75,000 watts (class C1). The station has an adult contemporary music format branded as Planète 93,5.

The station was originally launched on November 21, 1969 by Radio Maria-Chapdelaine, broadcasting on 1240 AM with the call sign CJMD. The station later launched a rebroadcaster in Chapais in 1971, broadcasting on 1340 AM with the call sign CFED.

The station was acquired by Antenne 6 in 1993, and adopted its current FM frequency in 2005.
