= CKOI (network) =

Radio network in Quebec, Canada

- Type: Radio network
- Country: Canada

Ownership
- Owner: Cogeco

History
- Launch date: November 6, 2009
- Closed: August 20, 2012

Coverage
- Availability: FM: Quebec

Links
- Website: CKOI

CKOI was a network of French-language adult top 40 outlets broadcasting throughout the province of Quebec. Created by Corus Québec on November 6, 2009, the network and its stations are currently owned and operated by Cogeco.

The name of the network is derived from the call sign of its flagship station in Montreal, CKOI-FM. The name "CKOI" is pronounced like a word—it is a homonym of "C'est quoi ?", French for "What is it?".

== History ==
Corus Québec first attempt to create a CKOI network back in 2001 when Corus brought Métromédia CMR Inc. which, among its stations, owned CKOI-FM, CJDM-FM in Drummondville and CIKI-FM in Rimouski—the latter two were Radio Énergie affiliates at the time. CJDM and CIKI adopted the CKOI logo style, but kept their call signs and local programming. Some special shows, like visiting artists at the CKOI studio, were broadcast on all three stations.

In June 2005, CJDM-FM and CIKI-FM were sold to Astral Media and re-established their "Énergie" branding. CKOI-FM again became a standalone station.

In January 2008, Corus Québec brought the station CIGR-FM Génération Rock, changed its call letters to CKOY-FM and adopt a modified CKOI logo (with the Y), but kept the modern rock sound.

In 2000, Corus Québec acquired Montmagny-based CFEL-FM, moving its transmitter and studio to Quebec City by the end of 2008. On November 6, 2009, Corus added CFEL-FM to the CKOI network. Unlike the "NRJ" (now once again "Énergie") or "RockDétente" (now "Rouge FM") groups, CKOI stations kept the majority of their local programming.

On April 30, 2010, Cogeco announced the buyout of Corus Québec for $80 million; the transaction was approved by the Canadian Radio-television and Telecommunications Commission on December 17, 2010. Cogeco took over control of the Corus Québec stations, including CKOI-FM and its sisters, on February 1, 2011. However, as a condition of the purchases, Cogeco must sell CFEL-FM 102.1 and CKOY-FM 104.5 to a third party; as a result, these stations (along with legacy Cogeco station CJEC-FM Quebec City, which must also be sold) were placed in a blind trust in the interim. On November 9, 2011, it was announced that Cogeco would sell CFEL-FM and CJEC-FM to Leclerc Communication Inc., a company owned by Quebec City businessman Jacques Leclerc, owner of Laura Secord Chocolates and Biscuits Leclerc.

On February 1, 2011, Sherbrooke stations CHLT-FM 107.7 (Souvenirs Garantis) and CKOY-FM 104.5 swapped affiliation, with 104.5 becoming CJTS-FM and 107.7 became CKOY-FM; the latter kept the morning and evening talk shows which were aired under its Souvenirs Garantis affiliation, but the remaining of the programming (9am to 4pm and overnight) was replaced by programming from the CKOI network. Outside of the talk programming for the new affiliates, all stations in the CKOI network carried a hot adult contemporary format.

Also that day, the CKOI network adopted a new logo, slogan and image for the network; however, CFEL-FM retained the old branding and slogan. Following its transfer to Leclerc Communication, the station switched to an all-locally originated schedule, continuing to carry the CKOI name and Corus-era logo under license from Cogeco. (They would adopt the current logo and slogan by Summer 2012.) CKOI-FM remained a standalone station, with the Sherbrooke, Gatineau and Trois-Rivières stations sharing programming as part of the network.

On February 21, 2011, CJRC-FM Gatineau and CHLN-FM Trois-Rivières also switched from Souvenirs Garantis to the CKOI network; all stations retained their local morning show, but carried CKOI programming at other hours. Both these stations would soon change their calls to CKOF-FM and CKOB-FM, respectively.

By January 2012, CKOI-FM returned to their Top 40 format; however, the Gatineau, Sherbrooke and Trois-Rivières stations retained their hybrid talk/Hot AC format.

On June 20, 2012, Cogeco announced that CKOF-FM, CKOY-FM and CKOB-FM would revert to their talk formats on August 20, 2012, all but dismantling the CKOI network. Apart from an expansion of talk programming, no changes in existing talk and sports programming were expected for these stations.

On September 2, 2015, Leclerc rebranded CFEL-FM as blvd 102.1, continuing its CHR/Top 40 format, but with more emphasis on francophone music. This all but ended the use of CKOI as a brand outside of Montreal, where only CKOI-FM continues to brand as "CKOI".

== Stations ==
=== Current ===
Station	Frequency (MHz)	City
CKOI-FM	96.9	Montreal

=== Former affiliates ===
Station	Frequency (MHz)	City
CFEL-FM	102.1	Quebec City
CKOY-FM	107.7	Sherbrooke
CKOF-FM	104.7	Gatineau
CKOB-FM	106.9	Trois-Rivières

All five stations used on-air branding "CKOI" despite their different call letters.
