= CFGT-FM =

Radio station in Alma, Quebec, Canada

Coordinates: 48°35′34″N 71°35′25″W

Alma, Quebec; Canada
- Frequency: 104.5 MHz
- Branding: Planète 104,5

Programming
- Format: Adult contemporary

Ownership
- Owner: Cogeco
- Sister stations: CHRL-FM, CHVD-FM, CKXO-FM, CKYK-FM

History
- First air date: October 26, 1953
- Former frequencies: 1270 kHz (1953–2010)

Technical information
- Class: B
- Power: 20,000 watts

Links
- Website: alma.planeteradio.ca

CFGT-FM is a French-language Canadian radio station located in Alma, Quebec.

Owned and operated by Cogeco following its 2018 acquisition of most of the stations formerly owned by RNC Media, it broadcasts on 104.5 MHz with an effective radiated power of 20,000 watts, using an omnidirectional antenna (class B); it was previously heard on the AM band, on 1270 kHz, with a daytime power of 10,000 watts and a nighttime power of 5,000 watts as a class B station, using a directional antenna with slightly different daytime and nighttime directional patterns in order to protect various other stations on that frequency.

The station an adult contemporary format branded as Planète 104,5. Prior to its conversion to FM, CFGT had a hybrid talk radio / adult contemporary format branded as L'Info Radio CFGT 1270.

== History ==
CFGT was founded by Lionel Morin and went on the air on October 26, 1953, by Radio Lac St-Jean Ltée. The station initially had a power of 1,000 watts; it was authorized to increase its power in 1974. CFGT had to close for extended periods in 1982 and 1994 due to financial problems.

Prior to its conversion to FM, CFGT was an affiliate of the now-defunct Radiomédia/Corus Québec network, which operated across the Canadian province of Quebec.

== AM to FM ==
An application to move to FM on 97.7 MHz with an effective radiated power of 100,000 watts was denied in 1993.

In March 2007, it became known that the station planned to apply again to move to FM.

An application to convert to the FM band on 97.7 MHz with an effective radiated power of 50,000 watts was denied once again on September 11, 2008.

On March 25, 2009, CFGT has yet again applied to convert to the FM dial, again at 97.7 MHz with an effective radiated power of 50,000 watts, which finally received CRTC approval on August 20, 2009. On March 3, 2010, the station received approval to use the 104.5 MHz frequency, instead of 97.7 MHz.

On October 13, 2010, at 6:00 a.m. EDT, CFGT made the move to the FM band on 104.5 MHz as CFGT-FM Planète 104,5. After the move to FM, CFGT abandoned most of its talk programming, which, at that point was mostly networked from Corus Québec, adopting a full-time adult contemporary format.

Only three days later, on October 16, 2010, the old AM 1270 CFGT signal left the air, opting not to use the entire 90-day simulcast period.
