= Mont-Bellevue =

Mont-Bellevue may refer to:

- Mont-Bellevue, Quebec, a borough of Sherbrooke, Quebec,
- Mont-Bellevue Park, a recreational ski hill within the borough.
