= CHVD-FM =

Radio station in Dolbeau-Mistassini, Quebec

Coordinates: 48°53′10″N 72°20′31″W

Dolbeau-Mistassini, Quebec; Canada
- Frequency: 100.3 MHz
- Branding: Planète 100,3

Programming
- Format: Adult contemporary

Ownership
- Owner: Cogeco
- Sister stations: CFGT-FM, CHRL-FM, CKXO-FM, CKYK-FM

History
- First air date: 1967
- Former frequencies: 1230 kHz (1967–2002)
- Call sign meaning: Ville Dolbeau

Technical information
- Class: C1
- ERP: 21,400 watts average 50,000 watts peak Vertical & Horizontal polarization
- HAAT: 172 metres (564 ft)

Links
- Website: www.dolbeau-mistassini.planeteradio.ca

CHVD-FM is a French-language Canadian radio station in Dolbeau-Mistassini, Quebec.

Owned and operated by Cogeco following its 2018 acquisition of most of the stations formerly owned by RNC Media, it broadcasts on 100.3 MHz with an average effective radiated power of 21,400 watts and a peak effective radiated power of 50,000 watts (class C1). The station has an adult contemporary format branded as Planète 100,3.

The station was originally launched in 1967 by Radio Maria-Chapdelaine, broadcasting on 1230 AM. The station later launched a low-power rebroadcaster in Saint-Félicien in 1986, broadcasting on 92.1 FM with the call sign CHVD-1.

The station was acquired by Antenne 6 in 1993, and adopted its current FM frequency in 2002.
