= Louis Champagne =

'Louis Champagne may refer to:

- Louis Champagne (actor), Canadian actor
- Louis Champagne (radio host) (1947/1948–2026), Canadian talk radio host
- Louis Napoléon Champagne (1860–1911), Canadian politician
