= Souvenirs Garantis =

Canadian French-language radio network

- Type: Radio network
- Country: Canada
- Availability: FM: Quebec
- Founded: by Corus Québec
- Owner: Cogeco
- Launch date: 2005
- Dissolved: 2012

Souvenirs Garantis (French for "Memories Guaranteed") was a network of French-language classic hits radio stations broadcasting throughout Quebec, Canada. Anchored by CFOM-FM 102.9 in Quebec City, the format was created by Corus Entertainment, as part of the Corus Québec group of stations.

Under Corus ownership, Souvenirs Garantis stations were based in all major Quebec markets, except for Montreal, which had no station carrying the format full-time.

The format featured a largely defined classic hits format, including music from the 1970s to the 1990s but mostly from the 1970s and 1980s.

CFOM-FM's logo as a "Souvenirs Garantis" station, 2005-2012. All stations of the network used a logo design similar to this one.

The branding was first used by CFOM-FM in 2005, though that station carried an oldies format since 1995. CFOM-FM acted as the flagship station of the Souvenirs Garantis network.

In March 2009, Corus expanded the Souvenirs Garantis format to four other stations -- CHLT-FM 107.7 in Sherbrooke, CJRC-FM 104.7 in Gatineau, CHLN-FM 106.9 in Trois-Rivières and CKRS-FM 98.3 in Saguenay—replacing their long-time news-talk formats on these stations. These changes also came following the closedown of these stations' AM signals, as well as a CRTC revision of its formatting regulations a few weeks earlier to permit oldies music on FM radio for the first time. These stations carry local programming, along with some networked programs originating from CFOM.

There was no full-time Souvenirs Garantis outlet in Montreal, though its programming is simulcasted during weekends on CHMP-FM 98.5; until 2010, it was also carried during late-night hours on CKAC-AM 730. It was also broadcast overnight on news radio station CINF AM 690, until that station folded in January 2010.

On April 30, 2010, it was announced that Cogeco would acquire all radio stations owned by Corus in Quebec, including its Corus Québec stations and Montreal anglophone station CFQR-FM, pending CRTC approval. The sale of the Corus Québec stations has been approved by the CRTC on December 17, 2010.

On June 25, it was reported that Corus has agreed to sell CKRS to a local company called Radio Saguenay; the station soon after adopted the "FM 98" moniker but retaining the classic hits format with local talk programming during the day.

On February 1, 2011, Cogeco switched the Sherbrooke station from CHLT 107.7 FM to CKOY 104.5 FM; the latter station, which was to have been sold off by December 2011, was re-called CJTS-FM, picking up the Souvenirs Garantis format and branding. That station would go dark on December 6, 2011, in compliance with the conditions set forth by the sale of the station to Cogeco, as Cogeco was unable to find a buyer for the station by the deadline.

On February 21, 2011, CJRC-FM in Gatineau and CHLN-FM in Trois-Rivières was rebranded to CKOI 104.7 and CKOI 106.9, respectively, bringing the expanding CKOI format and branding to the Ottawa Valley and the Mauricie region. (CKOF-FM, CKOY-FM and CKOB-FM reverted to their talk formats on August 20, 2012.)

Sometime during 2012, CHMP-FM discontinued carrying Souvenirs Garantis programming, as they expanded its talk programming to late nights and weekends, with some periods, particularly on weekends, filled with their own music blocks. This all but ended the Souvenirs Garantis network, which in the short term, continued to be heard exclusively on CFOM-FM.

On Sunday September 16, 2012, CFOM-FM discontinued its Souvenirs Garantis branding, switching to a new name, 102,9 Québec. The station's classic hits and talk programming would remain; the station would later rebrand as M 102.9 in August 2014, featuring a more hit music-intensive format. CFOM-FM would adopt the Rythme FM branding on August 16, 2021.
