= CKOB-FM =

Radio station in Trois-Rivières

Coordinates: 46°14′15″N 72°33′18″W

- Trois-Rivières, Quebec; Canada
- Broadcast area: Mauricie
- Frequency: 106.9 MHz
- Branding: 106,9 Mauricie

Programming
- Language: French
- Format: Talk radio/Sports/Rock
- Affiliations: Montreal Canadiens

Ownership
- Owner: Cogeco; (591991 B.C. Ltd.)
- Sister stations: CJEB-FM

History
- First air date: October 17, 1937
- Former call signs: CHLN (1937–2011)
- Former frequencies: 550 kHz (–2007)
- Call sign meaning: disambiguation of sister station CKOI-FM

Technical information
- Class: C1
- ERP: 59,000 watts; (peak ERP 100,000 watts)
- HAAT: 85.6 metres (281 ft)

Links
- Website: www.fm1069.ca

CKOB-FM is a French-language Canadian radio station located in Trois-Rivières, Quebec, Canada.

Owned and operated by Cogeco, it broadcasts on 106.9 MHz using a directional antenna with an average effective radiated power of 59,000 watts and a peak effective radiated power of 100,000 watts, as a Class C1 station. The station moved to the FM band on August 20, 2007 ; it was previously heard on the AM band, on 550 kHz, with a daytime power of 10,000 watts and a nighttime power of 5,000 watts as a class B station, using a directional antenna with slightly different daytime and nighttime directional patterns in order to protect various other stations on that frequency.

The station identifies itself as 106,9 FM and is one of the few full-time FM talk stations in North America to broadcast in stereo.

== History ==
CKOB went on the air as CHLN, an AM station on October 17, 1937, and was originally on 1420 kHz; it moved to 1450 in 1941, and moved again to 550 in 1945.

CHLN had one rebroadcaster, namely CKSM in Shawinigan. That station broadcast on 1220 kHz, with a daytime power of 10,000 watts and a nighttime power of 2,500 watts as a class B station, using a directional antenna with slightly different daytime and nighttime directional patterns in order to protect various other stations on that frequency. CKSM went on the air on April 29, 1951, and ceased to produce local programming on June 12, 1995. CKSM was not owned by Corus Entertainment as it was retained by Astral Media; it ceased to broadcast on June 30, 2007.

CHLN was authorized by the Canadian Radio-television and Telecommunications Commission (CRTC) to move to FM on November 24, 2006. CHLN started broadcasting at 106.9 FM on August 20, 2007. Rebroadcaster CKSM was not affected by this decision.

CHLN logo as a "Souvenirs Garantis" station, 2009–2011.

In March 2009, then-owner Corus Entertainment announced plans to drop the talk format on Corus Québec outlets CHLN, CJRC-FM in Gatineau, CHLT-FM in Sherbrooke and CKRS-FM in Saguenay in favour of a classic hits-oldies format branded as "Souvenirs Garantis", effective on March 28, 2009.

Logo as "CKOI 106.9", 2011-2012

On December 17, 2010, the CRTC approved the sale of most of Corus' radio stations in Quebec, including CHLN-FM, to Cogeco.

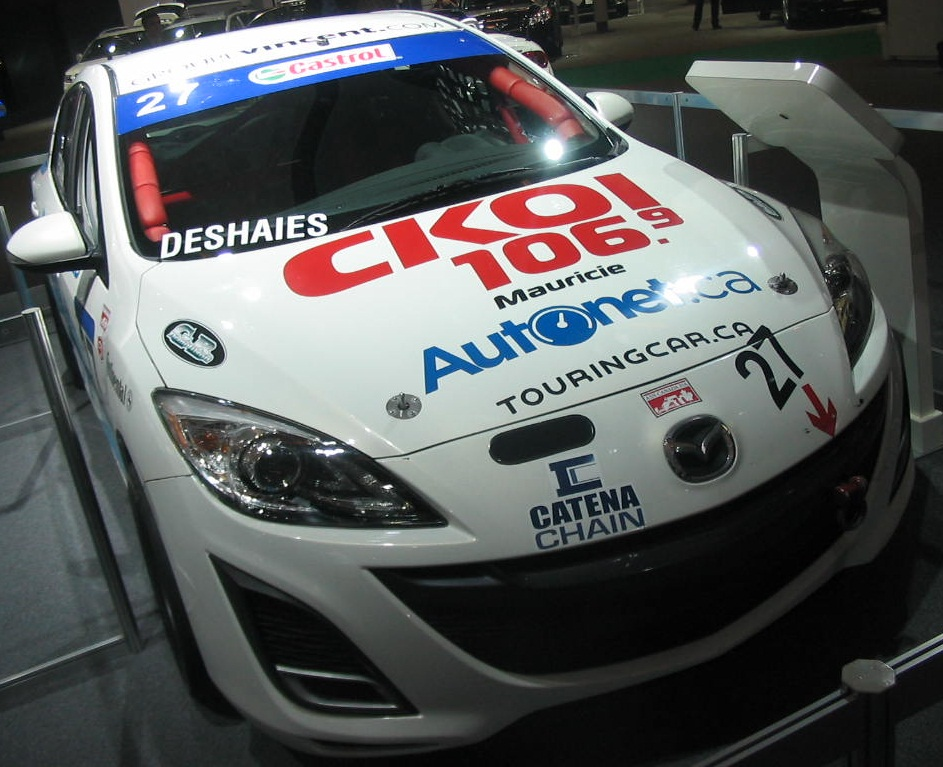
Mazda3 competition car with the station's logo.

On February 21 at 5:30 am, CHLN-FM flipped to the hot adult contemporary format and CKOI branding of its Montreal sister station, CKOI-FM; the station changed its callsign to CKOB-FM.

On June 20, 2012, Cogeco announced that CKOB-FM, along with CKOF-FM and CKOY-FM, would revert to their talk formats on August 20, 2012, all but dismantling the CKOI network. Apart from an expansion of talk programming, no changes in existing talk and sports programming were expected for these stations.

CKOB was a former call sign from an AM radio station, CKOB in Renfrew, Ontario, in the 1970s through to the 1990s. The call sign was believed to be used previously as a radio station repeater in Obed Mine, Alberta.
