= CKOY-FM =

Radio station in Sherbrooke

Coordinates: 45.4024°N 71.9650°W

- Sherbrooke, Quebec; Canada
- Frequency: 107.7 MHz
- Branding: 107,7 Estrie

Programming
- Language: French
- Format: Talk radio/Sports/Rock
- Affiliations: Montreal Canadiens

Ownership
- Owner: Cogeco; (591991 B.C. Ltd.)
- Sister stations: CFGE-FM

History
- First air date: June 27, 1937
- Former call signs: CHLT (1937–2007); CHLT-FM (2007–2011)
- Call sign meaning: disambiguation of sister station CKOI-FM

Technical information
- Class: C1
- ERP: 11,000 watts average; 25,000 watts peak; vertical & horizontal polarization
- HAAT: 226.5 metres (743 ft)

Links
- Website: www.fm1077.ca

CKOY-FM is a French-language Canadian radio station located in Sherbrooke, Quebec, Canada.

Owned and operated by Cogeco, it broadcasts on 107.7 MHz using a directional antenna with an average effective radiated power of 11,000 watts and a peak effective radiated power of 25,000 watts (class C1). The station's transmitter is located at Mount Bellevue.

The station identifies itself as "107.7 FM" and is one of the few full-time FM talk stations in North America to broadcast in stereo.

== History ==
The station first aired as CHLT on AM 1210 kHz in 1937, moved to AM 1240 on March 29, 1941, moved to AM 900 in 1946 and then to 630 AM in the 1950s. It was owned by the city's main newspaper, La Tribune, hence its call letters. Originally a Radio-Canada affiliate, it became independent in 1978 when CBF set up a repeater in the city.

Short-lived Corus-era CKOI 107,7 logo, used during the first two weeks of February 2011.

The station moved to the FM band as CHLT-FM on August 20, 2007. Due to signal deficiencies on 102.1, the station was given CRTC approval to move to 107.7 FM on July 30, 2008. Since its transmitter site is located at Mount Bellevue, the station has (unlike competitors CITE-FM-1 and CIMO-FM) good coverage in the city of Sherbrooke. The call sign "CHLT-FM" was previously used by CITE-FM-1, which was originally created in the 1960s as a sister station of CHLT.

In March 2009, then-owner Corus Entertainment announced plans to drop the talk radio format on CHLT, CJRC-FM in Gatineau, CHLN-FM in Trois-Rivières and CKRS-FM in Saguenay in favour of a classic hits-oldies format branded as "Souvenirs Garantis", effective on March 28, 2009.

On December 17, 2010, the CRTC approved the sale of most of Corus' radio stations in Quebec, including CHLT-FM, to Cogeco.

CKOI 107.7 logo, used during 2011–2012.

On February 1, 2011, Cogeco swapped the music formats on 104.5 FM and 107.7 FM. 107.7 assumed the hot adult contemporary format and CKOY-FM call letters that were previously used on 104.5, which would assume the Souvenirs Garantis format. (104.5 FM, last known as CJTS-FM, would cease operations on December 6, 2011.)

Logo of 107.7 FM Estrie from 2016–2021.

On June 20, 2012, Cogeco announced that CKOY-FM, along with CKOF-FM and CKOB-FM, would revert to their talk formats on August 20, 2012, all but dismantling the CKOI network. Apart from an expansion of talk programming, no changes in the existing talk and sports programming were expected for these stations.
