= CKGS-FM =

Radio station in Saguenay, Quebec

Coordinates: 48°21′08″N 70°53′56″W

- Saguenay, Quebec; Canada
- Broadcast area: La Baie
- Frequency: 105.5 MHz
- Branding: Hit Country 105,5

Programming
- Language: French
- Format: Country

Ownership
- Owner: Arsenal Media

History
- First air date: March 19, 2009

Technical information
- Class: A
- ERP: 6 kW
- HAAT: 18.3 metres (60 ft)

Links
- Website: hitcountry.com

CKGS-FM is a French-language Canadian radio station located in Saguenay, Quebec. The station serves the borough of La Baie.

Owned and operated by Arsenal Media (formerly Attraction Radio), it broadcasts on 105.5 MHz with an effective radiated power of 6,000 watts (class A). The station has a country music format. It is better known to be the home of controversial host Louis Champagne since November 2010.

The station was originally licensed by the Canadian Radio-television and Telecommunications Commission (CRTC) in March 2007. However, because the applicant had requested the 99.9 FM frequency, which was adjacent to CKAJ-FM's newly licensed rebroadcaster on 99.7, the license was made conditional on the applicant submitting a new application for the use of a different frequency. CKGS-FM has later submitted an application to use 105.5 MHz, which was approved by the CRTC in August 2008.

On August 2, 2010, CKGS-FM applied to the CRTC to add a transmitter at Chicoutimi which would operate at 105.9 MHz. This application was denied on December 13, 2010.

On July 3, 2012, 9202-1617 Québec inc. received approval from the CRTC to change CKGS-FM's frequency to 105.7; as of December 2014, the station has yet to relocate its signal to the new frequency. That same year, the station would be sold to its current owners, Attraction Radio. According to the stations' website, CKGS-FM still remains at 105.5 as of 2016.

In November 2014, it was announced that CKGS-FM and sister station CKRS-FM (now CILM-FM) would join Cogeco's Rythme FM network starting February 9, 2015; this followed the CRTC's approval of CKRS's format change, which sought an Adult Contemporary format and a reduction in local talk programming.

In August 2018, Attraction Radio abandoned the Rythme FM network affiliation for an in-house branding "O". CKGS-FM would break the simulcast of CILM-FM on September 17, 2019, when it adopted the Country-Western format as Hit Country 105,5. Cogeco would acquire CILM-FM in April 2022, with that station rejoining Rythme FM soon after.

== See also ==
- Louis Champagne
