= CFGL-FM =

Radio station in Laval, Quebec

Laval, Quebec; Canada
- Broadcast area: Greater Montreal
- Frequency: 105.7 MHz (HD Radio)
- Branding: 105.7 Rythme FM

Programming
- Language: French
- Format: Adult contemporary
- Affiliations: Rythme FM

Ownership
- Owner: Cogeco; (Cogeco Diffusion Acquisitions Inc.)
- Sister stations: CHMP-FM, CKAC, CKOI-FM, CKBE-FM

History
- First air date: September 1968
- Call sign meaning: Grand Laval

Technical information
- Class: C1
- ERP: 41,000 watts
- HAAT: 297 metres (974 ft)

Links
- Website: montreal.rythmefm.com

CFGL-FM (105.7 MHz) is a commercial radio station serving Greater Montreal, airing a French adult contemporary radio format. It is the flagship of the Rythme FM network, which operates across much of Quebec. The station is licensed to the off-Island suburb of Laval.

Owned and operated by Cogeco, it broadcasts with an effective radiated power (ERP) of 41,000 watts as a Class C1 station, using an omnidirectional antenna atop Mount Royal, at 297 metres (974 ft) in height above average terrain (HAAT). Studios and offices are on Boulevard Saint-Martin Est in Laval.

== History ==
CFGL was founded in September 1968 by Jean-Pierre Coallier and Roland Saucier. It originally was powered at 100,000 watts but from a tower in Laval only 400 feet in height. It began as a French-language beautiful music station serving Laval and the suburbs north of Montreal. In the 1980s, the audience for the easy listening format began aging, so CFGL began adding more vocals in an effort to attract younger listeners. It made the full transition to French soft adult contemporary music in 1992.

In 1999, it switched to a French mainstream adult contemporary sound, known as Rythme FM. The move proved to be quite successful. CFGL became the top-rated French-language radio station in North America. It held that distinction until its sister station, French talk outlet CHMP-FM, overtook it in Fall 2011.

On May 17, 2017, CFGL-FM began broadcasting in HD Radio, offering a digital radio simulcast of its FM feed on its digital sideband, with room for potential expansion of subchannels in the future.

By 2019, the station returned to soft adult contemporary.

== Notable hosts ==
- Mitsou Gélinas, 2012 to 2021
- Pierre Nadeau OC CQ, announcer circa 1979
