= Dery Telecom =

Canadian internet service provider

Dery Telecom logo

DERYtelecom was a cable television distributor Internet service provider and Phone in Canada based in Saguenay, Quebec. The company operated in 13 regions in Quebec in municipalities of 600 residents or less. As of 2019, the distributor had roughly 100,000 subscribers. Since 14 December 2020, DERYtelecom is a subsidiary of Cogeco.

In 2023, Cogeco stopped using the DERY brand and services are now offered under the Cogeco brand.
