= Louis Champagne (radio host) =

Canadian talk radio personality (1947/1948–2026)

Louis Champagne (1947 or 1948 – July 17, 2026) was a Canadian talk radio personality, who hosted a morning daily program on CKGS-FM in La Baie, Quebec. He was the longtime host of another daily program on CKRS-FM until November 2008. He is best known for controversial remarks he made during the 2007 Quebec election campaign, when he interviewed Lac-Saint-Jean Parti Québécois candidate Alexandre Cloutier on February 19, 2007.

== Controversy ==
Sylvain Gaudreault, the PQ candidate in the neighbouring riding to Cloutier's, and André Boisclair, the Parti Québécois' leader during the election campaign, are both openly gay. During the interview, Champagne asked Cloutier,

When you show up during the campaign, listen, aren’t you going to face the question, "Is the Parti Québécois a club of fags?"

Champagne also asserted that local factory workers would never vote for a tapette (the French language equivalent to "faggot").

== Aftermath ==
Both Cloutier and Gaudreault won their ridings on election night.

Champagne was suspended from the airwaves on March 6 pending an investigation by the station's owner, Corus Québec. He had also previously been the subject of complaints against the station by the Université du Québec à Chicoutimi and the Cégep de Jonquière.

== On CKGS-FM La Baie ==
Longtime on CKRS, Louis Champagne hosted talk morning daily program on CKGS-FM in La Baie, effective on November 22, 2010.

== Death ==
Louis Champagne died on July 17, 2026, at the age of 78.
