= CHMY-FM =

Radio station in Renfrew, Ontario

Coordinates: 45.4704°N 76.6815°W

- Renfrew, Ontario; Canada
- Frequency: 96.1 MHz
- Branding: 96.1 myFM

Programming
- Format: Adult contemporary

Ownership
- Owner: My Broadcasting Corporation

History
- First air date: 2004
- Call sign meaning: "My"

Technical information
- Class: A
- ERP: 1.66 kW
- HAAT: 128.5 metres (422 ft)

Links
- Website: renfrewtoday.ca

CHMY-FM is the call sign of an English-language radio station located in Renfrew, Ontario on the FM dial at 96.1 MHz. Owned by My Broadcasting Corporation, the station airs an adult contemporary format branded as 96.1 myFM, and is the company's flagship station.

The station was licensed by the Canadian Radio-television and Telecommunications Commission in 2004.

The station also has a rebroadcast transmitter in Arnprior (CHMY-FM-1), that originally operated on 104.7 FM. That transmitter was certified by Industry Canada Spectrum Management to move to 107.7 FM in 2007, due to potential broadcast interference from the FM conversion of CJRC in Gatineau. The switch in frequency took place in the spring of 2007. In October 2008, power was increased on CHMY-FM-1, and the transmitter site was relocated from the Arnprior water tower to the Glentel site at Mount Pakenham. On April 2, 2014, the CRTC approved My Broadcasting's application for a new English-language station in Arnprior, which will operate at 107.7 MHz, replacing rebroadcaster CHMY-FM-1 at that frequency. On the same date, the CRTC denied My Broadcasting's application for a new station in Carleton Place, which would have broadcast at 97.5 MHz.

On October 28, 2010, My Broadcasting applied to increase the effected radiated power for CHMY-FM; this application was approved on January 12, 2011.

In 2016, CHMY-FM-1 Arnprior dropped simulcast with CHMY-FM Renfrew, to operate as a full-time radio station at 107.7 FM in Arnprior. CHMY-FM-1 changed to CIMI-FM then changed to CFMP-FM.
