= CINF =

Radio station in Montreal (1946–2010)

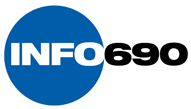
- Montreal, Quebec; Canada
- Frequency: 690 kHz
- Branding: Info 690

Programming
- Format: All-news

Ownership
- Owner: Corus Quebec
- Sister stations: CFQR-FM, CHMP-FM, CKAC, CINW, CKOI-FM

History
- First air date: November 3, 1946
- Last air date: January 29, 2010
- Former call signs: CKVL (1946–1999)
- Former frequencies: 990 kHz (1946–1948); 980 kHz (1948–1954); 850 kHz (1954–2000)
- Call sign meaning: Information

Technical information
- Class: A
- Power: 50,000 watts
- Transmitter coordinates: 45°23′31″N 73°41′56″W

Links
- Website: Info 690

CINF was a French language Canadian radio station located in Montreal, Quebec.

Owned and operated by Corus Quebec, it broadcast on 690 kHz with a power of 50,000 watts as a clear channel (class A) station, using a slightly directional antenna solely for the purpose of improving reception in downtown Montreal.

The station had carried an all-news format since December 1999, identifying itself as Info 690. Before that date, the station was known as CKVL and was on 850 kHz; it then had a news/talk format. Along with longtime English-language sister station CINW, it ceased operations at exactly 7:02 p.m. ET on January 29, 2010. Two and a half years later, the 690 AM frequency was reused for sports-formatted station CKGM, which moved to that frequency from the 990 AM frequency.

== History ==
=== Early years ===
CKVL was founded by Jack Tietolman and Corey Thomson and opened on November 3, 1946. The station was originally on 990 kHz, and operated with 1,000 watts as a daytimer. The station was bilingual (French/English), but the majority of programming was in French and it was largely perceived by listeners as a Francophone station. The call sign stood for "Canadian Kilocycle Verdun Lakeshore". Programming on CKVL was varied, as it was then typical, and numerous radio dramas were aired.

An FM sister station, CKVL-FM (CKOI-FM since 1976) was created sometime between 1947 and 1957. In any case, CKVL-FM was a full-time simulcast of CKVL until 1970.

By 1948, CKVL was broadcasting on 980 kHz, and operated 24 hours per day.

In 1954, CKVL moved to 850 kHz and increased its power to 5,000 watts full-time. The 980 kHz frequency would later be re-activated when CKGM went on the air in 1959.

Following the advent of television, the station was forced to redefine itself and some Top 40 programming appeared with Léon Lachance, whose show was highly popular with both linguistic groups.

CKVL became in January 1958 the first privately owned station in Montreal and all of Quebec to operate with 50,000 watts daytime (competitor CKAC increased its power to 50,000 watts full-time two months later). The station's nighttime power remained at 5,000 watts, and was only increased to 10,000 watts in the 1960s.

CKVL innovated with the first open line talk show in Quebec in 1959, hosted by "Madame X" (Reine Charrier). Efforts by Jack Tietolman to open a French-language television station failed, as the licence was given to Télé-Métropole (CFTM-TV); that station opened in 1961 and became the flagship of the TVA television network.

=== 1968 to 1992 ===
In 1968, CKVL abandoned its variety format in favour of a hybrid talk/music format, with weekday daytime programming being all-talk with a high proportion of open-line shows, including the famous Jacques Matti / Hélène Fontaine duo and former Liberal (and future Social Credit) politician Yvon Dupuis as morningman. Music programming mixing Top 40 hits with Adult contemporary music completed the schedule. The proportion of talk shows would increase over the next years, but at least some music would remain until 1999.

Sister station CKVL-FM started its own programming in 1970, using an automated oldies format.

Logo used by CKVL for much of the 1970s and 1980s.

New efforts by owner Jack Tietolman to get a television licence failed again in 1974. A licence was attributed by the Canadian Radio-television and Telecommunications Commission (CRTC) to another group (Télé Inter-Cité Québec Ltée), which managed to go bankrupt before even getting the station on the air. That same year, CKVL introduced all-news programming for its AM and PM drives (using respectively the names "Québec-matin" and "Québec-soir"), but high costs and less-than-satisfactory results provoked the end of that experiment the following year.

A long labour strike affected programming in 1976. CKVL also officially became a unilingual French station that year, as the CRTC forbade bilingualism on privately owned radio stations (unless a station would get a special dispensation).

Starting in 1978, CKVL started to lose money, due to declining listening combined with high labour costs. After being one of the most listened-to stations in Montreal in the 1950s and 1960s, strong competition from CKAC (and to a lesser extent from CJMS and FM stations) combined with the station's signal being inaudible at night in many parts of the Montreal market due to urban sprawl, resulted in a long decline in BBM ratings which would, along with corresponding financial losses, last until 1990.

In 1979, CKVL tried to replace its Top 40/AC music programming with country music. That experiment failed and country music was later replaced with the "Solid Gold" concept, initially mixing current hits with oldies and subsequently moving to a more traditional oldies format.

In 1981, CKVL committed a famous April Fool's hoax as it claimed that Prime Minister Pierre Trudeau had announced his resignation, and got an imitator posing as Trudeau to do an "exclusive interview" in which "Trudeau" claimed he was tired of dealing with political issues such as the Constitution and also "le poisson de Terre-Neuve" ("fish from Newfoundland"; April's Fool day is known in French as "Poisson d'Avril" -- "Fish of April"). Seemingly unoriginal at first glance, the prank was made famous by the fact that it succeeded in catching provincial Liberal leader Claude Ryan off-guard, as he quickly congratulated Trudeau for his long career, this right in the middle of a provincial election campaign.

CKVL converted to AM stereo on February 27, 1989, but technical difficulties resulted in it never being properly implemented. The station would revert to mono in 1995.

The station implemented drastic budget cuts in 1990, which resulted in the number of unionized employees fall from 76 to 18, although CKVL did manage to recruit a new morningman by poaching Pierre Pascau from CKAC. The station's newsroom was also closed, effective in May 1991, with news being subsequently supplied by the Canadian Press NTR audio service. While these changes helped to stop financial losses, they would prove insufficient to actually get the station profitable.

=== Post-Tietolman era ===
The last CKVL logo; used from 1992 to 1999.

CKVL and sister station CKOI-FM were sold to Metromedia CMR in 1992. That company, owned by Pierre Arcand and Pierre Béland, already owned CIQC and CFQR-FM—two stations that Jack Tietolman coincidentally tried to buy in 1963, with approval being refused by governmental authorities. One of Tietolman's last acts as owner was to sign controversial host André Arthur as midday host on CKVL.

CKVL applied to move to FM on 95.1 MHz in 1996, despite the fact that the CRTC still generally forbade owners at the time to operate more than one FM station per market, in an attempt to solve its coverage problems. The application was denied on July 4, 1997, and the 95.1 MHz frequency was awarded to Société Radio-Canada, which moved CBF there from its 690 kHz clear channel frequency.

Some important programming changes were implemented in 1998. André Arthur became morningman in January (he also continued to be heard during middays). In July, evening host Roger Drolet was fired, and Gaétan Bacon was hired to do an oldies music show during weekday afternoons.

Later that year, CKVL applied to move to 690 kHz. CKVL changed its plans numerous times regarding the future format of the station: initially, no particular change was planned, then the station planned to move to a news-focused talk format, and the day public audiences began, plans were changed again and were now to implement a traditional all-news format similar to the one of WINS in New York City or CFTR in Toronto. The application was officially approved by the CRTC on June 21, 1999. As the CRTC usually rejects applications that are constantly modified, and given the history of hostility between the CRTC and André Arthur, there was strong speculation that the CRTC wanted CKVL to fire Arthur as a condition to grant the frequency change (his contract would be bought back by the station on October 20, 1999).

=== All-news era ===
Original Info 690 logo, used from 1999 to 2007.

CKVL's regular programming ceased unceremoniously with an infomercial that ended at midnight on Monday, December 13, 1999. The new all-news format began 35 hours later (on December 14, at 11 a.m.) on the 690 kHz frequency from brand-new studios located in downtown Montreal. The station concurrently changed its call sign to CINF, but would identify itself on the air as "Info 690". The station's anglophone AM sister station underwent similar changes at the very same time: CIQC became officially known as CINW (940 News), that station's frequency was changed from 600 kHz to 940 kHz, and an all-news format was also implemented to replace the previous CIQC news/talk format.

Info 690 broadcasts traffic reports every 9 minutes with updates on the helicopter, followed by weather. Pierre Nadeau was the morning anchor of this station.

The old 850 kHz signal remained on the air as a temporary simulcast until it was shut down on Easter Sunday, 2000 (April 23) around 8:30 p.m.. The 850 kHz frequency has not been re-activated in the Montreal area. While many different applications have been made for new AM stations since that time, all applicants (either successful or not) asked for other frequencies, namely 650, 1400, 1410, 1450, 1570, 1610, 1650 and 1690 kHz. However, in June 2013, Tietolman-Tetrault-Pancholy Media was granted a construction permit for a new station to occupy the 850 kHz frequency, to air a French-language sports-talk format. The same company holds permits for two more new stations occupying formerly used frequencies in Montreal (600 and 940 kHz).

In 2001, Metromedia CMR sold all its radio properties (including CINF) to Corus Entertainment.

On January 1, 2002, the station's city of licence became Montreal (it had always officially been Verdun until then), as a result of forced municipal mergers which made Verdun a Montreal borough.

After Corus Entertainment acquired CKAC in 2005, CINF began to supply news bulletins to its long-time competitor, as the CKAC newsroom was closed for budgetary reasons on May 30, 2005. In September 2005, the all-news format of anglophone sister station CINW was abandoned in favour of news/talk, but the all-news format remained on CINF.

In February 2009, Corus announced a restructuring plan to address massive financial losses accumulated at the station since the 1999 format change. Info 690 lost over 7 million dollars over the last eight years and as a result twelve jobs were eliminated.

=== Closure ===
On January 29, 2010, Corus announced it would shut down CINF, along with sister AM station CINW (the latter being the descendant of the first radio station in Canada), citing that the stations were unprofitable.

At 10 a.m., an audio loop of Yves Bombardier, General Manager of CINF, CHMP and CKAC, informed listeners that CINF was closing down permanently, and inviting listeners to tune into CHMP. CINW would air a similar audio loop for their own listeners.

At 7 p.m. both stations went dark entirely; the licenses for both stations was returned to the CRTC for cancellation. On June 8, 2010, the CRTC approved the revocation of both licences.

Later that year, Cogeco acquired Corus' Quebec stations; the sale included the transmitter sites and equipment in Kahnawake used for CINF and CINW, but not the licenses, as they were submitted to the CRTC for cancellation.

=== 690 after CINF ===
In May 2011, Cogeco announced that they have planned to sign on two new AM traffic information radio stations for the Montreal area, in conjunction with Transports Québec. The French language service was to broadcast at 690 kHz, the former frequency for CINF. Both stations were expected to sign on in fall 2011, with broadcast hours from 4:30 a.m. to 1 a.m. on weekdays, and from 6 a.m. to 1 a.m. on weekends. While new licenses were to have been issued for both stations, the new licensee for the new station is "Metromedia CMR Broadcasting Inc.", which was the prior licensee for CINF. On July 8, 2011, these applications for 690 kHz and 940 kHz were withdrawn to a later date. On July 29, 2011, the CRTC began taking other applications for the two frequencies, which left Cogeco's plans for the stations in doubt. On September 2, 2011, it was announced that Cogeco's former sports radio station, CKAC, will assume the all-traffic format, beginning September 6, 2011, leading to Cogeco dropping its bid for 690.

On September 7, 2011, the CRTC announced the applicants for the 690 frequency: Paul Tietolman (the son of Jack Tietolman), for a francophone news-talk format; Evanov Communications, for a francophone LGBT-based radio station; and Bell Media, as a new frequency for CKGM, replacing its signal at 990 kHz.

On November 21, 2011, CKGM's relocation from 990 to 690 was approved by the CRTC; after the move is made, Evanov was assigned the 990 frequency for their station, CHRF. CKGM commenced broadcasting on 690 on September 4, 2012, simulcasting its programming on 990 until December 1, 2012.
