= Mont Bellevue =

Mountain in Quebec, Canada

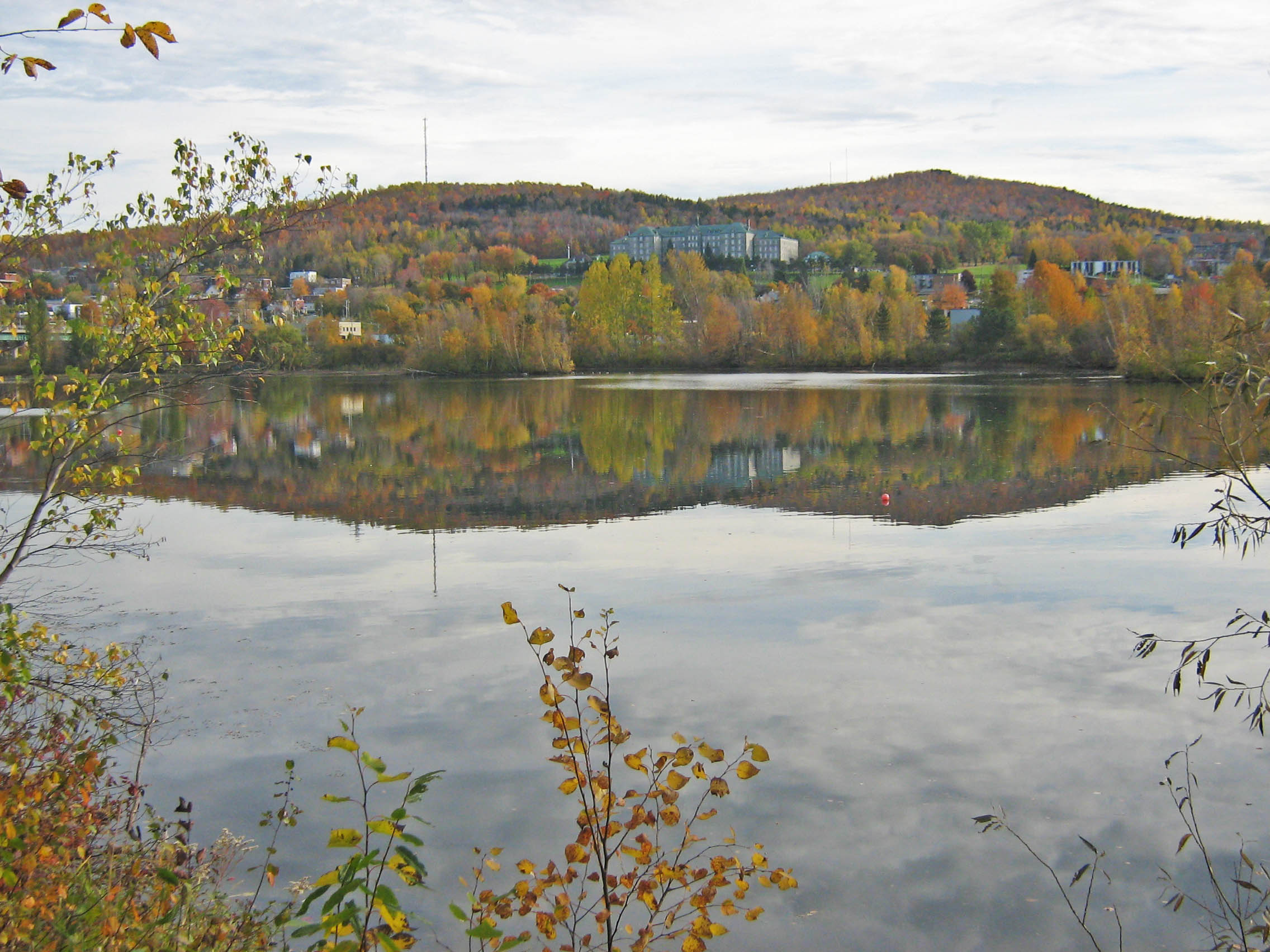
- View of Mounts Bellevue and John-S.-Bourque from across the Magog River

Highest point
- Elevation: 333 m (1,093 ft)
- Parent peak: John-S.-Bourque
- Coordinates: 45°22′49″N 71°54′51″W

Geography
- Location within Southern Quebec
- Location: Sherbrooke, Quebec, Canada
- Parent range: Green Mountains
- Topo map: NTS 21E5 Sherbrooke

Climbing
- Easiest route: hiking or cycling

Mont Bellevue (French: [mɔ̃ bɛlvy]) is a peak standing 333 m (1,093 ft), situated in Mont-Bellevue Park located in the borough of Mont-Bellevue in Sherbrooke, Quebec. The park also covers Mont Bellevue's parent peak, Mont John-S.-Bourque (elevation: 365 m (1,198 ft)), as well as 200 ha (490 acres) of land, 30 km (19 mi) of trails, and several different types of ecosystems. Claiming 20% of the total park land, it is the largest park in Sherbrooke.

== Etymology ==
Belle vue translates to "beautiful view" in English. The mountain, its park, and the borough in which it lies are named after "the magnificent landscape one discovers at its summit."

== Bedrock ==
Mont Bellevue is composed mainly of pyroclastic rock indicative of violent volcanic eruptions.

== History ==
The Université de Sherbrooke, built in 1954, originally used the land for sports, recreation, education, and research. In 1959, the City of Sherbrooke constructed the first ski lift on the mountain, signaling the beginning of the development of Mont Bellevue for public recreational purposes. Between 1959 and 1975, the city reserved 45 hectares of land for alpine skiing, tennis, archery, and various trails.

In 1976, the City of Sherbrooke undertook park management and maintenance. To this day, the City of Sherbrooke continues to improve the park with consideration for the environment through the Regroupement du Mont Bellevue organization.

In August 2013, Mont Bellevue was one of the venues for the Canada Games. In preparation for the event, the Club de vélo de montagne de Sherbrooke was granted CA $300,000 for the improvement of the park's mountain bike course.

== Recreation ==
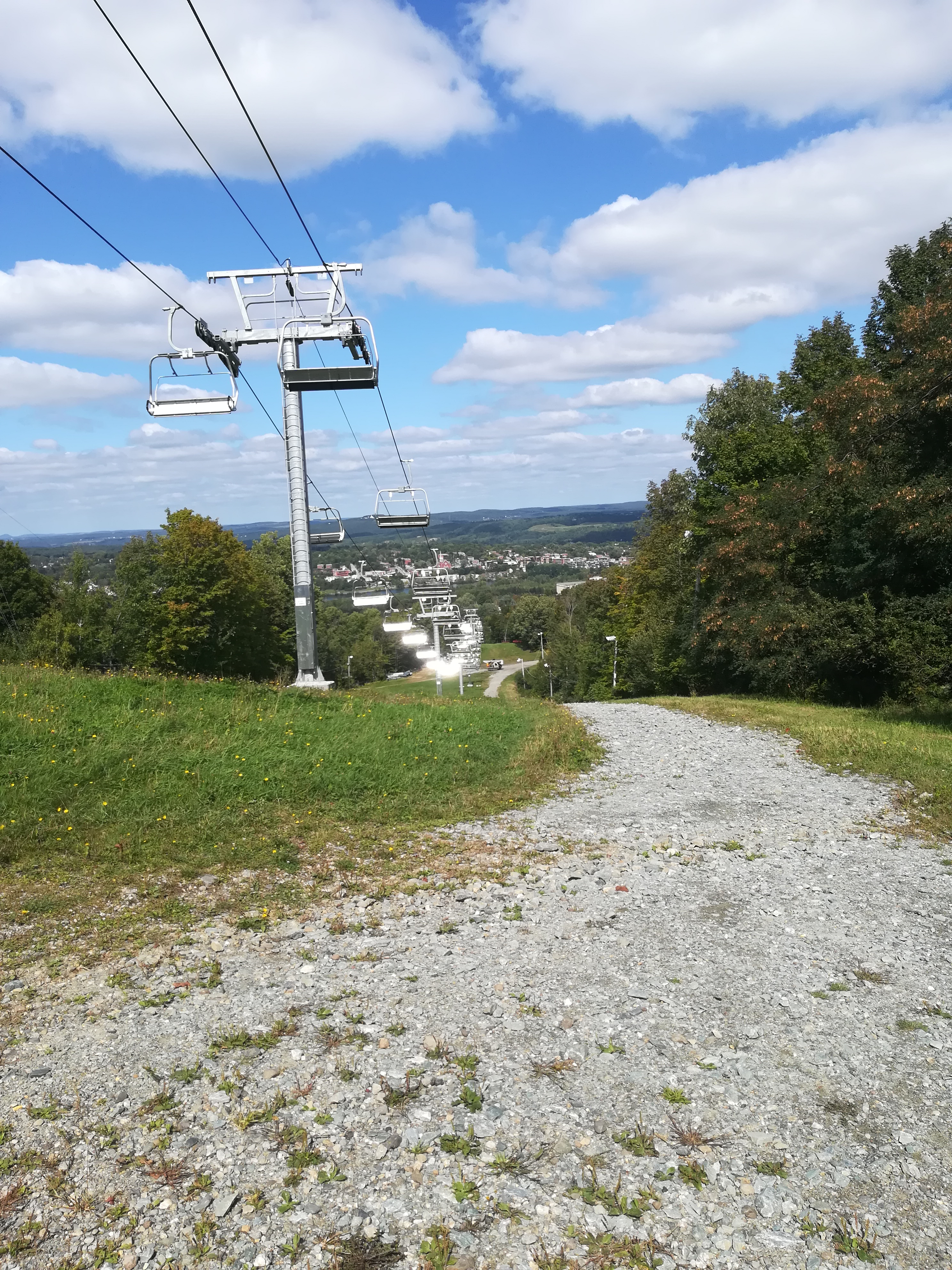

Mont Bellevue houses a small alpine skiing station that has six tracks and a chalet at which visitors may rent skiing, snowboarding, or snowshoeing equipment. Other winter activities available in the park include cross-country skiing, winter walking, and snow tubing. Summer visitors may participate in hiking, mountain biking, cycling, archery, tennis, jogging, and geocaching.

== Wildlife ==
Wildlife observers often view deer, squirrels, groundhogs and chipmunks in the park. Less commonly observed mammals include porcupine, skunks, foxes and raccoons. Among the many types of avian species in the mountain, birders may view blue jays, cardinals, wood thrush, veery, and ruffed grouse. Reptiles on the mountain include brown snakes and garter snakes, while numerous types of amphibians, molluscs, and insects also occupy the space.

=== Flora ===
A variety of wildflowers, ferns, trees, edible plants, and fungus inhabit the mountain.

==== Flowers ====
- Trout lilies
- Pink turtlehead
- Lily of the valley
- Foamflower
- Blue cohosh
- Pink streptope
- Solomon's seal
- Painted trillium
- Pink lady's slipper
- Jack-in-the-pulpit
- Common hemp-nettle
- Euphrasia
- Silvery cinquefoil
- Common mullein
- Indian pipe
- Pinesap
- Ground pine

==== Fruits and vegetables ====
- Ramps
- Horseradish
- Blueberry
- Juneberry
- Raspberry and wineberry
- Nannyberry
- Blackberry
- Chokecherry
- Apple
- Wild strawberry
- Elderberry

==== Trees ====
- Striped maple
- American basswood

=== Invasive species ===
Buckthorn, honeysuckle, and Japanese knotweed are among the invasive plants on the mountain.

==== Black slug ====
The black slug (French: limace géante, limace noire) is an invasive pest native to Europe that was transported to the area during the construction of the Université de Sherbrooke in the 1950s. Windows imported from England in wooden crates padded with straw are thought to have contained eggs from the pest.

From there, they took to the Mont Bellevue Park, where the soil humidity is conducive to their locomotion, and where their massive size and lack of shell means they easily outcompete native species. The black slug also has few natural predators in North America, meaning it is a threat to the stability of the ecosystems on the mountain.

There is concern that the molluscs might spread to other parts of town via accidental transportation by automobiles that stay for long periods of time in the Mont Bellevue or university parking areas.

===== Eradication efforts =====
In 2008, residents of the Mont-Bellevue and Mont-Sainte-Anne sectors surrounding the park reported major issues with the critters, who are known for decimating gardens. City councillors deferred their complaints to provincial ministers.

In early 2009, the city drew up plans to pursue the eradication of the slugs, granting CA $12,000 to Environtel 3000 so the company could analyze the scope and distribution of the pests. However, that summer saw yet another worrisome abundance of the pest.

The report revealed that 15-20% of the slugs begin their reproductive cycle early, allowing for the growth of two generations per year instead of one. Warm autumns and winters, as well as wet springs and summers, promote the growth of the slug population.

Following the report, the city began the production of informative brochures detailing the steps homeowners can take to get rid of the pests on their properties.
