= CHMP-FM =

Radio station in Longueuil

Coordinates: 45°30′20″N 73°35′30″W

- Longueuil, Quebec; Canada
- Broadcast area: Greater Montreal
- Frequency: 98.5 MHz
- Branding: 98,5 FM

Programming
- Language: French
- Format: talk/sports

Ownership
- Owner: Cogeco; (Cogeco Diffusion Acquisitions Inc.)
- Sister stations: CKBE-FM, CKAC, CKOI-FM, CFGL-FM

History
- First air date: April 9, 1977
- Former call signs: CIEL-FM (1977–2000); CKOO-FM (2000–2004)
- Call sign meaning: Montréal Parlé ("Montreal Talks" in French)

Technical information
- Class: C1
- ERP: 100,000 watts
- HAAT: 298.9 metres (981 ft)

Links
- Webcast: Listen Live
- Website: www.985fm.ca

CHMP-FM (98.5 MHz) is a French language talk radio station serving the Greater Montreal Area and licensed to the off-Island suburb of Longueuil. Owned and operated by Cogeco, it broadcasts with an effective radiated power (ERP) of 100,000 watts as a Class C1 station, using an omnidirectional antenna atop Mount Royal, at 298.9 metres (981 ft) in height above average terrain (HAAT). CHMP's studios and offices are located at Place Bonaventure in downtown Montreal.

The station identifies itself as 98,5 FM and is one of the few full-time FM talk stations in North America to broadcast in stereo. The station has a few music blocks, during weekends.

Notable personalities include popular morning drive time host Paul Arcand, midday host and former Minister responsible for Democratic Institutions and Active Citizenship in 2012 under Pauline Marois, Bernard Drainville, weekend morning host Paul Houde, former NHL referee and late-night sports talk host Ron Fournier and popular journalist Patrick Lagacé, who hosts the afternoon drive time show. Former mayor of Montreal's Le Plateau-Mont-Royal district and environmentalist Luc Ferrandez and former Mulroney government diplomat Luc Lavoie also appear daily as collaborators. Gilles Proulx was also heard on the station from 2004 until his retirement on August 7, 2008.

== History ==
=== CIEL-FM ===
In 1976, Stephane Venne applied for the license to operate a new station on the FM dial in Longueuil. He initially wanted 93.5 MHz (Channel 228) with a power of 10,000 watts, but this frequency was granted to CBC Radio for CBM-FM. On January 20, 1977, Radio MF CIEL (1976) Inc. got permission to use call sign CIEL-FM ("Ciel" is French for "sky"). The station went on the air April 9, 1977 with 10,000 watts, airing a French-language adult contemporary radio format. Stephane Venne was the general manager and program director.

On October 17, 1978, Radio MF CIEL (1976) was sold to Stereo Laval Inc which also owned CFGL-FM in Laval. In 1981, Stereo Laval was purchased by Placements Roland Saucier Inc. and ownership of CIEL was transferred to a holding entity called Radio MF CIEL (1981) Inc.

In 1987, CIEL moved its antenna from Mont Saint-Bruno to Mount Royal and reduced its power from 100,000 watts to 45,000 watts, and then to 40,800 in 1988.

In the early 1990s, CIEL changed to French hot adult contemporary as the softer AC format was filled by rivals CFGL-FM and CITE-FM

Throughout its 23 years with the CIEL-FM call sign, the station's studios were located on St-Charles Street in Old Longueuil, but the station served the entire Greater Montreal area.

=== Cool FM ===
In 1998, owner Jean-Pierre Coallier sold CIEL-FM to Metromedia CMR. On August 8, 2000, the station's call letters were changed to CKOO-FM as it switched to a modern rock format branded as Cool FM. (Even though the station broadcast in French, it used the English word "cool" to identify itself.) CKOO's offices and studios moved from Longueuil to Verdun in 1999. In 2001, the format flipped to mainstream rock when Corus Entertainment acquired the station, and the format was changed again to classic rock in 2003. The "Cool" branding continued to be used although the various rock formats failed to attract many listeners. CKOO wanted to become the first French-language rock station in the Montreal area. It took inspiration from CHOI-FM in Quebec City, a successful rock station broadcasting in French. (For some years in the 1970s and 80s, CHOM-FM had broadcast progressive rock in both English and French but was never a full-time French rock station.)

With rock music failing to gain traction in Montreal, Corus announced on November 27, 2003, that the station would flip to a talk format starting in 2004. Following the announcement, all "Cool" programs were cancelled and the station played continuous Christmas music for the rest of the year.

=== CHMP-FM ===
CHMP-FM's original logo from 2004 to 2011.

On January 5, 2004, the new talk format made its debut, with the CHMP-FM call sign and the branding 98,5 FM, Le FM parlé de Montréal. The CHMP-FM call letters became official by spring 2004.

With Paul Arcand as host, 98,5 FM rapidly climbed to the top of the Montreal ratings with 1,133,000 listeners and 120,000 visitors on its website.

CHMP is the last station to broadcast from the legendary 211 Gordon Avenue studios in Verdun, which had been home to CKVL and CKOI-FM for decades. The station moved to new studios in Place Bonaventure in Downtown Montreal on July 29, 2006. The old 211 Gordon Avenue studios were demolished in December 2006.

From February 2005 until April 1, 2007, the station had an all-talk format only during Canadian Radio-television and Telecommunications Commission (CRTC) regulated hours, while playing music at night. The station wanted to switch to an all-talk format beginning in January 2004 but was unable to do so because of CRTC regulations limiting talk shows on the FM band, instead airing a mix of talk and classic hits in 2004 and early 2005.

On April 2, 2007, the station began broadcasting a full-time talk format, except for weekends when Souvenirs Garantis classic hits programming was heard.

On April 30, 2010, it was announced that all Corus Québec stations, including CHMP, would be sold to Cogeco for $80 million, pending CRTC approval.

On December 17, 2010, the CRTC approved the sale of most of Corus' radio stations in Quebec, including CHMP, to Cogeco. CHMP formally became a Cogeco station on February 1, 2011.

CHMP-FM is now the producer of the Cogeco Nouvelles news bulletins for the French-language stations in the Cogeco chain. Originally known as CorusNouvelles, the station assumed this task for the Corus Québec network following the closure of sister station CINF in January 2010.

In Fall 2011, CHMP-FM overtook sister adult contemporary station CFGL-FM as the most-listened-to North American radio station broadcasting in the French language.

Since 2011, CHMP has been the Francophone flagship radio station of the NHL's Montreal Canadiens. It began simulcasting Canadiens games in 2007 to make up for sister station CKAC's reduced nighttime coverage. It became the sole flagship in 2011 after CKAC changed to a Francophone traffic format. Also since 2011, CHMP has been the Francophone outlet for the Canadian Football League's Montreal Alouettes and Major League Soccer's Montreal Impact (which it lost to sports competitor CKLX-FM in 2021).

CHMP-FM's former logo from 2012 to 2016.

On November 29, 2013, the CRTC approved an application for transmitter improvements, with the station increasing its power from 40,800 watts to 100,000 watts, and slightly decreasing its antenna height from 301.5 to 298.9 metres (989 to 981 ft) HAAT.

== Additional notes ==
Another station, CJRM-FM, previously used the 98.5 MHz frequency in Montreal during the late 1960s.

The call sign CIEL-FM has since 2001 been used by a station in Rivière-du-Loup formerly known as CJFP-FM.
