= Paul Arcand =

Canadian radio host

Paul Arcand (born May 12, 1960) is a Canadian radio host, journalist and film producer, best known as a longtime morning talk radio host on CHMP-FM in Montreal, Quebec, until his retirement in 2024.

Arcand was born in Saint-Hyacinthe, Quebec and attended the Séminaire de Saint-Hyacinthe. He began his career with CKBS in St. Hyacinthe in 1978 as a journalist. He was hired by Montreal station CKVL in 1980, and moved to the old CJMS the following year. He would become news director of CJMS and the Radiomutuel network in 1985, and in addition became the PM drive show host in 1988.

He made his debut as morning man in 1990. When CJMS was closed as part of the Télémédia/Radiomutuel merger in 1994, he moved to CKAC.

In 2000, he was hired by the TVA television network for a weekly show consisting of a half-an-hour interview. The program, simply titled "Arcand", achieved great popularity and lasted until April 2005.

Arcand announced his departure from CKAC in October 2003, and announced he was joining CKOO-FM (now CHMP-FM) a few weeks later as part of that station's new news/talk format, but due to legal requirements he was forced to remain on CKAC until the end of the Spring 2004 BBM ratings period.

While Arcand is promoted, and largely viewed, as one who "asks real questions" ("celui qui pose les vraies questions"), he is not particularly controversial, and his politics are generally close to the centre of the political spectrum.

He produced in 2005 a documentary called Thieves of Innocence (Les Voleurs d'enfance), which dealt with child abuse in Quebec.
