= CITE-FM-1 =

Radio station in Sherbrooke

Coordinates: 48°18′42.84″N 72°14′30.12″W

- Sherbrooke, Quebec; Canada
- Broadcast area: Estrie; Centre-du-Québec; LanaudièreMontérégie; Montreal; Northeast Kingdom; Coös County, New Hampshire
- Frequency: 102.7 MHz
- Branding: 102,7 Rouge

Programming
- Language: French
- Format: Adult contemporary
- Affiliations: Rouge FM

Ownership
- Owner: Bell Media; (Bell Media Radio)
- Sister stations: CIMO-FM, CFKS-DT

History
- First air date: November 17, 1960
- Former call signs: CHLT-FM (1960–1976); CITE-FM (1976)
- Call sign meaning: Derived from the French word for "city"

Technical information
- Class: C1
- ERP: 92 kW
- HAAT: 594 metres (1,949 ft)
- Repeater: CITE-FM-2 94.5 MHz Sherbrooke

Links
- Webcast: Listen Live
- Website: rougefm.ca/estrie.html

CITE-FM-1 is a French-language radio station located in Sherbrooke, Quebec, Canada.

Owned and operated by Bell Media, it broadcasts on 102.7 MHz with an effective radiated power of 92,000 watts (class C1) using an omnidirectional antenna on Mount Orford. This gives the station an impressive coverage area, as far west as Montreal, and as far south as St. Johnsbury, Vermont and Littleton, New Hampshire. However, it suffers from severe deficiencies in downtown Sherbrooke, most likely due to tall buildings blocking its signal in some areas. As a result, the station also operates a low-power relay in Sherbrooke, CITE-FM-2, which broadcasts on 94.5 MHz with an effective radiated power of 50 watts, also using an omnidirectional antenna.

The station has an adult contemporary format, and is part of the "Rouge FM" (formerly "RockDétente") network which operates across Quebec and Eastern Ontario.

Although the station's call sign suggests it is a relay of CITE-FM in Montreal, it is not actually a relay and programs from Montreal are not more common than on other Rouge FM stations (which have independent call signs). The reason for this irregular call sign is unclear. There is no known record among CRTC decisions suggesting that CITE-FM-1 was ever a full-time relay of CITE-FM in Montreal, or that the proportion of programming coming from Montreal was ever higher than for other Rouge FM stations. However, the station's signal reaches into the Montreal area, and anecdotal observations suggest that a modest but still noticeable number of Montreal-area listeners listen to it rather than CITE-FM. Since it is highly plausible that some of these listeners report ambiguously their listening in Numeris diaries, as a result their listening to the Sherbrooke station would be assigned as per BBM rules to the Montreal station, which may explain the Sherbrooke station's unusual call sign.

CITE-FM-1 started as CHLT-FM in 1960, as it was created as a sister station to CHLT AM (now known as CKOY-FM, which previously used the CHLT-FM calls after its move from AM to FM), also in Sherbrooke. Since early 2005, they are no longer sister stations, as CKOY-FM is now owned by Cogeco. CITE-FM-1 was briefly known as CITE-FM in 1977, just before CITE-FM in Montreal started to broadcast.

On August 28, 1976, CHLT-FM became CITE-FM.

CITE-FM-1's last RockDétente-era logo; used from 2004 until August 2011

On August 18, 2011, at 4:00 p.m. EDT, all "RockDétente" stations, including CITE-FM-1, rebranded as Rouge FM. The last song under "RockDétente" was "Pour que tu m'aimes encore" by Celine Dion, followed by a tribute of the branding. The first song under "Rouge" was "I Gotta Feeling" by Black Eyed Peas.

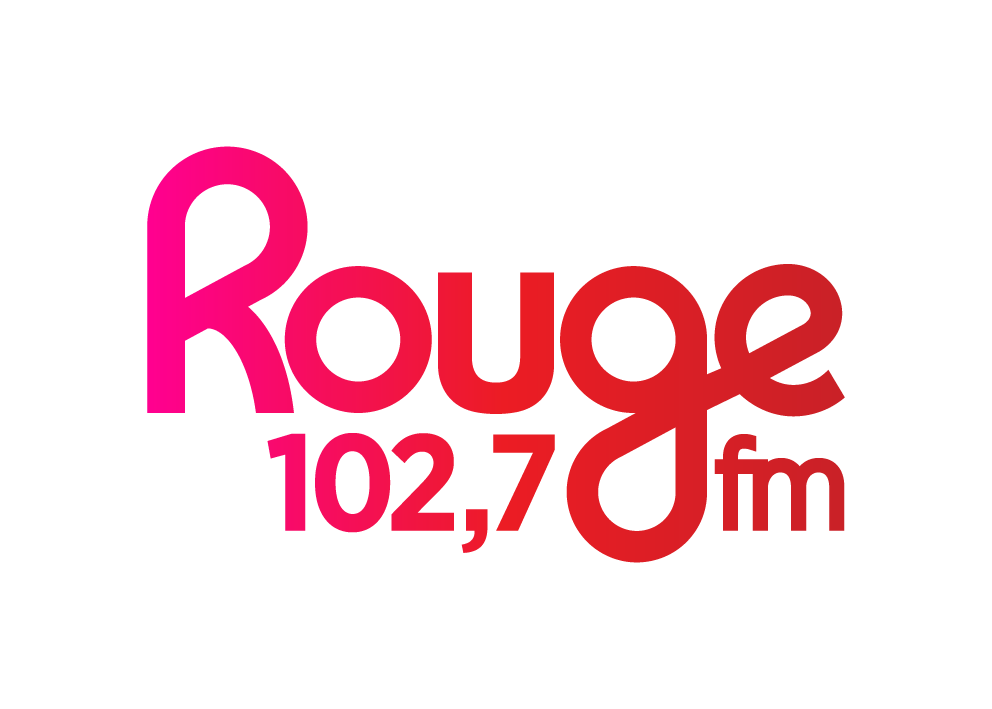
CITE-FM-1's first Rouge FM-era logo; used from August 2011 until August 2017
