= Corus Québec =

Canadian news/talk radio network

Corus Québec, formerly Radiomédia, was a French-language Canadian news/talk radio network serving most of Quebec. The network and most of its affiliates were owned by Toronto-based Corus Entertainment.

== Stations ==
The network had four co-flagships:

- CFOM-FM 102.9 in Quebec City for Souvenirs Garantis Classic hits programming
- CHMP-FM 98.5 in Montreal (officially licensed to Longueuil) for talk programming
- CKAC 730 AM in Montreal for sports talk
- CINF 690 AM Montreal for all-news radio

Other stations included:

- CFEL-FM 102.1 in Lévis
- CIME-FM 103.9 in Saint-Jérôme
- CJRC-FM 104.7 in Gatineau
- CHLT-FM 107.7 in Sherbrooke
- CHLN-FM 106.9 in Trois-Rivières

On February 5, 2009, it was announced that these four stations would introduce a classic hits music format similar to the one currently used at CFOM-FM 102.9 in Quebec City, effective March 28. However, according to the Canadian Radio-television and Telecommunications Commission (CRTC) website, Corus intends to continue to operate those stations under a news/talk format for CRTC regulatory purposes, as the new music programming will air only from 10 a.m. to 4 p.m. weekdays and 9 a.m. to 6 p.m. on weekends.

Stations not owned and operated by Corus Entertainment can also be affiliates, such as CKRS-FM 98.3 in Saguenay, CFYX-FM 93.3 in Rimouski, CHNC-FM 107.1 in New Carlisle and CFGT-FM 104.5 in Alma. CHRC 800 AM in Quebec City was previously part of the Corus Québec network, but the station was sold in 2008 by Corus to a group of local businessmen; it no longer has any links with Corus. CKRS-FM was sold in November 2010 to a local group, Radio Saguenay; it is unknown if any Corus Québec programming still airs on that station.

== Creation of Radiomédia ==
The Radiomédia network was created to succeed to the now-defunct Télémédia and Radiomutuel networks, which merged on September 30, 1994. This merger resulted in six AM stations closing in Quebec on that very same day at 6 p.m. (Eastern Daylight Time), and is referred to in Quebec radio circles as "le vendredi noir" ("Black Friday").

The six AM stations closed were :

- CJMS 1280 AM in Montreal (Radiomutuel)
- CJRP 1060 AM in Quebec City (Radiomutuel)
- CKCH 970 AM in Gatineau (Télémédia)
- CJRS 1510 AM in Sherbrooke (Radiomutuel)
- CJTR 1140 AM in Trois-Rivières (Radiomutuel)
- CJMT 1420 AM in Chicoutimi (Télémédia)

In each case, the station with the best signal remained open and the other one was closed. While in most markets the station that remained open was also both the oldest and the more successful according to recent BBM ratings, this was not the case everywhere—CJTR in Trois-Rivières had recently surpassed CHLN in ratings for the first time in many years, and CKCH in Gatineau (opened in 1933) had much more of a history than CJRC, which opened only in 1968.

The Radiomédia network, along with CKAC in Montreal and CHRC in Quebec City, were now owned in equal shares by Telemedia and Radiomutuel. Telemedia retained full ownership of CHLT in Sherbrooke and CHLN in Trois-Rivières, while Radiomutuel retained full ownership of CJRC in Gatineau and CKRS in Saguenay. Both companies continued to compete against each other on the FM dial, with Telemedia still owning the RockDétente network and Radiomutuel owning the Énergie network, this while both FM networks were now getting their news services from the Radiomédia newsrooms.

== Change to Corus Québec ==
After Astral Media (successor to Radiomutuel) bought all Telemedia Quebec radio properties in 2001, it was forced by the Competition Bureau to sell their AM stations due to concentration of ownership concerns. After two failed attempts (see article on CKAC for more details), a deal with Corus Entertainment was finally approved in early 2005 and took effect in May of that year.

Corus Entertainment, which already owned all-news station CINF (Info 690) in Montreal, promptly renamed Radiomédia as Corus Québec, and simultaneously dismantled the local CKAC newsroom, even though that newsroom was much more respected by listeners than the one from Info 690. News bulletins on the Corus Québec network were now provided by CorusNouvelles, which consists of the old Radiomédia team outside of Montreal combined with the Info 690 team in Montreal. Production of CorusNouvelles would shift to CHMP-FM in January 2010, following the closure of CINF and its English-language sister station, CINW 940 AM.

== Sale to Cogeco ==
On April 30, 2010, it was announced that all Corus Québec stations, with the exception of CKRS, will be sold to Cogeco for $80 million, pending CRTC approval. Corus's reason for the sale is that their Quebec radio stations are less profitable than their stations in other parts of Canada. However, Cogeco must either apply with the CRTC for an exemption from the common ownership policy, or sell off some of these (or their own) stations as they will be over the maximum allowable number of stations in Montreal, Quebec City, and Sherbrooke.

On June 25, it was reported that Corus has agreed to sell CKRS to Radio Saguenay, a local business group; the sale of that station was approved by the CRTC in November 2010.

The sale of the Corus Québec stations to Cogeco has been approved by the CRTC on December 17, 2010, on the condition that Cogeco-owned CJEC-FM and Corus-owned CFEL-FM and CKOY-FM (since re-called CJTS-FM) be sold to another party by December 2011. On November 9, 2011, it was announced that Cogeco would sell CFEL-FM and CJEC-FM to Leclerc Communication Inc., a company owned by Quebec City businessman Jacques Leclerc, owner of Laura Secord Chocolates and Biscuits Leclerc. CJTS-FM would cease operations on December 6, 2011, when Cogeco was unable to find a buyer for the station by the deadline.

The CorusNouvelles news service will also be converted to a new division, Cogeco Nouvelles, with CHMP-FM being the flagship.

On January 13, 2011, competing broadcaster Astral Media announced that they will seek legal action to stop the sale of these stations to Cogeco, citing the fact that it would own more stations than Astral in the Montreal market, making the competition unfair. Cogeco chief executive Louis Audet said that he expects the transaction to close by February 1, and that the case filed by Astral is "without merit and the company will vigorously challenge them with a view to having them dismissed by the court."

== See also ==
- Quoi de Neuf
