= Mont-Bellevue, Quebec =

Coordinates: 45°22′34″N 71°52′30.4″W

Mont-Bellevue
- Borough
- Borough of Sherbrooke
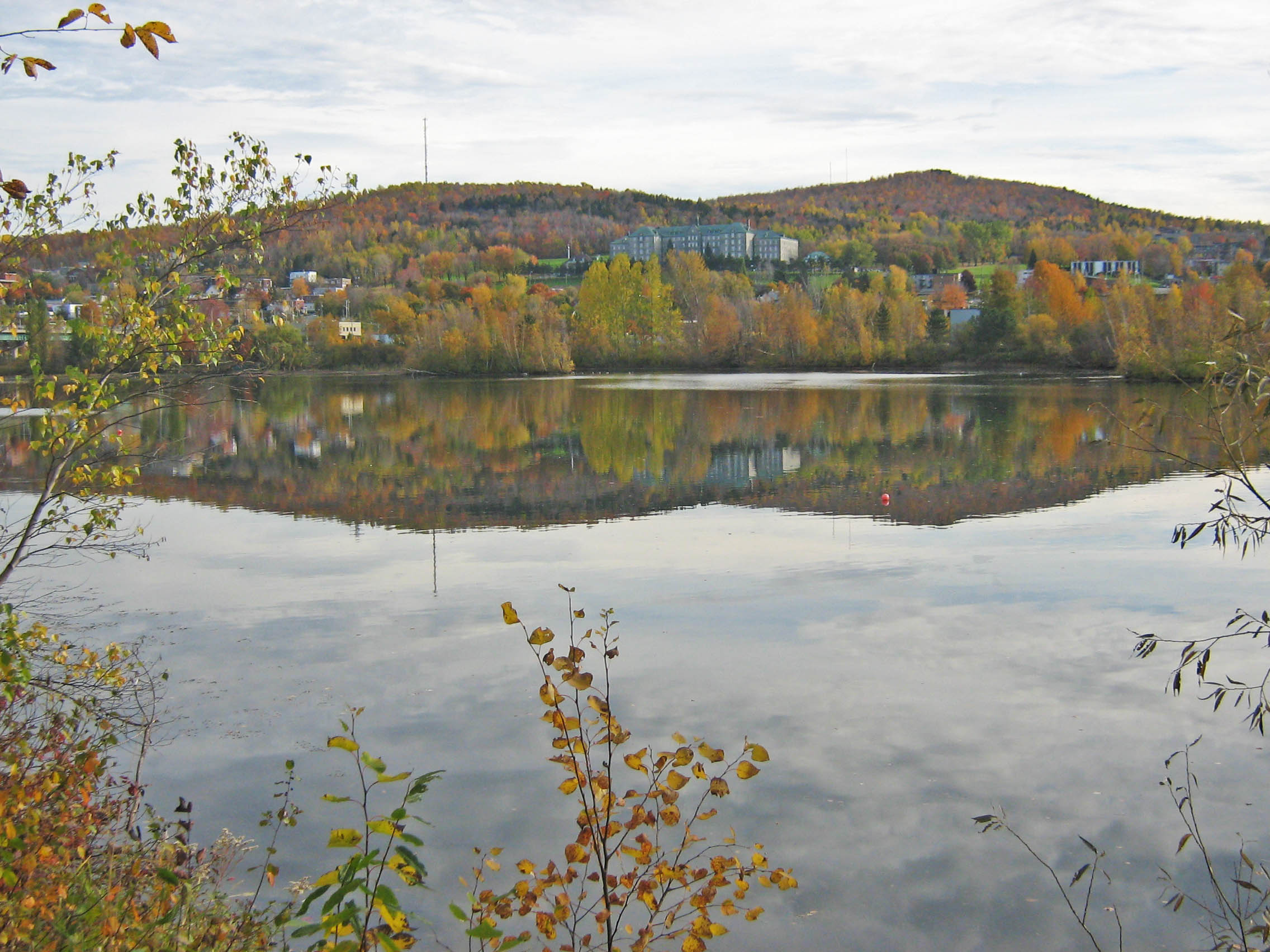
- Mount Bellevue

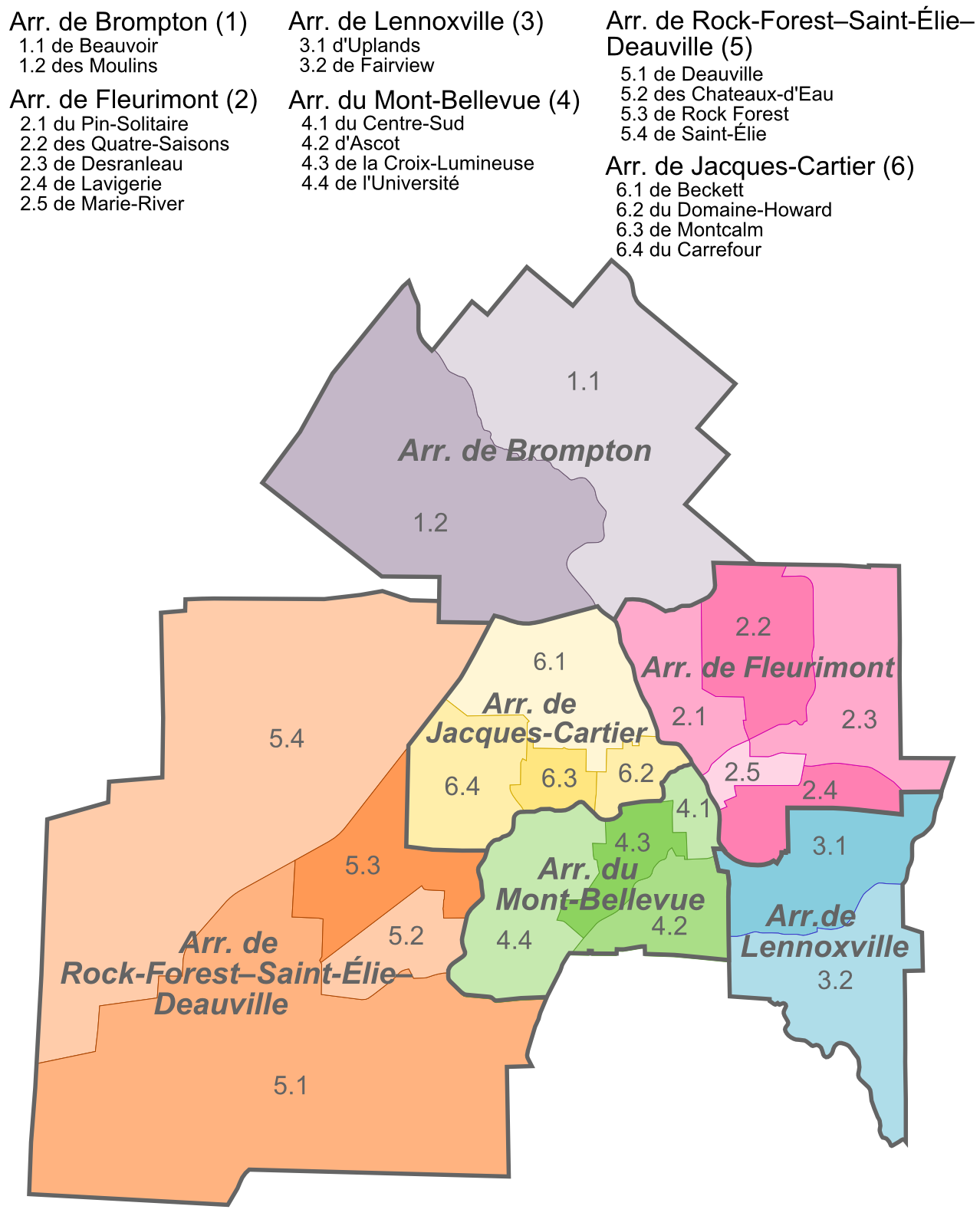
- Country: Canada
- Province: Quebec
- Region: Estrie
- RCM: Sherbrooke
- Merged: January 1, 2002

Government
  - City councillors: Nicole A. Gagnon; Serge Paquin; Robert Pouliot; Jean-François Rouleau

Area
  - Land: 28.5 km^{2} (11.0 sq mi)

Population (2009)
  - Total: 31,042
  - Density: 1,089.19/km^{2} (2,821.0/sq mi)
- Time zone: UTC-5 (EST)
- Area code: 819
- Website: Borough of Mont-Bellevue

Mont-Bellevue (French pronunciation: [mɔ̃ bɛlvy]) is an arrondissement, or borough, of the city of Sherbrooke, Quebec, Canada. It comprises the former town of Ascot and the southern portion of pre-amalgamation Sherbrooke. The eponymous mountain forms Mont-Bellevue Park in the city centre. The borough is represented by four councillors on the Sherbrooke City Council.
