= CKYK-FM =

Radio station in Alma, Quebec

Coordinates: 48°36′04″N 70°49′44″W

- Alma, Quebec; Canada
- Broadcast area: Saguenay–Lac-Saint-Jean
- Frequency: 95.7 MHz
- Branding: 95.7 KYK

Programming
- Format: Talk radio/Sports/Rock
- Affiliations: Montreal Canadiens

Ownership
- Owner: Cogeco

History
- First air date: 1993

Technical information
- Class: C
- ERP: 100 kW
- HAAT: 554.5 metres (1,819 ft)

Links
- Website: www.957kyk.com

CKYK-FM is a French-language, Canadian radio station located in Saguenay, Quebec, but the station's official city of license is Alma.

Owned and operated by Cogeco following its 2018 acquisition of most of the stations formerly owned by RNC Media, it broadcasts on 95.7 MHz using a directional antenna with a peak effective radiated power of 100,000 watts (class C). The station airs an talk radio, sports and rock, branded as KYK Radio X.

The station was launched in 1993 at 95.5 FM, until it moved to its current frequency in 2000.

On April 29, 2008, the station was authorized by the CRTC to add a low-power rebroadcaster on 96.3 FM in downtown Alma.

Previous logo

By 2011, the station changed to a more active rock format, by adding some classic rock even though the modern rock currents remain on the station.

Today, it airs mostly talk radio format, sports (On the evenings on the weekday and airing Montreal Canadiens on the game day) and rock only on the weekends.
