= CIMO-FM =

Radio station in Magog, Quebec

Coordinates: 45°18′43″N 72°14′30″W

Magog, Quebec; Canada
- Broadcast area: Sherbrooke (Estrie)
- Frequency: 106.1 MHz
- Branding: Énergie 106.1

Programming
- Language: French
- Format: Mainstream rock
- Affiliations: Énergie

Ownership
- Owner: Bell Media; (Bell Media Radio)
- Sister stations: CITE-FM-1, CFKS-DT

History
- First air date: September 9, 1979
- Call sign meaning: "Magog" (broadcast area)

Technical information
- Licensing authority: CRTC
- Class: B
- ERP: 1,600 watts
- HAAT: 593.5 metres (1,947 ft)
- Translator: 106.9 CIMO-FM-1 (Sherbrooke)

Links
- Website: www.radioenergie.ca/estrie.html

CIMO-FM (106.1 MHz) is a French-language radio station licensed to Magog, Quebec, and serving the Sherbrooke region of Estrie. It is owned by Bell Media and it broadcasts a mainstream rock radio format as part of the Énergie network across Quebec.

CIMO-FM has an effective radiated power (ERP) of 1,600 watts as a class B station. It uses an omnidirectional antenna and its tower is atop Mount Orford. Because of coverage deficiencies in downtown Sherbrooke, the station also operates a low-power relay station there, CIMO-FM-1 on 106.9 MHz with an effective radiated power of 22 watts, also using an omnidirectional antenna.

CIMO logo using the last pre-NRJ "Énergie" branding.

== History ==
CIMO-FM signed on the air on September 9, 1979.

In 1987, CIMO was bought by Radiomutuel (predecessor of Astral Media). CIMO became a sister station to the now-defunct CJRS 1510 AM in Sherbrooke. Astral Media was later acquired by Bell Media.

CIMO logo as NRJ
