= CKOI-FM =

Radio station in Montreal

- Montreal, Quebec; Canada
- Broadcast area: Greater Montreal
- Frequency: 96.9 MHz
- Branding: CKOI 96.9

Programming
- Language: French
- Format: Contemporary hit radio

Ownership
- Owner: Cogeco Media (a subsidiary of Cogeco); (Cogeco Diffusion Acquisitions Inc.)
- Sister stations: CFGL-FM; CHMP-FM; CKAC; CKBE-FM

History
- First air date: December 6, 1976 (as CKOI-FM)
- Former call signs: CKVL-FM (1953–1976)
- Call sign meaning: CKOI is an homonym of "C'est quoi?", meaning "What is it?".

Technical information
- Licensing authority: CRTC
- Class: C1
- ERP: 148,000 watts
- HAAT: 276.7 metres (908 ft)
- Transmitter coordinates: 45.5054°N 73.5915°W

Links
- Webcast: Listen live
- Website: www.ckoi.com

CKOI-FM (96.9 FM) is a commercial radio station in Montreal, Quebec, Canada. It airs a French-language contemporary hit radio format and is owned and operated by Cogeco Media, a subsidiary of Cogeco. The studios are in Place Bonaventure at 800 rue de la Gauchetière ouest in Montreal.

CKOI-FM is a Class C1 station. Its transmitter is on Mount Royal with an effective radiated power (ERP) of 148,000 watts using an omnidirectional antenna. Until 2018, it was one of North America's highest-powered FM stations.

== History ==
=== Early years ===
The station's original call sign was CKVL-FM, sister station to CKVL (850 AM). Both stations were located in Verdun, a community just outside Montreal. They identified their city of license as Verdun until 2002.

CKVL-FM was founded by Jack Tietolman and Corey Thomson and probably went on the air at some point between 1947 and 1957. Sources disagree on the date, and at least seven different years have been reported as the station's first air date. The confusion is increased by the fact that there is no known report suggesting that the station went silent for any noticeable period of time after getting on the air, despite this phenomenon being relatively common among 1950s FM stations. In any case, the Canadian Communication Foundation reports the station first signed on in 1947, and that CKVL-FM was confirmed as being on the air in 1957. Broadcasting Yearbook lists the sign-on year as 1953.

The station was originally a full-time FM simulcast of co-owned CKVL. The majority of its programming was in French, although there were some English-language shows.

=== High power ===
By 1962, CKVL-FM increased its power from 10,000 watts to 307,000 watts, using a non-directional antenna on the rooftop of the CIBC Tower in downtown Montreal. It is often believed that this unusual high power was granted as the result of a clerical error by the Canadian Radio-television and Telecommunications Commission (CRTC), but that government organization did not exist at the time. Radio was still regulated by the CRTC's predecessor, the Board of Broadcast Governors. Regulations limiting effective radiated power to 100,000 watts on FM, which came into force that same year, did not apply to stations which had already received approval for a higher power.

CKOI-FM once had the highest power output of any radio station in Canada, and the second highest power in North America, only exceeded by WBCT in Grand Rapids, Michigan, which operates at 320,000 watts. Unlike other North American superpower FM stations that have lowered their wattage over the years, CKOI-FM actively protected its 307,000-watt signal. For instance, when Industry Canada advised the station in 2004 that it was out of compliance with updated Code 6 safety regulations (which deal with acceptable levels of radiation), owner Corus Entertainment invested in emission reduction equipment instead of simply reducing power, which would have restricted output to 122,800 watts.

longtime Corus-era CKOI logo; used until February 2011

=== Oldies and progressive rock ===
The simulcast with CKVL AM ended in 1970, with CKVL-FM launching an automated oldies format. It used the moniker "VL-FM". The station played French-language Top 40 hits of the 1950s and 1960s, including remakes of English-language hits translated into French as well as a few original English-language songs. There were no DJs.

On December 6, 1976, CKVL-FM became CKOI-FM, and the station's format was changed to progressive rock, with a full-time DJ staff. It evolved into a largely new wave-based format in 1979.

=== Top 40 ===
As the CRTC eased up on restrictions against frequent playing of hit songs on FM, CKOI evolved to a rock-leaning contemporary hit radio format in 1980. The fall 1991 Bureau of Broadcast Measurement (BBM) ratings were a defining moment for the station, as it found itself in first place in Montreal with over a million listeners in full coverage. It was the first time that an FM station finished in first place in the fall ratings, which are the most important for the radio industry as they are used to determine prices charged for advertising for the important Christmas season.

CKOI-FM would have over a million listeners in 32 consecutive books (excluding summer ratings starting in 2001, which were only compiled for the central area of the market), from fall 1991 to fall 2002 inclusively. (The station had already managed to get a million listeners on a few occasions during summer ratings before 1991). The station's best-ever results under the old diary system were obtained in the spring 1995 ratings, in which CKOI-FM registered 1,341,300 listeners. By comparison, CKAC 730 AM, which had been Montreal's usual #1 station, had 775,500 listeners.

CKOI-FM and sister station 850 CKVL were sold in 1992, by its founder Jack Tietolman to Metromedia CMR, a company owned by Pierre Arcand and Pierre Béland. Both stations were again sold in 2001, this time to Corus Entertainment.

On January 1, 2002, the station's city of licence became Montreal. Until then, it had officially been Verdun. However, as a result of a municipal merger, the City of Verdun became a borough of Montreal.

The station's studios were moved for the first time in July 2006, after decades at 211 Gordon Avenue in Verdun. The new studios are located at Place Bonaventure in downtown Montreal.

=== Changes in ownership ===
On April 30, 2010, Cogeco announced it would purchase Corus Quebec's radio stations, including CKOI-FM, for $80 million. On December 17, 2010, the CRTC approved the sale of most of Corus's radio stations in Quebec, including CKOI-FM, to Cogeco.

On November 24, 2011, the CRTC determined that CKOI-FM had abusively used musical montages of English-language songs in order to circumvent French-language music quotas, and imposed a condition of licence on the station limiting the broadcasting of montages to 10 percent of the broadcast week.

In 2016, Cogeco applied to the CRTC for permission to move the transmission site to Mount Royal, as space had become available there after the digital TV transition. Moreover, the move would allow Cogeco to co-locate all its Montreal FM stations, and the superior location would allow CKOI to use lower power to achieve the same reception range. The transmitter was moved in late 2018. Effective radiated power is now limited to 148,000 watts, still much higher than the usual maximum. The station's signal can be heard as far north as Mont-Tremblant, as far east as Drummondville, as far west as the eastern suburbs of Ottawa and down to the Canada–United States border.

=== Shortwave relay ===
For a period in the 1990s, CKOI-FM was simulcast over shortwave relay station CFCX on 6095 kHz, which had previously relayed CKOI's then-sister station CINW. In 1999, the transmitter was taken out of service due to its age.

The transmitter was not repaired or replaced, bringing shortwave service to an end. Several other commercial stations in Canada had shortwave transmitters in their history to serve listeners in remote communities in Northern Canada. With improved ways to receive radio signals, those stations have largely gone dark.

== Personalities ==
Throughout the 2000s, the station has been known especially for pranks by the Masked Avengers, a duo composed of Marc-Antoine Audette and Sebastien Trudel. They have pranked internationally known personalities such as Jacques Chirac, Britney Spears, Sarah Palin and George W. Bush. The duo appeared first on a weekend morning show Les Justiciers Masqués, and later on a daily afternoon show Les Cerveaux de l'info, along with co-host Richard Z. Sirois.

Comedian Pierre Brassard, also known for prank phone calls, was also previously associated with the station.

Longtime morning host Normand Brathwaite left CKOI on March 17, 2006, following a conflict with former co-host Jean-René Dufort. Dufort became the station's morning personality, remaining until June 22, 2007. Braithwaite joined rival station 107.3 CITE-FM in August 2011. In September 2023, he returned to CKOI as a contributor on the morning show on Mondays.

One popular weekday feature is Le 6 à 6 ("The Six at Six"), the top six hits that week, broadcast weeknights at 6 pm. From 1995 to 2012, the program was hosted by Denis Fortin.

== Slogans ==
- 1980s-1990s: Le son de Montréal (The sound of Montreal)
- 2000s: Plus de hits, plus de fun (More hits, more fun)
- 2009-2011: La puissance musicale de Montréal (The musical power of Montreal)
- February–August 2011: L'ultime radio (Ultimate radio)
- August 2011-August 2012: La puissance des hits (Hit power)
- August 2012 – 2015: Mes hits. Mon fun. (My hits. My fun).
- 2015–present: Changeons le monde un hit à la fois. (Changing the world one hit at a time).
