= Cogeco =

Canadian telecommunications and media company headquartered in Montreal, Quebec

Cogeco Inc.
- Trade name: CGO Inc.
- Type: Public
- Traded as: TSX: CGO; TSX: CCA
- Industry: Telecommunications
- Founded: 1957; 69 years ago Trois-Rivières, Quebec, Canada
- Founder: Henri Audet
- Headquarters: Montreal, Quebec, Canada
- Key people: Frédéric Perron (president & CEO); Patrice Ouimet (SVP & CFO)
- Products: Cable TV, Internet, telecommunications, broadcasting
- Revenue: ▲CA$2.33 billion (FY19) CA$2.15 billion (FY18)
- Operating income: ▲CA$1.11 billion (FY19) CA$1.01 billion (FY18)
- Net income: ▲CA$432 million (FY19) CA$351 million (FY18)
- Total assets: ▼CA$6.95 billion (FY19) CA$7.18 billion (FY18)
- Number of employees: 4,500 (2019)
- Subsidiaries: Breezeline
- ASN: 7992
- Website: corpo.cogeco.com/cca/ www.cogeco.ca

Cogeco Inc. is a Canadian telecommunications and media company. Its corporate offices are located at 1 Place Ville-Marie in Montreal, Quebec. The company is structured into three strategic business units (SBU); Cogeco Connexion, Breezeline (previously known as Atlantic Broadband), and Cogeco Media. The company provides a range of telecommunication products and services including cable television, radio and television broadcasting, telephony, and Internet services in Ontario and Quebec in Canada, and in thirteen states along the east coast of the United States.

Cogeco Inc. is a publicly traded company (TSX: CGO) and is controlled through multiple voting shares (accounting for 71.29% of votes) by the Audet family's holding company Gestion Audem Inc. In turn, Cogeco Inc. fully owns Cogeco Media, and owns 82.96% of the voting rights in Cogeco Communications Inc., a separate publicly traded company (TSX: CCA) which owns the Canadian and U.S. cable and telecom operations. The name Cogeco is an acronym for Compagnie Générale de Communication ("General Communications Company").

== History ==
In June 1957, Henri Audet (1918-2012) left the Canadian Broadcasting Corporation (CBC), became president and managing director of Télévision St. Maurice Inc., and was awarded a broadcasting license by the Canadian Radio Broadcasting Commission (CRBC) to operate a television station in Trois-Rivières, Quebec. The call sign would be CKTM-TV, and it would become an affiliate of the CBC's French-language network. Télévision St. Maurice Inc. was later renamed Cogéco Radio-Télévision Inc., a subsidiary of Cogeco Inc. He would also become chairman and president of La Belle Vision Inc., which was in 1972, Cogeco's first acquisition. Henri Audet was chairman and CEO of Cogeco Inc. between 1976 and 1993, and later in 1996, was named President Emeritus of Cogeco Inc. and Cogeco Cable Inc.

Over time, the company divested itself of all its on-air broadcast television assets. In 1989, the company obtained its initial presence in Ontario by acquiring cable systems in Burlington and Oakville and in 1996 expanded further in Ontario by acquiring an additional 25 cable systems (303,000 customers for CA$350 million) from Rogers Communications. Between 1998 and 2001, Cogeco increased its footprint in both Quebec and Ontario with the acquisition of an additional 19 cable systems. In a turn of events, in 2009, and again in 2010, Rogers invested substantially in both Cogeco Inc. and Cogeco Cable Inc., resulting in some speculation surrounding the two rivals.

In 2011, the company increased its radio station assets by acquiring Corus Québec, a subsidiary of Corus Entertainment, and in 2018 acquired additional radio stations from RNC Média, giving it a total of twenty-two radio stations in Quebec and one in Ontario. Also that year, the company purchased Métromédia for CA$41 million to later sell it in 2018 to Bell Media for an undisclosed amount.

In February 2012, the company also sold its cable system Cabovisão in Portugal to the European media group Altice.

In July 2012, the company expanded into the U.S. market by acquiring the cable system operator Atlantic Broadband. In December that same year, it acquired Peer 1 Hosting, an internet infrastructure provider, and later in October 2015, merged it with its Cogeco Data Services, forming a new subsidiary called Cogeco Peer 1.

In January 2018, Cogeco Communications Inc. announced that its US subsidiary Atlantic Broadband had completed the acquisition of the cable systems owned by Harron Communications which were operating under the brand name MetroCast for US$1.4 billion, making the company the eight largest hybrid fibre coaxial cable operator in North America.

In February 2019, the company announced it sold Cogeco Peer 1 to private equity firm Digital Colony for CA$720 million. Cogeco Peer 1 later changed its name to Aptum Technologies.

On 2 September 2020, Altice USA announced an unsolicited offer to purchase both Cogeco and Cogeco Communications. Altice announced it would immediately resell Cogeco's Canadian assets to Rogers, which retains large minority interests in both Cogeco companies, while Altice would keep Cogeco's U.S. assets including Atlantic Broadband. Cogeco's controlling shareholders, the Audet family, indicated shortly thereafter that they would not support the offer. It was also rejected by the companies' boards of directors, and Quebec Premier François Legault had also signalled his opposition to losing another major Quebec-based company. Altice and Rogers said they would continue to pursue a purchase, with Rogers promising to maintain a separate management team and regional headquarters for its Quebec operations. In October 2020, Altice made a second offer, increasing it to CA$11.1 billion in cash, which was again rejected by the Audet family. The offer expired that November. Rogers subsequently sold its remaining stakes in the Cogeco companies to the Caisse de dépôt et placement du Québec in December 2023.

Following the acquisition of systems in Ohio in 2021, Atlantic Broadband rebranded as Breezeline in early 2022.

On 21 October 2020, Cogeco Communications announced an agreement for the acquisition of DERYTelecom by its subsidiary Cogeco Connexion for $405 million. Founded in Saguenay, DERYTelecom is the third largest cable company in Quebec. The closing of the transaction is announced on 14 December 2020.

In February 2023, the company announced that it had acquired the telecommunications operation of Internet service provider Oxio.

== Digital services ==
=== Digital cable television ===
Within its Canadian cable operations in Ontario and Quebec, 98% of all homes passed by Cogeco Cable-owned plant are able to access digital cable services.

In August 2018, Cogeco announced that it would convert its cablesystems to IPTV using MediaKind platforms.

=== Internet access ===
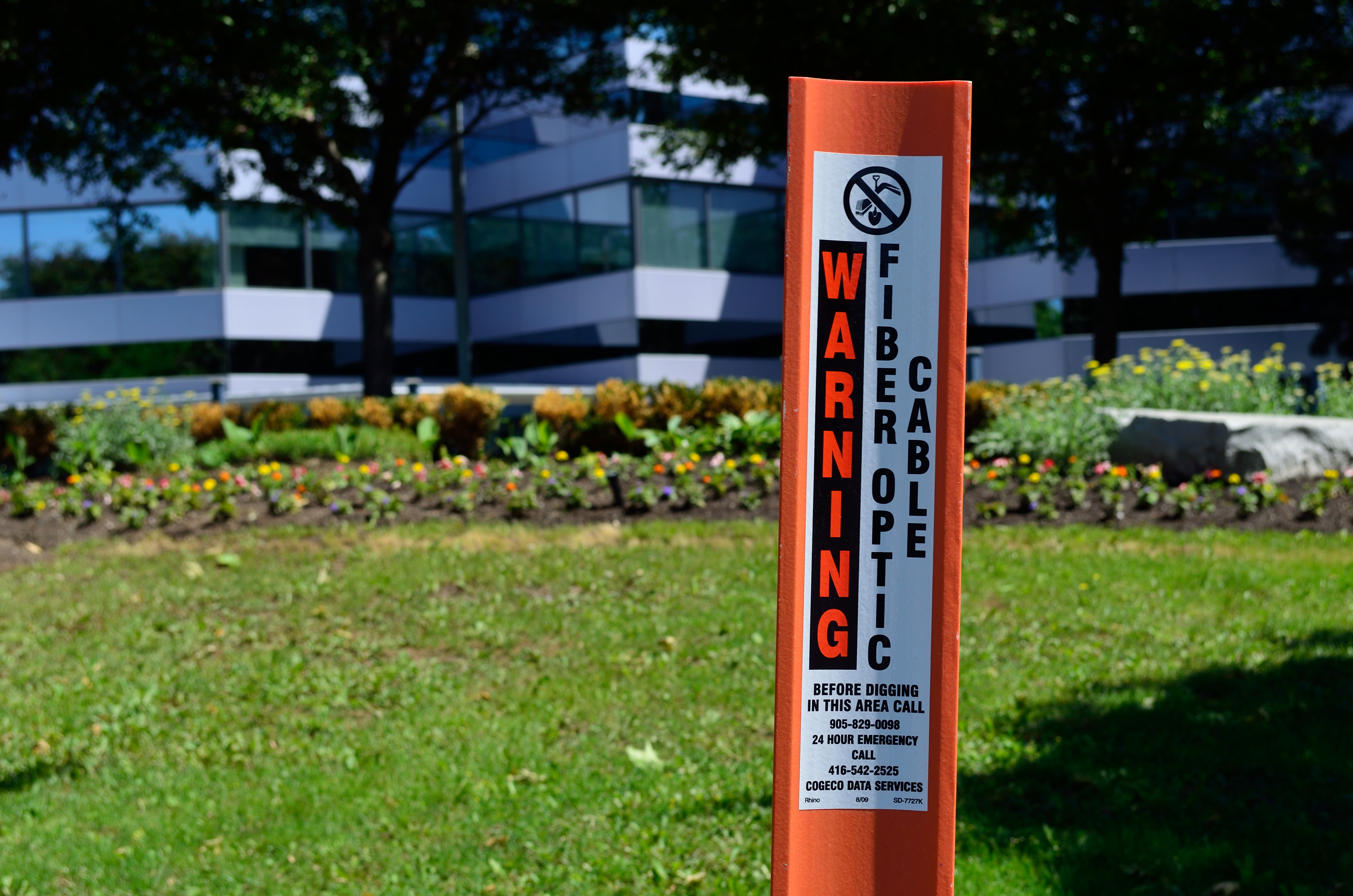
A marker post alerting to the presence of Cogeco optical fibre

Cogeco Cable was one of the first major cable operators to deploy its network compliant with the Data Over Cable Service Interface Specification (DOCSIS) standard to provide all of its Internet Protocol (IP) based services, such as internet access and VoIP as early as 2002.

== See also ==
- YourTV
- Cogeco radio stations
- List of cable television companies
- List of internet service providers in Canada
