= Videon Cablesystems =

Defunct Canadian cable television provider

- Industry: cable television, hi-speed Internet
- Founded: 1962
- Defunct: 2001
- Fate: Merged
- Successor: Rogers Communications
- Headquarters: Winnipeg, Manitoba, Canada
- Products: Fibrelink
- Parent: Famous Players, Moffat Communications

Videon Cablesystems (also Videon Cable-TV or Metro Videon Community Antenna Television Inc.) was a Canadian cable television service in Manitoba, Alberta, and for a short period, northwest Ontario. The company was owned by Moffat Communications Ltd. and Randall L. Moffat was its president.

Winnipeg Videon Inc. served Winnipeg on the west side of the Red River from August 14, 1968, until 2002.

In 2001, the Moffat family sold Videon Cable-TV Inc. to Shaw Cable of Calgary, Alberta. Shaw itself was acquired by Rogers Communications in 2023.

== History ==
The origins of Videon date back to October 1959, when original General Manager Claude Boucher applied to the Lakehead Public Utilities Board in Port Arthur, Ontario (now Thunder Bay) to provide cable television service to the town through the new company Lakehead Videon.

Metro Videon Community Antenna Television Inc. was formed "quietly" in 1962, after three additional television signals—CBWFT, KCND, and CJAY, started broadcasting in 1960.

The initial partners were Randy Moffat, owner of CKY (radio); Ralph Misener, owner of CJAY Channel 7 television; Famous Players theatres, owner of several cable TV systems including the one at Thunder Bay, Ontario; and Claude Boucher, Videon's first general manager. They expanded service to Pinawa, Manitoba before approaching the federal Department of Transport for a license to operate in Winnipeg.

Metro Videon had waited to apply for a cable-TV license because the Department had "frozen" new applications for community antenna (CATV) companies to serve towns and cities so they could draw up regulations for this type of service. But yet at the same time, the company was so confident that everything would work out, that prior to the announcement of the service, they pre-purchased and installed large amounts of coaxial cable underground in parts of Tuxedo, Fort Garry, and Assiniboia. They paid a rental rate of 60 cents per 100 feet of coax. to Manitoba Telephone System (MTS). This saved Videon money because MTS was placing their telephone cables underground at the same time.

Preliminary negotiations with MTS for use of telephone poles and underground right-of-way to string coaxial cable through the western half of metropolitan Winnipeg went from 1963 to 1967. Later in the year, Videon had started to construct the headend and cable TV infrastructure. Videon had hoped to include the suburbs east of the Red River, but this fell to another company, Greater Winnipeg Cablevision. The new cable company announced that they would charge $10 to connect to their service, and $5 per month to subscribe to the signals. This low fee remained much in effect until the advent of Canadian pay television in 1983.

The cable system was built and was sold to Maclean-Hunter in July 1970. This was done because the Canadian Radio-television and Telecommunications Commission (CRTC) had complained that Famous Players had 50% ownership of Lakehead Videon and Metro Videon, which in turn was primarily American owned. CRTC rules stated that Canadian cable companies must be at least 80% Canadian-owned.

Videon's first administrative offices were located at 2 Donald Street South, but moved to 651 Stafford St. around January 1976.

For a short while in 1976, Videon carried the audio of CJOB-FM on cable 6, CBW-FM on cable 7, CKY-FM on cable 9. The CRTC did not allow this and Videon had to discontinue the service in early April 1976. A month later Videon had to pull a special closed-circuit program signal between Health Sciences Centre and the St. Boniface Hospital because the CRTC did not allow "point-to-point undertakings."

In 1978 Videon applied to the CRTC for a 50 cent fee increase, the first since the cable company began operations in Winnipeg.

After the major rebuild of 1987, Videon added the Assiniboia Downs Racing Network on January 23, 1988. This made possible for the first time so-called "off track" betting.

In the 1990s, Videon bought up several locally owned cable companies, creating Canada's fifth largest cable company. They had expanded their reach to include Headingley. They also purchased cable companies in northwest Ontario and Alberta (Edmonton and 24 other communities).

In 2001 the Moffat family sold Videon Cable-TV Inc. to SHAW Cable of Calgary, Alberta.

== Coverage area ==
Videon served Winnipeg proper, Assiniboia, St. James, Brooklands, West Kildonan, Old Kildonan, Fort Garry, Charleswood, and Tuxedo. Videon also served West and North Edmonton, Alberta.

The first area to receive cable-TV was St. Norbert in August 1968.

The headend and administrative offices were located in a former A&P supermarket building at 651 Stafford St. until 1995 when Videon moved to a suburban location at 22 Scurfield Blvd. in Fort Garry. The headend and administrative offices for Edmonton were located in the current West Edmonton Shaw Cable building at 10450-178 St.

== Programming ==
=== Distant signals ===
From August 14, 1968, until March 1986 Videon carried two Fargo, North Dakota stations, KTHI-TV 11 (ABC then NBC), and KXJB-TV 4 (CBS). The distance to the headend was long and Videon applied to the CRTC for a microwave link, which was approved on July 5, 1974, and installed at Tolstoi, Manitoba to pick up these two stations directly from Fargo. However, during very hot and humid summer weather, the signal quality would degrade to the point of being unwatchable. Later on Videon received KXJB via a translator at Glasston, North Dakota (K58BP).

On July 9, 1975, Videon added the signal of KGFE (PBS) Grand Forks. Initially Videon tested the channel on 3 and 7 to find out which had the least interference from local over the air channels (CBWFT and CKY-TV respectively). They later went with cable 3.

After several years of complaints of poor signal quality, Videon applied to the CRTC to replace its NBC and CBS affiliates with those of WDIV 4 and WJBK 2, both from Detroit, Michigan via Anik satellite, and in March, 1986 the Fargo stations were replaced with those from Detroit. However, by 1993, complaints over the level of crime reporting on the commercial Detroit stations lead Videon to not renew its agreement to carry WDIV and WJBK, and instead replaced them with other stations, first from Toledo, Ohio, and later from Minneapolis, Minnesota.

=== Community programming ===
Between August, 1968 and 1976, Videon used to have a simple B&W camera housed on a track go back and forth to display the weather on analog dials. At the end of one way was a small poster for advertising. This was cablecast on channel 13 until 1976 when Videon went to an all electronic text system which is still used today.

The Broadcasting Act, passed by Parliament in 1968, made CATV systems an integral part of the broadcasting system and established the Canadian Radio Television Commission to regulate and supervise all aspects on the Broadcasting system, with a view to implementing the broadcasting policy enunciated in the act.

The commission recognized the need for a medium of local expression and took positive steps to fill this need. The CRTC summarized its policy as follows:

Cable television, which began as a service to remote communities with reception difficulty, has now become a major factor in the Canadian Broadcasting System, and has a potential for a wide range of services in all communities. These community programming services can be of a complementary, rather than a competitive nature to those already provided by other broadcasting services.

The CRTC mandated that cable companies across Canada provide a channel for the use of the community. They had the revolutionary idea that Canadian airwaves belong to the Canadian people. The cable companies were expected to spend ten per cent of their income on a Community Channel.

At that time, the CRTC had policies for the operation of the Community Channel, but no regulations. They wanted people across the country to experiment with various ideas before regulations were put into place.

In September 1972, Winnipeg Videon Inc. hired a program manager to search the community for individuals and groups who would be interested in, or benefit from, programming on the channel.

Videon provided two community channels: 1. Public Access - Programs produced by the public, using Videon's facilities and staff. Individuals were trained in the use of the equipment. 2. Informational Programming - National Film Board material and tapes and film provided locally. When mobile facilities became available later, Videon took suggestions from the community as to what event to cover, but reserved to make the choice.

VPW began on channel 9 and moved to channel 13 in September 1975 when CKND went on the air, then channel 11 after CHMI moved to channel 8 from 13. Videon had a program sharing agreement with Greater Winnipeg Cablevision to retransmit programming on each other's community channel.

Videon wanted to cablecast the monthly Community Committee meetings, and they appeared at the Fort Rouge meeting in April, 1977 to request that their recording equipment be allowed. The first cablecast meeting took place at the VPW studio at 657 Stafford St. on June 21, although later meetings were held at the regular Community Committee rooms. A newspaper article at the time quotes politician June Westbury saying "I support the idea because the more coverage we have, the more community involvement we can hope for."

Videon carried coverage of the CBC licence renewal hearings in October 1978 on VPW13, which were one of the first CRTC hearings carried via cable television in Canada.

From 1996 till 2001 Videon produced a weekly public affairs phone-in program, Insight, mainly hosted by Kelly Parker. It featured topics, such as downtown revitalization, urban crime, and other local issues. One of its most noted episodes was the WREB Mayoral Forum of October 1998, held at the Walker Theatre in downtown Winnipeg. However this program was cancelled when SHAW purchased Videon in 2001.

For a time in the 1980s they used a song from The Alan Parsons Project, "Where's the Walrus", while a narrator, Richard Hersley, told of the community programming services offered by Videon Cable-TV in Winnipeg. Prior to that the title theme from the movie Benji was used as background music to the VPW13 daily open.

In the early 1990s Videon lost its corporate commitment to community programming and with the permission of the CRTC, cut its programming staff in half. The layoffs were a sad "how not to do a mass layoff" chapter in the history of the company. As the staff were informed off-site, the locks on the doors were changed and the remaining staff were not allowed into the building until "job re-entrance interviews" were conducted. Most jobs were changed and neither the staff nor the programming was ever the same. What once was a leader in community programming, became another victim of corporate greed.

Early in 1979, the CRTC allowed Canadian companies to purchase TVRO equipment and use it to receive and then transmit Canadian broadcasts. In September 1979 Winnipeg was the first city in Canada to receive the House of Commons via the Anik-B satellite and cablecast on VSP-7.

On October 30, 1982, Videon transferred some of its programming from VPW-13 such as city hall, community committee meetings and created a secondary community access channel, VSP-7.

Later in the decade it carried Manitoba Educational Television, Genesis Storytime.

In 1982 there was a consumer info show and another segment on law, produced by the Public Legal Education Association.

And in 1983 a program called Health and Wellness aired Wednesday nights at 7 p.m. and replayed Sundays at 6:30 p.m.

When VSP-7 wasn't cablecasting video programming, it would function as the Community Billboard channel.

=== Live coverage events ===
City Council, Community Committees, Manitoba Legislature Question Period, House of Commons Proceedings, Canada Day celebrations.

Until 1991 Videon replayed City Council meetings on Saturday mornings. However, for some unknown reason they stopped doing this after signing a multi-year contract with the City Hall Clerk's Department.

Also, until the early 1990s Videon carried Live coverage of Community Committee meetings. These are no longer carried.

=== Tiering ===
By 1989 the CRTC allowed MuchMusic and TSN to be part of basic cable rather than pay television stations. So Videon created a tier of services beginning in July 1989 called the Variety Pak. It was sold for $5.95/month and included TSN, CNN, WTVS 56 Detroit, A&E, TNN, TV5, and MuchMusic. This package was to become known as Tier 1.

On January 1, 1995, several new Canadian satellite-cable (also called specialty) networks started broadcasting. These were Bravo!, Discovery Channel Canada, NCN, Life Network, and WTN. Réseau de l'information (RDI) was part of basic cable. This was Tier 2. And by this time, people in other cities such as Toronto and Vancouver were starting to get annoyed at the high cost of cable-TV, threatening to disconnect their cable service and get a grey-market DirecTv satellite service instead.

Tier 3 was implemented in stages between September 1997 and October 1998, beginning with CTV News1, MuchMoreMusic, ROBtv, Star!, and TalkTv.

=== Pay television ===
In 1983 Videon had two channels left for pay-TV. It used just one of them, choosing to offer the national First Choice service on channel 22. Videon claimed at the time that they might be able to make channel 23 (J) available for another pay-TV service, having to choose between C-Channel or Superchannel. But they did not follow through on this, possibly because of co-channel interference.

A long-time dispute between Videon Cable-TV and MTS over ownership of the wiring and poles used to carry the signal caused Videon to get far behind other cablecos. in offering an expanded channel lineup. Both parties were very stubborn for several years, hindering the growth of cable TV service in Winnipeg.

However, it wasn't until a full cable rebuild in the summer of 1987 that Videon was able to offer the other pay television services.

Videon used the Zenith Z-Tac cable scrambling system to keep its pay-TV signals from theft. This was an advanced addressable system where each descrambler has an ID, similar to an IP address on a computer today.

Beginning June 28, 1991, Videon added three U.S. Superstations to its pay-TV lineup: WTBS Atlanta (cable 33), WGN Chicago (cable 34), and WSBK Boston (cable 35).

== Internet service ==
In the mid-1990s when Internet access from home became affordable, Videon had helped to create a high-speed cable modem service called Wave. Then in March 1999 Videon switched to the @Home Network.

For business users, Videon had FiberLink, a SONET-based voice, data communications line, which has the ability to interconnect LANs and PBXs.

== See also ==
- Shaw TV Winnipeg - a community cable channel that previously named VPW and VSP

== CRTC licence-related links ==
- CRTC Decision 1986-183 - Permission to replace Fargo ND stations with Detroit MI
- CRTC Decision 1991-043 - 1991-1996 License Renewal
- CRTC Decision 1992-369 - Denial of application for MMDS service
- CRTC Decision 1996-694 - 1996-2003 License Renewal
- CRTC Decision 1996-683 - 1996 License Renewal for St. Eustache & Elie system
- CRTC Decision 1997-172 - Fee Increase Disallowed
- CRTC Decision 2001-186 - Assets sold to SHAW
