= CKY =

CKY may refer to:

- CKY (band), American rock band, formerly "Camp Kill Yourself"
  - CKY (video series), named after the band
  - CKY crew, people involved in the video series and related projects
- CKY-DT, a television station in Winnipeg, Manitoba, Canada
- CKY-FM, an FM radio station in Winnipeg, Canada
- CKY-FM, former callsign of CITI-FM radio station, Winnipeg, Canada
- CKY, former radio station, Winnipeg, Canada, later CBW (AM)
- CYK algorithm or Cocke–Younger–Kasami algorithm, usually CYK but sometimes CKY
- Conakry International Airport, IATA code
- Po Leung Kuk Choi Kai Yau School a private school in Hong Kong
