= List of television stations in Manitoba =

This is a list of broadcast television stations serving cities in the Canadian province of Manitoba . In 2011, some of these stations switched to digital broadcast television.

City of licence	Analog channel	Digital channel	Virtual channel	Callsign	Network	Notes
Brandon	4			CKYB-TV	CTV	satellite of CKY-DT Winnipeg
Dauphin	12			CKYD-TV	CTV	satellite of CKY-DT Winnipeg
Fisher Branch	8			CKYA-TV	CTV	satellite of CKY-DT Winnipeg
Flin Flon	13			CKYF-TV	CTV	satellite of CKY-DT Winnipeg
McCreary	13			CKYB-TV	CTV	satellite of CKY-DT Winnipeg
Minnedosa	2			CKND-TV-2	Global	
The Pas	12			CKYP-TV	CTV	satellite of CKY-DT Winnipeg
Portage la Prairie		13	13.1	CHMI-DT	Citytv	
Thompson	9			CKYT-TV	CTV	satellite of CKY-DT Winnipeg
Winnipeg		32	3.1	CBWFT-DT	R-C	
Winnipeg	6	27	6.1	CBWT-DT	CBC	
Winnipeg	7	7	7.1	CKY-DT	CTV	
Winnipeg	9	19	9.1	CKND-DT	Global	
Winnipeg	13	13	13.1	CHMI-DT	Citytv	MTS TV HD ch. 417 SHAW ch. 8 Bell ch. 228
Winnipeg		14	14.1	CFUM-DT	Multicultural, multilingual stations (U Multicultural channel)	
Winnipeg		35	35.1	CIIT-DT	Religious independent	

== Defunct stations ==
- Channel 5: CKX-TV - CBC - Brandon

== See also ==
- List of television stations in Canada
- Media in Canada
