= Sarnia Collegiate Institute and Technical School =

Location
- 275 Wellington Street; Sarnia, Lambton County, Ontario, N7T 1H1; 42.9679°N 82.4014°W

Information
- School type: Secondary School
- Opened: October 27, 1922
- School board: Lambton Kent District School Board
- Area trustee: Dave Douglas, Jack Fletcher, Elizabeth Hudie, Lareina Rising (First Nation), Cole Anderson (Student)
- Principal: Mr. Sean Keane
- Teaching staff: 38
- Employees: 90
- Grades: 9-12
- Enrolment: 564.5
  - Grade 9: 148
  - Grade 10: 113
  - Grade 11: 118
  - Grade 12: 183
- Colours: Blue and White
- Song: The SCITS Song
- Team name: Blue Bombers
- Yearbook: The Collegiate
- Website: http://scits.lkdsb.net/

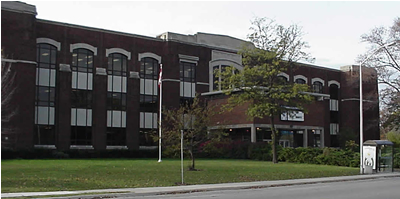

SCITS or Sarnia Collegiate Institute & Technical School was a public secondary school (high school) located in Sarnia, Ontario, managed by the Lambton Kent District School Board. It had approximately 550 full-time students in 2015–2016. Their teams were called the Blue Bombers, and in November 2015 the school was designated for closure in 2017.

== Facility ==
SCITS was the only secondary school in Lambton County to enjoy the use of an 850-seat auditorium. The auditorium was home to the SCITS drama classes and B.E.S.T. Productions. The dedication to the Drama program was evident in the 14 different performances by the SCITS students. The SCITS Revue was a tradition that went back as far as the school building itself in 1922. The annual variety show featured singing, dancing, comedy, etc., and was open to all students in the school. In 2013, Canadian Astronaut Chris Hadfield, gave a motivational talk on his time aboard the International Space Station in a sold out SCITS Auditorium.

SCITS was home to one of the only heated indoor pools in the county. A swimming component was inherent in the physical education curriculum at SCITS.

The school library housed several hundred books, a computer assisted study area, as well as a rare collection of aboriginal artifacts and art work.

== History ==
As the oldest secondary school in the city, Sarnia Collegiate Institute & Technical School (SCITS) was steeped in history. SCITS was part of Sarnia's 100th anniversary as a city in 2014.

The first edition of the annual SCITS yearbook, "The Collegiate," was published at Christmas in 1914, and a yearbook was published annually until the school was closed in 2016. 1914 was the same year that Sarnia incorporated as a city.

Sarnia Collegiate traced its roots back to the 1800s as a small grammar school, then as a school on Lochiel Street, later as a school on London Road, and finally in 1922 as Sarnia Collegiate Institute & Technical School on Wellington Street. The school operated as "SCITS" until July, 2016, when low student population led to consolidation of SCITS with St. Clair Secondary School (SCSS), forming the Great Lakes Secondary School, which held classes in the SCITS building for the school year 2017–2018, while renovations and updates were made at the SCSS building on Murphy Road.

In 1920 the Sarnia Board of Education made the decision to form a new high school to replace the one on London Road, following which debentures were offered. With the Adolescent Act coming into effect in September 1922, making it compulsory for boys and girls up to 16 & 18 years of age to attend school, it became even more imperative to provide more classrooms as soon as possible.

In 1921 S. B. Coon and Son, Architects from Toronto submitted the plans for the new building. Tenders were called in February 1921. The general contractor was P. H. Secord and Sons Construction Company of Brantford. There were about 40 sub-contractors among whom were Sarnia firms including Sarnia Bridge Company, roof trusses; F. Chambers and Company, electricians; Flisinger, plumbing and steamfitting; Mueller Brass, and a great number of others.

Headlines in the December 31, 1921, issue of the Sarnia Canadian Observer read “NEW COLLEGIATE IS THE BEST EQUIPPED IN THE PROVINCE”. Heating was thermostatically controlled, air was constantly exchanged, and it had an independent fire alarm system, automatic clocks controlled from the principal's office, a medical room, the 25-foot by 75-foot’ swimming pool with showers and dressing room, and a number of other specialty rooms.

On August 5, 1921, a cornerstone was laid by Dr. F. W. Merchant of the Ontario Department of Education. Included in that cornerstone was a copper box containing a 1921 city directory which listed the area, population and many other facts about Sarnia, sample bottles of oil from Imperial Oil Ltd., and a manuscript by Chief Jacobs written in Ojibwa with an English translation, all the current copper and silver coins, a list of the civic officials, and a history of the schools dating back to 1838. Included as well was a list of the present board of education members. Present at that ceremony were the mayor, city council members, board of education members, and many members of Sarnia's clergy, including Dr. John Hall and Rev. Canon Davis. Also present were a great many of Sarnia's prominent citizens.

In September 1922, classes commenced at the new school, although its official opening wasn't until October of that year. The ceremonies on October 28, 1922, were attended by the students, officials, teachers and the general public, filling the auditorium. The newspaper headlines on that day read “GREATEST EVENT IN THE HISTORY OF SARNIA WITH THE OPENING OF COLLEGIATE-TECHNICAL SCHOOL”.

For over thirty years, this was the only public high school in Sarnia. When it was built, it was one of the very few high schools in Ontario that was free to its students.

== Controversy ==
In November 2015, Lambton Kent District School Board staff presented a report to the board in regards to the consolidation of St. Clair Secondary School, and Sarnia Collegiate institute & Technical School. This report called for the consolidation of both schools at the now St. Clair Secondary School sites, and closing SCITS.

There was public outcry regarding this proposal and a group has formed to oppose the closure, including an organized "Save SCITS" group. The group emphasized the community importance and heritage conservation value of keeping the nearly-century old building.

On May 10, 2016, despite vocal public admonition to consolidate the two schools at the historic 1922 Sarnia Collegiate site at 275 Wellington Street, Lambton Kent District School Board trustees voted to consolidate the two schools at the 1961 St. Clair Secondary School site at 240 Murphy Road. The Lambton Kent District School Board officially declared the historic building surplus in August 2019, and is listed for sale.

== Notable alumni ==
- Ralph Mackenzie Barford - Distinguished Businessman, Order of Canada
- John Robert Boyle - Alberta Leader of the Opposition, Member of the Legislative Assembly of Alberta, Alberta Cabinet Minister, Alberta Supreme Court Judge
- John E. Brownlee - fifth Premier of Alberta
- Dr. Roger Moore Butler (class of 1944) - Canadian Petroleum Hall of Fame, Invented "Steam Assisted Gravity Drainage" (Patent# 4244485)
- James Doohan - actor (Star Trek)
- Marian Engel (née Marian Ruth Passmore) - Award-Winning Novelist, Order of Canada
- Kerry Fraser - National Hockey League Referee
- Roger John Gallaway - Member of Canadian Parliament, former mayor of Sarnia
- Mike Gardiner - Major League Baseball player
- Douglas George - Consul General of Canada in Detroit
- William Goodison - Member of the Parliament of Canada
- Ross Gray - Member of the Parliament of Canada
- William John Hanna - Provincial Secretary and Registrar of Ontario, Legislative Assembly of Ontario
- Robert Edward Hurlock - Canadian Football League player, Sarnia Lambton Sports Hall of Fame
- Dustin Jeffrey - National Hockey League player
- Patrick Kerwin - Chief Justice of Canada
- Roberta MacAdams - the first woman, together with Louise McKinney, to be elected to the Legislative Assembly of Alberta (and any legislature in Canada and in the British Empire); the first woman in the British empire to introduce a piece of legislation for debate.
- John Manore - Grey Cup Champion (Sarnia Imperials, 1934 All Stars)
- Gary McCracken - Drummer of the band "Max Webster"
- Brent McFarlane - Canadian Olympic Coach, author
- Pauline Mills McGibbon - Lieutenant Governor of Ontario, Order of Canada, Order of Ontario
- Tony McKegney - National Hockey League player
- Ralph Misener - businessman and President of the Winnipeg Blue Bombers
- Maurice O'Loughlin - Senior Vice President and Director of Exxon Corporation in New York
- Tony (Parsonage) Parsons - journalist and news anchor
- Rob Thomson - Major League Baseball coach
- Paul Ysebaert - National Hockey League player

== See also ==
- List of high schools in Ontario
- Lambton Kent District School Board
- The SCITS Yearbook Project
- Le Seuer, R. E. "Sarnia Schools and Their Development." Hodgins, J. George. The Establishment of Schools and Colleges in Ontario, 1792-1910. Toronto: L. K. Cameron, 1910. 304–306.
- Crich, Lawrence A. "The Red Brick Schoolhouse and Early Schools." 1986. Sarnia Historical Society. August 13, 2015. <http://www.sarniahistoricalsociety.com/story/the-red-brick-schoolhouse-and-early-schools/>.
