= Moffat Communications =

Defunct Canadian broadcasting and cable company

Moffat Communications was a Canadian cable and broadcasting company. Privately owned by the Moffat family, the company was based in Winnipeg, Manitoba. It first went public on the stock market in 1972.

In an interview with the Free Press reporter Paul Sullivan in November 1978, Moffat CEO Ronald Moffat predicted that Canada would introduce DBS services by 1983 and will beam superstations across the country.

They had 60% interest in Consumer Behavior Centre Inc. of Dallas, Texas, an advertising research subsidiary.

== Assets ==
The company owned the following media businesses in Canada and the United States:

=== Media ===
- Videon Cable-TV
- CKY-TV
- CKY
- CITI-FM
- WTN
- Florida Satellite Network
- Kingwood Cable and Lakewood Cable
- CKXL
- CHED (AM)
- CHAB (AM)
- CKLG
- CFOX-FM
- CKNG-FM
- CHFM-FM
- CHAM

==== Other ====
- Consumer Behavior Centre Inc.
- Winnipeg Jets
- CKBI (once owned by Lloyd Moffat)

In the 1990s Moffat Communications divested itself of the Winnipeg Jets and in 1996, the NHL franchise relocated to Phoenix, Arizona, United States. Radio stations CHFM, CKY and CITI were sold to Rogers Communications, and Half of CHED and CKNG to CFCN Communications Limited and later in 1992 to Westcom Radio Group. Also that year, radio stations CHAM, CHAB and CFXX (formerly CKXL Calgary) were sold to Golden West Broadcasting, and CKLG and CFOX to Shaw Cablesystems. In 2001 the company was sold to Shaw Communications which already owned CKLG and CFOX-FM Through Corus Radio Company. Later, it was sold to Corus Entertainment, which resold CKY-TV to Bell Globemedia, and WTN to Corus Entertainment.
