= Clear FM =

Clear FM may refer to:

- CKKS-FM, the station formerly branded as 104.9 Clear FM, in Vancouver, British Columbia
- CKY-FM, branded as 102.3 Clear FM, in Winnipeg, Manitoba
