= Cool TV (disambiguation) =

The name Cool TV may represent:

- Cool TV, a television channel in Hungary and Romania
- CoolTV, a defunct cable specialty channel in Canada
- TheCoolTV, a television network in the United States
