= CHMI =

CHMI may refer to:

- CHMI-DT, a city owned-and-operated television station serving Winnipeg, Manitoba, Canada
- Czech Hydrometeorological Institute, within the Environmental Ministry of the Czech Republic
