= Paul Morton (television executive) =

Canadian entertainment executive (1938–2024)

Paul Gustav Morton (May 29, 1938 – January 17, 2024) was a Canadian entertainment executive who served as the president of Odeon–Morton Theatres, Canwest, and Global Television Network.

== Early life ==
Morton was born on May 29, 1938, to Henry A. and Eva Rebecca (Ginsberg) Morton. His father was president of the Odeon–Morton Theatres Company. Morton was born and raised in Winnipeg and earned his Bachelor of Arts and Bachelor of Laws from the University of Manitoba.

== Career ==
After graduating, Morton became president of Odeon–Morton Theatres. From 1974 to 1975, he was president of the Winnipeg Blue Bombers of the Canadian Football League. At 35 years old, Morton was the youngest president in team history.

Morton invested in and served as president of Canwest, a company formed by Izzy Asper to operate an independent television station in Winnipeg. In 1975, Canwest agreed to purchase the assets of KCND-TV, a U.S. television station that targeted the Winnipeg market, if it received a licence from the Canadian Radio-television and Telecommunications Commission. The acquisition gave Canwest the equipment and staff it needed to launch a station and eliminated a competitor. Canwest beat out Craig Broadcasting for Winnipeg's new television licence and on August 31, 1975, the company launched CKND-TV.

In 1974, Morton, Asper, and Seymour Epstein formed Global Ventures Western Ltd. to aid Allan Slaight's IWC Communications in its purchase of Global Television Network, a regional television station serving Southern Ontario. In 1977, Global Ventures Western Ltd. purchased IWC's shares in Global and Morton became president of the network. In 1979, Global acquired the Toronto Metros-Croatia of the North American Soccer League, which the company renamed the Toronto Blizzard. In 1980, Morton sold Odeon–Morton Theatres to Canadian Odeon Theatres to focus on Global. In 1986, Morton and Epstein sued Asper, alleging he had reneged on a deal to sell them control of Global Ventures Western Ltd. The lawsuit was dismissed in 1989, but the court ordered that the company's shares be auctioned off. Asper outbid Morton and Epstein to acquire the network.

Morton died on January 17, 2024.
