= Tilbury District High School =

Location
- 97 Queen Street; Tilbury, Ontario, N0P 2L0; Canada; 42.2523°N 82.4332°W

Information
- School type: Secondary School
- Founded: 1954
- School board: Lambton Kent District School Board
- Administrator: Pamela Breault
- Principal: Ben Lawton
- Grades: 9 through 12
- Enrollment: 420 (2019/2020)
- Language: English, French
- Colours: Gold and black
- Team name: Titans
- Website: tdhs.lkdsb.net

Tilbury District High School is a high school located in Tilbury, Ontario. It is part of the Lambton Kent District School Board.

== History ==
The school was built in the 1940s. It was expanded in stages throughout the 1960s.

A reduced speed limit zone near the school was proposed in 2020.

The school has had several cases of COVID-19 during the COVID-19 pandemic in Canada. If a provincial moratorium on rural school closures is removed, Tilbury District High School and other schools in the area may close.

== See also ==
- Education in Ontario
- List of secondary schools in Ontario
