= Great Lakes Secondary School =

Coordinates: 42.96674°N 82.36603°W

Location
- 340 Murphy Road; Sarnia, Lambton County, Ontario; Canada

Information
- School type: Secondary School
- Status: Functioning
- School board: Lambton Kent District School Board (LKDSB)
- Principal: Nathan Jeffrey
- Staff: 95
- Grades: 9-12, Optional 13th Grade
- Age range: 13-19
- Enrolment: Approximately 1000 students
- Language: English, French, and Ojibwe
- Colours: light blue, silver, black
- Athletics: Basketball, Baseball, Badminton, Golf, Tennis, Rugby, Soccer, Cross Country, Track and Field, Volleyball, Football
- Nickname: GLSS
- Team name: Great Lakes Wolfpack
- Communities served: Sarnia, Point Edward, Corunna
- Feeder schools: Lansdowne, Confederation Central, High Park, Colonel Cameron, P.E. McGibbon, London Road, Sir John Moore
- Website: www.lkdsb.net/o/glss

Great Lakes Secondary School (GLSS) is a high school in Sarnia, Ontario. It was previously named St. Clair Secondary School, and it was renamed after being consolidated with Sarnia Collegiate Institute and Technical School. It is managed by the Lambton Kent District School Board.

== Sports ==
Great Lakes Secondary School has teams that are competitive at the board, regional, provincial, and national level. Teams include:^{(1)}

- Badminton
- Baseball
- Basketball (Girls AA OFSAA Silver 2009,2010)
- Cross Country Running
- Football(2015 OFSAA 8-man Champs)
- Golf
- Hockey
- Reach For The Top (Trivia)
- Rugby (Girls AA OFSAA Bronze 2010)
- Soccer
- Swimming
- Tennis
- Track and Field
- Volleyball
- Wrestling

== Notable graduates ==
- Kim Mitchell, Canadian rock artist
- Mike Weir, professional golfer

== See also ==
- Education in Ontario
- List of secondary schools in Ontario
