= Ralph Misener =

Canadian businessperson (1908–1997)

Ralph Scott Misener (September 5, 1908 – February 16, 1997) was a Canadian business executive who was the president of Scott Misener Steamships and the Winnipeg Blue Bombers and a founder of Winnipeg's first privately owned television station, CJAY-TV.

== Biography ==
Misener was born in Sarnia on September 5, 1908. His parents were Robert Scott and Olive Elizabeth (Glass) Misener. He attended the Sarnia Collegiate Institute and Technical School and the University of Western Ontario and was a member of the football team at both schools. In 1934, Misener moved to Winnipeg to work for his family's shipping business – Consolidated Shipping. During World War II, he began working for another family company – Scott Misener Steamships.

Misener was president of the Winnipeg Blue Bombers from 1950 to 1951 and again from 1954 to 1955. He was a founder of the Winnipeg Enterprises Corporation, a non-profit which constructed, owned, and operated Winnipeg Stadium and Winnipeg Arena. From 1958 to 1962, he served as the organization's president. In 1956, Misener helped lead an unsuccessful effort to get Sarnia a franchise in the Interprovincial Rugby Football Union.

In 1960, the Board of Broadcast Governors granted the licences for Canada's first privately owned and Misener was awarded the licence for Winnipeg. CJAY-TV launched on November 12, 1960. In 1961, he was elected president of the Independent Television Organization, a liaison body for the county's eight independent television stations. In 1973, one of Misener's partners, Moffat Communications, acquired full control of the station.

He became the president of Scott Misener Steamships following his father's death in 1963. In 1968, the company launched the M. V. Ralph Misener, the world's largest lake freighter. That same year, he moved to St. Catharines. His son, Scott A. Misener, took over as president in 1978, but Misener remained involved with the business, which was renamed Misener Transportation in 1978, through the 1980s. It was sold in 1994.

Misener also served as a director of Trans-Canada Air Lines and Saint Boniface Hospital and president of the Canadian National Institute for the Blind and the Dominion Marine Association. In 1980, he chaired the Seaway Task Force, a committee formed by the government of Ontario to recommend changes to marine transportation policy. From 1980 to 1985, he was chancellor of Brock University.

Misener died on February 16, 1997, at his home in St. Catharines.
