= CFPG-FM =

Radio station in Winnipeg, Manitoba, Canada

Coordinates: 49°45′20″N 97°07′53″W

- Winnipeg, Manitoba; Canada
- Broadcast area: Winnipeg Metropolitan Region
- Frequency: 99.1 MHz
- Branding: Country 99

Programming
- Format: Country

Ownership
- Owner: Corus Entertainment; (Corus Premium Television Ltd.)
- Sister stations: CJOB, CJKR-FM, CKND-DT

History
- First air date: February 28, 2003
- Former call signs: CJZZ-FM (2003–2007); CJGV-FM (2007–2017)
- Call sign meaning: "Winnipeg" or "Peggy" (former branding)

Technical information
- Licensing authority: CRTC
- Class: C
- ERP: 63,700 watts average 100,000 watts peak
- HAAT: 206.1 metres (676 ft)

Links
- Webcast: Listen live
- Website: country99.com

CFPG-FM (99.1 MHz, Country 99) is a commercial radio station in Winnipeg, Manitoba. Owned by Corus Entertainment, it broadcasts a country format branded as "Country 99". Its transmitter is off St. Mary's Road in Duff Roblin Provincial Park, while its studios located at 201 Portage in Downtown Winnipeg.

== History ==
=== CJZZ ===
The station signed on the air on February 28, 2003. Its call sign was CJZZ-FM, and it was owned by Canwest Communications. The frequency was the former home in Winnipeg of all-news radio network CKO for a short period in 1988 and 1989.

CJZZ-FM aired a smooth jazz format from the Starbuck Communications Tower. But Canwest found this caused multipath interference to occur, so the company applied to the CRTC to broadcast from a new transmitter that Rogers Communications was constructing and to decrease the ERP from 100,000 to 63,700 watts. At this time the station was branded as 99.1 Cool FM, a tie-in for co-owned cable TV station CoolTV.

=== CJGV ===
In September 2006, Corus Entertainment, already owner of Winnipeg's CJOB and CJKR-FM, announced it would buy CJZZ and Kitchener, Ontario's CKBT-FM, from CanWest, subject to CRTC approval. The transaction was approved by the CRTC on July 6, 2007. Corus Entertainment officially took ownership of CJZZ on July 29, 2007. On November 5, 2007, the station rebranded as Groove FM, and changed its call letters to CJGV-FM.

In April 2010, Corus Radio Winnipeg announced the future relocation of its radio broadcast facility to 1440 Rapelje Avenue (since renamed Jack Blick Avenue), as part of a lease agreement between Corus Entertainment and Cadillac Fairview. The relocation to studios and offices in Polo Park was originally slated for January 2011. CJOB, CJGV and CJKR would become the anchor tenants. Corus Radio Winnipeg planned to occupy the second floor of the three-story building, upsizing its radio, production and business operations to 17,500 square feet (1,630 m^{2}).

In August 2011, Corus filed an application with the CRTC to remove the requirement for the station to broadcast a specialty smooth jazz format, citing significant financial losses in recent years. On November 30, 2011, the CRTC approved CJGV's application, although requiring it to maintain two hours of smooth jazz content per-week.

=== Adult contemporary era ===
Logo as Peggy @ 99.1

On December 1, 2011, the station began playing Christmas music for the holiday season, and announced plans to flip to adult contemporary on January 1, 2012. On that date, CJGV-FM flipped to a hot AC format branded as simply 99.1 FM, before ultimately adopting Corus's "Fresh FM" brand on February 14, 2012. On February 13, 2015, the station rebranded as 99.1 Fresh Radio, and segued to a modern adult contemporary format adding more alternative rock crossovers.

On December 25, 2016, at 5 p.m., following the conclusion of its Christmas music programming, CJGV-FM re-launched as Peggy @ 99.1 with an adult contemporary format featuring current music and past hits going back to the 1980s. Corus described the station as reflecting "the positive, energetic and fun vibe of Winnipeg while giving listeners the music they want." In March 2017, its call letters were changed to CFPG-FM to match the new branding.

=== Country 99 ===
On September 26, 2023, Corus announced that it had released CFPG's on-air staff, in preparation for a change in format. On December 1, during interim Christmas music programming for the holiday season, Corus announced that CFPG-FM would flip to country music as Country 99 on December 27. The new format competes primarily with CFQX-FM and CIUR-FM.
