= Genesis Storytime =

Genesis Storytime was a cable TV channel founded in 1983 in Canada by Art Doerksen and Greg Stetski and distributed to several cable TV systems throughout the USA. Its mascot is named Robbie Rainbow.

It was a 24-hour channel that functioned as an "electronic storybook" of sorts, that featured several digitally redrawn children's books, such as Eric Hill's Spot the Dog series, and Christian children's stories as well. It displayed each page of a story on-screen, and would draw each page's graphics somewhat slowly, due to the technology of the time. There was no sound transmitted with the channel since Genesis Storytime was meant to be read out loud by a parent reading a story displayed to a child. Some cable TV companies, however, would feed some audio source (such as a terrestrial or satellite-fed radio station or other audio source received by the cable TV company) along with the channel in place of its silence.

The books were redrawn digitally (using NAPLPS) because of the way Genesis Storytime was distributed to the cable TV headends. It relied on decoders originally used for the Canadian NAPLPS-based Telidon videotex system installed at the headend, with the graphical data for the stories to be displayed being fed to the Telidon decoders via a data stream. Satellite delivery to the headend began in November 1983 from Satellite Syndicated Systems, a company that distributed data for teletext and other services. The data was then decoded and displayed as graphics by the decoder, with the decoder's video output being fed to a cable TV channel. This meant that Genesis Storytime was distributed on a cable TV system as a regular channel viewable on any regular TV set, without any set-top decoder required.

Genesis Storytime's logo was a red heart in a black box, which would blink in the corner of the screen whenever the next page was about to come up.

Although being Canadian in origin, Genesis Storytime was mainly distributed in the USA because of Canadian Radio-television and Telecommunications Commission regulations that hindered the distribution of Genesis Storytime in Canada. VSP-7, a public-access channel in Winnipeg, did air the channel as a 30-minute program on the schedule, ending the program even if a story was not completed.

Genesis Research Corporation was not allowed to appear before the CRTC in early 1984 (the Hearings that lead to the licensing of MuchMusic, TSN, Telelatino) because they had filed an incomplete application.

Contracts were signed with the publishers of the children's books for converting the content to Telidon Format. Genesis StoryTime was later known as StoryVision Network, and then was closed down in 1997.

Decades later, finding any trace of Genesis StoryTime on the Internet leaves very few results because most people did not record the channel from cable-tv to home videotape formats.
