= Ridgetown =

- Unincorporated community
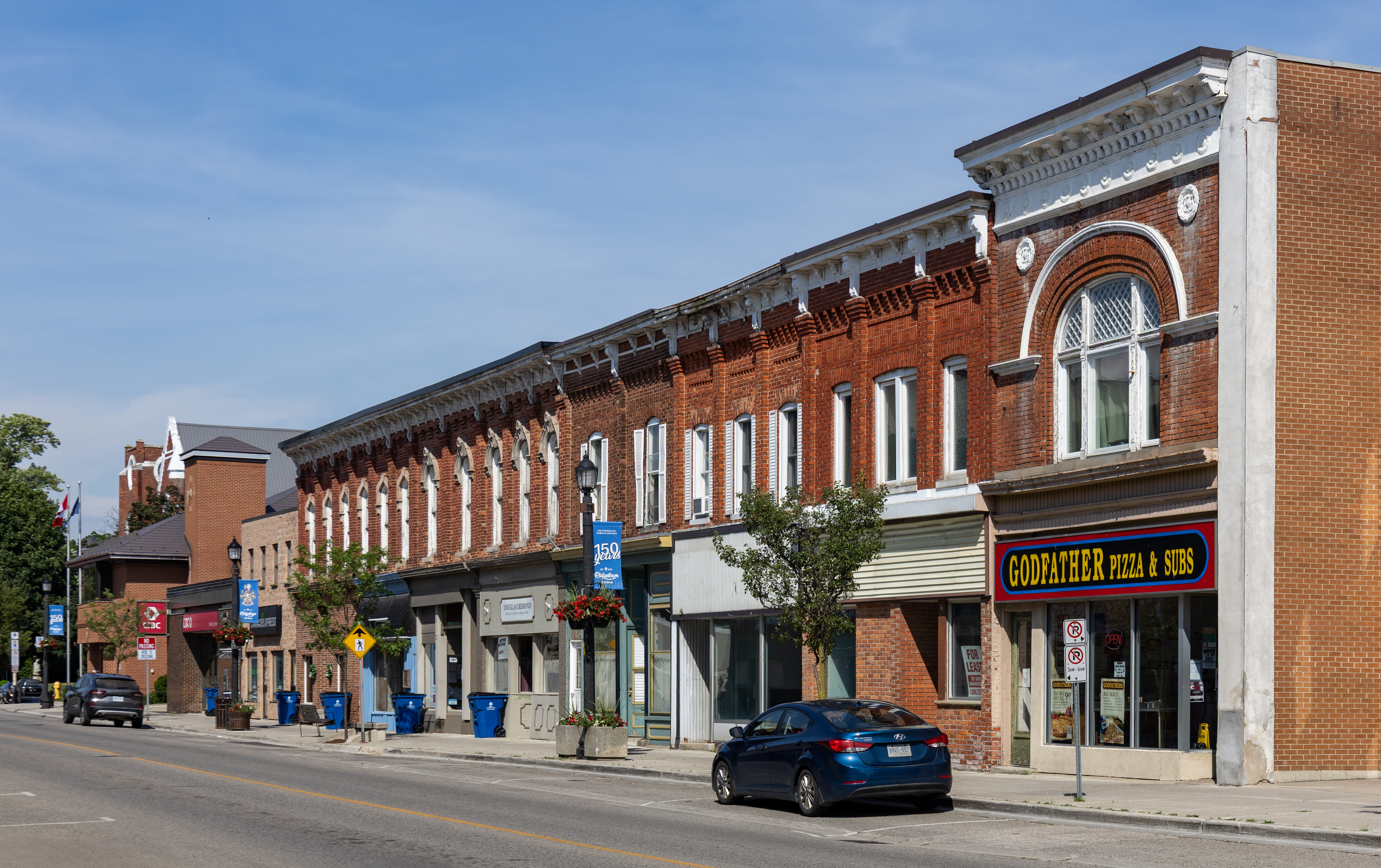
- Main Street

- Location within Municipality of Chatham-Kent Location within Southern Ontario
- Coordinates: 42°26′26″N 81°53′3″W
- Country: Canada
- Province: Ontario
- Municipality: Chatham-Kent
- Incorporated (village): 1875
- Time zone: UTC-5 (EST)
  - Summer (DST): UTC-4 (EDT)
- Forward sortation area: N0P
- Area codes: 519 and 226
- NTS Map: 040I05
- GNBC Code: FCLBC
- Website: ridgetown.com

Ridgetown is a community located in south-east Chatham-Kent, Ontario, Canada. It is home to the University of Guelph Ridgetown Campus. It has a 2021 population of 2,797 and is one of many small farming communities in Chatham-Kent. The town motto is, "Agriculture at its best”.

== History ==
Named for the ridge where the town is located. The ridge divides the north and south watersheds of the area. Post office dates from 1853. Ridgetown was incorporated as a village in 1875 with just over 2,000 citizens. In 1975, with well over 3,220 residents, Ridgetown celebrated its centennial. Residents celebrated by dressing in 1875 costumes, conducting beard-growing contests, barbecues, and other activities.

The Rotary Club of Ridgetown bought the Galbraith house and formed the Ridgetown Historical Society. The Ridge House Museum is now a living history museum that gets many visitors.

The name of Ridgetown came from it being situated on a gravel ridge, a remnant of the glacier age. The families Marsh, Mitton, Watson, Scane and Colby were the first settlers. William "Daddy" Marsh, who was known for making up far-fetched stories, once said that at York (now Toronto) where they were from, he climbed up a tall tree, saw the ridge and the plentiful land and said that was the place to be.

Today, with 2,797 residents (2021 Canadian Census), Ridgetown proudly shares the outlying areas that produce major crops such as soybeans, corn, wheat, grains, and field vegetables.

The water supply is drawn from a number of deep wells around the town and is not connected to a piped system from a lake or river.

The railway tracks of the Canada Southern/Michigan Central/New York Central and Detroit River and Lake Erie/Pere Marquette/C&O railways used to run through Ridgetown, though these are both gone now – the last steam train through Ridgetown was in 2005. The railways formed an important part of Ridgetown's heritage, because there had been competition between Ridgetown and Morpeth (now a small hamlet on Highway 3 - Talbot Trail) to get them. Ridgetown 'won' and expanded, to the everlasting cost of Morpeth which had to that point been advantageously situated on the major east-west highway in the area.

== Climate and geography ==
The climate is mild, being moderated by Lake Erie which is seven kilometres to the south. Summer days can be hot and humid. In winter, Ridgetown is not in the snowbelt which begins near London, Ontario, hence snow accumulation is generally less in comparison.

In 2007, plans to install a line of electricity-generating wind turbines several kilometres to the south of town, along Highway 3 between Morpeth and Blenheim, were in development. This was one of four wind turbine projects approved for Chatham-Kent in 2007.

Ridgetown is located in the middle of a low morainic ridge. Originally under water, in the melting of the last ice age, the "Ridgetown island" appeared. The ridge is approximately 13,000 years old.

Climate data for Ridgetown (1991–2020 normals, extremes 1885–present)
| Month | Jan | Feb | Mar | Apr | May | Jun | Jul | Aug | Sep | Oct | Nov | Dec | Year |
|---|---|---|---|---|---|---|---|---|---|---|---|---|---|
| Record high °C (°F) | 17.2 (63.0) | 19.4 (66.9) | 25.6 (78.1) | 31.1 (88.0) | 33.9 (93.0) | 37.2 (99.0) | 40.6 (105.1) | 36.7 (98.1) | 37.2 (99.0) | 31.9 (89.4) | 23.9 (75.0) | 18.5 (65.3) | 40.6 (105.1) |
| Mean daily maximum °C (°F) | −0.7 (30.7) | 0.5 (32.9) | 5.6 (42.1) | 12.7 (54.9) | 19.3 (66.7) | 25.0 (77.0) | 27.2 (81.0) | 26.1 (79.0) | 22.7 (72.9) | 15.8 (60.4) | 8.4 (47.1) | 2.4 (36.3) | 13.7 (56.7) |
| Daily mean °C (°F) | −4.5 (23.9) | −3.6 (25.5) | 1.2 (34.2) | 7.4 (45.3) | 13.7 (56.7) | 19.3 (66.7) | 21.4 (70.5) | 20.3 (68.5) | 16.9 (62.4) | 10.8 (51.4) | 4.5 (40.1) | −0.8 (30.6) | 8.9 (48.0) |
| Mean daily minimum °C (°F) | −8.2 (17.2) | −7.7 (18.1) | −3.1 (26.4) | 2.0 (35.6) | 8.1 (46.6) | 13.6 (56.5) | 15.6 (60.1) | 14.6 (58.3) | 11.0 (51.8) | 5.7 (42.3) | 0.6 (33.1) | −4.2 (24.4) | 4.0 (39.2) |
| Record low °C (°F) | −29.4 (−20.9) | −31.9 (−25.4) | −25.1 (−13.2) | −12.2 (10.0) | −6.7 (19.9) | −2.2 (28.0) | 2.8 (37.0) | 0.6 (33.1) | −4.5 (23.9) | −10.0 (14.0) | −20.0 (−4.0) | −27.0 (−16.6) | −31.9 (−25.4) |
| Average precipitation mm (inches) | 83.4 (3.28) | 60.8 (2.39) | 64.4 (2.54) | 86.5 (3.41) | 83.1 (3.27) | 77.8 (3.06) | 75.0 (2.95) | 74.2 (2.92) | 81.3 (3.20) | 72.2 (2.84) | 73.9 (2.91) | 70.1 (2.76) | 902.8 (35.54) |
| Average rainfall mm (inches) | 25.6 (1.01) | 36.1 (1.42) | 66.6 (2.62) | 73.0 (2.87) | 76.8 (3.02) | 82.1 (3.23) | 92.8 (3.65) | 104.9 (4.13) | 92.9 (3.66) | 55.4 (2.18) | 84.2 (3.31) | 61.1 (2.41) | 851.4 (33.52) |
| Average snowfall cm (inches) | 28.6 (11.3) | 25.4 (10.0) | 15.2 (6.0) | 4.5 (1.8) | 0.0 (0.0) | 0.0 (0.0) | 0.0 (0.0) | 0.0 (0.0) | 0.0 (0.0) | 0.1 (0.0) | 9.0 (3.5) | 34.5 (13.6) | 117.3 (46.2) |
| Average precipitation days (≥ 0.2 mm) | 16.7 | 14.3 | 13.7 | 14.6 | 14.3 | 13.1 | 11.3 | 10.7 | 11.5 | 12.7 | 14.0 | 15.5 | 162.4 |
| Average rainy days (≥ 0.2 mm) | 3.4 | 4.7 | 9.3 | 11.9 | 12.2 | 11.1 | 9.8 | 10.8 | 11.0 | 11.5 | 11.5 | 7.5 | 114.8 |
| Average snowy days (≥ 0.2 cm) | 8.1 | 6.3 | 4.3 | 1.2 | 0.07 | 0.0 | 0.0 | 0.0 | 0.0 | 0.13 | 2.6 | 7.7 | 30.3 |
| Average relative humidity (%) (at 1500 LST) | 78.4 | 75.1 | 68.9 | 59.2 | 59.8 | 58.9 | 60.3 | 63.1 | 61.9 | 63.1 | 70.5 | 79.0 | 66.5 |
Source: Environment and Climate Change Canada (rainfall/snowfall 1971–2000)

== Education ==
Ridgetown has 3 schools. The high school in Ridgetown, Ridgetown District High School (RDHS), has just under 300 students in grades 7-12. In recent years, declining enrolment made it difficult for the Lambton Kent District School Board (LKDSB) to ensure a future for RDHS. As a result, vocal community groups have banded together to fight for and ensure the viability of the high school. If the high school were to close, students would have to be bussed to Chatham city schools. In 2006, RDHS became involved with a trial of video schooling - tying three area high schools together with one teacher.

RDHS made history in 2005 when the Drama Club entered the Sears Drama Festival with the play "The Empty Chair" written by Tim Kelly. The Drama Club worked from the summer of 2004 until performance night in February 2005 at the Chatham Cultural Centre. Out of 12 high schools from across the district, Ridgetown moved on to the Regional level for the first time in nearly 20 years.

The elementary schools (St. Michael Catholic School, Naahii Ridge Public School) serve a wide area of eastern Chatham-Kent, with many students being bussed in from the countryside. Naahii Ridge Public School is also operated by the LKDSB. St. Michael is under the jurisdiction of the St. Clair Catholic District School Board.

The former Ridgetown College opened in 1922 as Western Ontario Experimental Farm as a research facility, was renamed in 1951 as Western Ontario Agricultural School and was established by the Ontario Department of Agriculture as a teaching school although courses had begun as early as 1936. It was renamed again as Ridgetown College of Agriculture and Technology in 1968. It has been part of the University of Guelph since 1997 and is now University of Guelph, Ridgetown Campus. It is a venue for OAC- the Ontario Agricultural College. About 600 students presently attend 2 and 3-year courses on agriculture, veterinary technology, graphical information systems, horticulture and environmental management.

== Industry and small business ==
Ridgetown has a thriving manufacturing industry, mainly serving the automotive market, which employ hundreds of local and area people. Martinrea, KSR International, Waltron Trailers, Trak Tool Machines, and Challenger Pallet are the larger plants.

Tens of smaller service businesses thrive in the area, including many long-established and unique stores in the downtown area.

Though no longer headquartered in Ridgetown, L.H Gray & Son was founded in Ridgetown in 1969. The following year, its brand Gray Ridge Eggs was created.
