= CJOB =

Radio station in Winnipeg

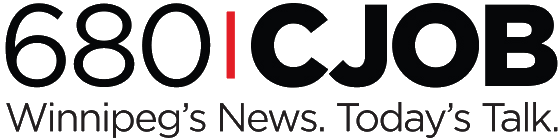
- Winnipeg, Manitoba; Canada
- Broadcast area: Southern Manitoba
- Frequency: 680 kHz
- Branding: 680 CJOB

Programming
- Format: News/talk
- Affiliations: Winnipeg Jets; Winnipeg Blue Bombers; Manitoba Moose

Ownership
- Owner: Corus Entertainment; (Corus Premium Television Ltd.)
- Sister stations: CFPG-FM, CJKR-FM, CKND-DT

History
- First air date: March 11, 1946
- Former frequencies: 1340 kHz (1946–1957)
- Call sign meaning: John Oliver Blick (original owner)

Technical information
- Class: B
- Power: 50,000 watts
- Transmitter coordinates: 49°39′14.04″N 97°11′30.84″W

Links
- Website: globalnews.ca/radio/cjob

CJOB (680 AM) is a commercial radio station in Winnipeg, Manitoba, Canada. It is owned and operated by Corus Entertainment and airs a news/talk format with news and sports programs. CJOB and its sister stations, CFPG-FM, CJKR-FM, and CKND-DT, have studios and offices at 201 Portage in Downtown Winnipeg.

The transmitter tower array is located off Floodway Road near Saint Adolphe. CJOB operates at 50,000 watts (the highest power permitted for Canadian AM stations), but because 680 kHz is a clear channel frequency, CJOB must use a directional antenna at all times to avoid interfering with other stations. Even with this restriction, CJOB's low frequency, transmitter power, and Manitoba's mostly flat land (with near-perfect ground conductivity) allow it to reach almost all of Manitoba during the day.

== History ==
CJOB first signed on at 8 a.m. Monday, March 11, 1946. CJOB was a 250-watt station at 1340 kHz owned by John Oliver Blick (the JOB in the call sign)

The station moved to 680 kHz and increased its power to 5,000 watts on October 8, 1957. At the same time it installed a new antenna 90 metres (294 ft) high in Fort Whyte, Manitoba, 5 kilometres (3 mi) west of Hwy. 75.

In 1959, CJOB applied to the Board of Broadcast Governors (BBG), under the name Perimeter Television Broadcasters Ltd., to build Winnipeg's first private television station, but were unsuccessful. The licence was issued to Moffat Broadcasting, which put CJAY-TV on the air in November 1960.

The station moved in October 1962 to 930 Portage Avenue, temporarily sharing space with Sun Life, who moved to Broadway.

CJOB was sold to OB Limited in 1964.

In 1978, CJOB's broadcast power increased to 50,000 watts during the daytime, making it the province's second-most powerful station, after 990 CBW, powered at 50,000 watts day and night.

In 1998, CJOB was sold to Western International Communications.

In 2000, CJOB was sold to Corus Entertainment..

In 2006, the station celebrated 60 years on-the-air.

On February 9, 2006, CJOB launches AIR680 Chopper, in partnership with MB Lottery's Corp. and contracted with the Canadian Traffic Network, Winnipeg's only helicopter traffic reports

In 2007, CJOB asked the Canadian Radio-television and Telecommunications Commission (CRTC) for a nested FM frequency at 106.3 transmitter at Starbuck to rebroadcast CJOB (AM) (mono). On September 7, the CRTC denied Corus's application to simulcast the AM radio signal at 106.3 MHz.

In April 2010, Corus Radio Winnipeg announced the future relocation of its radio broadcast facility to 1440 Rapelje Avenue (since renamed Jack Blick Avenue, after the station's founder), as part of a lease agreement between Corus Entertainment and Cadillac Fairview. The relocation to Polo Park was originally slated for January 2011. CJOB 680, CJGV-FM 99.1 (Groove FM) and CJKR-FM 97.5 (Power 97) would become the anchor tenants. Corus Radio Winnipeg planned to occupy the second floor of the three-story building, upsizing its radio, production and business operations to 17,500 square feet (1,630 m^{2}). At the time, general manager Garth Buchko said the stations had outgrown their 930 Portage Avenue facility. With the move, Corus Radio Winnipeg would also upgrade to state-of-the-art, fully digital on-air systems.

At the end of February 2011, CJOB completed the move to its new location at 1440 Jack Blick Avenue.

On March 11, 2011, CJOB celebrated 65 years on-the-air.

In the spring of 2015, CJOB lost its long-held first place status as Winnipeg's highest-rated radio station to CBC Radio One station 990 CBW.

In September 2017, CJOB cancelled a five-year contract with the Canadian Traffic Network, grounding Winnipeg's only news and traffic reporting helicopter, known as Skyview-1. Skyview-1's debut had coincided with the launch on February 6, 2012, of Global TV's The Morning News program, which aired from 6-9 am.

In 2021, CJOB, along with its sister stations, moved in with Corus's Global Television studios at 3000-201 Portage Ave Winnipeg.

== Programming ==
CJOB airs local talk shows during the day, with news-intensive segments during AM and PM drive time. Evenings, CJOB has a sports talk show. Weekends feature shows on health, travel, food, technology and cars.

Past programming on the station has included the syndicated talk shows Charles Adler Tonight and The Shift with Drex.

The station broadcasts play-by-play coverage of several sports teams, including the Winnipeg Blue Bombers, Manitoba Moose, and Winnipeg Sea Bears. CJOB was a broadcaster of the original Winnipeg Jets of the WHA and NHL from 1972 to 1982, and again from 1992 to 1996, prior to their relocation to Arizona. On October 5, 2020, the current incarnation of the team announced that it would move its radio broadcasts to CJOB under a seven-year deal. CJKR-FM will simulcast all Jets broadcasts on FM.

== Rebroadcasters ==
CJOB also has rebroadcasters in the following communities:

Rebroadcasters of CJOB
City of licence	Identifier	Frequency	RECNet	CRTC Decision
Gillam	CFIL-FM	97.1 FM	Query	
Jenpeg	CJEN-FM	96.1 FM	Query	
Limestone	CHGG-FM	96.1 FM	Query	

CJOB is also available on Shaw Direct satellite channel 861.
