= CoolTV =

- CoolTV logo
- Country: Canada
- Broadcast area: National
- Headquarters: Winnipeg, Manitoba, Canada

Ownership
- Owner: Canwest Media Inc. (Canwest)

History
- Launched: September 4, 2003
- Closed: July 21, 2008

CoolTV was a Canadian English language category 2 digital cable specialty channel dedicated to the musical genres of jazz, blues and world music; including music videos, movies, concerts, and television series. Based in Winnipeg, Manitoba, CoolTV was owned by Canwest Media, a division of Canwest Global Communications.

== History ==
In November 2000, Global Television Network Inc. (a subsidiary of Canwest Global Communications) was granted a television broadcasting licence by the Canadian Radio-television and Telecommunications Commission (CRTC) called The Jazz Channel, described as "a national English-language Category 2 specialty music video television service dedicated to jazz, blues and world music."

The channel launched in September 2003 as CoolTV, and was initially headed by former CBC Radio broadcaster Ross Porter, who left in 2004 to head up CJRT-FM in Toronto.

From 2003 to 2007, Canwest operated a radio station in Winnipeg, CoolFM, which served as an adjunct to CoolTV. The radio station was sold to Corus Entertainment in 2007 and rebranded "Groove FM".

On July 21, 2008, CoolTV ceased operations. Canwest cited growth potential, profitability and warranting investment for its reasons to discontinue the service.

The closure of CoolTV did not put an end to Canwest's financial turmoil as the company ultimately declared bankruptcy in 2009 and its broadcast assets were sold to Shaw Media in 2010 but acquired by Corus in 2016.
