= CJKR-FM =

Radio station in Winnipeg, Manitoba

Coordinates: 49°46′57″N 97°12′55″W

- Winnipeg, Manitoba; Canada
- Broadcast area: Winnipeg Metropolitan Region
- Frequency: 97.5 MHz
- Branding: Power 97

Programming
- Format: Classic alternative
- Affiliations: Winnipeg Jets

Ownership
- Owner: Corus Entertainment; (Corus Premium Television Ltd.)
- Sister stations: CJOB, CFPG-FM, CKND-DT

History
- First air date: May 27, 1948
- Former call signs: CJOB-FM (1948–1976); CHMM-FM (1976–1984); CKIS-FM (1984–1991)

Technical information
- Licensing authority: CRTC
- Class: C
- ERP: 57,196 watts average 93,900 watts peak
- HAAT: 184.6 metres (606 ft)

Links
- Webcast: Listen Live
- Website: power97.com

CJKR-FM (97.5 MHz) is a Canadian radio station broadcasting in Winnipeg, Manitoba. It airs a classic alternative format with the on-air brand name "Power 97". The station is owned and operated by Corus Entertainment, which also owns sister stations CJOB and CFPG-FM. The studios and offices are located at 201 Portage Avenue in downtown Winnipeg, while its transmitter is located on Brady Road in south Winnipeg.

CJKR was formerly the most powerful FM radio station in Canada, operating with 310,000 watts. Most FM stations in Canada and the United States run 100,000 watts or less. Because CJKR-FM is one of the oldest FM stations in Canada, it was grandfathered with a much higher power. (In Winnipeg, CBW-FM also operates with an unusually high power, 160,000 watts). Following a fire to its transmitter in 2021, the station has been operating on reduced power, with plans to install a new HD Radio antenna operating at 93,900 watts. Power 97 is simulcast on Shaw Direct channel 860.

== History ==
The station first signed on the air on May 27, 1948 as CJOB-FM, an FM simulcast of CJOB. The station applied to the Board of Broadcast Governors (BBG) to move its broadcast frequency from 103.1 MHz to the current 97.5 MHz. It began airing distinct programming in 1962, featured a country format as CHMM-FM in the late 1970s and early 1980s, and then changed its format to soft rock and its call sign to CKIS-FM in 1984. In the late 1980s, CKIS moved to a rock format, which was not in compliance with its licence at that time. Eventually, the station was allowed to amend its licence, stick with the rock format, and changed its call letters to CJKR-FM in 1991. In the late 2000s, the station moved from mainstream rock to active rock by reducing the classic rock in its playlist, aiming at a youthful male audience.

=== Changing owners and studios ===
In 2000, Western International Communications sold its Winnipeg stations to Corus Entertainment. In April 2010, Corus Radio Winnipeg announced the relocation of its radio broadcast facility to 1440 Rapelje Avenue (since renamed Jack Blick Avenue), as part of a lease agreement between Corus Entertainment and Cadillac Fairview. The relocation to Polo Park was scheduled for January 2011. CJOB, CJGV-FM and CJKR-FM would become the anchor tenants. Corus Radio Winnipeg planned to occupy the second floor of the three-storey building, expanding its radio, production and business operations to 17,500 square feet (1,630 m^{2}). At the time, general manager Garth Buchko said the stations had outgrown their 930 Portage Avenue facility. With the move, Corus Radio Winnipeg would also upgrade to state-of-the-art, fully digital on-air systems. At the end of February 2011, CJKR-FM completed the move to its new location at 1440 Jack Blick Avenue.

As of April 2021, the three stations are again back in downtown Winnipeg at 201 Portage Avenue. It is unknown when they were moved to this current location.

=== Big FM ===
At Noon on January 29, 2015, after playing "Fade to Black" by Metallica, CJKR began stunting with liners promoting that Winnipeg would be getting "bigger" the following day at 8 a.m., interspersed between 5-second clips of songs with the word "big" in them. At that time, CJKR flipped to a classic rock format as 97.5 Big FM, putting it in direct competition with long-time classic rock station CITI-FM (although that station still plays current rock songs describing itself as mainstream rock). The first song on "Big" was "Big Time" by Peter Gabriel. The new format was being described as a "homage to Winnipeg's rock heritage", with a playlist that is "familiar, and less predictable and has rock credibility". In November 2015, veteran broadcaster Shadoe Davis was hired for "The Shadoe Davis Show" from 6-10am weekdays. In March, he was joined by another veteran Winnipeg broadcaster, Joe Aiello. "Shadoe & Joe" can now be heard together with traffic reports from Randy Parker and news with Kathy Kennedy.

=== Return to Power 97 ===
Logo under previous slogan

On August 12, 2016, CJKR rebranded back to Power 97, and returned to its active rock format. The first song played on the newly relaunched "Power 97" was Give It Away by Red Hot Chili Peppers.

On October 5, 2020, it was announced that CJKR will serve as FM co-flagship of the Winnipeg Jets under a seven-year deal with Corus, with games airing in simulcast with sister AM station CJOB. During game broadcasts, CJKR's rock format is heard on the station's online stream.

On October 8, 2024, CJKR flipped to classic alternative, while retaining the Power 97 branding.
