= CHMI-DT =

Television station in Portage la Prairie, Manitoba

- Portage la Prairie–Winnipeg, Manitoba; Canada
- City: Portage la Prairie, Manitoba
- Channels: Digital: 13 (VHF); Virtual: 13
- Branding: Citytv Winnipeg (general); CityNews Winnipeg (newscasts)

Programming
- Affiliations: 13.1: Citytv

Ownership
- Owner: Rogers Sports & Media; (Rogers Media Inc.)
- Sister stations: TV: Sportsnet West; Radio: CITI-FM, CKY-FM

History
- First air date: October 17, 1986
- Former call signs: CHMI-TV (1986–2011)
- Former channel numbers: Analog: 13 (VHF, 1986–2011)
- Former affiliations: Independent (1986–1999); A-Channel (1999–2005)
- Call sign meaning: Manitoba Independent

Technical information
- Licensing authority: CRTC
- ERP: 8.3 kW
- HAAT: 324.3 m (1,064 ft)
- Transmitter coordinates: 49°52′26″N 97°44′27″W

Links
- Website: Citytv Winnipeg

CHMI-DT (channel 13) is a television station licensed to Portage la Prairie, Manitoba, Canada, serving the Winnipeg area as an owned-and-operated station of the Citytv network, a division of Rogers Sports & Media. The station has studios at 8 Forks Market Road (near Fort Gibraltar Trail and Waterfront Drive) in downtown Winnipeg, and its transmitter is located adjacent to Bohn Road (near Provincial Road 245) in Cartier.

CHMI signed on the air in 1986 as the Manitoba Television Network (MTN) by Craig Broadcast Systems. Broadcasting from studios downtown in the historic Canadian National Railway Power House at The Forks, it was the first new commercial TV station in Winnipeg since 1975. The station then joined the A-Channel system in 1999; its style of news and programming was young and aggressive. Ratings settled into third place, above the CBC but behind the established private stations in town, CKY and CKND.

Craig, overextended by its launch of Toronto 1 in 2003, sold itself to CHUM Limited, then-owner of Citytv, in 2004. In 2005, the A-Channel stations took on the Citytv brand. Due to poor ratings and as part of a wave of layoffs, CHUM reduced the size of its local operation in Winnipeg in 2006, cancelling the station's evening newscast. CHUM sold most of its assets to Bell Globemedia that same year; as Bell owned the CTV Television Network, the Citytv stations were spun off to Rogers and for a brief period, it was paired with religious station CIIT (Omni 11) before being sold to S-VOX in 2008. The station continued producing a morning newscast under the Breakfast Television brand until 2015 when it was replaced with a simulcast of CITI-FM's morning show and reinstated evening local news programs in 2017.

== Craig Media ==
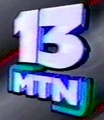
The original Manitoba Television Network, or MTN, logo was used from 1986–1995.

The second MTN logo was used from 1995–1999.

=== MTN ===
In August 1980, Western Manitoba Broadcasters Ltd., owner of Brandon-based CKX-TV, met with community and business leaders to reveal their plan to start a new Portage la Prairie-based television station, with transmitter in Elie, Manitoba. The new station would employ about 20 people. There was no mention of what network it would connect to, but Craig hoped for ease of regulations that would allow him to pull in a network from the U.S. via satellite for programming. Originally some of the television programming would come from CBC Television, as like CKX, but after the CBC said they would not allow another competitive CBC broadcaster in the region because it would duplicate and cannibalize ad revenue of CBWT, Western Manitoba Broadcasters withdrew this part of the application.

An application was made in 1981 for a 287,000-watt station transmitting on VHF channel 13. Their application for a television license was denied by the Canadian Radio-television and Telecommunications Commission (CRTC) in 1981 due to "vague" programming promises.

When CKND-TV applied to the CRTC for extension of their signal into the Westman area via a transmitter in Minnedosa, CKX-TV filed an intervention opposing it, saying it would harm CKX's ad revenue. The regulatory body decided in CKX's favour. Despite this, CKND-TV-2 Minnedosa was granted a license and began broadcasting at 6 p.m. September 1, 1982.

Western Manitoba Broadcasters Ltd. applied to the CRTC again in 1985, this time promising to create a larger news department, with news bureaus in Winnipeg, Portage, Brandon and Dauphin. They intended on using call letters CPLP-TV, but later decided on CHMI-TV. The station would be seen on VHF channel 13, the last available clear channel in the region. Future licensed television stations would have to broadcast on UHF frequencies. The licensing hearing was held on December 3, 1985, in Winnipeg.

The station was licensed by the CRTC on May 8, 1986, and owned by Craig Media with a condition of licence that the station would not solicit advertising from businesses located in Winnipeg. This was to protect existing Winnipeg television stations. The station went on the air on October 17, 1986 where it was originally branded as the Manitoba Television Network or MTN. Although it has always been a Winnipeg station for all intents and purposes, for its first decade it was not allowed to sell advertising in Winnipeg.

Mark Evans was initially MTN's news director, before being replaced a year later by Al Thorgeirson.

While this logo was being used on its Alberta counterparts years before, CHMI adopted the A-Channel branding in 1999. It was dropped in 2005 when CHUM bought Craig Media.

MTN was well known for its Prairie Pulse News (later retitled MTN Pulse News, and then MTN News), MTN Kids Club, and Prime Ticket Movies, the last of which would carry over to the A-Channel system. The station's initial slogan was "Very independent, very Manitoba!"

=== A-Channel ===
In the fall of 1999, Craig Media moved the station's production facilities to the refurbished former Canadian National Railway Power House at The Forks in Winnipeg and rebranded the station as A-Channel, joining CKEM-TV in Edmonton and CKAL-TV in Calgary—effectively uniting Craig's non-CBC affiliates under the A-Channel banner. Technical operations for the station remained in Portage la Prairie.

At a CRTC hearing in Saskatoon in November 1999, Craig Broadcast Systems applied to take over the IMTV transmitter located in Dauphin on VHF channel 6. The signal would extend CHMI's reach into the Parkland region with a 44,000 watt signal. The former IMTV transmitter began broadcasting A-Channel in 2000.

=== Acquisition by CHUM ===
On April 12, 2004, CHUM Limited announced a deal to purchase Craig Media for $265 million. The move came more than a month after the CRTC denied CHUM's applications for new Calgary and Edmonton stations because the market did not have sufficient advertising revenue to support a new entrant. The sale was approved by the Canadian Radio-television and Telecommunications Commission on November 19, 2004. CHUM had to sell off Toronto 1 because it already owned stations in Toronto (CITY) and nearby Barrie (CKVR); Toronto 1 was sold to Quebecor Media, owners of the media units TVA and Sun Media.

== Citytv ==
=== Rebrand and news cuts ===
In addition to launching The Bounce and becoming the sole owner of Access Media Group in February 2005 in Alberta, CHUM announced that it would rebrand the three A-Channel stations—in Calgary, Edmonton, and Winnipeg—as Citytv, aligning with the stations it already owned in Toronto and Vancouver. No other significant changes were made, since the A-Channel stations' on-air look had always been very similar to that of Citytv; they initially retained their local programs, relaunched under Citytv's Breakfast Television morning brand and CityNews news brand. CHUM hoped to lift the stations' ratings with the new moniker. The change took effect on August 2 of the same year, when the A-Channel name was transferred to CHUM's NewNet stations.

On June 13, 2006, CHUM announced that it would dramatically reduce its newsgathering operations in Edmonton, Calgary, and Winnipeg, as well as in several other cities. It laid off 195 part- and full-time employees. The evening newscasts were cancelled, while the noon newscast and Breakfast Television remained on the air. In a coincidental development, that same day, BCE Inc., the parent company of CTV, announced it would buy CHUM Limited.

=== Under Rogers ownership ===
The CRTC announced its approval of CTVglobemedia's purchase of CHUM Limited on June 8, 2007, but the commission added a condition that CTVglobemedia sell off CHUM's Citytv stations to another buyer while allowing it to retain the A-Channel stations. The CRTC was not willing to allow CTV-Citytv twinsticks. The following Monday, Rogers Communications agreed to buy the five Citytv stations. The sale was approved by the CRTC on September 28, 2007, and Was completed on October 31, 2007. For a short period, it was paired with sister station, CIIT-TV (Omni 11 Winnipeg), a religious Omni station, before it was sold to S-VOX in 2008.

Between October 2012 and 2018, the station began branding itself on promos and on-screen logos as "City", removing the "tv" portion from its identification. Since 2018, they have reverted to the original "Citytv" branding.

== News operation ==
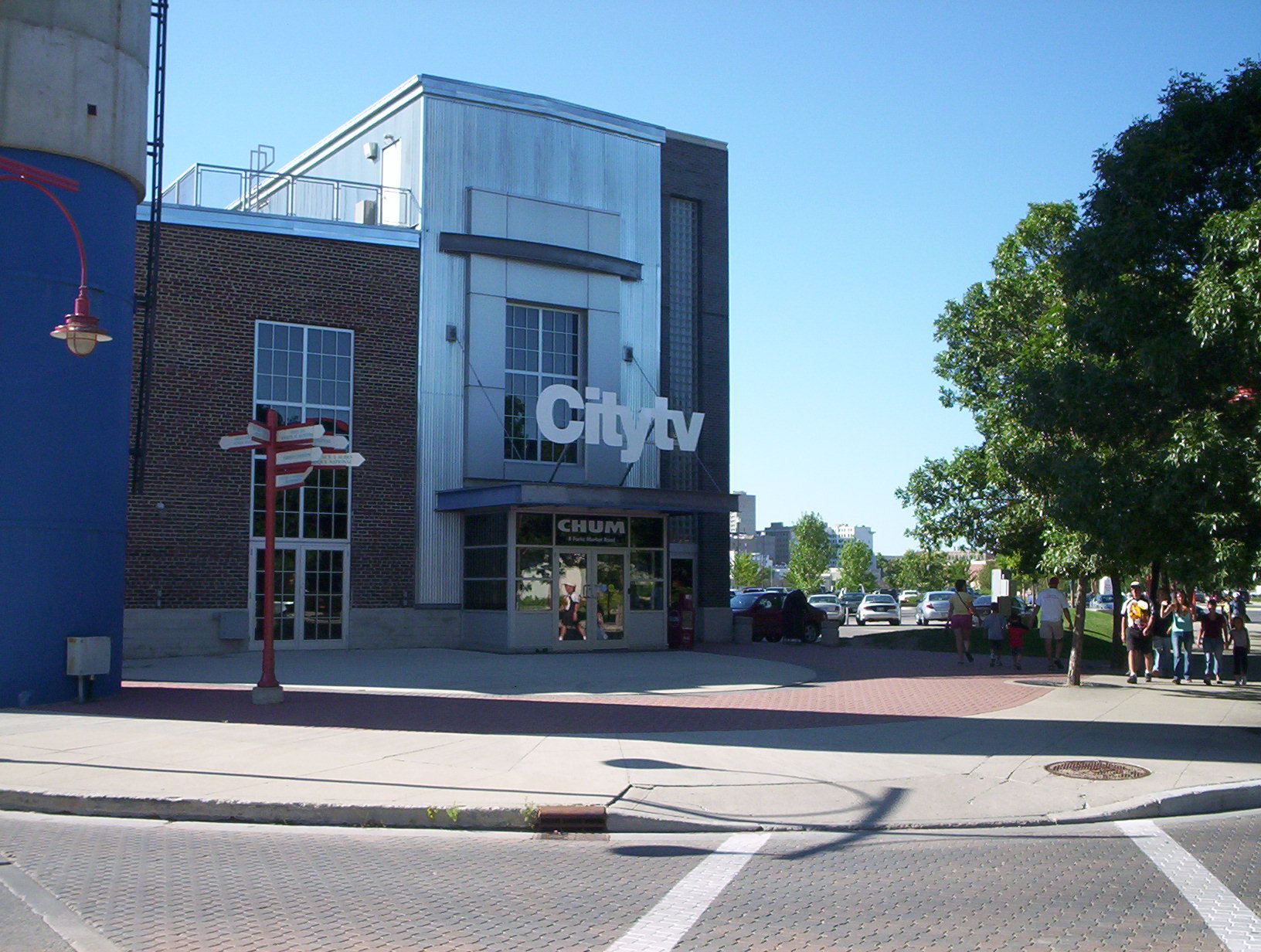
The CHMI Studio as Citytv in August 2005.

When 13MTN began broadcasting in 1986, two local newscasts were presented, one at 5:30 to 6:30 p.m., the other newscast from 10 to 11 p.m. Both programs were called Prairie Pulse Tonight. The first two news anchors were Michael Gligor and Barbara Higgins. Ron Thompson presented the weather forecast from Brandon's CKX studio via a live coaxial cable video link to the Portage studio leased from MTS. Ted Deller replaced Gligor in 1987–88. Diana Ottasen replaced Barbara Higgins. Sports anchor was Keith McMahon.

CHMI-DT currently broadcasts 14 hours of local news, which consists of hour-long broadcasts daily at 6 and 11 p.m. since September 4, 2017. CityNews programs previously aired until July 12, 2006, when it was announced that CTVglobemedia would acquire then-owner CHUM Limited. CHMI also aired a local version of Breakfast Television until 2015, when it was discontinued and replaced with a television simulcast of sister radio station CITI-FM's morning show Wheeler in the Morning. Former BT hosts Drew Kozub and Jenna Khan remained as contributors, hosting television-exclusive news and entertainment segments.

== Technical information ==
=== Subchannel ===
Subchannel of CHMI-DT
Subchannel	Res.	Short name	Programming
13.1	1080i	CityTV	Citytv

=== Analog-to-digital conversion ===
On August 31, 2011, when Canadian television stations in CRTC-designated mandatory markets transitioned from analog to digital broadcasts, CHMI-TV flash cut its digital signal into operation on VHF channel 13.
