= Lambton Kent District School Board =

School board in Ontario, Canada

Lambton Kent District School Board LKDSB

Location
- 200 Wellington Street, Sarnia, Ontario all of Lambton and Chatham-Kent counties Canada
- Coordinates: 42.42607°N 82.18246°W

District information
- Motto: Fostering Success for Every Student Every Day
- Superintendents: E. Dixon, B. Hazzard, B. McKay, G. Girardi, A. Barrese, M. Mancini
- Chair of the board: Kelley Robertson
- Director of education: John Howitt; Gary Girardi (May 2025–)
- Schools: 50 Elementary; 12 Secondary; 2 Adult & Continuing Education Centers
- Budget: CA$282 million (2019-2020)
- District ID: B66036

Students and staff
- Students: 21,600
- Staff: 3,387

Other information
- Vice Chair: David Shortt
- Elected trustees: Greg Agar, Janet Barnes, Jane Bryce, Ruth-Ann Dodman, Roberta Northmore, Jack Fletcher, Malinda Little, Randy Campbell, Angela Richards
- Student trustees: Ellias Ko, Makaiyah Stonefish, Brynn Williams
- Website: www.lkdsb.net

The Lambton Kent District School Board (known as English-language Public District School Board No. 10 prior to 1999) is the school board responsible for public education in Lambton County and Chatham-Kent, Ontario, Canada. Lambton and Kent Counties are made up of numerous small towns and communities situated in Southwestern Ontario, a geographic area surrounded by the Great Lakes.

The board serves over 21,000 elementary and high school students. Surrounding towns and communities include Alvinston, Blenheim, Bothwell, Brigden, Chatham, Corunna, Dresden, Forest, Grand Bend, Merlin, Mooretown, Petrolia, Point Edward, Ridgetown, Sarnia, Thamesville, Tilbury, Wallaceburg, Watford, Wheatley, and Wyoming.

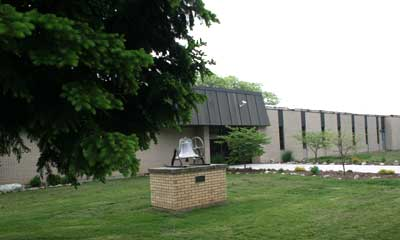
Chatham Regional Education Center, Chatham, Ontario

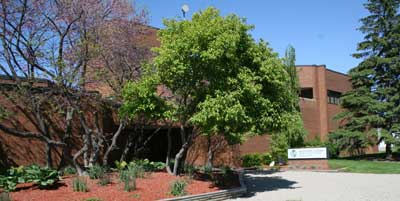
Sarnia Education Center, Sarnia, Ontario

== Board offices ==
The LKDSB has two board office locations, one in Chatham and one in Sarnia, the two biggest cities in the area they serve.

== Secondary schools ==
The high schools or secondary schools managed by the Board are:

School	City	Grades	
Alexander Mackenzie Secondary School	Sarnia	9-12	
Blenheim District High School	Blenheim	9-12	
Chatham-Kent Secondary School	Chatham	9-12	
John McGregor Secondary School	Chatham	9-12	
Lambton Central Collegiate & Vocational Institute	Petrolia	9-12	
Lambton-Kent Composite School	Dresden	9-12	
North Lambton Secondary School	Forest	9-12	
Northern Collegiate Institute and Vocational School	Sarnia	9-12	
Ridgetown District High School	Ridgetown	7-12	
Great Lakes Secondary School	Sarnia	9-12	Consolidated school consisting of St. Clair Secondary School and Sarnia Collegiate Institute and Technical School
Tilbury District High School	Tilbury	9-12	
Wallaceburg District Secondary School	Wallaceburg	7-12	

== Elementary schools ==
List of Public Schools In the Lambton-Kent District School Board
School	City	Grades	Additional Programs	Website
A. A. Wright Public School	Wallaceburg	JK-6	Alternative Learning and Lifeskills Program	http://aawright.lkdsb.net/
Aberarder Central School	Camlachie	JK-8	N/A	http://aberarder.lkdsb.net/
Bosanquet Central Public School	Thedford	JK-8	N/A	http://bosanquet.lkdsb.net/
Bridgeview Public School	Point Edward	JK-8	Alternative Learning and Lifeskills Program	http://bridgeview.lkdsb.net/
Brigden Public School	Bridgen	JK-8	N/A	http://brigden.lkdsb.net/
Bright's Grove Public School	Bright's Grove	JK-8	N/A	http://brightsgrove.lkdsb.net/
Brooke Central Public School	Alvinston	JK-8	French Immersion	http://brooke.lkdsb.net/
Cathcart Boulevard Public School	Sarnia	JK-8	French Immersion	http://cathcart.lkdsb.net/
Colonel Cameron Public School	Corunna	JK-8	N/A	http://colonelcameron.lkdsb.net/
Confederation Central School	Sarnia	JK-8	N/A	http://confederation.lkdsb.net/
Dawn Euphemia Public School	Dresden	JK-8	N/A	http://dawneuphemia.lkdsb.net/
Dresden Area Central School	Dresden	JK-8	N/A	http://dresden.lkdsb.net/
East Lambton Elementary School	Watford	JK-8	N/A	http://eastlambton.lkdsb.net/
Errol Road Public School	Sarnia	JK-8	French Immersion	http://errolroad.lkdsb.net/
Errol Village Public School	Camlachie	JK-8	N/A	http://errolvillage.lkdsb.net/
Grand Bend Public School	Grand Bend	JK-8	N/A	http://grandbend.lkdsb.net/
Gregory Drive Public School	Chatham	JK-8	N/A	http://gregorydrive.lkdsb.net/
Hanna Memorial Public School	Sarnia	JK-8	Alternative Learning and Lifeskills Program	http://hanna.lkdsb.net/
Harwich Raleigh Public School	Blenheim	JK-8	French Immersion	http://harwichraleigh.lkdsb.net/
High Park Public School	Sarnia	JK-8	French Immersion(JK-Gr.6)	http://highpark.lkdsb.net/
Hillcrest Public School	Petrolia	JK-8	Single Track French Immersion	http://hillcrest.lkdsb.net/
H. W. Burgess Public School	Wallaceburg	JK-6	N/A	http://hwburgess.lkdsb.net/
Indian Creek Road Public School	Chatham	JK-8	Alternative Learning and Lifeskills Program	http://indiancreek.lkdsb.net/
King George VI Public School	Chatham	JK-8	N/A	http://kinggeorgec.lkdsb.net/
King George VI Public School	Sarnia	JK-8	N/A	http://kinggeorges.lkdsb.net/
Kinnwood Central Public School	Forest	JK-8	N/A	http://kinnwood.lkdsb.net/
Lakeroad Public School	Sarnia	JK-8	N/A	http://lakeroad.lkdsb.net/
Lambton Centennial Public School	Petrolia	JK-8	N/A	http://centennial.lkdsb.net/
Lansdowne Public School	Sarnia	JK-8	Native Second Language	http://lansdowne.lkdsb.net/
London Road School	Sarnia	JK-8	N/A	http://londonroad.lkdsb.net/
McNaughton Avenue Public School	Chatham	JK-8	French Immersion	http://mcnaughton.lkdsb.net/
Merlin Area Public School	Merlin	JK-8	N/A	http://merlin.lkdsb.net/
Mooretown-Courtright Public School	Mooretown	JK-8	N/A	http://mooretown.lkdsb.net/
Naahii Ridge Elementary School	Ridgetown	JK-6	Native Second Language	http://naahiiridge.lkdsb.net/
P.E. McGibbon Public School	Sarnia	JK-8	N/A	http://hanna.lkdsb.net/
Plympton-Wyoming Public School	Plympton–Wyoming	JK-8	Alternative Learning and Lifeskills Program	http://southplymptonwyoming.lkdsb.net/
Queen Elizabeth II Public School	Chatham	JK-8	N/A	http://queenelizabethc.lkdsb.net/
Queen Elizabeth II Public School	Petrolia	JK-8	N/A	http://queenelizabethp.lkdsb.net/
Queen Elizabeth II School	Sarnia	JK-8	Native Second Language	http://queenelizabeths.lkdsb.net/
Riverview Central School	Port Lambton	JK-8	N/A	http://riverview.lkdsb.net/
Rosedale Public School	Sarnia	JK-8	N/A	http://rosedale.lkdsb.net/
Sir John Moore Community School	Corunna	JK-8	French Immersion, Native Second Language	http://sirjohnmoore.lkdsb.net/
Tecumseh Public School	Chatham	JK-8	Alternative Learning and Lifeskills Program	http://tecumseh.lkdsb.net/
Thamesville Area Central Public School	Thamesville	JK-8	N/A	http://thamesville.lkdsb.net/
Tilbury Area Public School	Tilbury	JK-8	Alternative Learning and Lifeskills Program	http://tilbury.lkdsb.net/
Victor Lauriston Public School	Chatham	JK-8	N/A	http://victor.lkdsb.net/
Wheatley Area Public School	Wheatley, Ontario	JK-8	N/A	http://wheatley.lkdsb.net/
Winston Churchill Public School	Chatham	JK-8	N/A	http://winstonchurchill.lkdsb.net/
W. J. Baird Public School	Blenheim	JK-8	N/A	http://wjbaird.lkdsb.net/
Zone Township Central School	Bothwell, Ontario	JK-8	N/A	http://zone.lkdsb.net/

== Adult and Continuing Education ==
The Lambton Kent District School Board offers a number of programs for those wanting to continue or complete their education.

Locations:
Sarnia office: 1257 Michigan Ave, Sarnia, Ontario

Chatham office: 92 Churchill Street, Chatham, Ontario

== 'Community Use of Schools' initiative ==
The Community Use of Schools initiative is a way of making school facilities accessible to the public. Such facilities include classrooms, gymnasiums, auditoriums, and more. The rental fees can range from as little as $1.50 a night to as much as $125.00 per night, plus applicable staff. Quite often the staff will include janitors (if outside their regularly scheduled hours), but in some cases may included specialized staff for auditorium rentals. These staff are often specially trained students, but sometimes are outside professionals brought in by the host school to accommodate the renter's needs. Seminars, corporate events, dance recitals, and community theatre groups are the most common renters of the auditorium, whereas local sports tournaments are the most common renters of the gymnasiums.

Presentations that have occurred in these facilities include a presentation from Chris Hadfield, and amateur productions of musicals such as Les Misérables, Disney's Beauty and the Beast, Willy Wonka, Phantom of the Opera, and more.

== Social media ==
The Lambton Kent District School Board operates two social media accounts, one on Twitter and the other on Facebook.

== See also ==
- St. Clair Catholic District School Board
- List of school districts in Ontario
- List of high schools in Ontario
