= CKND-DT =

Television station in Winnipeg

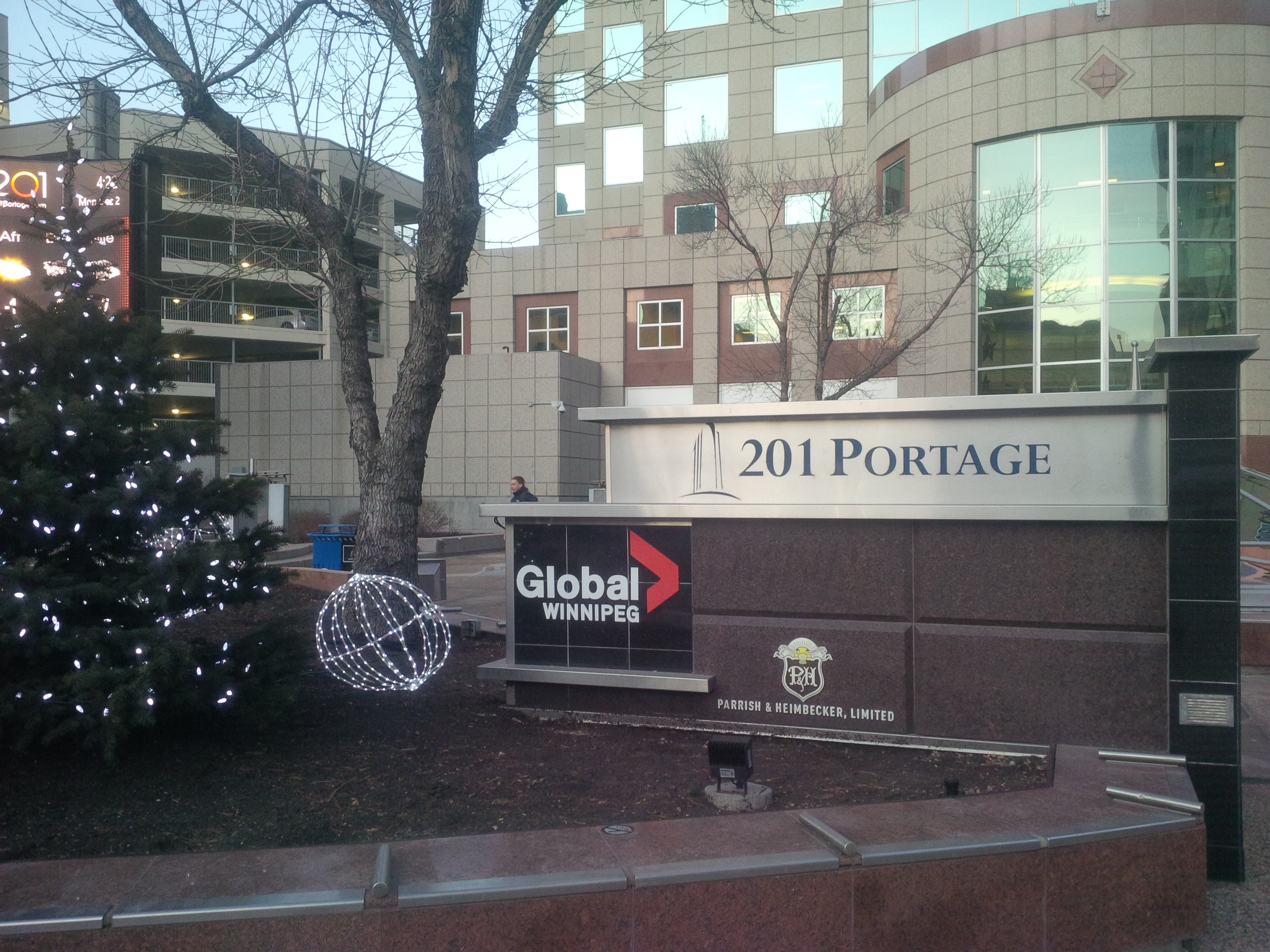
- Global Winnipeg's studios at 201 Portage in Downtown Winnipeg since September 1, 2008.
- Winnipeg, Manitoba; Canada
- Channels: Digital: 19 (UHF); Virtual: 9
- Branding: Global Winnipeg; Global News

Programming
- Affiliations: Global

Ownership
- Owner: Corus Entertainment; (Corus Television Limited Partnership)
- Sister stations: Radio: CFPG-FM, CJOB, CJKR-FM

History
- First air date: August 31, 1975
- Former call signs: CKND-TV (1975–2011)
- Former channel numbers: Analog: 9 (VHF, 1975–2011); Digital: 40 (UHF, 2010–2020)
- Former affiliations: Independent (1975–1997)
- Call sign meaning: anagram of KCND; Canada–North Dakota

Technical information
- Licensing authority: CRTC
- ERP: CKND-DT: 15.75 kW; CKND-DT-2: 30.5 kW
- HAAT: CKND-DT: 129 m (423 ft); CKND-DT-2: 374 m (1,227 ft)
- Transmitter coordinates: CKND-DT: 49°53′44″N 97°08′22″W; CKND-DT-2: 50°17′0″N 100°6′39″W
- Translator(s): CKND-DT-2 2.1 (9 VHF) Minnedosa

Links
- Website: Global Winnipeg

CKND-DT (channel 9) is a television station in Winnipeg, Manitoba, Canada, owned and operated by the Global Television Network, a division of Corus Entertainment. The station's studios are located on the 30th floor of 201 Portage in downtown Winnipeg, with transmitter atop the building.

== History ==
=== Acquisition and licensing ===
CKND's predecessor, KCND-TV, began broadcasting from Pembina, North Dakota, in November 1960. Although a U.S. station, it depended almost entirely on advertising from the media market of Winnipeg, Manitoba, Canada. In February 1973, the Canadian Radio-television and Telecommunications Commission (CRTC) announced that it had received two applications for new television stations in Winnipeg. One had been submitted by Western Manitoba Broadcasters Ltd., the parent company of CKX-TV in Brandon, Manitoba. The other application had been received from Continental Communications Ltd. of Vancouver, British Columbia, represented by Ray Peters, the president of Vancouver CTV affiliate CHAN-TV.

The CRTC solicited competing applications for the new Winnipeg television licence, and Peter Liba, who was then the executive assistant to Manitoba Liberal Party leader Izzy Asper, suggested that they make a bid. Wanting to save money on buying the needed equipment, Asper negotiated with Gordon McLendon to acquire the assets of KCND, convincing him that a new Winnipeg station would cut into KCND's revenues and that Winnipeg advertisers would likely lose tax deductions for American advertising costs.

McLendon sold the station's facilities and equipment to CanWest Broadcasting, established by Asper and partners Paul Morton and Seymour Epstein, for $780,000, contingent on CanWest securing a broadcasting licence. At the CRTC's public hearings in Winnipeg in May 1974, CanWest noted that the acquisition of KCND would give their new Winnipeg station a $2 million advertising base and would save $1.5 million in capital and start-up costs compared to the alternative of launching a completely new station.

At the same hearing, competing applications were presented by Western Manitoba Broadcasters Ltd. and by Communications Winnipeg Co-Op, which proposed a member-supported non-commercial station. (Continental Communications had withdrawn its application prior to the hearings.) John Boler, the owner of Valley City–Fargo, North Dakota, CBS affiliate KXJB-TV and future owner of KVRR/KNRR, also used the occasion to announce his intention to launch a new Pembina-based station on channel 12.

In September 1974, the CRTC awarded the Winnipeg channel 9 licence to CanWest, which formally took possession and assumed day-to-day management of KCND-TV on March 31, 1975 (due to foreign ownership restrictions, the McLendon Corporation remained the official licensee of KCND until it surrendered the station's broadcasting licence to the U.S. Federal Communications Commission [FCC] later that year). The same month, CanWest confirmed that the new station would operate from a former supermarket at 603 St. Mary's Road in Winnipeg and use an antenna mounted on the CBWT tower in Starbuck, Manitoba, to avoid having to dismantle KCND's tower during the transition. KCND-TV general manager G. O. Johnson was appointed executive vice-president and general manager of CanWest Broadcasting. In May 1975, CanWest announced that KCND's 17 Winnipeg-based employees had all accepted offers of employment at the new station, but that there was little interest among the station's 22 Pembina-based employees.

=== Broadcasting ===
During Labour Day weekend, on August 31, 1975, CKND signed on channel 9 (broadcast) and channel 12 (cable), both shown prominently in the station's logo. Both CKND and KCND simulcast the Jerry Lewis MDA Telethon until 5:30 p.m. on September 1, 1975, after which KCND permanently left the air.

The former KCND tower was later moved to Asper's birthplace of Minnedosa, Manitoba, a small town 46 kilometres (29 mi) north of Brandon, to serve western Manitoba. Together, the two transmitters reach 91% of Manitoba's population. Its first regularly scheduled program following the MDA telethon was The Hollywood Squares.

In 1981, KCND became the call letters for KCND-FM, the first Prairie Public Radio station in Bismarck, North Dakota. The same year, the U.S. FCC issued a construction permit for a new station to serve Pembina, North Dakota on channel 12. The station's launch, however, would remain delayed until 1986.

During a June 1981 hearing to extend CKND-TV's signal into the Westman area and to hear the application by Western Manitoba Broadcasters Ltd. (Craig) for a new television station at Portage la Prairie, CanWest said that the Westman transmitter on a VHF channel would reach up to 175,000 more viewers than with the CKND-TV Winnipeg signal. The signal would stretch from the U.S. border to Dauphin, and from Central Manitoba to Saskatchewan.

CKND logo c. 1975–1994

At an April 1982 CRTC hearing regarding licensing a new television station for southern Manitoba, CanWest stated that while they were given VHF channel 2 to operate the CKND-TV-2 rebroadcaster, they could have used VHF channel 13 instead. CanWest also stated that it would require a population of over 100,000 to serve the Interlake area with two or three UHF transmitters, rather than the 30,000 that existed at the time.

On-air signal testing on channel 2 with colour bars, test slides and test programming began in early August. CKND-TV-2 began broadcasting at 6 p.m. on September 1, 1982. Cable TV viewers in Dauphin were unable to watch the launch of CKND-TV-2 channel 2 because the cable company, Westman Media Co-op, did not have an antenna ready to receive the new signal.

In the mid-1980s, the station supported the development of a Manitoba film industry by funding television films, most notably The Prodigal and Tramp at the Door. Faced with the dilemma that the films would typically need to be sold to the national CBC or CTV networks to attain profitability, but the station would have to accept a reduced price if the films had already aired in prime time in a major Canadian television market, station manager Stan Thomas would air the films on CKND in an obscure overnight timeslot so that they would be eligible for ACTRA Award consideration, while still having been essentially unseen by an actual television audience so that he could secure the maximum price from a network.

The last logo used by CKND before adopting the Global brand

On January 1, 1986, channel 12 returned in Pembina, North Dakota, as KNRR, a satellite of independent station KVRR (channel 15) in Fargo. Canadian cable providers were prohibited from distributing the signal, however, by an October 1986 CRTC decision in response to broadcaster concerns about the "potentially damaging effect of this station by providing Canadian advertisers with access to large amounts of commercial airtime at rates substantially lower than those they would be obliged to pay Canadian television licensees in order to reach the same potential audience". As the satellite station was never profitable due to its location, as well as its difficulties in being able to reach the Winnipeg audience, KNRR went off the air from June to October 2009 as the station did not upgrade to a digital signal.

The first logo used as Global Manitoba

Along with the other CanWest-owned stations, CKND was rebranded as Global in August 1997. CKND's studios also produced Fox Soccer Report, which aired throughout the world on Fox Sports World Canada, Fox Soccer Channel, and Fox Sports Middle East. On September 1, 2008, CKND moved its operations to downtown Winnipeg at CanWest Place (now called 201 Portage).

On April 1, 2016, Shaw Media (which was rebranded from CanWest in 2010) was sold to Corus Entertainment. The deal provided CKND three radio stations (CJOB, CFPG-FM and CJKR-FM) as sister properties.

== News operation ==
CKND-DT presently broadcasts 24 1/2 hours of locally produced newscasts each week (4 1/2 hours each weekday and one hour each on Saturdays and Sundays). On November 14, 2009, the station introduced a weekend evening 10 p.m. newscast. In December 2009, longtime anchor Eva Kovacs announced that she would be leaving CKND after nearly twelve years with the station, to work for the Winnipeg Regional Health Authority in 2010. Shannon Martin was named as her replacement. Her departure came only a few months after lead weather anchor Andrea Slobodian and reporter Meera Bahadoosingh left for Shaw TV Calgary and Winnipeg respectively, and nightwatch anchor Trina Maus left for CKVR-TV in Barrie, Ontario.

The spring and summer of 2011 brought a few high-profile departures to the station; first weekend anchor and reporter Nicole Dube left to become the Manitoba correspondent for Sun News Network. Dube's replacement, Lindsay Warner, left the station to become the late night anchor at CKY-DT, lead weather anchor Craig Larkins left for CFRN-DT Edmonton in July, and in late August it was announced that senior anchor Shannon Martin would also be leaving to pursue her career in Ontario. Her last broadcast was September 2, 2011. That same month, it was announced that Kate Gajdosik would be the new weather/community anchor, joining the station from CIVT-DT Vancouver in September 2011.

On September 7, 2011, it was announced that Shaw Media would be continuing its expansion of political programming and Global News would be launching provincial half-hour political programs in several markets. Similar in format to Global Toronto's Focus Ontario and Global Montreal's Focus Montreal, these new political programs launched in Saskatchewan on CFRE-DT and CFSK-DT, as well as CKND, on October 15, 2011. In late 2011, Global Winnipeg became the first television station in Manitoba to broadcast its local news in high definition.

On February 6, 2012, CKND launched a three-hour weekday morning newscast, airing from 6 to 9 a.m. Around the same time, CKND became the first Winnipeg station to acquire a news helicopter, Skyview 1. The vehicle was grounded in summer 2017. On August 20, 2012, CKND expanded its half-hour 10 p.m. newscast to one hour, which was re-titled from Prime News to News Hour Final, cancelling their 30-minute 11 p.m. newscast, News Final.

Global Winnipeg's supper-time newscast ranked third in the Winnipeg TV market. As of spring 2016, Global News at 6 averaged 31,800 viewers (a drop from 32,500 in fall 2015) to CTV Winnipeg's 103,900 and CBC Winnipeg's 39,800. As of fall 2015, Global's late-night News Hour Final, ranks first with 17,200 viewers to CTV Winnipeg's 15,200, a significant drop from Global Winnipeg's 27,400 viewers in fall 2014.

On April 1, 2016, CKND-DT was sold to Corus Entertainment, and earned three radio stations for sister networks.

Starting April 11, 2016, Global Winnipeg, along with all Global owned-and-operated stations, rebranded its news programs. All of their news programs received new names: Global News Morning, Global News at 6, and Global News at 10.

On July 27, 2018, longtime Global Winnipeg personality and anchor of Global News at 6 Lauren McNabb left the station to go to sister radio station Global News Radio 680 CJOB, to co-host their morning show. She was replaced by Heather Steele, who had been co-anchor of Global News at 6 before her maternity leave in 2017.

On April 13, 2019, Kovacs announced on Facebook that she would be departing the station for the second time. Before becoming the station's community producer, she anchored Global News Morning (then Morning News) from 2012 to 2015. Global News at 6 anchor Heather Steele announced on May 15, 2019, that she would be departing the station for a new role at sister station CJOB. Steele officially departed Global Winnipeg on July 12, 2019. On July 25, 2019, Global Winnipeg announced that Steele's replacement would be Lisa Dutton, former anchor of Global News Morning at Global Saskatoon. Dutton officially started on July 30, 2019.

=== Notable former on-air staff ===
- Dawna Friesen – news anchor
- Don Marks – news anchor
- Daren Millard – Sportsline anchor
- Gene Principe – Sportsline anchor
- Jeremy St. Louis – weather
- Diana Swain – news anchor
- Cory Woron – Sportsline anchor

== Technical information ==
=== Subchannel ===
Subchannel of CKND-DT
| Subchannel | Res. | Short name | Programming |
|---|---|---|---|
| 9.1 | 1080i | CKND | Global |

=== Analog-to-digital conversion ===
On December 16, 2010, CKND-TV commenced broadcasting of its digital signal on channel 40 from CanWest Place (now 201 Portage). The station shut down its analog signal on August 28, 2011. Its digital signal remained on UHF channel 40 until 2020, when it moved to UHF channel 19, using virtual channel 9.
