= CITI-FM =

Radio station in Winnipeg, Manitoba

Coordinates: 49°45′20″N 97°07′53″W

- Winnipeg, Manitoba; Canada
- Broadcast area: Winnipeg Metropolitan Region
- Frequency: 92.1 MHz
- Branding: 92.1 CITI

Programming
- Format: Mainstream rock

Ownership
- Owner: Rogers Radio; (Rogers Media, Inc.)
- Sister stations: CKY-FM, CHMI-DT

History
- First air date: 1962
- Former call signs: CKY-FM (1962–1978)
- Call sign meaning: derived from the word "city"

Technical information
- Licensing authority: CRTC
- Class: C
- ERP: 100,000 watts average 140,000 watts peak
- HAAT: 206.1 metres (676 ft)

Links
- Webcast: Listen Live
- Website: 921citi.ca

CITI-FM (92.1 MHz) is a commercial radio station broadcasting in Winnipeg, Manitoba, Canada. Owned by Rogers Radio, a division of Rogers Sports & Media, the station broadcasts a mainstream rock format branded as 92.1 CITI. Its studios are located on Osborne Street south of Downtown Winnipeg, while its transmitter is located at Duff Roblin Provincial Park just south of Winnipeg.

== History ==
The station first signed on in 1962 as CKY-FM simulcasting AM 580 CKY broadcasting at 360,000 watts, making it the most powerful FM radio station in North America. The station adopted its current call sign, CITI-FM, on April 1, 1978, The first song played on CITI was Deep Purple's "Highway Star".

In the early 1990s, the station was acquired by Rogers Radio, who converted CITI's sister AM station CKY to the FM band in 2004, and retained the CKY call sign on that station. That station now plays a hot AC format.

CKY-FM was originally North America's most powerful commercial FM station. (That distinction currently belongs to WBCT in Grand Rapids, Michigan. Canada's most powerful FM station is CJKR-FM, also in Winnipeg.) In 2003 CITI-FM was granted a decrease in effective radiated power from 210,000 to 100,000 watts. Its transmitter was then relocated 20 kilometers north of its former site.

Some notable announcers through the years at CITI are: Ross Porter (Murray), Brother Jake Edwards, Terry Klassen, Terry Dimonte, Andy Frost, Howard Mandshein, Craig Thullner, Tim "Trucker" Bradley, Gordo Fry, Lamont Hollywood, Shadoe Davis, Tom McGouran, Alix Michaels, Larry Updike, Joe Aiello, Harry Callaghan, Brian Cook, Duncan MacPhail and Cosmo.

On May 17, 2012, the station rebranded itself as "World Class Rock" and began playing more 1980s, ’90s and 2000s-based rock.

On September 13, 2012, CITI announced that longtime morning show hosts Tom McGouran and Joe Aiello had been let go, and would be replaced with Dave Wheeler, Phil Aubrey and Rena Jae, formerly of rival station CJKR-FM. The latter three, having comprised the morning show of Wheeler In The Morning with Philly and Rena since September 2009, were unable to come to terms on a new contract with Corus Radio.

On January 12, 2015, the station's morning show Wheeler in the Morning began to be simulcast by sister Citytv station CHMI-DT, replacing the cancelled Winnipeg version of Breakfast Television. The former Breakfast Television hosts Jenna Khan and Drew Kozub presented news and entertainment segments that were shown on television when CITI played music.

Logo used from 2016–2025

On July 6, 2016, the station rebranded as 92.1 CITI, using a new standardized branding used by most Rogers-owned rock stations.

In July 2018, Wheeler was fired by Rogers for having been involved in "multiple disciplinary incidents" on-air. His firing came in the wake of transphobic remarks Wheeler made during his morning show; during a segment, Wheeler discussed Scarlett Johansson having declined a starring role as gangster Dante "Tex" Gill in a biographical film based on his life, after criticism from the LGBT community over Gill—who was a trans man—being played by a cisgender woman. Wheeler compared being transgender to being an "actor" that "pretends" to be a "different thing", and also expressed similar sentiment over Facebook Messenger with a listener who discussed the issue further, stating that "If someone is born human. And they pretend to be a dog. It is not right to agree with them for the sake of their feelings". Multiple businesses pulled their advertising from the station in response to the comments.

After Wheeler's departure, co-hosts Jae and Dave Turnbull continued on the morning show along with former Winnipeg Blue Bomber Kelly Butler as a new addition.

TJ Connors, son of legendary radio host Scruff Connors, joined the show replacing Butler in 2018.

In 2021, Jae left CITI Mornings.
