= CKY-FM =

Radio station in Winnipeg, Canada

Coordinates: 49°52′36.3″N 97°08′36.5″W

- Winnipeg, Manitoba; Canada
- Broadcast area: Winnipeg Metropolitan Region
- Frequency: 102.3 MHz
- Branding: KiSS 102.3

Programming
- Format: Hot adult contemporary

Ownership
- Owner: Rogers Radio; (Rogers Media, Inc.)
- Sister stations: CITI-FM, CHMI-DT

History
- First air date: December 31, 1949
- Former call signs: CKY (1949–2004)
- Former frequencies: 1080 kHz (1950); 580 kHz (1950–2004)

Technical information
- Licensing authority: CRTC
- Class: C1
- ERP: 70,000 watts; 100,000 watts (peak)
- HAAT: 206.1 metres (676 ft)

Links
- Webcast: Listen live
- Website: kiss1023.ca

CKY-FM (102.3 FM) is a commercial radio station in Winnipeg, Manitoba, Canada, branded as "KiSS 102.3". Owned by Rogers Radio, a division of Rogers Sports & Media, the station airs a hot adult contemporary format, with studios in Osborne Village south of Downtown Winnipeg.

CKY-FM's transmitter is sited off St. Mary's Road in Duff Roblin Provincial Park near Saint Germain.

== History ==
=== CKY and CNRW ===
CKY has been the call sign of three radio stations in Winnipeg. The original CKY was formed in 1923 by the Government of Manitoba and operated by the Manitoba Telephone System.

The provincial government ran the station, and in the station's early years, CKY would turn over its signal to the Canadian National Railway and the station would be identified as CNRW. When the federal government took over operations of the CNR radio network in the 1930s, CKY continued its relationship with the network, meaning that much of CKY's programming originated with the CRBC (which later became the CBC). In June 1948, the original CKY was purchased by the CBC and renamed CBW.

=== 580 AM ===
Lloyd Moffat resurrected the CKY call letters to begin the second incarnation of CKY. On December 31, 1949 (New Year's Eve), it began broadcasting on 580 AM. The station featured a Top 40 format in the 1960s and 70s, shifting to an oldies format in the 1980s. In the mid-1990s, the station added nighttime sports programming to its schedule, including Toronto Blue Jays baseball. To service former Winnipeg Jets fans who wanted to follow the team after its relocation in 1996, it also aired Phoenix Coyotes hockey. In 1963, Moffat also established the first CKY-FM, on 92.1 MHz, which for a period of time was the most powerful radio station in North America at 360,000 watts. In 1978, CKY-FM was re-branded as CITI-FM.

A 1980 article in the Winnipeg Free Press said that both CFRW and CKY wanted to broadcast in AM stereo, and that CKY chose the failed Kahn-Hazeltine system.

In 1992, Moffat Communications sold its radio division, including CKY and CITI, to Rogers Communications. In 1994, Rogers applied to the CRTC for permission to switch CKY to broadcast on FM, due to the declining number of people listening to AM stations and the anticipated lower revenues. However, due to the success of CKY's "Don Percy and Friends" morning show, which featured numerous "info chats" from businesses, the existing AM station managed to make a considerable profit. As a result, Rogers held off the FM conversion until 2004.

=== CKY-FM 102.3 ===
On January 21, 2004, Rogers moved CKY to 102.3 FM, with an ERP of 70,000 watts (100,000 watts peak). The 580 frequency went silent in Winnipeg, although community broadcasters have attempted to revive the station as 580 CJML. The new CKY-FM aired a soft adult contemporary format with the on-air brand name 102.3 Clear FM. This restored the adult contemporary format to Winnipeg after it was lost with the flip of 99.9 CFWM-FM to adult hits in 2002.

A new logo for CKY-FM was unveiled in late June 2011. The station moved in a more rhythmic direction (like sister CHFM-FM Calgary), but was still reporting as an adult contemporary outlet per Mediabase and Nielsen BDS.

On February 13, 2015, the station stepped up the tempo and became a Hot AC outlet, re-branded as 102.3 KiSS FM, without any change in personnel. The re-branding aligned CKY-FM with other "Kiss"-branded Hot AC stations operated by Rogers.

In 2020, CKY-FM changed its moniker to "Today's Best Music, The New KiSS 102.3", but kept the same Hot AC format. In morning drive time, CKY-FM began carrying the Roz and Mocha Show from CKIS-FM in Toronto, which also airs on other Rogers-owned "KiSS" stations across Canada.

== Former logos ==
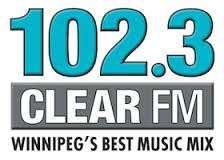
