= CKY-DT =

Television station in Winnipeg

- Winnipeg, Manitoba; Canada
- Channels: Digital: 7 (VHF); Virtual: 7
- Branding: CTV Winnipeg (general); CTV News Winnipeg (newscasts)

Programming
- Affiliations: 7.1: CTV

Ownership
- Owner: Bell Media Inc.
- Sister stations: CFWM-FM, CKMM-FM

History
- First air date: November 12, 1960
- Former call signs: CJAY-TV (1960–1973); CKY-TV (1973–2011)
- Former channel numbers: Analog: 7 (VHF, 1960–2011)
- Former affiliations: Independent (1960–1961)
- Call sign meaning: taken from its former sister radio station

Technical information
- Licensing authority: CRTC
- ERP: 24 kW
- HAAT: 280.8 m (921 ft)
- Transmitter coordinates: 49°34′48″N 97°10′3″W

Links
- Website: CTV Winnipeg

CKY-DT (channel 7) is a television station in Winnipeg, Manitoba, Canada, owned and operated by the CTV Television Network, a division of Bell Media. The station's studios are located on Graham Avenue (adjacent to the Canada Life Centre) in Downtown Winnipeg, with transmitter near Lord Selkirk Highway/Highway 75 in Ritchot.

== History ==
Beginning in 1954, Winnipeg had one television station, government-owned CBWT (channel 3). In January 1960, the Canadian Board of Broadcast Governors (BBG) held public hearings in Winnipeg in response to three applications which had been submitted to operate a commercial television station on channel 7. These applications were presented by R. S. Misener and Associates, a group associated with radio stations CKY–Winnipeg, CFAM–Altona and CKSB–St. Boniface; Perimeter Television Broadcasters Ltd., a group associated with Winnipeg radio station CJOB; and the Red River Television Association, a group associated with the Winnipeg Free Press newspaper and radio station CKRC.

In 1973, CKY used this logo and promotional campaign, after its call letters were changed from CJAY.

The Misener application was subsequently approved by the BBG, and the TV station was founded as independent station CJAY-TV on November 12, 1960. It joined the CTV Television Network when it launched on October 1, 1961.

On June 1, 1973, after Lloyd Moffat bought controlling interest in the station, its call sign was changed to CKY-TV to match Moffat's AM and FM stations, making it one of the only two Canadian television stations, the other being the now-defunct CKX-TV, with a three-letter call sign. (From 2007 to 2009, CKY-TV and CKX-TV were sister stations following CTVglobemedia's buyout of CHUM Limited.)

The CJAY call letters are now used on a Calgary rock station now owned by CTV's owner Bell Media. In 1992, Moffat sold CKY (AM) and CKY-FM (subsequently CITI-FM) to Rogers Media while maintaining ownership of the television station.

In the Fall of 1973, CKY-TV was using this logo and promotional campaign.

CKY's former logo (2001–2005). As of October 2005, logos with the stations' call signs are no longer used on CTV stations; instead they all use the main CTV logo.

In August 1992, general manager Vaughn Tozer hired Jim Wicks, a Canadian-American broadcaster, to be the main news anchor and managing editor. Tozer and Wicks reorganized the newsroom and the on-air team to help accomplish their goal. Within three ratings periods, the newscast had climbed from third place to first place, replacing CBWT's 24 Hours as the highest-rated newscast in Winnipeg. At one point, the newscast was advertised on billboards throughout the city as "Wicks at 6". The on-air chemistry between Wicks and sports director Steve Vogelsang added to the popularity of the program.

Although the personalities have since changed on several occasions, the station's newscast has remained Manitoba's highest-rated newscast. As of today, CKY-TV is the oldest private television station in Manitoba since CKX-TV's demise.

In 2001, Moffat Broadcasting was purchased by Shaw Cablesystems, which was not interested in CKY-TV or its co-owned cable channel, WTN. CKY-TV was purchased by Bell Globemedia, while WTN was purchased by Corus Entertainment, moving to Toronto, and becoming the W Network. Now a CTV owned-and-operated station, promos on CKY-TV became similar to the other CTV owned-and-operated stations. However, Shaw returned to the television station business five years later, acquiring CJBN-TV, a now defunct Global Television Network affiliate, in nearby Kenora, Ontario.

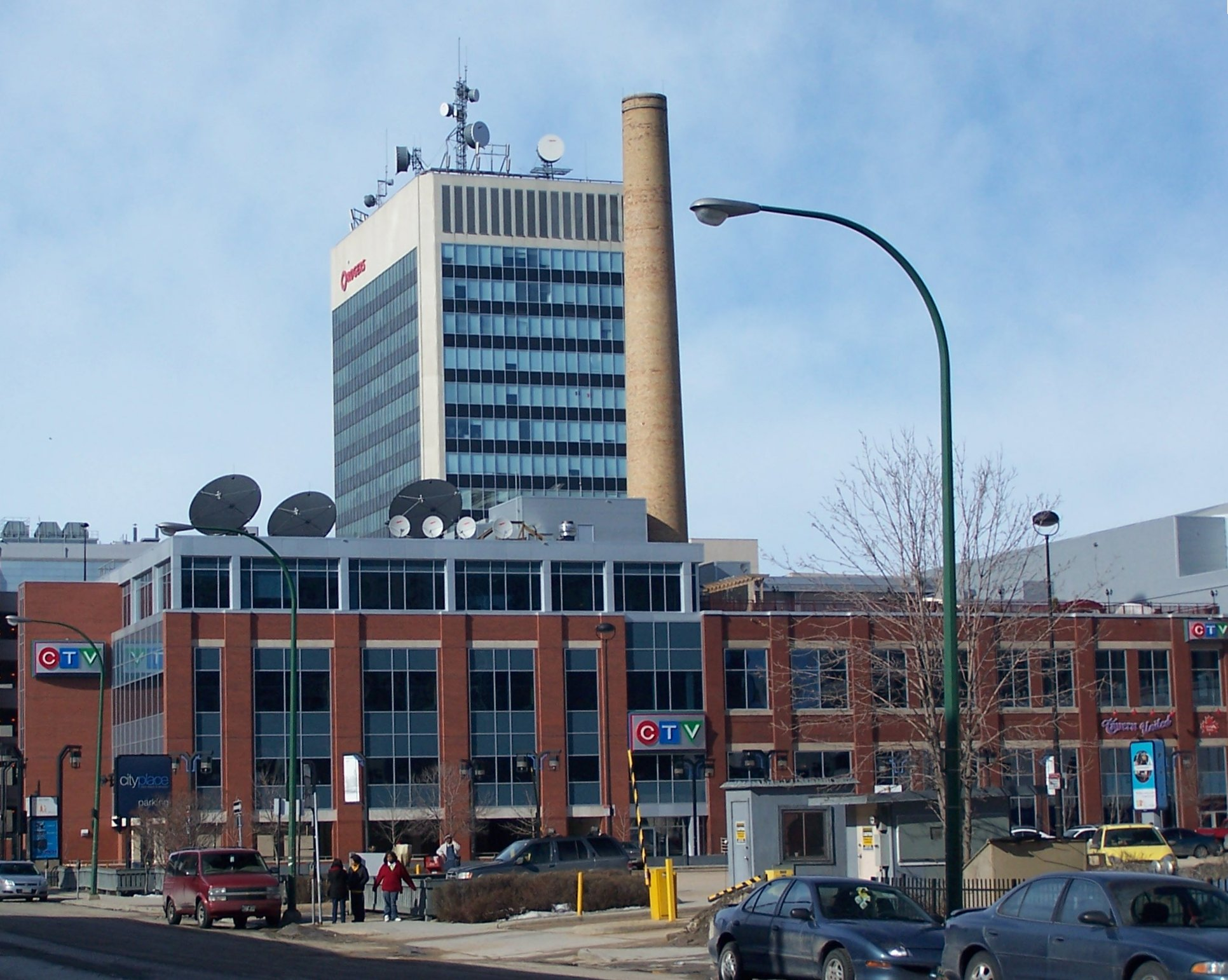
Current CKY-TV facilities in the renovated Powerhouse Building on Graham Avenue.

On May 15, 2006, the station's studios moved to a new facility near Winnipeg's Bell MTS Place. This move was prompted by economic development in the area, including the Polo Park Shopping Centre, and the likelihood that CKY-TV's studios would be bought off by developers to use the property for additional retail space. The demolition of Winnipeg Arena and the possible development of a new football stadium to replace Canad Inns Stadium would have likely placed the broadcasting facility in a position of being surrounded by retail developments.

CKY-TV's new studios use state-of-the-art technology, and little was moved from the old studios to the new facility. The existing news set was moved to CFQC, the CTV owned-and-operated station in Saskatoon, and some technical equipment was sent to CTV's Quebec City bureau. In addition, the master control of the station was moved to 9 Channel Nine Court, home of flagship CTV station CFTO-TV in Toronto.

Another likely reason for the move is that CKY-TV had more space than it needed. With WTN, CITI-FM and CKY-FM moving to new studios in recent years, plus the reduction of local, in-studio programming on CKY-TV since 1991, a new, although smaller, facility suited CKY-TV's needs. In recent years, CKY-TV has allowed studio space to be rented for third-party productions, including the locally produced film Blue State.

CKY-TV marked its 50th anniversary in 2010.

== Programming ==
=== Scheduling ===
As Manitoba is in the Central Time Zone, CKY-TV generally abides by the U.S. practice of airing prime time programming simultaneously with its counterparts in the Eastern Time Zone in order to maintain simultaneous substitution rights with the American network affiliates aired on cable in Winnipeg. However, there are still exceptions, such as local news airing from 6 to 7 p.m., and the CTV National News at 11 p.m. (whereas U.S. stations in the Central Time Zone typically air their late news at 10 p.m.). To accommodate both practices, programs that air in the 7 p.m. hour on most CTV stations, such as etalk and repeats of The Big Bang Theory, are generally moved to the 10 p.m. hour on CKY-TV. In November 2026, Manitoba began observing permanent daylight saving time. As Central Daylight Time (CDT, officially Manitoba Standard Time) matches Eastern Standard Time, CKY began to air its evening programming in-pattern with other CTV stations in the Eastern Time Zone when DST is not in effect.

Prior to CTV's purchase of the station in 2001, this shifting of prime time programming normally extended to the 7 ET/6 CT hour on Sundays, in line with the practice of American broadcast networks. This meant a local newscast would air at 5:30, followed by prime time, then an extra local newscast at 10 p.m. From 2001 to 2024, CKY-TV has usually aired local news at 6 p.m. seven nights a week, including Sundays, regardless of the station's ability to simsub at that hour, with programming rescheduled as needed to air within the 7–11 p.m. CT block.

=== News operation ===
CKY-DT presently broadcasts 25 hours of locally produced newscasts each week (with five hours each weekday). When CKY-TV launched as CJAY, its broadcast day ran from 5:30 p.m. until around midnight daily. Its local newscasts were originally broadcast from 7:15 to 7:30, and 10:30 to 10:55 p.m. each weeknight. The early newscast was part of a longer program known as Panorama 7, which ran from 5:30 to 7:30 p.m. and consisted of cartoons and other children's features, a weather report and news. As of October 3, 2005, the newscasts on CKY-TV are branded as CTV News.

On June 6, 2011, it was announced the longtime CKY-TV personality Sylvia Kuzyk would step down in the fall of 2011, and Colleen Bready was named her replacement. On July 26, 2011, it was announced that CKY-DT would debut a new three-hour weekday morning newscast called CTV Morning Live starting September 26, 2011, and would air from 6 to 9 a.m. from CKY-DT's studios, with the newscast anchored by Kris Laudien (formerly of Vancouver's CKVU-DT and Edmonton's CKEM-DT) and current CKY-DT reporter Eleanor Coopsammy.

==== Notable former on-air staff ====
- Ashleigh Banfield – researcher/reporter for the CKY evening news (1988–1989)
- Rod Black – sports anchor (former TSN and CTV sports announcer)
- Darren Dreger – sports anchor (current TSN hockey analyst)
- Janet Stewart – anchor (2001–2006)
- Jack Wells – sports anchor (?–1974)

== Technical information ==
=== Subchannel ===
Subchannel of CKY-DT
| Subchannel | Res. | Short name | Programming |
|---|---|---|---|
| 7.1 | 1080i | CKY | CTV |

=== Analog-to-digital conversion ===
At midnight on September 1, 2011, the day after Canadian television stations in CRTC-designated mandatory markets transitioned from analog to digital broadcasts, CKY-TV flash cut its digital signal into operation on VHF channel 7. The station's high definition feed is now offered on Bell Satellite TV via channel 1091 as of September 12, 2011.

=== Former transmitters ===
These transmitters are no longer operating as of January 29, 2025.

- CKYA-TV Fisher Branch
- CKYB-TV Brandon
- CKYB-TV-1 McCreary
- CKYD-TV Dauphin
- CKYF-TV Flin Flon (Note: These and a long list of CTV rebroadcasters nationwide were to shut down on or before August 31, 2009, as part of a political dispute with Canadian authorities on paid fee-for-carriage requirements for cable television operators. A subsequent change in ownership assigned full control of CTVglobemedia to Bell Canada; as of 2016, these transmitters remained in normal licensed broadcast operation.)
- CKYP-TV The Pas
- CKYS-TV Snow Lake
- CKYT-TV Thompson

Notes

On February 11, 2016, Bell Media applied for its regular license renewals, which included applications to delete a long list of transmitters, including CKYB-TV-1 and CKYS-TV. Bell Media's rationale for deleting these analog repeaters is below:

We are electing to delete these analog transmitters from the main licence with which they are associated. These analog transmitters generate no incremental revenue, attract little to no viewership given the growth of BDU or DTH subscriptions and are costly to maintain, repair or replace. In addition, none of the highlighted transmitters offer any programming that differs from the main channels. The Commission has determined that broadcasters may elect to shut down transmitters but will lose certain regulatory privileges (distribution on the basic service, the ability to request simultaneous substitution) as noted in Broadcasting Regulatory Policy CRTC 2015–24, Over-the-air transmission of television signals and local programming. We are fully aware of the loss of these regulatory privileges as a result of any transmitter shutdown.

At the same time, Bell Media applied to convert the licenses of CTV Two Atlantic (formerly ASN) and CTV Two Alberta (formerly ACCESS) from satellite-to-cable undertakings into television stations without transmitters (similar to cable-only network affiliates in the United States), and to reduce the level of educational content on CTV Two Alberta.

On July 30, 2019, Bell Media was granted permission to shut down four analog retransmitters by July 16, 2021, in the following locales: CKYA (Fisher Branch), CKYD (Dauphin), CKYF (Flin Flon), CKYP (The Pas).

On April 27, 2021, analog transmitter CKYT in Thompson was shut down, leaving the town with no access to over-the-air TV.

On January 29, 2025, Bell Media was granted permission to shut down analog transmitter CKYB in Brandon. The transmitter had already been off the air since 2024.
