= List of assets owned by Bell Media =

This is a list of assets currently owned by Bell Media, a subsidiary of BCE Inc.

This list does not enumerate the various telecommunications or retail assets owned by BCE. For further information on those properties, refer to the article on Bell Canada.

== Television operations ==
Bell Media owns and operates 30 English language and five French language local conventional television stations under the CTV, CTV2 and Noovo brands; 27 English language specialty channels, including Crave and TSN; and 12 French language specialty channels including Super Écran and RDS.

Bell Media's predecessors, including CTVglobemedia, previously held most of their television assets through a subsidiary, CTV Inc. (the former Baton Broadcasting Inc.). This entity was amalgamated with CTVglobemedia and other subsidiaries in early 2011, and briefly carried the "CTV Inc." name until being renamed Bell Media Inc. later that year. All of Bell Media's conventional television licences are currently held directly by Bell Media Inc.

=== Conventional television ===
- A lavender blue background indicates the flagship station of the respective network or television system.
- A blue background indicates a television station transmitting in analogue.

==== CTV (English) ====
CTV owned-and-operated stations
| Call sign | City of licence | TV | RF | Owned since |
|---|---|---|---|---|
| CFCN-DT | Calgary, AB | 4 | 29 | 1996 |
| CFRN-DT | Edmonton, AB | 3 | 12 | 1997 |
| CJCH-DT | Halifax, NS | 5 | 48 | 1971 |
| CKCO-DT | Kitchener, ON | 13 | 13 | 1997 |
| CKCW-DT | Moncton, NB | 29 | 29 | 1972 |
| CFCF-DT | Montreal, QC | 12 | 12 | 2001 |
| CKNY-TV | North Bay, ON | 10 | 12 | 1990 |
| CJOH-DT | Ottawa, ON | 13 | 13 | 1987 |
| CIPA-TV | Prince Albert, SK | 9 (analogue) | | 1987 |
| CKCK-DT | Regina, SK | 2 | 8 | 1985 |
| CKLT-DT | Saint John, NB | 9 | 9 | 1972 |
| CFQC-DT | Saskatoon, SK | 8 | 8 | 1972 |
| CHBX-TV | Sault Ste. Marie, ON | 2 (analogue) | | 1990 |
| CICI-TV | Sudbury, ON | 5 (analogue) | | 1990 |
| CJCB-TV | Sydney, NS | 4 | 25 | 1971 |
| CITO-TV | Timmins, ON | 3 (analogue) | | 1990 |
| CFTO-DT | Toronto, ON | 9 | 8 | 1960 |
| CIVT-DT | Vancouver, BC | 32 | 32 | 1997 |
| CKY-DT | Winnipeg, MB | 7 | 7 | 2001 |
| CICC-TV | Yorkton, SK | 10 (analogue) | | 1986 |

==== CTV 2 (English) ====
CTV 2 owned-and-operated stations
| Call sign | City/Province of licence | TV | RF | Owned since |
|---|---|---|---|---|
| CKVR-DT | Barrie, ON | 3 | 10 | 1969 |
| CJDC-TV | Dawson Creek, BC | 5 (analogue) | | 2013 (Note: Acquired from Astral Media.) |
| CFPL-DT | London, ON | 10 | 10 | 1992 |
| CHRO-DT-43 | Ottawa, ON | 43 | 7 | 1997 |
| CHRO-TV | Pembroke, ON | 5 (analogue) | | 1990 |
| CFTK-TV | Terrace, BC | 3 (analogue) | | 2013 |
| CIVI-DT | Victoria, BC | 23 | 23 | 2001 |
| CHWI-DT | Wheatley–Windsor, ON | 16 | 16 | 1993 |
| CTV 2 Alberta | Alberta | N/A | N/A | 2011 |
| CTV 2 Atlantic | Atlantic Canada | N/A | N/A | 2011 |

==== Noovo (French) ====
Noovo owned-and-operated stations
| Call sign | City of licence | TV | RF | Owned since |
|---|---|---|---|---|
| CFJP-DT | Montreal, QC | 35 | 35 | 2020 |
| CFAP-DT | Quebec City, QC | 2 | 39 | 2020 |
| CFRS-DT | Saguenay, QC | 4 | 13 | 2020 |
| CFKS-DT | Sherbrooke, QC | 30 | 30 | 2020 |
| CFKM-DT | Trois-Rivières, QC | 16 | 34 | 2020 |

=== English specialty channels ===
==== CTV Entertainment Channels ====
- CTV Comedy Channel
- CTV Drama Channel
- CTV Life Channel
- CTV Nature Channel
- CTV Sci-Fi Channel
- CTV Speed Channel
- CTV Wild Channel
- Much

==== News channels ====
- BNN Bloomberg (licensed by Bloomberg L.P.)
- CP24
- CTV News Channel

==== Licensed entertainment channels ====
- E! (licensed by Versant)
- Oxygen (licensed by Versant)
- USA Network (licensed by Versant)

==== Premium channels ====
- Crave
  - Crave 1
  - Crave 2
  - Crave 3
  - Crave 4
  - HBO 1 (licensed by Skydance Corporation)
  - HBO 2 (licensed by Skydance Corporation)
- Starz
  - Starz 1 (licensed by Starz)
  - Starz 2 (licensed by Starz)

==== Sports channels ====
- The Sports Network (TSN)
  - TSN1 (Co-owned/licensed by ESPN)
  - TSN2 (Co-owned/licensed by ESPN)
  - TSN3 (Co-owned/licensed by ESPN)
  - TSN4 (Co-owned/licensed by ESPN)
  - TSN5 (Co-owned/licensed by ESPN)

==== Pay per view ====
- Vu!
  - Red Carpet Vu!
- Venus

=== French specialty channels ===
==== Entertainment channels ====
- Canal D
- Canal Vie
- Investigation
- Z

==== Premium channels ====
- Cinépop
- Super Écran
  - Super Écran 1
  - Super Écran 2
  - Super Écran 3
  - Super Écran 4

==== Sports channels ====
- Réseau des sports (RDS)
  - RDS1 (Co-owned/licensed by ESPN)
  - RDS2 (Co-owned/licensed by ESPN)
  - RDS Info (Co-owned/licensed by ESPN)

=== CTV AVOD services ===
Digital-only offerings available exclusively on CTV digital platforms and Crave

- CTV Movies
- CTV Throwback

=== FAST channels ===
These channels are available via FAST platforms such as LG Channels, Samsung TV Plus, Tubi, and others. In November 2024, they also became accessible via Bell Fibe TV, and the Bell TV and Virgin Plus TV apps.

==== English ====
- Corner Gas Channel: Corner Gas and Corner Gas Animated
- CTV @Home: Lifestyle programming
- CTV Gets Real: Reality and unscripted programming
- CTV Gridlock: Highway Thru Hell and Heavy Rescue: 401
- CTV Laughs: Stand-up comedy and sitcoms
- CTV News
- The Mightiest by CTV: Devoted to USA Network (formerly Discovery Channel)'s The Mightiest franchise.
- TSN The Ocho: Unconventional sports and competitions

==== French ====
- Noovo cinéma
- Ça c’est drôle
- Les débatteurs Noovo

== Bell Media Radio ==
Bell Media Radio (branded as iHeartRadio Canada) is the wholly owned radio broadcasting division of Bell Media. Through iHeartRadio Canada, Bell Media also owns iHeartRadio Canada Sales and operates a localized version of the iHeartRadio online radio platform owned by iHeartMedia.

Bell Media owns the following radio network brands:

- Boom FM
- Bounce
- Énergie
- Funny
- Move Radio
- Pure Country
- Rouge FM
- TSN Radio
- Virgin Radio

=== Current stations ===
- An orange background indicates a French language format.
- (**) – Indicates station was built and signed on by Bell Media or a corporate antecedent (CHUM, Baton, CTVglobemedia).

| City of licence | Call sign | Frequency | Band | Branding | Format | Owned since |
|---|---|---|---|---|---|---|
| Brandon, MB | CKX-FM | 96.1 | FM | Bounce | Adult hits | 2013 |
| Brandon, MB | CKXA-FM | 101.1 | FM | Pure Country | Country music | 2013 |
| Calgary, AB | CIBK-FM | 98.5 | FM | Virgin Radio | Contemporary hits | 2013 |
| Calgary, AB | CJAY-FM | 92.1 | FM | CJAY 92 | Mainstream rock | 2013 |
| Edmonton, AB | CFBR-FM | 100.3 | FM | The Bear | Active rock | 2013 |
| Edmonton, AB | CFMG-FM | 104.9 | FM | Virgin Radio | Contemporary hits | 2013 |
| Fredericton, NB | CKHJ | 1260 | AM | Pure Country | Country music | 2013 |
| Fredericton, NB | CFXY-FM | 105.3 | FM | Bounce | Adult hits | 2013 |
| Fredericton, NB | CIBX-FM | 106.9 | FM | Move Radio | Adult contemporary | 2013 |
| Gatineau, QC | CIMF-FM | 94.9 | FM | Rouge FM | Adult contemporary | 2013 |
| Gatineau, QC | CKTF-FM | 104.1 | FM | Énergie | Contemporary hits | 2013 |
| Halifax, NS | CJCH-FM | 101.3 | FM | Virgin Radio | Contemporary hits | 1970 |
| Halifax, NS | CIOO-FM** | 100.1 | FM | Move Radio | Adult contemporary | 1977 |
| Kitchener, ON | CKKW-FM | 99.5 | FM | Bounce | Adult hits | 1993 |
| Kitchener, ON | CFCA-FM | 105.3 | FM | Virgin Radio | Contemporary hits | 1993 |
| London, ON | CIQM-FM | 97.5 | FM | Virgin Radio | Contemporary hits | 2013 |
| London, ON | CJBX-FM | 92.7 | FM | Pure Country | Country music | 2013 |
| Magog, QC | CIMO-FM | 106.1 | FM | Énergie | Contemporary hits | 2013 |
| Midland, ON | CICZ-FM | 104.1 | FM | Bounce | Adult hits | 2018 (Note: Acquired from Larche Communications.) |
| Montreal, QC | CKGM | 690 | AM | TSN Radio | Sports radio | 1985 |
| Montreal, QC | CJAD | 800 | AM | CJAD 800 | Talk radio | 2013 |
| Montreal, QC | CHOM-FM | 97.7 | FM | CHOM 977 | Mainstream rock | 2013 (Note: Also owned by CHUM Radio from 1985 to 2002.) |
| Montreal, QC | CJFM-FM | 95.9 | FM | Virgin Radio | Contemporary hits | 2013 |
| Montreal, QC | CKMF-FM | 94.3 | FM | Énergie | Contemporary hits | 2013 |
| Montreal, QC | CITE-FM | 107.3 | FM | Rouge FM | Adult contemporary | 2013 |
| Orillia, ON | CICX-FM | 105.9 | FM | Pure Country | Country music | 2018 |
| Ottawa, ON | CFRA | 580 | AM | 580 CFRA | Talk radio | 1968 |
| Ottawa, ON | CFGO | 1200 | AM | TSN Radio | Sports radio | 1999 |
| Ottawa, ON | CKKL-FM | 93.9 | FM | Pure Country | Country music | 1968 |
| Ottawa, ON | CJMJ-FM | 100.3 | FM | Move Radio | Adult contemporary | 1999 |
| Pembroke, ON | CHVR-FM | 96.7 | FM | Pure Country | Country music | 2013 |
| Quebec City, QC | CHIK-FM | 98.9 | FM | Énergie | Contemporary hits | 2013 |
| Quebec City, QC | CITF-FM | 107.5 | FM | Rouge FM | Adult contemporary | 2013 |
| Regina, SK | CHBD-FM | 92.7 | FM | Pure Country | Country music | 2013 |
| Rouyn-Noranda, QC | CJMM-FM | 99.1 | FM | Énergie | Contemporary hits | 2013 |
| Saguenay, QC | CFIX-FM | 96.9 | FM | Rouge FM | Adult contemporary | 2013 |
| Saguenay, QC | CJAB-FM | 94.5 | FM | Énergie | Contemporary hits | 2013 |
| Sherbrooke, QC | CITE-FM-1 | 102.7 | FM | Rouge FM | Adult contemporary | 2013 |
| Sudbury, ON | CICS-FM | 91.7 | FM | Pure Country | Country music | 2018 |
| Toronto, ON | CFRB | 1010 | AM | Newstalk 1010 | Talk radio | 2013 |
| Toronto, ON | CHUM** | 1050 | AM | TSN Radio | Sports radio | 1945 |
| Toronto, ON | CHUM-FM** | 104.5 | FM | CHUM 104.5 | Hot AC | 1963 |
| Toronto, ON | CKFM-FM | 99.9 | FM | Virgin Radio | Contemporary hits | 2013 |
| Trois-Rivières, QC | CHEY-FM | 94.7 | FM | Rouge FM | Adult contemporary | 2013 |
| Trois-Rivières, QC | CIGB-FM | 102.3 | FM | Énergie | Contemporary hits | 2013 |
| Val-d'Or, QC | CJMV-FM | 102.7 | FM | Énergie | Contemporary hits | 2013 |
| Vancouver, BC | CFBT-FM | 94.5 | FM | Virgin Radio | Contemporary hits | 2007 |
| Vancouver, BC | CHQM-FM | 103.5 | FM | Move Radio | Adult contemporary | 1990 |
| Victoria, BC | CFAX | 1070 | AM | CFAX 1070 | Talk radio | 2004 |
| Victoria, BC | CHBE-FM | 107.3 | FM | Virgin Radio | Contemporary hits | 2004 |
| Windsor, ON | CKLW | 800 | AM | AM 800 | Talk radio | 1993 (Note: Also owned by Baton from 1970 to 1985.) |
| Windsor, ON | CIDR-FM | 93.9 | FM | Virgin Radio | Contemporary hits | 1993 |
| Windsor, ON | CIMX-FM | 88.7 | FM | 89X | Alternative rock | 1985 |
| Winnipeg, MB | CFWM-FM | 99.9 | FM | Bounce | Adult hits | 2001 |
| Winnipeg, MB | CKMM-FM | 103.1 | FM | Virgin Radio | Contemporary hits | 2013 |

=== Former stations ===
| City of licence | Call sign | Frequency | Band | Years owned | Fate |
|---|---|---|---|---|---|
| Amqui, QC | CFVM-FM | 99.9 | FM | 2013–2025 | Sold to Arsenal Media in 2024, CRTC approved sale in 2025 |
| Bathurst, NB | CKBC-FM | 104.9 | FM | 2013–2024 | Sold to Maritime Broadcasting System in 2024 |
| Brockville, ON | CJPT-FM | 103.7 | FM | 1996–2025 | Sold to My Broadcasting Corporation in 2024, CRTC approved sale in 2025 |
| Brockville, ON | CFJR-FM | 104.9 | FM | 1997–2025 | Sold to My Broadcasting Corporation in 2024, CRTC approved sale in 2025 |
| Calgary, AB | CKMX | 1060 | AM | 2013–2023 | Defunct, ceased operations in 2023 |
| Calgary, AB | CFVP | 6.03 | SW | 2013-2023 | Defunct shortwave relay of CKMX |
| Dawson Creek, BC | CJDC | 890 | AM | 2013–2024 | Sold to Vista Radio in 2024, sale approved by CRTC in 2025 |
| Drummondville, QC | CHRD-FM | 105.3 | FM | 2013–2025 | Sold to Arsenal Media in 2024, CRTC approved sale in 2025l |
| Drummondville, QC | CJDM-FM | 92.1 | FM | 2013–2025 | Sold to Arsenal Media in 2024, CRTC approved sale in 2025 |
| Edmonton, AB | CFRN | 1260 | AM | 2013–2023 | Defunct, ceased operations in 2023 |
| Edmonton, AB | CHBN-FM | 91.7 | FM | 2005–2010 | Sold to Rogers Sports & Media in 2010 |
| Fort Nelson, BC | CKRX-FM | 102.3 | FM | 2013–2025 | Sold to Vista Radio in 2024, sale approved by CRTC in 2025 |
| Fort St. John, BC | CHRX-FM | 98.5 | FM | 2013–2025 | Sold to Vista Radio in 2024, sale approved by CRTC in 2025 |
| Fort St. John, BC | CKNL-FM | 101.5 | FM | 2013–2024 | Sold to Vista Radio in 2024, sale approved by CRTC in 2025 |
| Golden, BC | CKGR-FM | 106.3 | FM | 2013–2025 | Sold to Vista Radio in 2024, sale approved by CRTC in 2025 |
| Grand Falls, NB | CIKX-FM | 93.5 | FM | 2013-2024 | Sold to Maritime Broadcasting System in 2024 |
| Hamilton, ON | CHAM | 820 | AM | 2013–2024 | Sold to CINA Radio Group in 2023, CRTC approved sale in 2024 |
| Hamilton, ON | CKOC | 1150 | AM | 2013–2024 | Sold to CINA Radio Group in 2023, CRTC approved sale in 2024 |
| Hamilton, ON | CKLH-FM | 102.9 | FM | 2007–2025 | Sold to Whiteoaks Communications Group in 2024. |
| Kawartha Lakes, ON | CKLY-FM | 91.9 | FM | 2000–2025 | Sold to Durham Radio in 2025. |
| Kelowna, BC | CKFR | 1150 | AM | 2013–2025 | Sold to Vista Radio in 2024, sale approved by CRTC in 2025 |
| Kelowna, BC | CHSU-FM | 99.9 | FM | 2013–2025 | Sold to Vista Radio in 2024, sale approved by CRTC in 2025 |
| Kelowna, BC | CILK-FM | 101.5 | FM | 2013–2025 | Sold to Vista Radio in 2024, sale approved by CRTC in 2025 |
| Kingston, ON | CFLY-FM | 98.3 | FM | 1997–2025 | Sold to My Broadcasting Corporation in 2024, CRTC approved sale in 2025 |
| Kingston, ON | CKLC-FM | 98.9 | FM | 1997–2025 | Sold to My Broadcasting Corporation in 2024, CRTC approved sale in 2025 |
| Kitimat, BC | CKTK-FM | 97.7 | FM | 2013–2025 | Sold to Vista Radio in 2024, sale approved by CRTC in 2025 |
| London, ON | CKSL | 1410 | AM | 2013–2016 | Defunct, ceased operations in 2016 |
| London, ON | CJBK | 1290 | AM | 2013–2023 | Defunct, ceased operations in 2023 |
| London, ON | CHST-FM | 102.3 | FM | 2000–2010 | Sold to Rogers Sports & Media in 2010 |
| Nelson, BC | CKKC-FM | 106.9 | FM | 2013–2025 | Sold to Vista Radio in 2024, sale approved by CRTC in 2025 |
| Osoyoos, BC | CJOR | 1240 | AM | 2007–2025 | Sold to Vista Radio in 2024, sale approved by CRTC in 2025 |
| Owen Sound, ON | CJOS-FM | 92.3 | FM | 2018–2024 | Sold to ZoomerMedia in 2024 |
| Penticton, BC | CKOR | 800 | AM | 2013–2025 | Sold to Vista Radio in 2024, sale approved by CRTC in 2025 |
| Penticton, BC | CJMG-FM | 97.1 | FM | 2013–2025 | Sold to Vista Radio in 2024, sale approved by CRTC in 2025 |
| Peterborough, ON | CKPT-FM | 99.7 | FM | 1977–2024 | Sold to Durham Radio in 2025 |
| Peterborough, ON | CKQM-FM | 105.1 | FM | 1977–2024 | Sold to Durham Radio in 2025 |
| Prince Rupert, BC | CHTK-FM | 99.1 | FM | 2013–2025 | Sold to Vista Radio in 2024, sale approved by CRTC in 2025 |
| Revelstoke, BC | CKCR-FM | 106.1 | FM | 2013–2025 | Sold to Vista Radio in 2024, sale approved by CRTC in 2025 |
| Rimouski, QC | CIKI-FM | 98.7 | FM | 2013–2025 | Sold to Arsenal Media in 2024, CRTC approved sale in 2025 |
| Rimouski, QC | CJOI-FM | 102.9 | FM | 2013–2025 | Sold to Arsenal Media in 2024, CRTC approved sale in 2025 |
| Saint-Hyacinthe, QC | CFEI-FM | 106.5 | FM | 2013–2025 | Sold to Arsenal Media in 2024, CRTC approved sale in 2025 |
| Saint-Jean-sur-Richelieu, QC | CFZZ-FM | 104.1 | FM | 2013–2025 | Sold to Arsenal Media in 2024, CRTC approved sale in 2025 |
| St. Catharines, ON | CKTB | 610 | AM | 2013–2024 | Sold to Whiteoaks Communications Group in 2024 |
| St. Catharines, ON | CHRE-FM | 105.7 | FM | 2013–2024 | Sold to Whiteoaks Communications Group in 2024 |
| St. Catharines, ON | CHTZ-FM | 97.7 | FM | 2013–2024 | Sold to Whiteoaks Communications Group in 2024 |
| Salmon Arm, BC | CKXR-FM | 91.5 | FM | 2013–2025 | Sold to Vista Radio in 2024, sale approved by CRTC in 2025 |
| Summerland, BC | CHOR-FM | 98.5 | FM | 2013–2025 | Sold to Vista Radio in 2024, sale approved by CRTC in 2025 |
| Terrace, BC | CFTK | 590 | AM | 2013–2025 | Sold to Vista Radio in 2024, sale approved by CRTC in 2025 |
| Terrace, BC | CJFW-FM | 103.1 | FM | 2013–2024 | Sold to Vista Radio in 2024, sale approved by CRTC in 2025 |
| Toronto, ON | CFXJ-FM | 93.5 | FM | 2010–2013 | Sold to Stingray Radio in 2013 |
| Trail, BC | CJAT-FM | 95.7 | FM | 2013–2025 | Sold to Vista Radio in 2024, sale approved by CRTC in 2025 |
| Truro, NS | CKTO-FM | 100.9 | FM | 2013-2024 | Sold to Maritime Broadcasting System in 2024 |
| Truro, NS | CKTY-FM | 99.5 | FM | 2013-2024 | Sold to Maritime Broadcasting System in 2024 |
| Vancouver, BC | CKST | 1040 | AM | 1992–2023 | Defunct, ceased operations in 2023 |
| Vancouver, BC | CFTE | 1410 | AM | 1973–2023 | Defunct, ceased operations in 2023 |
| Vernon, BC | CICF-FM | 105.7 | FM | 2013–2025 | Sold to Vista Radio in 2024, sale approved by CRTC in 2025 |
| Windsor, ON | CKWW | 580 | AM | 1985–2024 | Sold to CINA Radio Group in 2023, CRTC approved the sale in 2024 |
| Winnipeg, MB | CFRW | 1290 | AM | 1974–2023 | Sold to Akash Broadcasting in 2025 |
| Woodstock, NB | CJCJ-FM | 104.1 | FM | 2013-2024 | Sold to Maritime Broadcasting System in 2024 |

== Other assets ==
=== Streaming and Music ===
- Crave — TV Everywhere video-streaming service
- CTV Music — music publishing

=== Production Studios ===
- Agincourt Productions Inc. — Bell Media's in-house production company
- Bell Media Original Production — division used to produce original programming for Bell Media-owned networks
- Much Digital Studios — a multi-channel network
- Dome Productions (owned by Bell Media and Rogers Media Inc.) — a multi-platform production company that operates a fleet of 18 television production mobiles, one production/uplink truck, and three KU uplink tractors. The company is headquartered at 130 Merton Street.
- Bell Media produces live theatrical shows via its partnership with Iconic Entertainment Studios
- Pinewood Toronto Studios — a domestic and international film and television studio. Recent productions at the studio include It: Chapter Two, The Christmas Chronicles, A Simple Favor, Molly’s Game, The Expanse, and Star Trek: Discovery.

=== Advertising ===
- Environics Analytics. An advertising company owned by Bell Media, not to be confused with the Environics Group of Companies.
- Astral Out-of-Home — an out-of-home advertising company, a division of Bell Media, located in the markets of British Columbia, Alberta, Ontario, Québec, and Nova Scotia.

=== Other ===
- Autohound (unknown equity interest)
- Noovo Moi
- Megawheels Technologies Inc. (4%)
- Sphere-Abacus. Sphere is a distributor of content.
- Bell Media also operates more than 200 websites

== See also ==
- Lists of corporate assets
