= Bell Media Radio =

Canadian radio broadcaster

Bell Media Radio, G.P.
- Trade name: iHeartRadio Canada
- Formerly: CHUM Radio (1945–2011)
- Type: Subsidiary
- Industry: Radio broadcasting
- Predecessor: CHUM Limited
- Founded: 1945; 81 years ago (as CHUM Limited); 2011; 15 years ago (Bell Media Radio); 2016; 10 years ago (iHeartRadio Canada)
- Headquarters: 250 Richmond Street West, Toronto, Ontario, Canada
- Key people: Randy Lennox (president of broadcasting)
- Parent: Bell Media
- Divisions: Orbyt Media (formerly CHUM Radio Network)
- Website: bellmedia.ca

Bell Media Radio, G.P. (formerly CHUM Radio), operating publicly as iHeartRadio Canada, is the radio broadcasting and audio division of Bell Media, a subsidiary of BCE Inc.. The company owns AM and FM radio stations in markets across Canada, distributes programming to other stations through Orbyt Media, and operates the Canadian version of iHeartRadio under licence from iHeartMedia.

The business originated with the radio assets of CHUM Limited, which were acquired by CTVglobemedia in 2007 and later became part of Bell Media. Bell expanded its radio holdings through the acquisition of Astral Media in 2013, but substantially reduced the portfolio through station closures and sales between 2023 and 2025. As of 2026, Bell Media Radio operates approximately 55 AM and FM stations, along with the shortwave relay CFRX.

== History ==
The company has its origins in CHUM Limited, which was acquired by CTVglobemedia in 2006. Through subsequent acquisitions, it also subsumed the radio properties of Astral Media in 2013; many of these were former Standard Radio stations that were acquired by Astral in 2007.

In 2016, Bell Media reached a licensing agreement with U.S. radio conglomerate iHeartMedia to operate a localized version of its internet radio platform iHeartRadio, and organize Canadian versions of its event franchises (such as the Jingle Ball). Since this agreement, Bell has primarily promoted its audio content, including radio stations and podcasts, under the public-facing brand iHeartRadio Canada.

In 2023, Bell Media laid off 6% of its workforce and closed nine of its radio stations and sold three as part of a restructuring plan and consolidated newsrooms across its platforms, resulting in its news/talk stations laying off most of their news staff and relying instead on the local and national newsrooms of CTV News. Stations closed included Winnipeg's CFRW, Calgary's CKMX, Edmonton's CFRN, Vancouver's CFTE and CKST and London's CJBK while Hamilton's CKOC and CHAM and Windsor's CKWW were sold to CINA Radio Group for $455,000.

On February 8, 2024, parent company BCE announced a total of cuts across the company, including 4,800 layoffs—with approximately 10% of those jobs being at Bell Media specifically, and the sale of 45 of its 103 radio stations to Vista Radio, Whiteoaks Communications Group, Durham Radio, My Broadcasting Corporation, ZoomerMedia, Arsenal Media and Maritime Broadcasting, pending approval by the CRTC. Bell executive Robert Malcolmson told Canadian Press that the "significant divestiture" of Bell's radio assets occurred "because it's not a viable business anymore".

== Operations ==
Former CHUM Radio logo

Its head office is currently located at 250 Richmond Street West in Toronto, where the studios of its Toronto flagship stations CHUM-FM, CKFM-FM, CFRB and CHUM-AM are located. CHUM-AM and CHUM-FM moved from their historic location, 1331 Yonge Street, after the property was sold to Aspen Ridge Homes for $21.5 million. Former Standard Radio stations CFRB and CKFM were previously located at the intersection of Yonge Street and St. Clair Avenue West until 2013.

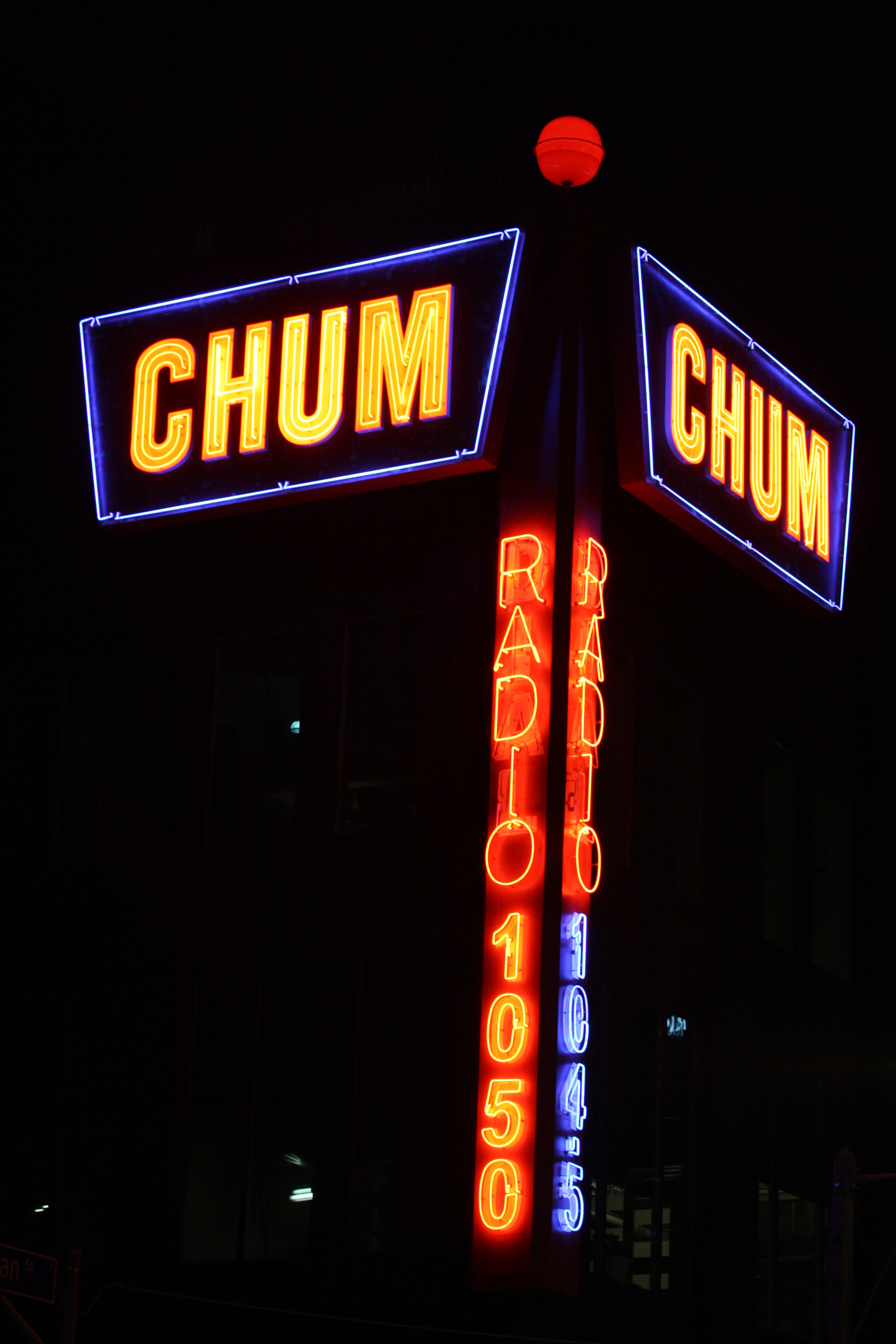
The CHUM neon sign in 2010, relocated to 250 Richmond Street West

CHUM Radio also previously operated CHUM Satellite Services, a multimedia division which provided programming and production services for corporate clients. This operation was acquired in 2009 by Stingray Digital, which eventually renamed it Stingray360.

On January 6, 2016, iHeartMedia announced that Bell Media would enter into a licensing deal to launch a Canadian version of its radio streaming service iHeartRadio. Bell will handle Canadian licensing, marketing, and distribution of the service, contribute its content to the venture, and also gain rights to produce iHeartRadio-branded events. The service launched in October 2016.

Since then, Bell has downplayed the branding "Bell Media Radio" in reference to its stations, and has referred to the collective platform, including the terrestrial stations, online outlets (which were all consolidated under iHeartRadio.ca) and podcasts from Bell Media properties that are distributed under the platform, under the name iHeartRadio Canada. The MuchMusic Video Awards were also re-branded as the iHeartRadio MMVAs.

== Programming ==
Bell's stations broadcast under various formats, although hot adult contemporary and adult hits are particularly common. The stations typically air locally produced or voice-tracked programming for the majority of their schedules, although some national network programming also airs. In 2007 and part of 2008, the hot adult contemporary radio stations also aired the national evening program The Sound Lounge. Many of Bell Media's music radio stations operate under standard, networked formats, combining local programming with shared branding, music scheduling and, in some cases, national or syndicated programs. These brands include:

- Bounce: Adult hits stations. The brand launched on May 18, 2021, when 25 Bell Media stations adopted the format. Many of the stations that adopted the brand were previously adult contemporary, hot adult contemporary, active rock, adult hits or classic hits stations, including the company's remaining Bob FM and EZ Rock-branded stations.
- Move: Adult contemporary stations. The brand launched on December 27, 2020, when 10 Bell Media stations adopted the format.
- Pure Country: country stations. The brand launched on May 28, 2019, when 13 Bell Media stations adopted the format, including 12 existing country stations and newly flipped CKLC-FM in Kingston.
- Virgin Radio: CHR/Top 40 stations, using branding licensed from the Virgin Group. The brand was first introduced in Canada by Astral Media's CKFM-FM in 2008.

Bell's French-language radio stations in Quebec, inherited from Astral Media, have similarly used networked formats:

- Énergie: Mainstream rock stations.
- Rouge FM: Adult contemporary stations.

Bell also inherited Astral's Boom FM (classic hits) and EZ Rock (adult contemporary) brands. Most English-language stations using the Boom FM brand were transferred to Stingray Radio as part of divestitures connected to Bell's acquisition of Astral Media, while Bell's remaining French-language Boom FM stations were sold to Arsenal Media as part of the company's 2024–2025 radio divestitures. The last remaining EZ Rock-branded stations owned by Bell were phased out with the launch of the Bounce and Move brands.

Until 2024, Bell also operated three networked brands featuring talk and spoken word programming. Except for TSN Radio (which features a mix of local programming and other acquired sports talk programs and event broadcasts, often syndicated from ESPN Radio and Westwood One), the majority of this programming was automated with little local content:

- BNN Bloomberg Radio (until 2024): Business news stations, which featured programming from Bloomberg Radio and audio simulcasts of programs from the BNN Bloomberg television channel.
- Funny (until 2024): Carried stand-up comedy. Was initially a Canadian licensee of the U.S. radio network 24/7 Comedy.
- TSN Radio: Sports talk stations, co-branded with Bell's TSN sports channel. Three of the TSN Radio stations were formerly part of a larger but short-lived national sports radio network known as The Team, which was launched by CHUM Limited in 2001 on virtually all of the company's AM radio stations across Canada, but was dissolved in 2002 due to poor ratings. The stations that did not remain AM sports radio stations are either oldies or news/talk formats.

Following the sale or closure of numerous Bell stations in 2023 and 2024, the BNN Bloomberg and Funny radio brands were no longer in use. Aside from three TSN Radio stations, Bell's remaining news/talk stations carry local programming with some regionally or nationally syndicated shows, and audio simulcasts of CTV News programs, under the iHeartRadio Talk Network branding.

Through Orbyt Media, Bell distributes syndicated radio programming in Canada, including The Breakfast Club, The Bobby Bones Show, On Air with Ryan Seacrest, American Top 40 and the Bryan Adams Radio Show.

== Stations ==
City	Call Sign	Frequency	Band	Branding	Network	Format
Brandon, Manitoba	CKX-FM	96.1	FM	Bounce 96.1	Bounce	adult hits
Brandon, Manitoba	CKXA-FM	101.1	FM	Pure Country 101	Pure Country	country
Calgary, Alberta	CIBK-FM	98.5	FM	98.5 Virgin Radio	Virgin Radio	contemporary hit radio
Calgary, Alberta	CJAY-FM	92.1	FM	CJAY 92		mainstream rock
Edmonton, Alberta	CFBR-FM	100.3	FM	100.3 The Bear		active rock
Edmonton, Alberta	CFMG-FM	104.9	FM	104.9 Virgin Radio	Virgin Radio	contemporary hit radio
Fredericton, New Brunswick	CKHJ	1260	AM	Pure Country 103.5	Pure Country	country
Fredericton, New Brunswick	CFXY-FM	105.3	FM	Bounce 105.3	Bounce	adult hits
Fredericton, New Brunswick	CIBX-FM	106.9	FM	Move 106.9	Move Radio	adult contemporary
Gatineau, Quebec	CIMF-FM	94.9	FM	94,9 Rouge	Rouge FM	adult contemporary
Gatineau, Quebec	CKTF-FM	104.1	FM	Énergie 104,1	Énergie	mainstream rock
Halifax, Nova Scotia	CJCH-FM	101.3	FM	101.3 Virgin Radio	Virgin Radio	contemporary hit radio
Halifax, Nova Scotia	CIOO-FM	100.1	FM	Move 100	Move Radio	adult contemporary
Kitchener, Ontario	CFCA-FM	99.5	FM	Virgin Radio 99.5	Virgin Radio	contemporary hit radio
Kitchener, Ontario	CKKW-FM	105.3	FM	Bounce 105.3	Bounce	adult hits
London, Ontario	CIQM-FM	97.5	FM	97.5 Virgin Radio	Virgin Radio	contemporary hit radio
London, Ontario	CJBX-FM	92.7	FM	Pure Country 93	Pure Country	country
Magog, Quebec	CIMO-FM	106.1	FM	Énergie 106,1	Énergie	mainstream rock
Midland, Ontario	CICZ-FM	104.1	FM	Bounce 104.1	Bounce	adult hits
Montreal, Quebec	CKGM	690	AM	TSN 690	TSN Radio	sports
Montreal, Quebec	CJAD	800	AM	CJAD 800 AM	iHeart Radio Talk Network	news/talk
Montreal, Quebec	CHOM-FM	97.7	FM	CHOM 97.7		mainstream rock
Montreal, Quebec	CJFM-FM	95.9	FM	95.9 Virgin Radio	Virgin Radio	contemporary hit radio
Montreal, Quebec	CKMF-FM	94.3	FM	Énergie 94,3	Énergie	mainstream rock
Montreal, Quebec	CITE-FM	107.3	FM	107,3 Rouge	Rouge FM	adult contemporary
Orillia, Ontario	CICX-FM	105.9	FM	Pure Country 106	Pure Country	country
Ottawa, Ontario	CFRA	580	AM	580 CFRA	iHeart Radio Talk Network	news/talk
Ottawa, Ontario	CFGO	1200	AM	TSN 1200	TSN Radio	sports
Ottawa, Ontario	CKKL-FM	93.9	FM	Pure Country 94	Pure Country	country
Ottawa, Ontario	CJMJ-FM	100.3	FM	Move 100	Move Radio	adult contemporary
Pembroke, Ontario	CHVR-FM	96.7	FM	Pure Country 96.7	Pure Country	country
Quebec City, Quebec	CHIK-FM	98.9	FM	Énergie 98,9	Énergie	mainstream rock
Quebec City, Quebec	CITF-FM	107.5	FM	107,5 Rouge	Rouge FM	adult contemporary
Regina, Saskatchewan	CHBD-FM	92.7	FM	Pure Country 92.7	Pure Country	country
Rouyn-Noranda, Quebec	CJMM-FM	99.1	FM	Énergie 99,1	Énergie	mainstream rock
Saguenay, Quebec	CFIX-FM	96.9	FM	96,9 Rouge	Rouge FM	adult contemporary
Saguenay, Quebec	CJAB-FM	94.5	FM	Énergie 94,5	Énergie	mainstream rock
Sherbrooke, Quebec	CITE-FM-1	102.7	FM	102,7 Rouge	Rouge FM	adult contemporary
Sudbury, Ontario	CICS-FM	91.7	FM	Pure Country 91.7	Pure Country	country
Toronto, Ontario	CFRB	1010	AM	Newstalk 1010	iHeart Radio Talk Network	news/talk
Toronto, Ontario	CFRX	6070	SW	Newstalk 1010	iHeart Radio Talk Network	news/talk
Toronto, Ontario	CHUM	1050	AM	TSN 1050	TSN Radio	sports
Toronto, Ontario	CHUM-FM	104.5	FM	CHUM 104.5		hot adult contemporary
Toronto, Ontario	CKFM-FM	99.9	FM	99.9 Virgin Radio	Virgin Radio	contemporary hit radio
Trois-Rivières, Quebec	CHEY-FM	94.7	FM	94,7 Rouge	Rouge FM	adult contemporary
Trois-Rivières, Quebec	CIGB-FM	102.3	FM	Énergie 102,3	Énergie	mainstream rock
Val-d'Or, Quebec	CJMV-FM	102.7	FM	Énergie 102,7	Énergie	mainstream rock
Vancouver, British Columbia	CFBT-FM	94.5	FM	94.5 Virgin Radio	Virgin Radio	contemporary hit radio
Vancouver, British Columbia	CHQM-FM	103.5	FM	Move 103.5	Move Radio	adult contemporary
Victoria, British Columbia	CFAX	1070	AM	CFAX 1070	iHeart Radio Talk Network	news/talk
Victoria, British Columbia	CHBE-FM	107.3	FM	107.3 Virgin Radio	Virgin Radio	contemporary hit radio
Windsor, Ontario	CKLW	800	AM	AM 800 CKLW	iHeart Radio Talk Network	news/talk
Windsor, Ontario	CIDR-FM	93.9	FM	93.9 Virgin Radio	Virgin Radio	contemporary hit radio
Windsor, Ontario	CIMX-FM	88.7	FM	89X		alternative rock
Winnipeg, Manitoba	CFWM-FM	99.9	FM	Bounce 99.9	Bounce	adult hits
Winnipeg, Manitoba	CKMM-FM	103.1	FM	103.1 Virgin Radio	Virgin Radio	contemporary hit radio

=== Former stations ===
City of licence	Call sign	Frequency	Band	Years owned	Fate
Amqui, QC	CFVM-FM	99.9	FM	2013–2025	Sold to Arsenal Media in 2024, CRTC approved sale in 2025
Bathurst, NB	CKBC-FM	104.9	FM	2013–2024	Sold to Maritime Broadcasting System in 2024
Brockville, ON	CJPT-FM	103.7	FM	1996–2025	Sold to My Broadcasting Corporation in 2024, CRTC approved sale in 2025
Brockville, ON	CFJR-FM	104.9	FM	1997–2025	Sold to My Broadcasting Corporation in 2024, CRTC approved sale in 2025
Calgary, AB	CKMX	1060	AM	2013–2023	Defunct, ceased operations in 2023
Calgary, AB	CFVP	6.03	SW	2013-2023	Defunct shortwave relay of CKMX
Dawson Creek, BC	CJDC	890	AM	2013–2025	Sold to Vista Radio in 2024, CRTC approved sale in 2025
Drummondville, QC	CHRD-FM	105.3	FM	2013–2025	Sold to Arsenal Media in 2024, CRTC approved sale in 2025
Drummondville, QC	CJDM-FM	92.1	FM	2013–2025	Sold to Arsenal Media in 2024, CRTC approved sale in 2025
Edmonton, AB	CFRN	1260	AM	2013–2023	Defunct, ceased operations in 2023
Edmonton, AB	CHBN-FM	91.7	FM	2005–2010	Sold to Rogers Sports & Media in 2010
Fort Nelson, BC	CKRX-FM	102.3	FM	2013–2025	Sold to Vista Radio in 2024, CRTC approved sale in 2025
Fort St. John, BC	CHRX-FM	98.5	FM	2013–2025	Sold to Vista Radio in 2024, CRTC approved sale in 2025
Fort St. John, BC	CKNL-FM	101.5	FM	2013–2025	Sold to Vista Radio in 2024, CRTC approved sale in 2025
Golden, BC	CKGR-FM	106.3	FM	2013–2025	Sold to Vista Radio in 2024, CRTC approved sale in 2025
Grand Falls, NB	CIKX-FM	93.5	FM	2013–2024	Sold to Maritime Broadcasting in 2024
Hamilton, ON	CHAM	820	AM	2013–2024	Sold to CINA Radio Group in 2023, CRTC approved sale in 2024
Hamilton, ON	CKOC	1150	AM	2013–2024	Sold to CINA Radio Group in 2023, CRTC approved sale in 2024
Hamilton, ON	CKLH-FM	102.9	FM	2007–2024	Sold to Golden Horseshoe Broadcasting in 2024.
Kawartha Lakes, ON	CKLY-FM	91.9	FM	2000–2025	Sold to Durham Radio in 2024, CRTC approved sale in 2025.
Kelowna, BC	CKFR	1150	AM	2013–2025	Sold to Vista Radio in 2024, CRTC approved sale in 2025
Kelowna, BC	CHSU-FM	99.9	FM	2013–2025	Sold to Vista Radio in 2024, CRTC approved sale in 2025
Kelowna, BC	CILK-FM	101.5	FM	2013–2025	Sold to Vista Radio in 2024, CRTC approved sale in 2025
Kingston, ON	CFLY-FM	98.3	FM	1997–2025	Sold to My Broadcasting Corporation in 2024, CRTC approved sale in 2025
Kingston, ON	CKLC-FM	98.9	FM	1997–2025	Sold to My Broadcasting Corporation in 2024, CRTC approved sale in 2025
Kitimat, BC	CKTK-FM	97.7	FM	2013–2025	Sold to Vista Radio in 2024, CRTC approved sale in 2025
London, ON	CKSL	1410	AM	2013–2016	Defunct, ceased operations in 2016
London, ON	CJBK	1290	AM	2013–2023	Defunct, ceased operations in 2023
London, ON	CHST-FM	102.3	FM	2000–2010	Sold to Rogers Sports & Media in 2010
Nelson, BC	CKKC-FM	106.9	FM	2013–2025	Sold to Vista Radio in 2024, CRTC approved sale in 2025
Osoyoos, BC	CJOR	1240	AM	2007–2025	Sold to Vista Radio in 2024, CRTC approved sale in 2025
Owen Sound, ON	CJOS-FM	92.3	FM	2018–2024	Sold to ZoomerMedia in 2024
Penticton, BC	CKOR	800	AM	2013–2025	Sold to Vista Radio in 2024, CRTC approved sale in 2025
Penticton, BC	CJMG-FM	97.1	FM	2013–2025	Sold to Vista Radio in 2024, CRTC approved sale in 2025
Peterborough, ON	CKPT-FM	99.7	FM	1977–2025	Sold to Durham Radio in 2024, CRTC approved sale in 2025.
Peterborough, ON	CKQM-FM	105.1	FM	1977–2025	Sold to Durham Radio in 2024, CRTC approved sale in 2025.
Prince Rupert, BC	CHTK-FM	99.1	FM	2013–2025	Sold to Vista Radio in 2024, CRTC approved sale in 2025
Revelstoke, BC	CKCR-FM	106.1	FM	2013–2025	Sold to Vista Radio in 2024, CRTC approved sale in 2025
Rimouski, QC	CIKI-FM	98.7	FM	2013–2025	Sold to Arsenal Media in 2024
Rimouski, QC	CJOI-FM	102.9	FM	2013–2025	Sold to Arsenal Media in 2024, CRTC approved sale in 2025
Saint-Hyacinthe, QC	CFEI-FM	106.5	FM	2013–2025	Sold to Arsenal Media in 2024, CRTC approved sale in 2025
Saint-Jean-sur-Richelieu, QC	CFZZ-FM	104.1	FM	2013–2025	Sold to Arsenal Media in 2024, CRTC approved sale in 2025
St. Catharines, ON	CKTB	610	AM	2013–2024	Sold to Golden Horseshoe Broadcasting in 2024
St. Catharines, ON	CHRE-FM	105.7	FM	2013–2024	Sold to Golden Horseshoe Broadcasting in 2024
St. Catharines, ON	CHTZ-FM	97.7	FM	2013–2024	Sold to Golden Horseshoe Broadcasting in 2024
Salmon Arm, BC	CKXR-FM	91.5	FM	2013–2025	Sold to Vista Radio in 2024, CRTC approved sale in 2025
Summerland, BC	CHOR-FM	98.5	FM	2013–2025	Sold to Vista Radio in 2024, CRTC approved sale in 2025
Terrace, BC	CFTK	590	AM	2013–2025	Sold to Vista Radio in 2024, CRTC approved sale in 2025
Terrace, BC	CJFW-FM	103.1	FM	2013–2025	Sold to Vista Radio in 2024, CRTC approved sale in 2025
Toronto, ON	CFXJ-FM	93.5	FM	2010–2013	Sold to Stingray Radio in 2013
Trail, BC	CJAT-FM	95.7	FM	2013–2025	Sold to Vista Radio in 2024, CRTC approved sale in 2025
Truro, NS	CKTO-FM	100.9	FM	2013–2024	Sold to Maritime Broadcasting in 2024
Truro, NS	CKTY-FM	99.5	FM	2013–2024	Sold to Maritime Broadcasting in 2024
Vancouver, BC	CKST	1040	AM	1992–2023	Defunct, ceased operations in 2023
Vancouver, BC	CFTE	1410	AM	1973–2023	Defunct, ceased operations in 2023
Vernon, BC	CICF-FM	105.7	FM	2013–2025	Sold to Vista Radio in 2024, CRTC approved sale in 2025
Windsor, ON	CKWW	580	AM	1985–2024	Sold to CINA Radio Group in 2023, CRTC approved sale in 2024
Winnipeg, MB	CFRW	1290	AM	1974–2023	Sold to Akash Broadcasting in 2025
Woodstock, NB	CJCJ-FM	104.1	FM	2013–2024	Sold to Maritime Broadcasting in 2024

== See also ==
- List of assets owned by Bell Media
- Virgin Radio
