= CIPC-FM =

Radio station in Port-Cartier–Sept-Îles, Quebec

Coordinates: 50°10′29″N 66°44′34″W

- Port-Cartier, Quebec; Canada
- Broadcast area: Sept-Îles, Quebec
- Frequency: 99.1 MHz
- Branding: 0 99.1

Programming
- Language: French

Ownership
- Owner: Arsenal Media

History
- First air date: 1976
- Former frequencies: 710 kHz (1976–1993)
- Call sign meaning: PC for Port-Cartier

Technical information
- Class: C1
- ERP: horizontal polarization only: 18.766 kWs average 45.016 kWs peak
- HAAT: 233 metres (764 ft)

Links
- Website: o991.ca

CIPC-FM is a Canadian radio station that broadcasts on the frequency at 99.1 MHz on the FM band in Sept-Îles and Port-Cartier on the Côte-Nord, Quebec. The station mainly broadcasts Top 40 music and rock songs, it is part of the “O” network just like the stations CFJO-FM, CHOE-FM and CHEQ-FM. The studios are located at 106 rue Napoléon, bureau 400 in Sept-Îles, at the same address as the studio of its sister station CKCN-FM. The letters "PC" in its call sign refer to Port-Cartier.

== Station history ==
On February 14, 1974, Radio Sept-Îles Inc. (owner of CKCN Sept-Îles) received authorization to operate a new AM station in Port-Cartier. Two years later, on October 4, 1976, CIPC made its official arrival on the AM band at the frequency 710 kHz. The station which was owned by Radio Sept-Îles inc. passed into the hands of Radio Port-Cartier inc. in August 1982.

On September 24, 1993, the CRTC approved Radio Port-Cartier's application to convert CIPC from the AM band at 710 kHz to the FM band at 99.1 MHz. CIPC made the transition to the FM band at the frequency 99.1 MHz in 1994. The station adopted a new format in 2009 focused on contemporary hits as 99.1 FM La Radioactive.

The station is authorised to broadcast at a maximum ERP (effective radiated power) of 45,016 watts; on June 8, 2010, the CRTC denied CIPC-FM's application to increase their maximum ERP to 100,000 watts, following opposition from competing stations CKCN-FM in Sept-Îles and CHLC-FM in Baie-Comeau.

Attraction Radio (now Arsenal Media) acquired CKCN-FM in Sept-Îles and CIPC-FM in Port-Cartier in the summer of 2016.

On August 30, 2017, it was announced that La Radioactive 99.1 will make way for a new musical format with a new branding by joining the “O” network. It will therefore become O 99.1. This change took place on September 8 of the same year.

== Former logos ==
CIPC-FM logo (2009-2017)
