= K103 =

K103 may refer to:

- HMCS Alberni (K103), a Canadian Royal Navy corvette
- KKCW, the radio station "K103" broadcasting in Portland, Oregon
- CKRK-FM, the radio station "K103" broadcasting in Kahnawake, Quebec
- K-103 (Kansas highway), a state highway in Kansas
