= CIMH-FM =

Former radio station in Sept-Îles, Quebec

CIMH-FM was a radio station which operated on 94.1 MHz/FM in Sept-Îles, Quebec, Canada. Broadcasting began in August 1980, the station was owned by Radio FM du Nord.

== History ==
The station was established in 1979 by Clement Gagnon, initially with effective radiated power of 82,500 watts. CIMH-FM was the first local commercial FM station in the market, with its emphasis on local and regional news. The broadcaster, Radio FM du Nord, was jointly owned by Gagnon and his business partners, M. Paquet and Jacques Beaulieu. Ownership later changed with Gagnon owning 50.1% and Beaulieu retaining 49.9%.

In 1980, CIMH-FM was authorized to increase effective radiated power to 100,000 watts.

=== Closure ===
The licence for CIMH-FM was revoked at the request of the licensee and left the air in 1982.

The 94.1 frequency was later used by CKCN-FM, after that station's transfer from 560 kHz in 1998.
