= CJOI =

CJOI may refer to:

- CJOI-FM, a radio station (102.9 FM) licensed to Rimouski, Quebec, Canada
- CKJR, a radio station (1440 AM) licensed to Wetaskiwin, Alberta, Canada, which held the call sign CJOI from 1971 to the 1990s
