= CHRD =

CHRD may refer to:

- Chordin, Chordin, the gene for a human protein involved in embryonic development
- CHRD-FM, Canadian radio station
- Chinese Human Rights Defenders, a human rights activist group
