= CIGB =

CIGB can mean:

- Center for Genetic Engineering and Biotechnology (Centro de Ingeniería Genética y Biotecnología), a research institute in Havana, Cuba
- CIGB-FM, a French-language radio station located in Trois-Rivières, Quebec, Canada
