= CHXX-FM =

Radio station in Quebec City

Coordinates: 46°49′17″N 71°29′46″W

- Quebec City, Quebec; Canada
- Frequency: 100.9 MHz
- Branding: BPM Sports 100.9 Québec

Programming
- Language: French
- Format: Sports

Ownership
- Owner: Arsenal Media
- Sister stations: CJSQ-FM

History
- First air date: 1995

Technical information
- Licensing authority: CRTC
- Class: B
- ERP: 1,585 watts
- HAAT: 429 metres (1,407 ft)

Links
- Website: bpmsports.ca

CHXX-FM (100.9 FM, "BPM Sports 100.9 Québec") is a French-language radio station licensed to Quebec City, Quebec, Canada. Owned by Arsenal Media, it carries a sports talk format as an affiliate of Arsenal's BPM Sports network.

It broadcasts with an effective radiated power of 1,585 watts (class B) using an omnidirectional antenna. The station also has one rebroadcaster, operating on 105.5 FM in Lotbinière.

== History ==
Under its former call sign CKNU, the station had a classic rock format and was largely automated. It was best known for having been the home of controversial host André Arthur from August 2002 until December 2005. RNC Media fired most employees, including Arthur, after it acquired the station from Genex Communications in December 2005.

As of July 31, 2007, CKNU changed its call name to CHXX-FM and became Radio X2 100 9, a modern rock radio station similar to its sister modern rock station Radio X (CHOI-FM, which is now a talk station). In August 2019, the station rebranded as simply 100,9, with an adult hits format.

In 2021, the station flipped to contemporary hit radio as Vibe 100.9; the station shared its branding and airstaff with CFTX-FM in Gatineau. On August 29, 2022, both Vibe stations flipped to sports talk as BPM Sports, networked with Montreal sister station CKLX-FM. Due to CRTC license restrictions requiring at least 50% of their weekly programming to be devoted to music, the stations only carry BPM Sports' weekday and weekend morning lineups, do not carry its play-by-play rights (such as CF Montréal), and otherwise continue to carry music programming. The station's local sports programming is currently limited to La Tribune Capitale, a Quebec City-based program that is part of the network schedule.

In November 2025, RNC announced the sale of all three BPM Sports stations alongside to Arsenal Media pending CRTC approval. The CRTC approved the purchase on July 14, 2026. Sister station CJSQ-FM was sold to Arsenal Media from owner Charles Gregory.
