= CIMF-FM =

Radio station in Gatineau

Coordinates: 45.43507°N 75.73323°W

- Gatineau, Quebec; Canada
- Broadcast area: National Capital Region; Eastern Ontario; Outaouais
- Frequency: 94.9 MHz
- Branding: 94,9 Rouge

Programming
- Language: French
- Format: Adult contemporary
- Affiliations: Rouge FM

Ownership
- Owner: Bell Media; (Bell Media Radio)
- Sister stations: CKTF-FM

History
- First air date: January 1, 1970
- Former call signs: CKCH-FM (1970–1976)
- Call sign meaning: CI Modulation de Fréquence (French for "frequency modulation")

Technical information
- Class: C1
- ERP: 84,000 watts
- HAAT: 323 metres (1,060 ft)
- Translator: CIMF-FM-1 88.9 MHz Hawkesbury

Links
- Website: www.rougefm.ca/gatineau-ottawa.html

CIMF-FM (94.9 MHz) is a French-language Canadian radio station in Gatineau, Quebec, and serving the National Capital Region, including Ottawa. It has an adult contemporary format and is part of Bell Canada's Rouge FM network which operates across Quebec and Eastern Ontario. The radio studios and offices are in Gatineau at 215 Boulevard Saint-Joseph in the same building as co-owned 104.1 CKTF-FM, part of the NRJ radio network.

CIMF-FM has an effective radiated power (ERP) of 84,000 watts. It is a Class C1 station using an omnidirectional antenna located in Camp Fortune, Quebec, within Gatineau Park.

== History ==
=== Beautiful Music ===
The station signed on the air on January 1, 1970. Its original call sign was CKCH-FM as the sister station to the now-defunct CKCH 970 AM. The AM station went silent on September 30, 1994, when the "Telemedia" and "Radiomutuel" networks merged to form the "Radiomédia" network (now "Corus Québec").

CKCH-FM, and later CIMF-FM, had a beautiful music format for its first 20 years, playing mostly instrumental cover songs of popular hits. Over time, to stay contemporary, it added more soft vocals. The station switched to soft adult contemporary in 1990 and the station was renamed CIMF Rock-Détente.

=== RockDétente ===
CIMF-FM's last RockDétente-era logo; used from 2004 until August 2011

In 2004, Astral Media revamped the Rock Détente network with a new logo. This resulted in CIMF Rock-Détente being renamed to simply 94,9 RockDétente. As such, the station no longer publicly uses its call sign (although the call letters were brought back as station identification in 2011).

=== Rouge FM ===
CIMF-FM's former Rouge FM logo; used from 2011 until 2017

On August 18, 2011, at 4 p.m., the station ended its 21-year run with the "RockDétente" branding. All "RockDétente" stations, including CIMF, rebranded as Rouge FM.

The last song under "RockDétente" was "Pour que tu m'aimes encore" by Celine Dion, followed by a tribute of the branding. The first song under "Rouge" was "I Gotta Feeling" by Black Eyed Peas.

== Transmitters ==
Rebroadcasters of CIMF-FM
| City of licence | Identifier | Frequency | Power | Class | RECNet | CRTC Decision |
|---|---|---|---|---|---|---|
| Hawkesbury | CIMF-FM-1 | 88.9 FM | 1,250 watts | A | Query | Decision CRTC 2001-239 |

On October 31, 2000, Télémédia Radio was denied a licence to add a new FM transmitter to operate on 107.7 MHz at Hawkesbury, Ontario.

Since 2001, the station operated a relay transmitter in Hawkesbury, Ontario, approximately 100 kilometres east of Ottawa/Gatineau. This results from a deal between Telemedia (which then owned CIMF-FM) and Radio-Canada to allow the latter to raise the power of CBF-FM 95.1 MHz in Montreal, Quebec from 17,030 to 100,000 watts. The relay, CIMF-FM-1 in Hawkesbury, operates on 88.9 MHz using a directional antenna with an average effective radiated power of 759 watts and a peak effective radiated power of 1,250 watts (class A).
