= CJSQ-FM =

Radio station in Quebec City, Quebec

Coordinates: 46°49′22″N 71°29′41″W

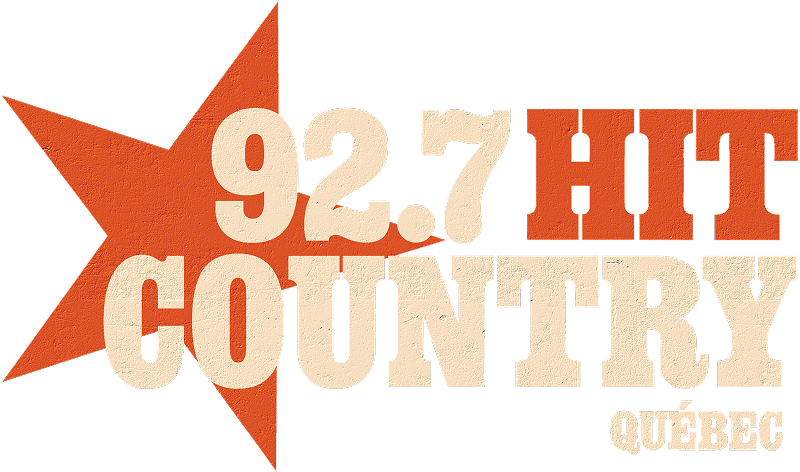
- Quebec City, Quebec; Canada
- Frequency: 92.7 MHz
- Branding: Hit Country 92.7

Programming
- Format: Country

Ownership
- Owner: Arsenal Media
- Sister stations: CHXX-FM

History
- First air date: July 15, 2007

Technical information
- Class: B
- ERP: 2,840 watts
- HAAT: 472 meters (1,549 ft)

Links
- Website: hitcountry927.com

CJSQ-FM is a French-language Canadian radio station located in Quebec City, Quebec, broadcasting on 92.7 MHz using an omnidirectional antenna with an effective radiated power of 2,840 watts (class B). The station broadcasts a French language country music format branded as Hit Country 92.7 and is owned by Arsenal Media.

The station that broadcast classical music was previously founded and owned by Radio-Classique Québec, Inc., a company that was 90% owned by Jean-Pierre Coallier. While it was controlled by the same principal owners, the two companies are legally separate. From 2007 to 2020, it was a sister station to CJPX-FM, a classical music station serving Montreal.

== History ==
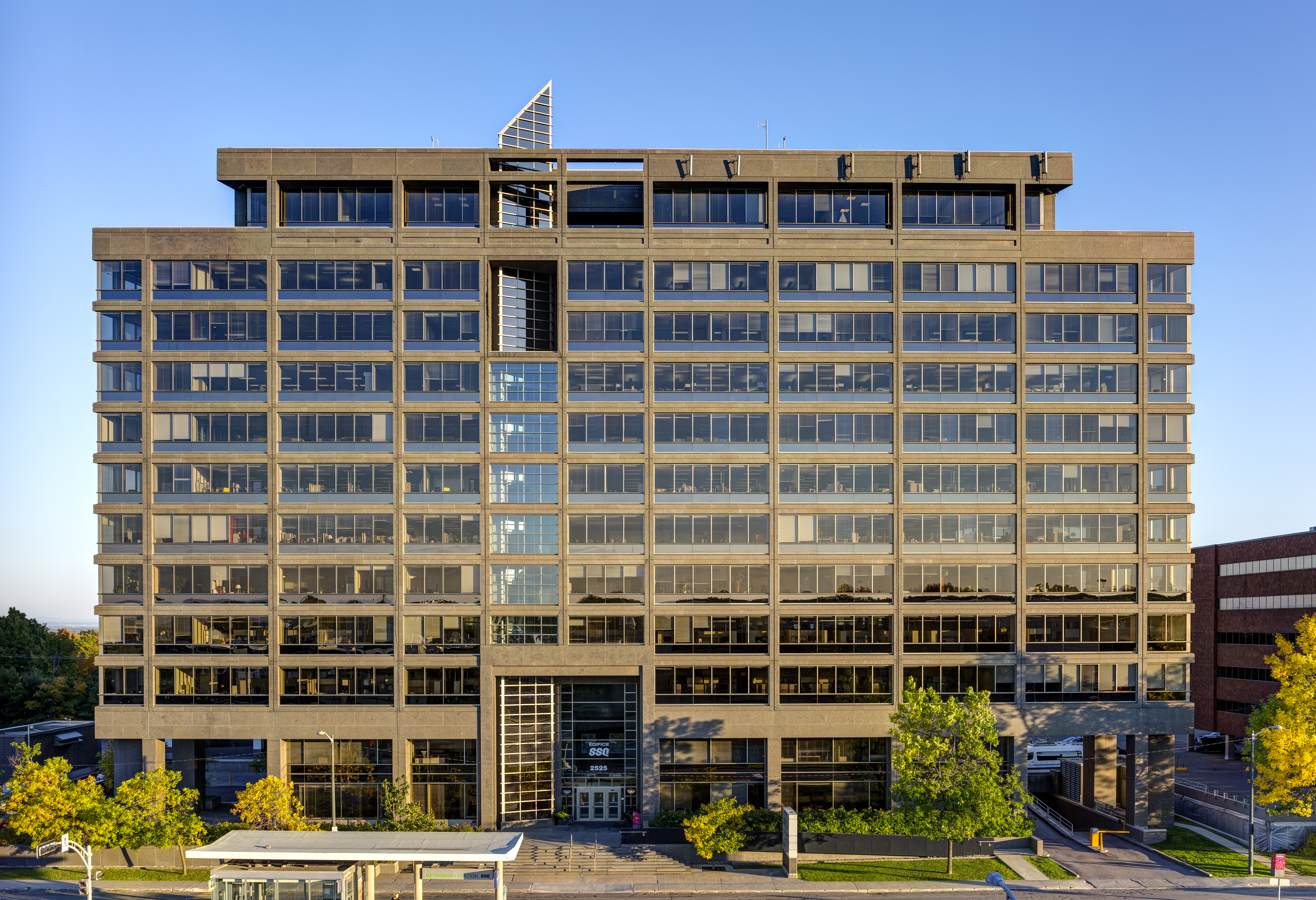
Quebec studios are located on Laurier boulevard in Sainte-Foy.

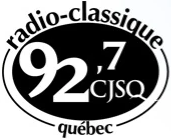
Logo from 2007 to 2015.

On August 10, 2006, the CRTC approved Radio-Classique's application for a broadcasting licence in Quebec City. The station went on air on July 15, 2007.

In December 2014, it was announced that both CJSQ and CJPX would be sold to Groupe Musique Greg, a company founded by Montreal musician and radio personality Gregory Charles. Charles' offer to buy the two stations came in response to rumours that Coallier was looking to retire and sell them.

Logo from 2015 to August 31, 2026.

Under Charles' ownership, the station broadcasts a selection of orchestral music, jazz and chanson. Most of the programming is simulcast with CJPX-FM, with Béatrice Zacharie and Jasmin Hains originating from CJSQ-FM and simulcast in Montreal on CJPX-FM.

In April 2020, Leclerc Communication, owners of competing station CJEC-FM, acquired CJPX-FM; that station would flip to an adult contemporary format as WKND 99.5, breaking off the simulcast with CJSQ-FM.

Alongside CHXX-FM previously owned by RNC Media and sold on July 14, 2026, the station becomes Hit Country 92.7 Québec on August 31, 2026, after owner Charles Gregory sold the station to Arsenal Media and The CRTC approved that purchase.
