= CHRM-FM =

Radio station in Matane, Quebec

Coordinates: 48°49′54″N 67°21′50″W

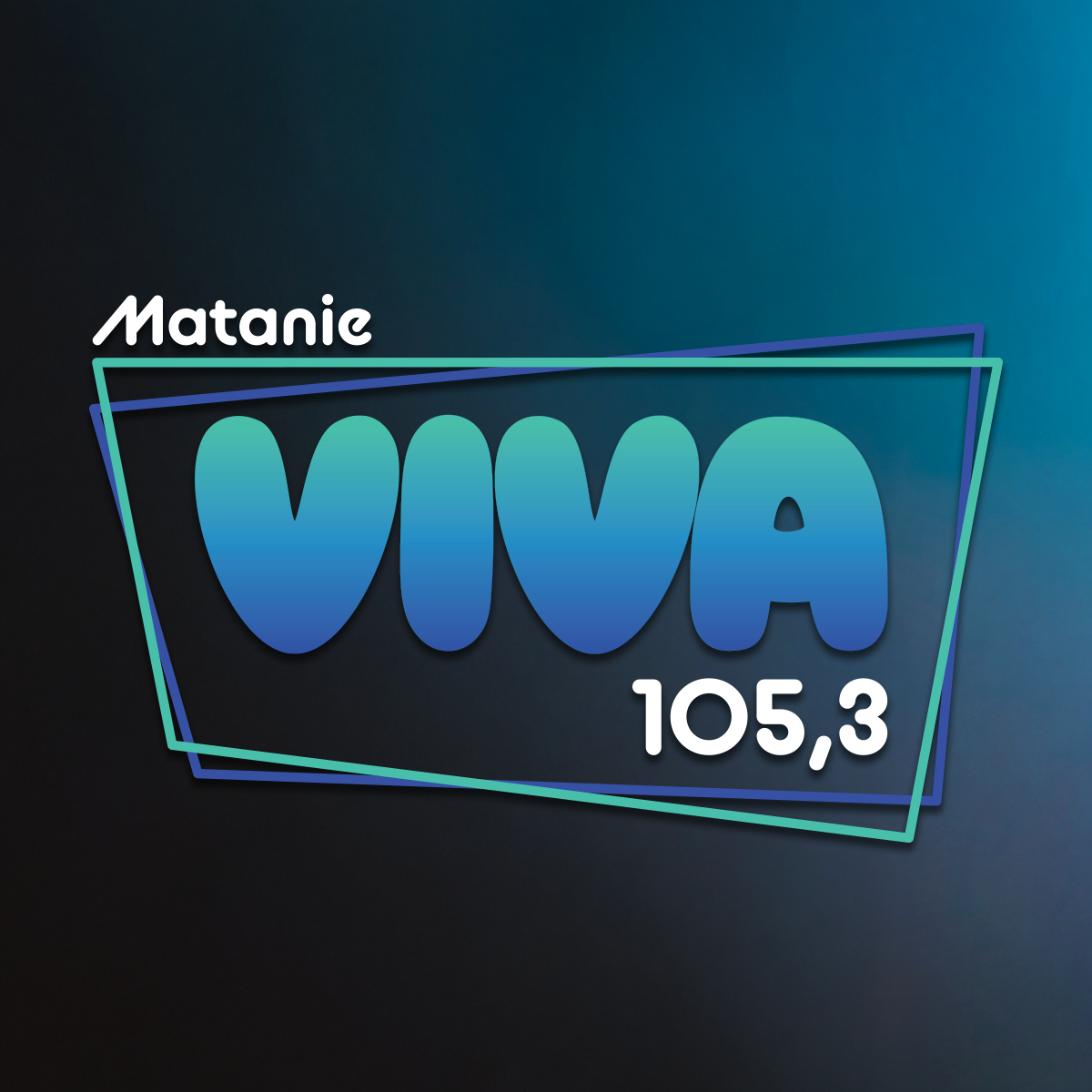

Matane, Quebec; Canada
- Frequency: 105.3 FM
- Branding: Viva 105,3

Programming
- Format: adult contemporary

Ownership
- Owner: Arsenal Media
- Sister stations: CHOE-FM

History
- First air date: April 13, 1975
- Former frequencies: 1290 AM

Technical information
- Class: B
- ERP: 30 kilowatts
- HAAT: 180.2 metres (591 ft)

CHRM-FM is a French-language Canadian radio station located in Matane, Quebec.

Owned and operated by Arsenal Media, who purchased it from Les Communications Matane Inc in 2016.

It broadcasts on 105.3 MHz using an omnidirectional antenna with an effective radiated power of 30,000 watts (class B). CHRM-FM also operates a relay, CHRM-FM-1 in Les Méchins which operates on 91.3 MHz using a directional antenna with an average effective radiated power of 23 watts and a peak effective radiated power of 49 watts (class LP).

The station has an adult contemporary format, and has occasionally had some talk programming and sports play-by-play.

Originally known as CHRM when the station was on the AM band on 1290 kHz, the station moved to FM in 2001. CHRM went on the air on April 13, 1975 and was the first local private radio service in Matane since CKBL (now CBGA-FM) was bought by Radio-Canada in 1972.

The relay in Les Méchins, which was added as part of the conversion to FM, was originally on 104.1 MHz; it was moved to 91.3 MHz in 2005.
