= Rouge FM =

Canadian network of French-language adult contemporary radio stations

- Type: Radio network
- Country: Canada
- Headquarters: Montreal, Quebec, Canada

Programming
- Language(s): French
- Format: Adult contemporary

Ownership
- Owner: Bell Media Radio (Bell Media)

History
- Launch date: 1990
- Former names: RockDétente (1990–2011)

Coverage
- Availability: Quebec

Links
- Website: Rouge

Rouge FM (or Rouge) is a network of French-language adult contemporary radio stations broadcasting throughout Quebec, Canada. Established in 1990 as RockDétente, they are owned by Bell Media.

All "Rouge" stations broadcast in the same markets as Bell's mainstream rock network, "Énergie", although Énergie also has a few stations in markets not served by "Rouge FM".

Although the stations concentrate on French adult contemporary music, it would mix in English music as well (especially in areas outside of Montreal and Ottawa, where English radio service is not available) much like Cogeco's "Rythme FM" network, which has fewer stations than "Rouge". The flagship radio station is Montreal's CITE-FM. The Astral jingles on this network are different from the adult hits jingles used by Astral's English-language adult contemporary stations, nut the network uses a very relaxing acoustic tune.

On August 18, 2011, at 4:00 p.m. EDT, all RockDétente stations were rebranded as "Rouge FM", when the longtime "RockDétente" branding was retired after a 21-year run. On most stations, the last song as "RockDétente" was "Pour que tu m'aimes encore" by Celine Dion, followed by a tribute of the branding. The first song under "Rouge" was "I Gotta Feeling" by Black Eyed Peas. After rebranding, most of the soft rock songs were dropped, leaving the "Rythme FM" network to continue broadcasting them and moving "Rouge FM" towards a hot adult contemporary direction. By 2012, most of the classic hits and ballads returned due to the 35th anniversary of flagship CITE-FM Montreal, going towards its old RockDétente direction. From May 2011 to March 2012, the stations started identifying their call letters during station identification, and on April 27 to 29, 2012, the network was briefly rebranded Rose FM as a charitable promotion for breast cancer research.

All stations carry most Rouge FM programming simultaneously except for CITF-FM in Quebec City, all of which is programmed locally except for a few networked programs.

== RockVelours ==

From 2006 to 2010, Astral also programmed a satellite radio channel for broadcast on Sirius Canada and the American Sirius Satellite Radio, using the same format as the RockDétente stations but branded as RockVelours ("Velvet Rock"). The channel was originally located on channel 192, but later moved to channel 88 by June 2008. Its logo was also updated to include the channel number switch.

This channel was programmed separately from the terrestrial stations and was hosted by Mélanie Gagné and Jean-François Fillion. However, Astral Media sold the channel to Sirius Canada in September 2010, dropped the English artists, and renamed it L'Oasis francophone, having a similar fate made with Énergie^{2} that time.

== Rouge FM stations ==
Station ID	Frequency	City
CFIX-FM	96.9 FM	Saguenay
CHEY-FM	94.7 FM	Trois-Rivières
CIMF-FM	94.9 FM	Gatineau/Ottawa
CITE-FM	107.3 FM	Montreal
CITE-FM-1	102.7 FM	Sherbrooke
CITF-FM	107.5 FM	Quebec City

=== Affiliates ===
- CFRT-FM 107.3, Iqaluit, Nunavut—community radio station that also carries some Rouge FM programming.

=== Former stations ===
- CHOA-FM 96.5 / 103.5 / 103.9, Rouyn-Noranda—owned by Arsenal Media, used RockDétente branding and imaging under license, discontinued the RockDétente branding in 2005
- CJOI-FM 102.9 FM, Rimouski—owned by Arsenal Media, switched format to Viva FM in 2025
- CJPN-FM 90.5, Fredericton, New Brunswick—former community radio affiliate that carried RockDétente during the night but has dropped its programming
- CFVM-FM 99.9, Amqui/Matane—owned by Arsenal Media, switched format to Viva FM in 2025 when Arsenal acquired the station.
- CHRD-FM 105.3, Drummondville—owned by Arsenal Media, switched format to Viva FM in 2025 when Arsenal acquired the station.
