= CFVD-FM =

Radio station in Dégelis, Quebec, Canada

Coordinates: 47°33′02″N 68°43′46″W

- Dégelis, Quebec; Canada
- Broadcast area: Temiscouata
- Frequency: 95.5 MHz
- Branding: O 95,5

Programming
- Language: French
- Format: hot adult contemporary

Ownership
- Owner: Arsenal Media

History
- First air date: 1978
- Former frequencies: 1370 kHz (1978–1994)
- Call sign meaning: Français Ville Dégelis

Technical information
- Licensing authority: CRTC
- Class: B
- ERP: 12,474 watts
- HAAT: 169 metres (554 ft)

Links
- Webcast: Listen live
- Website: o955.ca

CFVD-FM is a French language Hot adult contemporary radio station that operates at 95.5 FM in Dégelis, Quebec, Canada.

Created by Radio Dégelis Inc., the station was licensed in 1978 at 1370 kHz with a transmitter of 1000 watts, and was licensed to convert to FM in 1994.

CFVD-FM applied twice to the CRTC, in 2006 and 2010, to add an FM transmitter at Rivière-du-Loup, Quebec which would operate at 102.5 MHz; they were denied both times.

To highlight its 30th anniversary, the station took on the name Horizon FM in 2008.

In 2012 the station was acquired by a group called Attraction Radio, who later morphed into Arsenal Media. Since 2021 Arsenal Media has incorporated the station in its Plaisir branding until 2025 it switched to O network in April 2025, which designates pop and nostalgia-oriented content.

== Transmitters ==
Rebroadcasters of CFVD-FM
City of licence	Identifier	Frequency	Power	Class	RECNet	CRTC Decision
Pohénégamook	CFVD-FM-2	92.1 (originally 104.9) MHz	294 (originally 50) watts	221A	Query	2004-168
Saint-Michel-du-Squatec	CFVD-FM-3	92.1 MHz	301 (originally 16.1) watts	221A	Query	

Those transmitters were installed in 1983 and 1985 respectively. In 1983 the station established a repeater in Cabano, CFVD-FM-1; at 102.7 MHz and 50 watts; this repeater closed down after the core station migrated from AM to FM.
