= CFLM-FM =

Radio station in La Tuque, Quebec, Canada

Coordinates: 47°25′24″N 72°45′49″W

La Tuque, Quebec; Canada
- Frequency: 97.1 MHz
- Branding: O 97.1

Programming
- Format: Adult contemporary

Ownership
- Owner: Arsenal Media

History
- First air date: October 3, 1959
- Former frequencies: 1240 kHz (1959–2012)

Technical information
- Class: B
- Power: 18,230 watts (maximum ERP of 32,000 watts)

Links
- Website: o971.ca

CFLM-FM is a French-language Canadian radio station located in La Tuque, Quebec.

Owned and operated by Radio Haute-Mauricie, it broadcasts on 97.1 MHz with power of 18,230 watts (maximum ERP of 32,000 watts) as a class B station.

The station has an adult contemporary format and identifies itself as O 97.1.

Formerly an affiliate of the Première Chaîne radio network, the station was disaffiliated in 2002. The Canadian Broadcasting Corporation concurrently launched a rebroadcaster of CBF-FM-8 from Trois-Rivières to maintain Première Chaîne service in the region.

== History ==
The station was originally launched on October 3, 1959 by Radio La Tuque Ltée. It had operated at 1240 kHz with 1,000 watts.

=== Switch to FM ===
On May 18, 2012, Radio Haute Mauricie applied to the CRTC to convert CFLM to FM. On September 28, 2012, the CRTC granted the conversion.

In late 2012, CFLM began on-air testing at 97.1 MHz.

The station was acquired by Arsenal Media in 2016.

=== As O 97.1 ===
In May 2019, the station changed from its adult contemporary to a hot adult contemporary/CHR format with its current branding O 97.1.

== Former logos ==
CFLM logo from 2013 (?) to 2019
