= CKRK-FM =

Indigenous radio station in Kahnawake, Mohawk Territory

Coordinates: 45°24′00″N 73°41′23″W

- Kahnawake, Quebec; Canada
- Frequency: 103.7 MHz
- Branding: K1037

Programming
- Format: Community radio/classic hits

Ownership
- Owner: Mohawk Radio Kahnawake Association

History
- First air date: March 30, 1981

Technical information
- Class: A1
- ERP: 250 watts
- HAAT: 50 metres (160 ft)

Links
- Website: www.k1037.com

CKRK-FM is an English-language Canadian radio station located in the Kahnawake Mohawk Territory, a First Nations reserve near Montreal, Quebec. It broadcasts on 103.7 MHz with an effective radiated power of 250 watts (class A1).

CKRK-FM was originally on 103.5 MHz with only 50 watts; it moved to its current frequency and raised its power in 1996, after another station, CJLM-FM, signed on the same channel in Joliette, causing interference.

The station went on the air on March 30, 1981, and identifies itself as "K1037”. Starting in 1995, it moved to an adult contemporary format.

In the fall of 2008, K1037, in conjunction with and with the assistance of the Kahnawake Fire Brigade, held a 55-hour-long Radiothon to raise funds towards the purchase of a new ladder truck for the Brigade.

On April 19, 2010, Montreal radio broadcaster Ted Bird joined the morning show at K1037 after having left CHOM 97-7, his radio home of 25 years. He left CKRK-FM on May 7, 2012 for undisclosed reasons. The following week, Bird returned to the air after signing a two-year contract with CKGM.
