= CJIT-FM =

Radio station in Lac-Mégantic, Quebec

Coordinates: 45°36′27″N 70°58′52″W

- Lac-Mégantic, Quebec; Canada
- Frequency: 106.7 MHz
- Branding: Hit Country 106,7

Programming
- Format: Country radio

Ownership
- Owner: Arsenal Media

History
- First air date: 1968
- Former frequencies: 1340 kHz (1968–1972); 1400 kHz (1972–2000)

Technical information
- Class: A
- ERP: 1.9 kWs average 4.25 kWs peak
- HAAT: 118 metres (387 ft)

Links
- Website: hitcountry.com/hit-country-1067/

CJIT-FM, marketed as Hit Country 106.7, is a Canadian radio station that broadcasts a country radio format on the frequency 106.7 FM in Lac-Mégantic, Quebec.

== History ==
The station originally began broadcasting in 1968 as CKFL broadcasting at 1340 AM, moved to 1400 AM in 1972 and then to its current FM frequency in 2000 as CJIT.

In March 2007, Les Productions du temps perdu inc. received permission to acquire CJIT-FM from 9063-0104 Québec inc., doing business under the name of Radio Gaé-Rit Lac Mégantic. In April 2012, the station was sold to the Montréal-based Attraction Radio group.

On July 6, 2013 the station was knocked temporarily off-air as a result of the Lac-Mégantic derailment which destroyed much of the town centre but did return with coverage of the disaster.

On October 14, 2023, Attraction Media became Arsenal Media and the station reformatted to country radio, joining Arsenal Media's Hit Country group of country radio stations and turning into "Hit Country 106.7".
