= CFTX-FM =

Radio station in Gatineau, Quebec, Canada

Coordinates: 45.46109°N 75.73544°W

- Gatineau, Quebec; Canada
- Broadcast area: National Capital Region
- Frequency: 96.5 MHz (FM)
- Branding: BPM Sports 96.5 Gatineau

Programming
- Language: French
- Format: Sports

Ownership
- Owner: Arsenal Media

History
- First air date: April 13, 2006

Technical information
- Class: A
- ERP: 1,750 watts
- HAAT: 79.3 metres (260 ft)
- Translator: CFTX-FM-1 107.5 MHz Buckingham

Links
- Website: bpmsports.ca

CFTX-FM (96.5 MHz) is a commercial Francophone radio station based in Gatineau, Quebec, Canada. The station broadcasts a French sports format branded as BPM Sports. It is owned by Arsenal Media with radio studios and offices on Jean-Proulx Avenue in Gatineau.

CFTX-FM has an effective radiated power (ERP) of 1,750 watts. The transmitter is on Boulevard St.-Joseph at Rue Bourque, near Quebec Autoroute 5.

== History ==
The station received its approval in 2005. It signed on the air in 2006. The first format was Top 40/CHR, calling itself Tag Radio and later, Tag Radio X, after its sister station in Quebec City, CHOI-FM. The 96.5 FM frequency was formerly occupied by a low-power tourist information radio station, CFDT in Ottawa, which began operations in the early 1990s and was also used in 2002 for a special event radio programming at 96.5 MHz in Gatineau with the callsign CIRC.

Since the station signed on the air in 2006, the station had gone through a number of formats and brandings.

It changed to an alternative rock format as Tag Radio X, in 2009. On July 26, 2010, CFTX flipped to mainstream rock branded as Capitale Rock.

On September 22, 2016, CFTX changed its format to adult hits as Pop 96.5.

On August 12, 2019, CFTX flipped back to Top 40/CHR but retained the "Pop" branding.

In June 2021, the station rebranded as Vibe 96.5; the station shared its branding and airstaff with CHXX-FM in Quebec City. On August 29, 2022, both Vibe stations flipped to sports talk as BPM Sports, networked with Montreal sister station CKLX-FM. However, CFTX and CHXX are licensed as music stations, and CRTC stipulations require at least 50% of their weekly programming to be devoted to music. Pending licence amendments, the stations only simulcast CKLX's weekday and weekend morning programming, do not carry its play-by-play broadcasts (such as CF Montréal), and otherwise continue to carry music programming.

In November 2025, RNC announced the sale all three BPM Sports stations to Arsenal Media pending CRTC approval. The CRTC approved the purchase on July 14, 2026.

== Transmitters ==
Rebroadcasters of CFTX-FM
City of licence	Identifier	Frequency	Power	Class	RECNet	CRTC Decision
Gatineau (Buckingham)	CFTX-FM-1	107.5 FM	250 watts	A1	Query	2005-255

== Former logos ==
Pop 96.5 logo from 2019-2021
