= CJDM-FM =

Radio station in Drummondville

Coordinates: 45°54′44″N 72°30′57″W

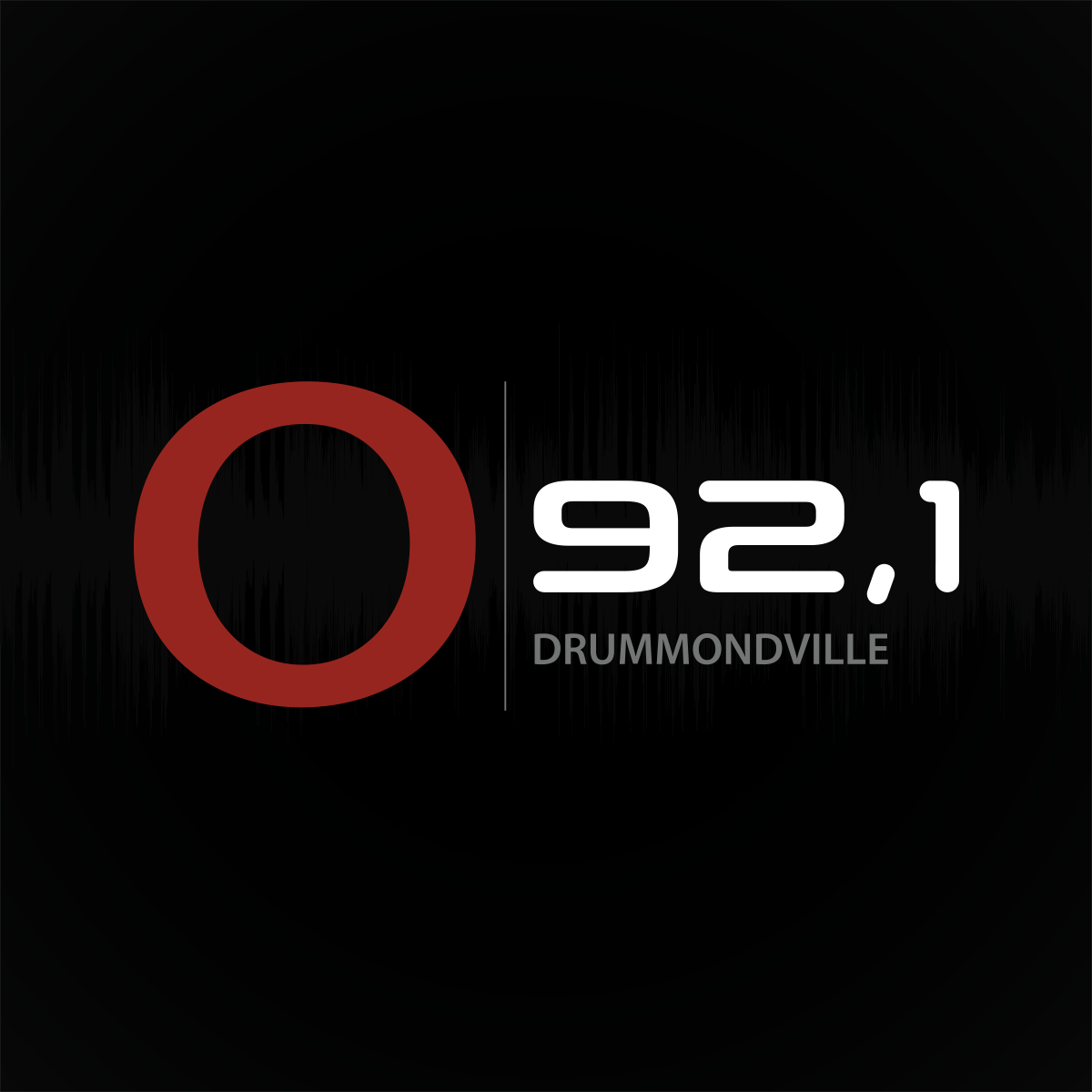
- Drummondville, Quebec; Canada
- Broadcast area: Centre-du-Québec
- Frequency: 92.1 MHz
- Branding: O 92,1

Programming
- Language: French
- Format: Top 40 (CHR)
- Affiliations: Énergie (2005–2025); Drummondville Voltigeurs

Ownership
- Owner: Arsenal Media
- Sister stations: CHRD-FM

History
- First air date: August 15, 1987
- Call sign meaning: DM for Drummondville (broadcast area)

Technical information
- Class: A
- ERP: 3,000 watts
- HAAT: 91 metres (299 ft)

Links
- Webcast: Listen Live
- Website: o921.ca

CJDM-FM (92.1 MHz) is a French-language Canadian radio station located in Drummondville, Quebec. The station has a contemporary hit radio (Top 40) format and is part of the "O" network. It is owned and operated by Arsenal Media, and broadcasts with an effective radiated power of 3,000 watts (class A) using an omnidirectional antenna.

== History ==
The station started operations on August 15, 1987.

Previous CJDM logo using the Énergie branding.

The station was acquired by Corus Entertainment in 2001, and later by Astral Media in 2005, when Astral swapped its AM stations for Corus's smaller FM stations and adopting the "Énergie" branding at the same time. (Énergie was heard from 2001 to 2003 on now-sister station CHRD-FM.) Astral was purchased by Bell Media in 2012.

On February 8, 2024, Bell Media announced a restructuring that included the sale of 45 of its 103 radio stations to seven buyers, including CJDM, which was sold to Arsenal Media. On March 11, 2025 the CRTC approved the sale to Arsenal Media.

Previous CJDM logo using the Énergie branding until 2025.

On April 22, 2025, CJDM was flipped to "O 92,1.
