= CHEQ-FM =

Radio station in Saint-Marie, Quebec

Coordinates: 46°23′24″N 70°59′03″W

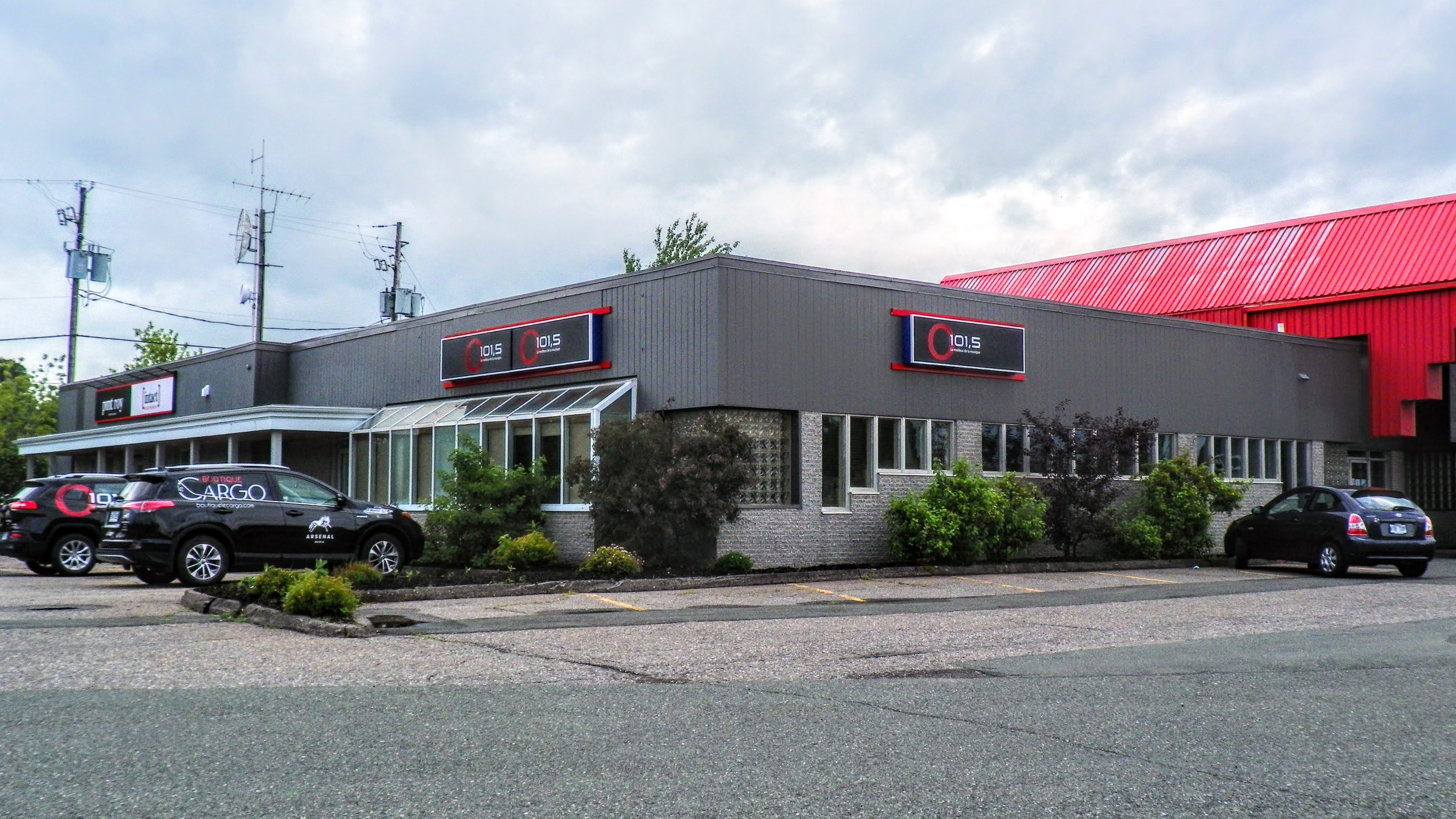
- CHEQ-FM studios

Sainte-Marie, Quebec; Canada
- Frequency: 101.5 MHz
- Branding: O 101,5

Programming
- Language: French
- Format: Adult contemporary

Ownership
- Owner: Arsenal Media
- Sister stations: CHCT-FM

History
- First air date: December 12, 1974
- Former call signs: CJVL (1974–1998)
- Former frequencies: 1360 kHz (1974–1998); 101.3 MHz (1998–2009)

Technical information
- Class: C1
- ERP: 26,000 watts

Links
- Website: www.o1015.ca

CHEQ-FM is a French-language Canadian radio station located in Sainte-Marie, Quebec.

Owned and operated by Arsenal Media (formerly Attraction Radio, which would acquire the station from 9079-3670 Québec inc., an independent private numbered company), it broadcasts on 101.5 MHz with an effective radiated power of 26,000 watts (class C1) using a directional antenna.

The station has an adult contemporary format and it identifies itself as O 101,5. It originally went on the air as an AM station and broadcast on 1360 kHz. The station's original call sign, CJVL, was abandoned when the station moved to FM in 1998; the FM transmitter went on the air at 101.3 FM on November 29, 1998. The call sign CHEQ-FM was previously used by a station in Smiths Falls, Ontario, now known as CKBY-FM.

On August 14, 2008, the licensee proposes to change the frequency of station CHEQ-FM from 101.3 MHz (channel 267A) to 101.5 MHz (channel 268C1). The station received approval on August 19, 2009.

Unknown, the station is owned by Arsenal Media, who owns a number of radio stations in Quebec.

On October 28, 2019, the CRTC approved 10679313 Canada Inc. application to operate a French-language commercial FM radio programming undertaking in Sainte-Marie, Quebec. The station will operate at 105.3 MHz (channel 287A) with an average effective radiated power (ERP) of 1,159 watts (maximum ERP of 4,500 watts with an effective height of antenna above average terrain of 89.3 meters). The call sign for the new 105.3 will be CKAQ-FM which was later changed to CHCT-FM and became a sister station to CHEQ-FM.
