= CHBD-FM =

Radio station in Regina, Saskatchewan

Coordinates: 50°28′58″N 104°30′23″W

- Regina, Saskatchewan; Canada
- Broadcast area: Southern Saskatchewan
- Frequency: 92.7 MHz (FM)
- Branding: Pure Country 92.7

Programming
- Format: Country
- Affiliations: Premiere Networks

Ownership
- Owner: Bell Media; (Bell NewCo)
- Sister stations: CKCK-DT

History
- First air date: February 20, 2008
- Call sign meaning: "Big Dog" (former branding)

Technical information
- Class: C1
- ERP: 100,000 watts
- HAAT: 146.2 metres (480 ft)

Links
- Webcast: Listen Live
- Website: iheartradio.ca/purecountry/regina

CHBD-FM (92.7 MHz) is a radio station in Regina, Saskatchewan. Owned by Bell Media, it broadcasts a country format branded as Pure Country 92.7. Its studios are located at 4303 Albert Street in south Regina.

== History ==
Former logo as Big Dog 92.7.

In May 2007, the CRTC awarded licenses for new radio stations in Regina to Standard Broadcasting (which, the previous month, had agreed to be sold to Astral Media), and Aboriginal Voices Radio. Standard proposed a "new country" station on 92.7 FM.

The station officially launched as Big Dog 92.7 on February 20, 2008, under the ownership of Astral Media. Launch promotions for the new station included a 5,000-song commercial-free marathon, a station-sponsored concert featuring Aaron Pritchett at the local Pump Roadhouse nightclub, and an on-air contest surrounding the Alan Jackson song "Gone Country" (the first song played by the station). It was the first local competitor to the AM country station CKRM (which carries a full service country format that includes agriculture news and sports talk programs).

Astral Media was in turn acquired by Bell Media in 2013, making CHBD-FM a sister station to CTV television station CKCK-DT.

On May 28, 2019, the station was renamed Pure Country 92.7 as part of a nationwide rebranding of all Bell Media country stations.
