= CJMM-FM =

Radio station in Rouyn-Noranda

Coordinates: 48°15′56″N 79°02′04″W

- Rouyn-Noranda, Quebec; Canada
- Broadcast area: Abitibi-Témiscamingue
- Frequency: 99.1 MHz
- Branding: Énergie 99.1-92.5

Programming
- Language: French
- Format: Mainstream rock
- Affiliations: Énergie

Ownership
- Owner: Bell Media; (Bell Media Radio)

History
- First air date: June 17, 1988

Technical information
- Class: A
- ERP: 3,000 watts
- HAAT: 100 metres (330 ft)

Links
- Webcast: Listen Live
- Website: radioenergie.ca/rouyn.html

CJMM-FM is a Canadian radio station, broadcasting at 99.1 FM in Rouyn-Noranda, Quebec and 92.5 FM in La Sarre, Quebec. The station, branded as Énergie 99.1-92.5, airs a francophone mainstream rock format.

The majority of the station's schedule is simulcasted with its sister station in Val-d'Or, CJMV-FM.

CJMM has a community-owned rebroadcaster at the La Grande-1 generating station which broadcasts on the frequency 93.1 FM with the callsign CFAA-FM.

last CJMM logo using the Énergie branding.

Logo under NRJ branding, 2009-2015
