= CJMV-FM =

Radio station in Val-d'Or

Coordinates: 48°25′02″N 77°48′19″W

Val-d'Or, Quebec; Canada
- Broadcast area: Abitibi-Témiscamingue
- Frequency: 102.7 MHz
- Branding: Énergie 102.7

Programming
- Language: French
- Format: Mainstream rock
- Affiliations: Énergie

Ownership
- Owner: Bell Media; (Bell Media Radio)

History
- First air date: June 17, 1988

Technical information
- Class: C
- ERP: 96 kW
- HAAT: 156.8 metres (514 ft)

Links
- Webcast: Listen Live
- Website: radioenergie.ca/val-d-or.html

CJMV-FM is a Canadian radio station, broadcasting at 102.7 FM in Val-d'Or, Quebec. The station, branded as Énergie 102.7, airs a francophone mainstream rock format.

The majority of the station's schedule is simulcasted with its sister station in Rouyn-Noranda, CJMM-FM.

The station opened in Val-d'Or as an FM station in 1988, one of the 30 FM stations that opened in Québec in the 1980s.

== History ==
On July 10 1987, the Canadian Radio-television and Telecommunications Commission approved an application for broadcasting in the region at frequency 102.7 MHz with an effective radiated power of 49,400 watts. In 1988, it was approved to increase effective radiated power to 63,100 watts, and the station signed on the air on June 17, 1988.

The station has been affiliated with IHeartRadio since at least 2016. The genres it broadcasts include Adult contemporary music, Classic hits, Popular music, Rnb, skirt, talk, and top 40.

== Previous logos ==
Last CJMV logo using the Énergie branding.
