= CHOE-FM =

Radio station in Matane, Quebec

Coordinates: 48°49′54″N 67°21′50″W

- Matane, Quebec; Canada
- Frequency: 95.3 FM
- Branding: O 95,3

Programming
- Language: French
- Format: Adult contemporary

Ownership
- Owner: Arsenal Media
- Sister stations: CHRM-FM

History
- First air date: 1990 (approval)

Technical information
- Class: B
- ERP: 14.6 kW
- HAAT: 180.2 metres (591 ft)

Links
- Website: o953.ca

CHOE-FM is a French-language Canadian radio station located in Matane, Quebec.

Owned and operated by Les Communications Matane Inc., until 2016 when it was acquired by Arsenal Media, it broadcasts on 95.3 MHz (FM) using an omnidirectional antenna with an effective radiated power of 14,600 watts (class B).

The station has an adult contemporary format. It is the sister station of CHRM-FM.
