= CJLM-FM =

Radio station in Joliette, Quebec, Canada

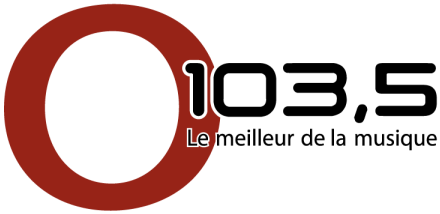

Joliette, Quebec; Canada
- Frequency: 103.5 MHz
- Branding: O103,5

Programming
- Language: French
- Format: Adult contemporary

Ownership
- Owner: Arsenal Media; (8470286 Canada Inc.)

History
- First air date: April 1960
- Former frequencies: 1350 kHz (1960–1996)

Technical information
- Class: A
- ERP: 4.5 kW
- HAAT: 100 metres (330 ft)

Links
- Webcast: O103.5 - CJLM-FM (online stream)
- Website: o1035.ca

CJLM-FM is a French-language Canadian radio station located in Joliette, Quebec, about 40 kilometres (25 miles) northeast of Montreal. The station has an adult contemporary music format and identifies itself as "O103,5" FM. It broadcasts on 103.5 MHz with an effective radiated power of 3,000 watts (class A) using an omnidirectional antenna. The station is owned by Attraction Radio.

CJLM (as it was originally known) opened in April 1960 as an AM station on 1350 kHz, under the ownership of Radio-Richelieu Ltee. as a sister station of CJSO in Sorel. Radio-Richlieu would later sell off CJLM to another broadcaster, Radio de Lanaudière Inc.

Under later owner Diffusion Laurentides Inc., CJLM would relocate to 103.5 FM in 1996, but would soon be sold off in 1997 to "Coopérative de radiodiffusion MF 103,5 de Lanaudière", a cooperative that was created to buy the station after the bankruptcy of Diffusion Laurentides.

In 2013, Attraction Radio (now Arsenal Media) announced plans to acquire CJLM-FM from the cooperative; the decision was given CRTC approval on 30 July 2014.
