= CIKI-FM =

Radio station in Rimouski

Coordinates: 48°27′55″N 68°12′32″W

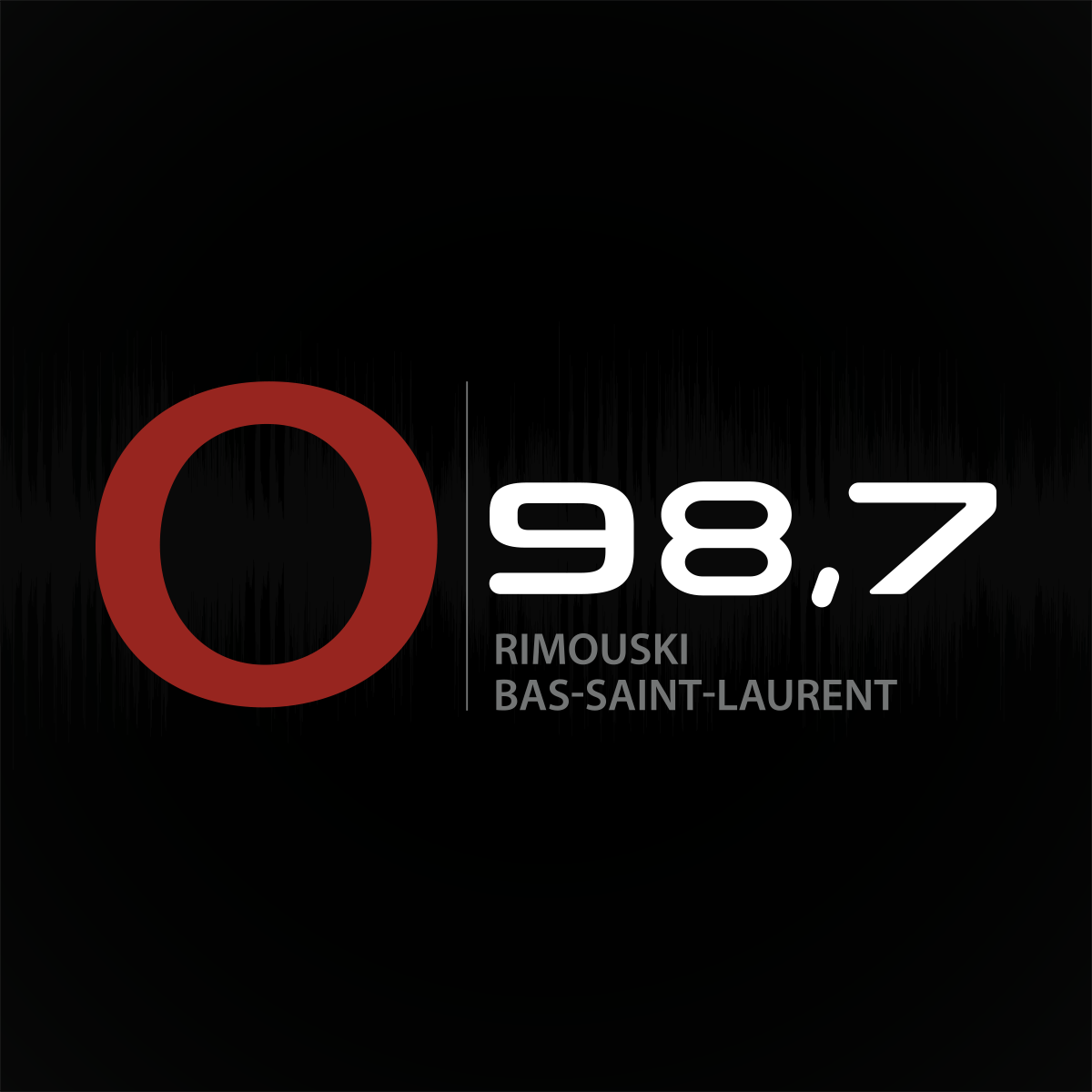
- Rimouski, Quebec; Canada
- Broadcast area: Bas-Saint-Laurent
- Frequency: 98.7 MHz
- Branding: O 98,7

Programming
- Language: French
- Format: Classic rock

Ownership
- Owner: Arsenal Media
- Sister stations: CJOI-FM

History
- First air date: 1988
- Call sign meaning: From "Rimouski"

Technical information
- Class: C
- ERP: 100,000 watts
- HAAT: 435.5 metres (1,429 ft)

Links
- Webcast: Listen Live
- Website: o987.ca

CIKI-FM is a French-language Canadian radio station located in Rimouski, Quebec.

Owned and operated by Arsenal Media, it broadcasts on 98.7 MHz using a directional antenna with an average effective radiated power of 41,300 watts and a peak effective radiated power of 100,000 watts (class C). It also operates a relay, oddly named CIKI-FM-2 (since there is no station or relay with the call sign CIKI-FM-1), in Sainte-Marguerite-Marie, Quebec, near Amqui, on 93.9 MHz using an omnidirectional antenna with an effective radiated power of 750 watts (class A).

Former logo

The station has a mainstream rock format and was part of the "Énergie" network which operates across Quebec. It received CRTC approval in 1986 to broadcast on 104.5 MHz, which was changed to its current frequency at 98.7 FM prior to the station signing on the air. It started operations as a sister station to CFLP (now CJOI-FM 102.9) in 1988.

CIKI logo as NRJ

CIKI initially became part of the Énergie network in 1989, but this affiliation ended in 2001 as then-owner Corus Entertainment ended its agreement with Astral Media (owner of the Énergie network). The station then adopted imaging similar to that of CKOI-FM in Montreal, until the station was, along with four other FM stations, transferred to Astral Media in exchange for six AM stations. Astral Media reintroduced the station in the Énergie network in June 2005, a few weeks after becoming the new owner. The station became part of the new NRJ network in August 2009, with the rest of the Énergie network of stations. Astral was acquired by Bell Media in 2012.

Former logo from 2015 to 2025

On February 8, 2024, Bell announced a restructuring that included the sale of 45 of its 103 radio stations to seven buyers, subject to approval by the CRTC, including CIKI, which was to be sold to Arsenal Media. On March 11, 2025 the CRTC approved the sale to Arsenal Media. On April 22, 2025, CIKI changed affiliations to "O 98,7".
