= CKTF-FM =

Radio station in Gatineau

Coordinates: 45.4349°N 75.7336°W

- Gatineau, Quebec; Canada
- Broadcast area: National Capital Region, Eastern Ontario, Outaouais
- Frequency: 104.1 MHz
- Branding: Énergie 104.1

Programming
- Language: French
- Format: Mainstream rock
- Affiliations: Énergie

Ownership
- Owner: Bell Media; (Bell Media, Inc.)
- Sister stations: CIMF-FM

History
- First air date: March 11, 1988

Technical information
- Class: C1
- ERP: 19,000 watts
- HAAT: 323 metres (1,060 ft)

Links
- Webcast: Listen Live
- Website: radioenergie.ca/gatineau-ottawa.html

CKTF-FM (104.1 MHz) is a French-language Canadian radio station located in Gatineau, Quebec, and broadcasting to the National Capital Region including Ottawa. It is owned by Bell Media and is part of the "Énergie" network, airing a mainstream rock format. Its radio studios and offices are at 215 Boulevard Saint-Joseph.

CKTF-FM has an effective radiated power (ERP) of 19,000 watts as a class C1 FM station. It uses an omnidirectional antenna located in Camp Fortune, in Gatineau Park.

== History ==
Logo under NRJ branding, 2010-2015

After receiving CRTC approval in 1987, it started operations on March 11, 1988 as a sister station to CJRC 104.7 (now owned by Cogeco since February 2011).
