= CFEI-FM =

Radio station in Quebec, Canada

Coordinates: 45.62744°N 72.94574°W

- Saint-Hyacinthe, Quebec; Canada
- Broadcast area: Eastern Suburbs of Montreal
- Frequency: 106.5 MHz
- Branding: O 106,5

Programming
- Language: French
- Format: Classic hits

Ownership
- Owner: Arsenal Media
- Sister stations: CFZZ-FM, CKLX-FM

History
- First air date: March 30, 1988

Technical information
- Licensing authority: CRTC
- Class: A
- Power: 3,000 watts
- HAAT: 99.6 metres (327 ft)

Links
- Website: o1065.ca

CFEI-FM (106.5 MHz) is a French-language Canadian radio station located in Saint-Hyacinthe, Quebec, serving the eastern suburbs of Montreal. Owned and operated by Arsenal Media, it broadcasts with an effective radiated power (ERP) of 3,000 watts (class A) using an omnidirectional antenna.

The station airs a Classic hits format branded as O 106,5.

== History ==
CFEI-FM signed on the air on March 30, 1988. It was a sister station to CKBS 1240 AM, also in Saint-Hyacinthe. The AM station went dark only three years later, leading some observers to believe that the application for a new FM station really was a plan to transfer CKBS to FM by disguised means. At the time AM-to-FM transfers were still uncommon in Canada as such applications were then, unlike now, generally rejected by the CRTC. Astral was acquired by Bell Media in 2012.

Logo as Boom 106,5, used until 2025

On February 8, 2024, Bell announced a restructuring that included the sale of 45 of its 103 radio stations to seven buyers, subject to approval by the CRTC, including CFEI, which was to be sold to Arsenal Media. On March 11, 2025 the CRTC approved the sale to Arsenal Media. On April, 28, 2025 Arsenal Media dropped the Boom FM brand and relaunched the station as O 106,5 with a formal featuring current hits and rock classics. Alongside CKLX-FM after purchasing from RNC Media, the CRTC approved the purchase on July 14, 2026.
