= CHRD-FM =

Radio station in Drummondville

Coordinates: 45°54′44″N 72°30′57″W

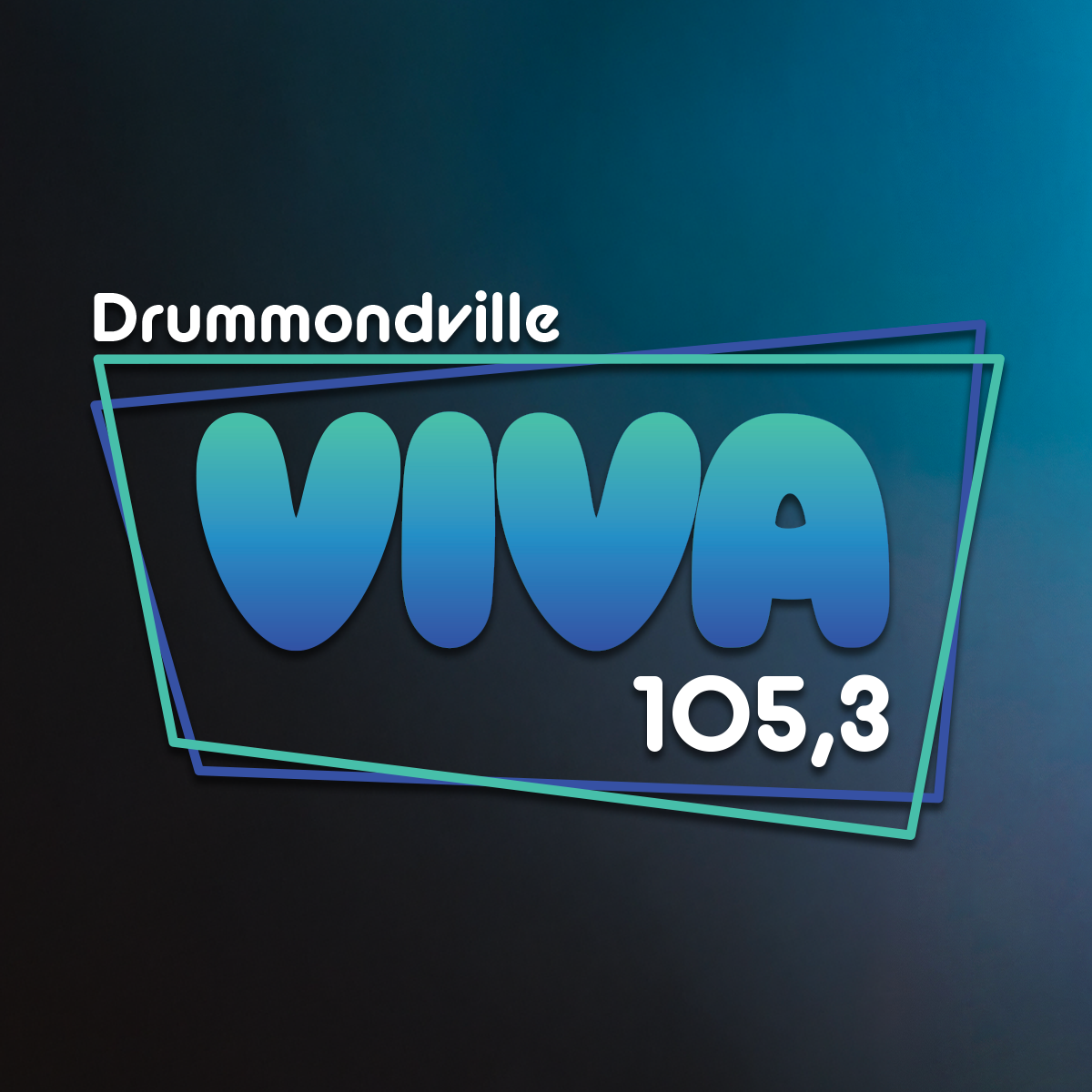

Drummondville, Quebec; Canada
- Frequency: 105.3 MHz
- Branding: Viva 105,3

Programming
- Language: French
- Format: Adult contemporary
- Affiliations: Rouge (2009–2025)

Ownership
- Owner: Arsenal Media
- Sister stations: CJDM-FM

History
- First air date: December 23, 1954
- Former call signs: CHRD (1954–1997)

Technical information
- Class: A
- Power: 5,345 watts
- HAAT: 95.1 metres (312 ft)

Links
- Webcast: Listen Live
- Website: vivadrummondville.com

CHRD-FM (105.3 MHz) is a French-language Canadian radio station in Drummondville, Quebec. It is owned and operated by Arsenal Media and has a directional antenna with an average effective radiated power of 3,257 watts and a peak effective radiated power of 5,345 watts (class A). The station has specialized in adult contemporary format since August 2009 and is part of the "Viva FM" network since 2025.

== History ==
It started out as CHRD 1480 kHz in 1954 and moved to FM in 1997. From about 2001 to 2003, it was part of Astral's CHR network, "Énergie".

It became an oldies station in 2003 as part of Astral's new "Boom" network; this format would last until it became "RockDétente" in 2009.

RockDétente-era logo; used from August 2009 until August 2011

All "RockDétente" stations, including CHRD, were rebranded as Rouge FM on August 18, 2011, at 4:00 p.m. EDT. The last song it played under "RockDétente" was "Pour que tu m'aimes encore" by Celine Dion, which was followed by a "RockDétente" tribute. The first song it played as "Rouge" was "I Gotta Feeling" by the Black Eyed Peas. Astral was acquired by Bell Media in 2012.

On February 8, 2024, Bell Media announced a restructuring that included the sale of 45 of its 103 radio stations to seven buyers, subject to approval by the CRTC, including CHRD, which was to be sold to Arsenal Media. On March 11, 2025 the CRTC approved the sale to Arsenal Media.

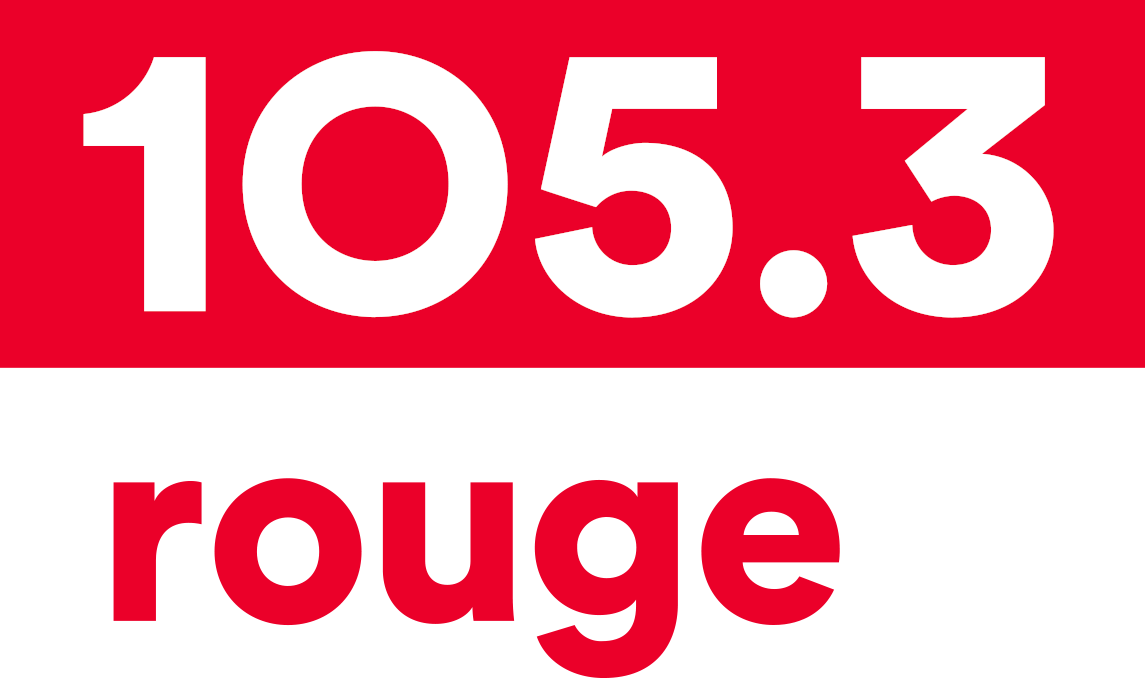
Rouge FM-era logo; used from August 2017 until April 2025

On April 22, 2025, CHRD flipped to "Viva 105,3".
