= CFVM-FM =

Radio station in Amqui

Coordinates: 48°28′41″N 67°34′56″W

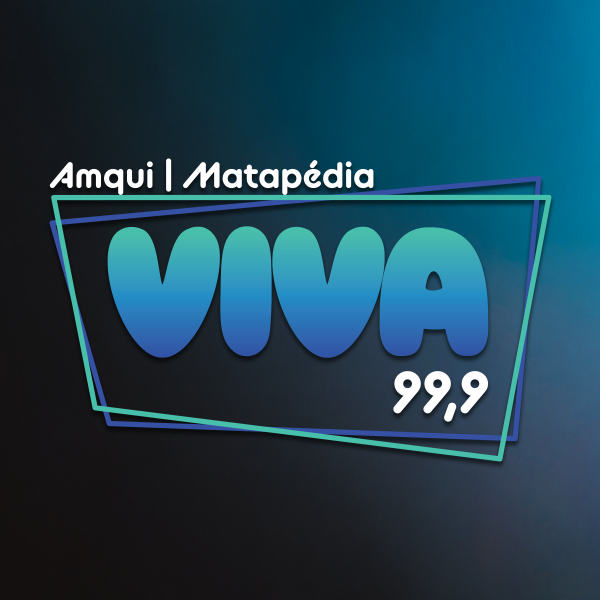

Amqui, Quebec; Canada
- Broadcast area: Matane
- Frequency: 99.9 MHz
- Branding: Viva 99,9

Programming
- Language: French
- Format: Adult contemporary
- Affiliations: Rouge FM (2009–2025)

Ownership
- Owner: Arsenal Media

History
- First air date: March 31, 1980

Technical information
- Class: C1
- ERP: 23.8 kW
- HAAT: 423.4 metres (1,389 ft)

Links
- Webcast: Listen Live
- Website: viva999.ca/

CFVM-FM is a French-language Canadian radio station located in Amqui, Quebec, Canada.

Owned and operated by Arsenal Media, it broadcasts on 99.9 MHz with an effective radiated power of 23,800 watts (class C1) using an omnidirectional antenna.

Previously a station with an oldies format from "Boom" from 2005 to February 2009, the station now has an adult contemporary format and is part of the "Viva" network.

== History ==
RockDétente-era logo; used from February 2009 until August 2011

Originally known as CFVM when it was on 1220 kHz, the station moved to FM in April 2003 after 23 years on AM. The new FM signal also replaced CFVM-1, a short-lived relay in nearby Causapscal which was operational from 1997 to 2003 on 1450 kHz; that facility was previously used by the Canadian Broadcasting Corporation as a relay of what was then CBGA 1250, and is now CBGA-FM 102.1, in Matane.

On August 18, 2011, at 4:00 p.m. EDT, all "RockDétente" stations, including CFVM, rebranded as Rouge FM. The last song under "RockDétente" was "Pour que tu m'aimes encore" by Celine Dion, followed by a tribute of the branding. The first song under "Rouge" was "I Gotta Feeling" by Black Eyed Peas. Astral was acquired by Bell Media in 2012.

Rouge-era logo; used from August 2011 until August 2017

On February 8, 2024, Bell announced a restructuring that included the sale of 45 of its 103 radio stations to seven buyers, subject to approval by the CRTC, including CFVM, which was to be sold to Arsenal Media. On March 11, 2025 the CRTC approved the sale to Arsenal Media.

On April 22, 2025, CFVM dropped Rouge FM and flipped to "Viva 99,9.
