= Arsenal Media =

Canadian radio broadcasting company

Arsenal Media is a broadcasting company based in Saint-Lambert, Quebec, Canada operating 18 radio stations. Through its various antennas, the company is able to reach more than one and a half million potential listeners in Saguenay-Lac-Saint-Jean, Estrie, Centre-du-Québec, Lanaudière, Beauce, Chaudière-Appalaches, Abitibi-Témiscamingue, Haute-Mauricie, Gaspésie/Bas-Saint-Laurent, and Côte-Nord.

== History ==
=== Attraction Radio ===
The company was founded as a subsidiary of Attraction Media in 2011, following the association of Richard Speer (Founding President of Attraction Media) and Sylvain Chamberland. The group's first acquisition was that of the station CHEQ-FM in 2012. The transaction was announced on March 1, 2012 and was authorized by the CRTC on June 8 of the same year. CHEQ General Manager Mario Paquin described the transaction as "the first link in Attraction's radio division" and added that other transactions are to come.

A month and a few days later, the station CJIT-FM located in Lac-Mégantic was acquired from the company Les Productions du temps perdu inc. The transaction was authorized on July 5. Subsequently, two other transactions will follow in Saguenay-Lac-Saint-Jean and thereby finalize the series of transactions of the year 2012: That of CKRS-FM announced on June 18 and authorized on October 12, 2012. and that of CKGS-FM which was announced on September 12 and authorized on December 14.

==== 2013-2014 ====
2013 begin with the announcement of the acquisition of the station CJLM-FM from the Coopérative de radiodiffusion du M103-5 FM. Negotiations to purchase the station began in November 2011 and the agreement was announced on January 23, 2013. The acquisition of assets was approved by the CRTC on July 30, 2014. In 2013, the company officially brought only one station into its fold: CKYQ-FM in Plessisville. The transaction was announced on October 17, 2012, but was authorized by the CRTC on February 13, 2013.

==== 2014-2015 ====
On April 23, 2014, Attraction Radio acquired the Réseau des Appalaches. This network consists of three stations and two rebroadcasters. CRTC authorization arrived on June 19, 2015. On December 2, 2014, Attraction radio announced the conclusion of an affiliation agreement with Cogeco Media for the implementation of the Rythme FM network in Saguenay-Lac-Saint-Jean. The CKRS-FM station was thus set to become a station of the Rythme FM network as of February 9, 2015.

==== 2016 ====
On February 3, 2016, two stations located on the Côte-Nord are acquired: CKCN-FM and CIPC-FM. A few weeks later, on February 22, two other stations entered the company's fold: CHRM-FM and CHOE-FM. These are located in Matane. The transaction between the group and Les Communications Matane was authorized by the CRTC on June 13 of the same year. On April 28, an agreement was reached with Radio Haute-Mauricie Inc. for the purchase of the station CFLM-FM. The station officially became the property of Attraction Radio on October 31 of the same year.

=== Arsenal Media ===
==== 2018 ====
On March 22, 2018, Sylvain Chamberland, vice president and chief operating officer of Attraction Media and president of Attraction Radio, purchased the group's fifteen stations through an agreement. This marks the end of Attraction Media's adventure in the radio world. Conditional on the CRTC's approval of the transaction, a new entity was announced. The latter approved on July 31. The new entity was called Arsenal Media.

On August 13, 2018, the station CKRS-FM, which became CILM-FM, moved under the O banner due to the non-renewal of the affiliation agreement with the Rythme FM network with Cogeco Media.

==== 2019-2020 ====
On August 26, 2019, Arsenal Media announced the acquisition of the station CFVD-FM belonging to Radio Dégélis inc. The CRTC gave its approval on December 11. The group officially became the owner of the station on March 2, 2020.

==== 2021-2022 ====
On May 6, 2021, Arsenal Media announced that it had reached an agreement with Cogeco Media. This agreement meant that Cogeco would become the owner of the CILM-FM station located in Saguenay-Lac-Saint-Jean and Arsenal Media would become the owner of the Capitale Rock (CHGO-FM and CJGO-FM-1) and WOW (CHOA-FM) stations in Abitibi-Témiscamingue. Conditional on CRTC approval, it was approved on March 24, 2022.

On April 25, 2022, the company officially became the owner of stations CHGO-FM, CJGO-FM and CHOA-FM and transferred station CILM-FM to Cogeco Media.

==== 2024-2025 ====
On February 8, 2024, Arsenal Media announced the acquisition, subject to regulatory approval, of seven regional stations owned by Bell Media (CFZZ-FM in Saint-Jean-sur-Richelieu, CFEI-FM in Saint-Hyacinthe, CJDM-FM and CHRD-FM in Drummondville, CJOI-FM and CIKI-FM in Rimouski, and CFVM-FM in Amqui). These stations were being acquired as part of a restructuring at Bell Media. Arsenal intends to disaffiliate the Énergie and Boom stations, which will join the O network, and the Rouge stations, which will join the Plaisir network. The company officially became the owner of the stations on March 11, 2025.

In November 2025, Arsenal Media announced the sale of three BPM Sports radio stations from RNC Media pending CRTC approval. The company officially became the owner of the stations on July 14, 2026. A week later, Arsenal Media announced the sale of CJSQ-FM from owner Charles Gregory and completed the purchase on August 31, 2026.

== Radio stations owned by Arsenal Media ==
Arsenal Media's stations are grouped under one of the company's five banners. Each of its banners has a distinctive brand image and is aimed at diverse audiences. The O brand has a Top 40 musical style. Four stations display the colours of the Plaisir banner intended for an adult audience. Hit Country, a network launched in 2019, broadcasts country music. The WOW FM brand is shared with Cogeco Media. The BPM Sports brand was acquired from RNC Media in July 2026.

=== O ===
- CHOE-FM - 95.3 in Matane
- CHEQ-FM - 101.5 in Sainte-Marie
- CFJO-FM - 97.3 in Victoriaville
- CIPC-FM - 99.1 in Sept-îles and Port-Cartier
- CJLM-FM - 103.5 in Joliette
- CFLM-FM - 97.1 in La Tuque
- CHGO-FM - 104.3 in Val-d'Or
- CJGO-FM - 102.1 in La Sarre and CJGO-FM-1 - 95.7 in Rouyn-Noranda
- CFVD-FM - 95.5 in Dégelis
- CFEI-FM - 106.5 in Saint-Hyacinthe
- CFZZ-FM - 104.1 in Saint-Jean-sur-Richelieu
- CJDM-FM - 92.1 in Drummondville
- CIKI-FM - 98.7 in Rimouski

=== Viva ===
- CHRM-FM - 105.3 in Matane
- CFDA-FM - 101.9 in Victoriaville
- CKLD-FM - 105.5 in Thetford Mines (Rebroadcaster in Disraeli - CJLP-FM)
- CKCN-FM - 94.1 in Sept-Îles
- CHOA-FM - 96.5 in Rouyn-Noranda, CHOA-FM-1 - 103.5 in Val-d'Or and CHOA-FM-2 -103.9 in La Sarre
- CFVM-FM - 99.9 in Amqui
- CHRD-FM - 105.3 in Drummondville
- CJOI-FM - 102.9 in Rimouski

=== Hit Country ===
- CJSQ-FM - 92.7 in Quebec City
- CKGS-FM - 105.5 in La Baie
- CKYQ-FM - 95.7 in Plessisville
- CHCT-FM - 105.3 in Sainte-Marie
- CJIT-FM - 106.7 in Lac-Mégantic

=== BPM Sports ===
- CFTX-FM - 96.5 in Gatineau
- CKLX-FM - 91.9 in Montreal
- CHXX-FM - 100.9 in Quebec City
