= CFZZ-FM =

Radio station in Quebec, Canada

Coordinates: 45°21′23″N 73°8′53″W

- Saint-Jean-sur-Richelieu, Quebec; Canada
- Broadcast area: Greater Montreal
- Frequency: 104.1 MHz
- Branding: O 104,1

Programming
- Language: French
- Format: Classic hits

Ownership
- Owner: Arsenal Media
- Sister stations: CFEI-FM, CKLX-FM

History
- First air date: 1956

Technical information
- Class: B
- ERP: 1,350 watts
- HAAT: 229.5 metres (753 ft)

Links
- Website: o1041.ca

CFZZ-FM is a French-language Canadian radio station located in Saint-Jean-sur-Richelieu, Quebec, and serving Greater Montreal as a rimshot signal. Owned and operated by Arsenal Media, it is part of the "O" network. As such, the station has a Classic hits format.

CFZZ broadcasts on 104.1 MHz with an effective radiated power of 1,350 watts (class B) using an omnidirectional antenna.

== History ==
Originally known as CHRS, the station operated on 1090 kHz as one of the very few daytime-only stations in Canada. Thanks to errors from BBM, CHRS once managed in the 1970s a third-place in ratings during evenings—a time when the station was not even on the air. The station added nighttime service in 1988 when it moved to 1040, While the 1090 kHz frequency remains unused, the 1040 frequency was used from 1999 to 2020 by CJMS 1040 in Saint-Constant, just south of Montreal.

The station switched to FM and adopted its current call sign in 1992, going under the name Z-104, Le Rocker Sympathique. Z was a community radio station with a mainly adult contemporary format.

Power Corporation, which had owned the station since the early 1990s, sold Z-104 to Corus Entertainment in 2000. Ownership of the station changed hands again in 2005, when it was transferred to Astral Media as part of an exchange of assets between Corus and Astral.

Logo as Boom 104,1, used until 2025

Astral Media promptly dropped the "Z" moniker. Community radio programs were abolished and the station was integrated to the "Boom FM" network. Astral was acquired by Bell Media in 2012.

On May 21, 2018, the French-language Boom stations flipped to an adult contemporary format.

On February 8, 2024, Bell announced a restructuring that included the sale of 45 of its 103 radio stations to seven buyers, subject to approval by the CRTC, including CFZZ, which was to be sold to Arsenal Media. On March 11, 2025 the CRTC approved the sale to Arsenal Media. On April, 28, 2025 Arsenal Media dropped the Boom FM brand and relaunched the station as O 104,1 with a formal featuring current hits and rock classics. Alongside CKLX-FM after purchasing from RNC Media, the CRTC approved the purchase on July 14, 2026.
