= CKCN-FM =

Radio station in Sept-Îles, Quebec

Coordinates: 50°08′41″N 66°28′03″W

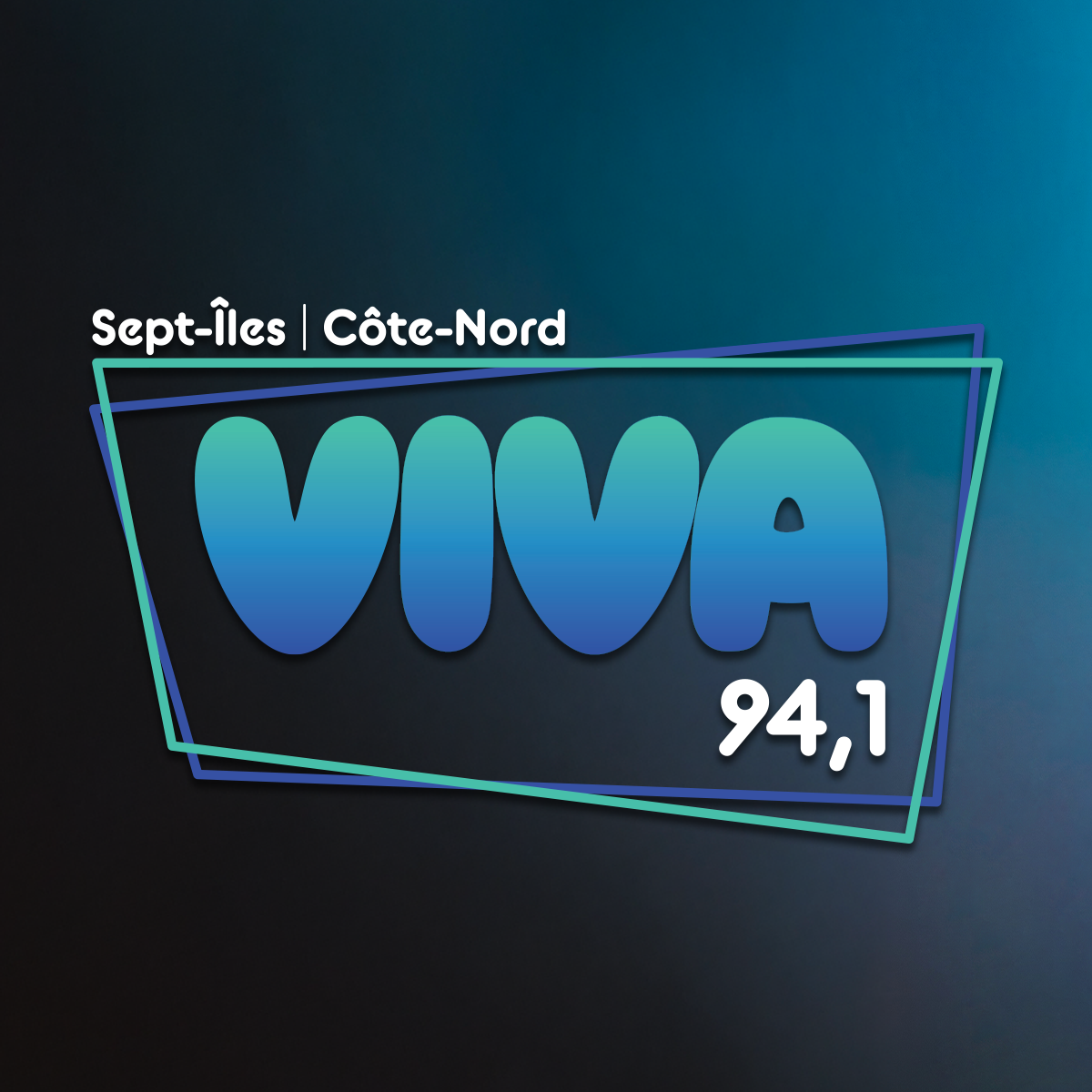

Sept-Îles, Quebec; Canada
- Broadcast area: Côte-Nord
- Frequency: 94.1 MHz
- Branding: Viva 94,1

Programming
- Format: Adult contemporary

Ownership
- Owner: Arsenal Media

History
- First air date: 1963

Technical information
- Class: B
- ERP: 4.88 kws average 11.27 kWs peak
- HAAT: 241 metres (791 ft)

CKCN-FM is a French language Canadian radio station that broadcasts an Adult contemporary format on 94.1 FM in Sept-Îles, Quebec.

Owned by Arsenal Media, the station began operations as an AM station in 1963, broadcasting on 560 kHz, and received CRTC approval to convert to the FM band in 1998.

On October 26, 2012, Médias Nord-Cotiers received CRTC approval to take effective control of CKCN-FM from its previous owner, Radio Sept-Îles.

In 2016, the station was acquired by Attracrion Media, now known as Arsenal Media.
