= CHEY-FM =

Radio station in Trois-Rivières

Coordinates: 46°30′10″N 72°38′13″W

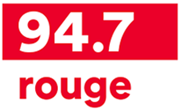
- Trois-Rivières, Quebec; Canada
- Broadcast area: Mauricie
- Frequency: 94.7 MHz
- Branding: 94,7 Rouge

Programming
- Language: French
- Format: Adult contemporary
- Affiliations: Rouge FM

Ownership
- Owner: Bell Media
- Sister stations: CIGB-FM, CFKM-DT

History
- First air date: August 22, 1990

Technical information
- Class: C1
- ERP: 46.6 kW average; 100 kW peak
- HAAT: 249.7 metres (819 ft)

Links
- Webcast: Listen Live
- Website: rougefm.ca/mauricie.html

CHEY-FM is a French-language radio station located in Trois-Rivières, Quebec, Canada.

Owned and operated by Bell Media, it broadcasts on 94.7 MHz using a directional antenna with an average effective radiated power of 20,600 watts and a peak effective radiated power of 100,000 watts (class C1).

The station has an adult contemporary format since its inception, in 1990 and is part of the "Rouge FM" network which operates across Quebec and Eastern Ontario.

== History ==
It started operations in 1990 as a sister station to CHLN radio; that station is now owned by Cogeco.

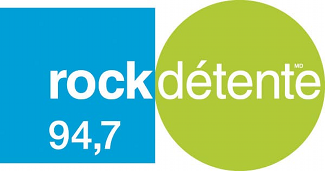
CHEY-FM's last RockDétente-era logo; used from 2004 until August 2011

On August 18, 2011, at 4:00 p.m. EDT, the station ended its longtime 21-year run with the "RockDétente" branding. All "RockDétente" stations, including CHEY, rebranded as Rouge FM. The last song under "RockDétente" was "Pour que tu m'aimes encore" by Celine Dion, followed by a tribute of the branding. The first song under "Rouge" was "I Gotta Feeling" by Black Eyed Peas.
