= CJOI-FM =

Radio station in Rimouski

Coordinates: 48°22′23″N 68°36′09″W

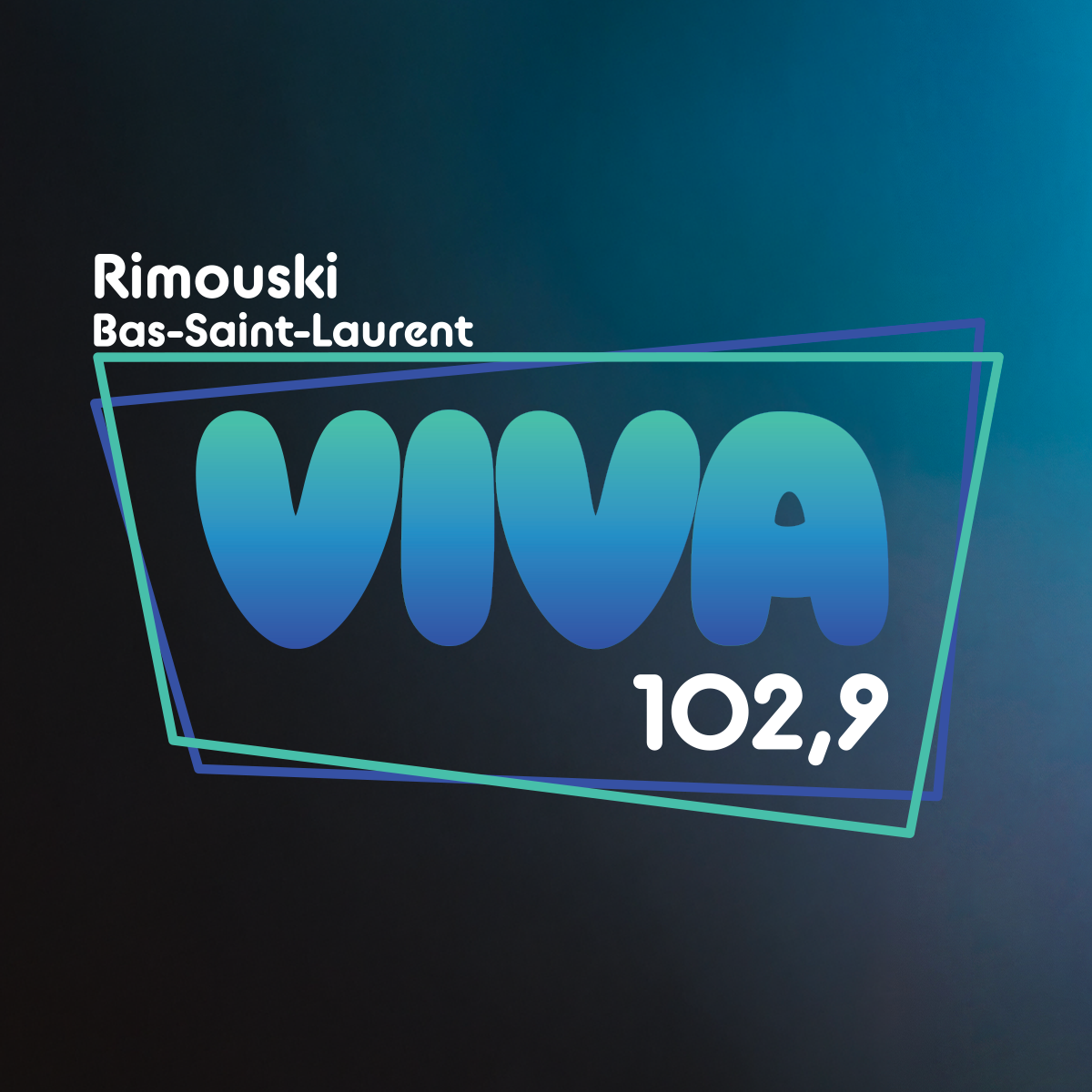
- Rimouski, Quebec; Canada
- Broadcast area: Bas-Saint-Laurent
- Frequency: 102.9 MHz
- Branding: Viva 102,9

Programming
- Language: French
- Format: Adult contemporary
- Affiliations: Rouge FM (2005–2025)

Ownership
- Owner: Arsenal Media
- Sister stations: CIKI-FM

History
- First air date: May 21, 1978

Technical information
- Class: B
- ERP: 33,600 watts

Links
- Webcast: Listen Live
- Website: viva1029.com

CJOI-FM is a French-language Canadian radio station located in Rimouski, Quebec.

Owned and operated by Arsenal Media, it broadcasts on 102.9 MHz with an effective radiated power of 33,600 watts (class B) using an omnidirectional antenna.

The station has an adult contemporary format and is a member of the "Viva FM" network. CJOI was a former member of the "Rouge FM" (formerly RockDétente) network from June 2005 until April 2025, when Bell Media sold CJOI to Arsenal.

== History ==
Originally known as CFLP when it opened in 1978 as an AM station on 1000 kHz (and identified itself as "Radio Mille"), the station moved to the FM band in late 2000, due to serious problems in nighttime coverage resulting from a very directional signal necessary to protect WMVP in Chicago, Illinois. The station switched its call sign when it moved to FM and changed its format from talk to adult contemporary (and abandoned its Radiomédia affiliation).

Former logo for Rouge FM from 2011–2017.

On August 18, 2011, at 4:00 p.m. EDT, all "RockDétente" stations, including CJOI, rebranded as Rouge FM. The last song under "RockDétente" was "Pour que tu m'aimes encore" by Celine Dion, followed by a tribute of the branding. The first song under "Rouge" was "I Gotta Feeling" by Black Eyed Peas. Astral was acquired by Bell Media in 2012.

On February 8, 2024, Bell announced a restructuring that included the sale of 45 of its 103 radio stations to seven buyers, subject to approval by the CRTC, including CJOI, which was to be sold to Arsenal Media. On March 11, 2025 the CRTC approved the sale to Arsenal Media.

On April 22, 2025, CJOI flipped to Viva FM.
