= CIGB-FM =

Radio station in Trois-Rivières

Coordinates: 46°29′24″N 72°39′00″W

- Trois-Rivières, Quebec; Canada
- Broadcast area: Mauricie
- Frequency: 102.3 MHz
- Branding: Énergie 102.3

Programming
- Language: French
- Format: Mainstream rock
- Affiliations: Énergie

Ownership
- Owner: Bell Media
- Sister stations: CHEY-FM, CFKM-DT

History
- First air date: August 27, 1979

Technical information
- Class: B
- ERP: 5,800 watts
- HAAT: 337.8 metres (1,108 ft)

Links
- Webcast: Listen Live
- Website: iheartradio.ca/energie/energie-mauricie

CIGB-FM is a French-language radio station located in Trois-Rivières, Quebec, Canada.

Owned and operated by Bell Media, it broadcasts on 102.3 MHz with an effective radiated power of 5,800 watts (class B) using an omnidirectional antenna.

CIGB's previous logo as an Énergie station.

CIGB's logo as an NRJ station.

The station has a mainstream rock format and is part of the "Énergie" network which operates across Quebec. It started operations on August 27, 1979. CIGB became wholly owned and operated by Radiomutuel (predecessor of Astral Media) in 1987, as the company bought the station, which became a sister station to the now-defunct CJTR (also in Trois-Rivières).
