= Énergie =

Canadian French-language network of mainstream rock radio stations

- Type: Radio network
- Country: Canada
- Headquarters: Montreal, Quebec, Canada

Programming
- Language(s): French
- Format: Mainstream Rock

Ownership
- Owner: Bell Media Radio (Bell Media)

History
- Launch date: 1988
- Former names: NRJ (2009–2015)

Coverage
- Availability: Quebec

Links
- Website: iheartradio.ca/energie

Énergie is a Canadian radio network of French-language mainstream rock outlets broadcasting throughout the province of Quebec and portions of eastern Ontario, in Eastern Canada. They offer a personality-driven mix of francophone and anglophone classic rock and alternative rock songs, catering to a young adult audience. Although the flagship station is CKMF-FM Montreal, the 8 stations in the network usually have their own talent and format for each of their own markets. They are owned by Bell Media.

Most "Énergie" stations broadcast in the same markets as Bell's adult contemporary network Rouge FM.

== History ==
In December 1988, "Énergie" was created.

In 2006, Astral Media programmed a satellite radio channel, branded as Énergie^{2}, for broadcast on Sirius Canada and Sirius Satellite Radio, on channel 89. This channel offered essentially the same format as the terrestrial network, and was hosted by Richard Fortin and Nicolas Wilson. However, the Énergie brand was entirely discarded in September 2010, as Sirius Canada acquired the channel, dropped the English artists and renamed it as Latitude Franco.

On 6 July 2009, Astral Media and European NRJ Group announced a deal to rebrand the Énergie network as NRJ, effective 24 August. (The French pronunciations of "NRJ" and "énergie" are nearly identical.) Astral retained full ownership of the stations.

For the network, the Astral Media IDs usually used Astral's rock jingles from rock stations rather than Astral's jingle packages used on the CHR stations such as CIBK-FM in Calgary or CHSU-FM in Kelowna.

On 17 August 2015, the network announced that it would rebrand itself back as Énergie, starting on 24 August and airs mainstream rock format today.

== Identity ==
=== Logos ===
Old Énergie^{2} logo from 2006 until 2010. Before available on Sirius.

Previous logo of énergie from 2001 until 2009.

Previous logo of NRJ from 2009 until 2010.

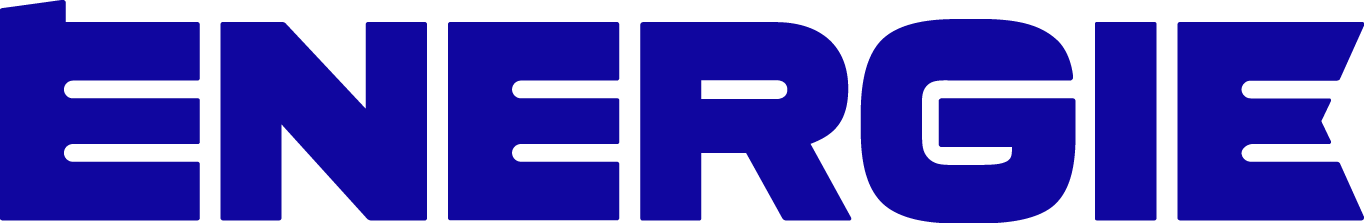
Énergie logo since 2015 to present

=== Slogans ===
- Pre-2009: Monte le son
- 2009–2011: Méchante radio (primary)
- 2009–2011: Des hits qui arrachent (secondary)
- 2011–2012: La radio des hits
- 2012–2015 : La radio de tous les hits
- 2015–2017 : Toujours en tête
- 2017–2019 : Les + gros hits
- 2019-present : Plus de classiques. Plus de fun.

== Stations ==
Station ID	Frequency	City
CHIK-FM	98.9	Quebec City
CIGB-FM	102.3	Trois-Rivières
CIMO-FM	106.1	Sherbrooke
CJAB-FM	94.5	Saguenay
CJMM-FM	99.1	Rouyn-Noranda
CJMV-FM	102.7	Val-d'Or
CKMF-FM	94.3	Montreal
CKTF-FM	104.1	Gatineau/Ottawa

== See also ==
- List of radio stations in Quebec
