= List of radio stations in Quebec =

The following is a list of radio stations in the Canadian province of Quebec, as of 2025.

== List of radio stations ==
AM/FM

Call sign	Frequency	City of Licence	Owner	Format
VF8007	90.1 FM	Acton Vale	Paroisse Saint-André	Christian radio (French)
CFID-FM	103.7 FM	Acton Vale	Radio Acton	community radio (French)
CBSI-FM-14	105.9 FM	Aguanish	Ici Radio-Canada Première	public news/talk (French)
VF2445	94.1 FM	Akulivik	Taqramiut Nipingat	community radio (Inuktitut)
CKYK-FM	95.7 FM	Alma	Cogeco	modern rock (French)
CKYK-FM-1	96.3 FM	Alma	Cogeco	modern rock (French)
CFGT-FM	104.5 FM	Alma	Cogeco	adult contemporary (French)
CBFX-FM-3	88.3 FM	Amos	Ici Musique	public music (French)
CHLM-FM-1	91.5 FM	Amos	Ici Radio-Canada Première	public news/talk (French)
CHOA-FM-1	103.5 FM	Amos	Cogeco	adult contemporary (French)
CHGO-FM	104.3 FM	Amos	Cogeco	modern rock (French)
CHOW-FM	105.3 FM	Amos	Radio Boréale	community radio (French)
CFVM-FM	99.9 FM	Amqui	Bell Media Radio (Rouge FM)	soft adult contemporary (French)
CFIN-FM-1	103.9 FM	Armagh	Radio Bellechasse	community radio
VF2434	94.1 FM	Aupaluk	Taqramiut Nipingat	community radio (Inuktitut)
CBMI-FM	93.7 FM	Baie-Comeau	CBC Radio One	public news/talk
CHLC-FM	97.1 FM	Baie-Comeau	9022-6242 Québec inc.	hot adult contemporary
CBSI-FM-24	106.1 FM	Baie-Comeau	Ici Radio-Canada Première	public news/talk (French)
CBVX-FM-3	88.9 FM	Baie-Saint-Paul	Ici Musique	public music (French)
CIHO-FM-2	92.1 FM	Baie-Saint-Paul	Radio MF Charlevoix	community radio (French)
CHOX-FM-1	94.1 FM	Baie-Saint-Paul	Groupe Radio Simard	hot adult contemporary (French)
CION-FM-1	102.5 FM	Beauceville	Radio-Galilée	Christian radio (French)
CKBN-FM	90.5 FM	Bécancour	Coopérative de solidarité radio communautaire Nicolet-Yamaska/Bécancour	community radio
CFBS-FM	89.9 FM	Blanc-Sablon	Radio Blanc-Sablon	community radio
CBMS-FM	102.7 FM	Blanc-Sablon	CBC Radio One	public news/talk
CBSI-FM-21	107.1 FM	Blanc-Sablon	Ici Radio-Canada Première	public news/talk (French)
CJVI-FM	102.7 FM	Brownsburg-Chatham	Aujourd’hui l’Espoir	Christian radio (French)
CHAI-FM-1	101.9 FM	Candiac	Radio communautaire de Châteauguay	community radio (French)
CIEU-FM	94.9 FM	Carleton-sur-Mer	Diffusion communautaire Baie-des-Chaleurs	community radio (French)
CHNC-FM-1	99.1 FM	Carleton-sur-Mer	Radio CHNC	adult contemporary (French)
CIHA-FM	92.3 FM	Champion	Club Social du Nord-Est	community-owned rebroadcaster of CITE-FM Montreal
CIHQ-FM	93.1 FM	Champion	Club Social du Nord-Est	community-owned rebroadcaster of CKAC Montreal
CBGA-FM-16	93.3 FM	Chandler	Ici Radio-Canada Première	public news/talk (French)
CFMV-FM	96.3 FM	Chandler	Radio du Golfe	adult contemporary (French)
CHNC-FM-2	98.1 FM	Chandler	Radio CHNC	adult contemporary (French)
CBVB-FM	103.7 FM	Chandler	CBC Radio One	public news/talk
CHAI-FM	101.9 FM	Châteauguay	Radio communautaire de Châteauguay	community radio (French)
CBVC-FM	90.3 FM	Chibougamau	CBC Radio One	public news/talk
CBJ-FM-1	91.9 FM	Chibougamau	Ici Radio-Canada Première	public news/talk (French)
CKXO-FM	93.5 FM	Chibougamau	Cogeco	adult contemporary (French)
CHFG-FM	101.1 FM	Chisasibi	Chisasibi Telecommunications Association	First Nations community radio
CBFG-FM	103.5 FM	Chisasibi	Ici Radio-Canada Première/CBC North	public news/talk (French)
CBMP-FM	105.1 FM	Chisasibi	CBC Radio One	public news/talk
CJRG-FM-7	98.9 FM	Cloridorme	Radio du Golfe	community radio (English)
CJMC-FM-6	103.1 FM	Cloridorme	Radio du Golfe	adult contemporary (French)
CBGA-FM-9	105.1 FM	Cloridorme	Ici Radio-Canada Première	public news/talk (French)
CIGN-FM	96.7 FM	Coaticook	Radio coopérative de Coaticook, Coop de solidarité	community radio (French)
CILA-FM	88.1 FM	Cookshire-Eaton	Fabrique de la Paroisse Saint-Camille-de-Cookshire	Christian radio (French)
CBMU-FM	95.5 FM	Côte-Nord-du-Golfe-du-Saint-Laurent	CBC Radio One	public news/talk
CFTH-FM-1	97.7 FM	Côte-Nord-du-Golfe-du-Saint-Laurent	Radio communautaire de Harrington Harbour	community radio (English)
CBSI-FM-15	100.5 FM	Côte-Nord-du-Golfe-du-Saint-Laurent	Ici Radio-Canada Première	public news/talk (French)
CBMG-FM	101.9 FM	Cowansville	CBC Radio One	public news/talk
VF8022	106.5 FM	Crabtree	Fabrique de la Paroisse du Sacré-Coeur	Christian radio (French)
CFVD-FM	95.5 FM	Dégelis	Radio Dégelis	hot adult contemporary (French)
CJLP-FM	107.1 FM	Disraeli	Réseau des Appalaches	a of CKLD Thetford Mines
CBJ-FM-3	93.1 FM	Dolbeau-Mistassini	Ici Radio-Canada Première	public news/talk (French)
CHVD-FM	100.3 FM	Dolbeau-Mistassini	Cogeco	adult contemporary (French)
CKII-FM	101.3 FM	Dolbeau-Mistassini	Société d’information Lac-St-Jean	First Nations community radio
CHXX-FM	100.9 FM	Donnacona	RNC Media	adult hits (French)
CJDM-FM	92.1 FM	Drummondville	Bell Media Radio (Énergie)	contemporary hit radio (French)
CHRD-FM	105.3 FM	Drummondville	Bell Media Radio (Rouge FM)	soft adult contemporary (French)
CFGA-FM	92.1 FM	Eeyou Istchee Baie-James	Club Social du Nord-Est	community-owned rebroadcaster of CKAC Montreal
CFCC-FM	92.1 FM	Eeyou Istchee Baie-James	Club Social du Nord-Est	community-owned rebroadcaster of CKAC Montreal
CFAA-FM	93.1 FM	Eeyou Istchee Baie-James	Club Social du Nord-Est	community-owned rebroadcaster of CJMM-FM Rouyn-Noranda
CFBD-FM	93.1 FM	Eeyou Istchee Baie-James	Club Social du Nord-Est	community-owned rebroadcaster of CKAC Montreal
CFDD-FM	93.1 FM	Eeyou-Istchee-Baie-James	Club Social du Nord-Est	community-owned rebroadcaster of CKAC Montreal
CFGD-FM	94.9 FM	Eeyou Istchee Baie-James	Club Social du Nord-Est	community-owned rebroadcaster of CITE-FM Montreal
CFCE-FM	98.5 FM	Eeyou Istchee Baie-James	Club Social du Nord-Est	community-owned rebroadcaster of CITE-FM Montreal
CFBE-FM	99.5 FM	Eeyou Istchee Baie-James	Club Social du Nord-Est	community-owned rebroadcaster of CITE-FM Montreal
CFDE-FM	100.1 FM	Eeyou-Istchee-Baie-James	Club Social du Nord-Est	community-owned rebroadcaster of CITE-FM Montreal
CFAE-FM	101.7 FM	Eeyou Istchee Baie-James	Club Social du Nord-Est	community-owned rebroadcaster of CKAC Montreal
CFAF-FM	106.1 FM	Eeyou Istchee Baie-James	Club Social du Nord-Est	community-owned rebroadcaster of CITE-FM Montreal
CBGA-FM-20	92.3 FM	Escuminac	Ici Radio-Canada Première	public news/talk (French)
CBVA-FM	98.1 FM	Escuminac	CBC Radio One	public news/talk
CBSI-FM-6	100.5 FM	Fermont	Ici Radio-Canada Première	public news/talk (French)
CFMF-FM	103.1 FM	Fermont	La Radio communautaire de Fermont	community radio (French)
CBMR-FM	105.1 FM	Fermont	CBC Radio One	public news/talk
CHME-FM-3	99.7 FM	Forestville	Radio Essipit Haute-Côte-Nord	First Nations community radio
CFRP-FM	100.5 FM	Forestville	9022-6242 Québec inc.	hot adult contemporary
CHIP-FM	101.9 FM	Fort-Coulonge	Radio communautaire de Pontiac	community radio (French)
CHGM-FM	99.3 FM	Gaspé	Radio CHNC	adult contemporary (French)
CBVG-FM	88.5 FM	Gaspé	CBC Radio One	public news/talk
CJRG-FM	94.5 FM	Gaspé	Radio Gaspésie	community radio (French)
CJRG-FM-2	97.3 FM	Gaspé	Radio Gaspésie	community radio (English)
CJRV-FM	95.3 FM	Gaspé	Radio Gaspésie	community radio (English)
CBGA-FM-15	101.5 FM	Gaspé	Ici Radio-Canada Première	public news/talk (French)
CJEU (AM)	1670 AM	Gatineau	Fondation Radio-Enfant	children's community radio (French)
VF8012	92.3 FM	Gatineau	Fabrique de la Paroisse Saint-Joseph de Hull	Christian radio (French)
CIMF-FM	94.9 FM	Gatineau	Bell Media Radio (Rouge FM)	soft adult contemporary (French)
CFTX-FM	96.5 FM	Gatineau	RNC Media	contemporary hit radio (French)
CHLX-FM	97.1 FM	Gatineau	RNC Media	adult contemporary (French)
CKTF-FM	104.1 FM	Gatineau	Bell Media Radio (Énergie)	mainstream rock (French)
CKOF-FM	104.7 FM	Gatineau	Cogeco	talk (French)
CFTX-FM-1	107.5 FM	Gatineau	RNC Media	contemporary hit radio (French)
CHRG-FM	101.7 FM	Gesgapegiag	Douglas Martin	First Nations community radio
CFXM-FM	104.9 FM	Granby	Coopérative de travail de la radio de Granby	community radio (French)
CJMC-FM-4	92.7 FM	Grande-Vallée	Radio du Golfe	adult contemporary (French)
CJRG-FM-5	98.5 FM	Grande-Vallée	Radio Gaspésie	community radio (English)
CBGA-FM-14	104.1 FM	Grande-Vallée	Ici Radio-Canada Première	public news/talk (French)
CBSI-FM-7	92.5 FM	Havre-Saint-Pierre	Ici Radio-Canada Première	public news/talk (French)
CILE-FM	95.1 FM	Havre-Saint-Pierre	Radio-Télévision communautaire Havre-Saint-Pierre	community radio
CILE-FM-1	97.7 FM	Havre-Saint-Pierre	Radio-Télévision communautaire Havre-Saint-Pierre	community radio
VF2149	99.7 FM	Havre-Saint-Pierre	Radio-Télévision communautaire Havre-Saint-Pierre	community radio
VF2013	104.7 FM	Havre-Saint-Pierre	Radio-Télévision communautaire Havre-Saint-Pierre	community radio
VF2441	94.1 FM	Inukjuak	Taqramiut Nipingat	community radio (Inuktitut)
CINY-FM	97.9 FM	Inukjuak	Natturaliit Youth Committee	community radio (Inuktitut)
VF2447	94.1 FM	Ivujivik	Taqramiut Nipingat	community radio (Inuktitut)
CJLM-FM	103.5 FM	Joliette	10679313 Canada inc. (Arsenal Média)	adult contemporary (French)
CJOL-FM	107.9 FM	Joliette	Arsenal Média	country (approved May 27, 2024; airdate to be announced)
CKKI-FM	89.9 FM	Kahnawake	Brian Moon	country
CKRK-FM	103.7 FM	Kahnawake	Mohawk Radio Kahnawake Association	First Nations community radio
VF2281	89.9 FM	Kangiqsualujjuaq	Jim Stewart	community radio (Inuktitut)
CFGR-FM	92.1 FM	Kangiqsualujjuaq	Jim Stewart	First Nations community radio (Inuktitut)
VF2443	94.1 FM	Kangiqsualujjuaq	Taqramiut Nipingat	community radio (Inuktitut)
VF2436	94.1 FM	Kangiqsujuaq	Taqramiut Nipingat	community radio (Inuktitut)
VF2437	94.1 FM	Kangirsuk	Taqramiut Nipingat	community radio (Inuktitut)
VF2348	88.5 FM	Kattiniq	Société minière Raglan du Québec	community-owned rebroadcaster of CITE-FM Montreal
VF2402	93.5 FM	Kattiniq	Société minière Raglan du Québec	community-owned rebroadcaster of CFFB Iqaluit
CJCK-FM	89.9 FM	Kawawachikamach	Naskapi Northern Wind Radio	First Nations community radio
CFTH-FM-3	89.9 FM	Kegaska	Radio communautaire de Harrington Harbour	community radio (English)
VF2403	98.5 FM	Kilometre 38	Société minière Raglan du Québec	community-owned rebroadcaster of CITE-FM Montreal
CKFF-FM	104.1 FM	Kipawa	Kebaowek First Nation	First Nations community radio
VF2439	94.1 FM	Kuujjuaq	Taqramiut Nipingat	community radio (Inuktitut)
CKUJ-FM	97.3 FM	Kuujjuaq	Société Kuujjuamiut	community radio (Inuktitut)
VF2321	98.3 FM	Kuujjuaq	Société Kuujjuamiut	community radio (Inuktitut)
CBFG-FM-1	105.1 FM	Kuujjuaq	Ici Radio-Canada Première/CBC North	public news/talk (French)
VF2438	94.1 FM	Kuujjuarapik	Taqramiut Nipingat	community radio (Inuktitut)
CBFG-FM-2	105.1 FM	Kuujjuarapik	Ici Radio-Canada Première/CBC North	public news/talk (French)
CBJ-FM-4	101.9 FM	L'Anse-Saint-Jean	Ici Radio-Canada Première	public news/talk (French)
CBOF-FM-9	88.7 FM	L'Isle-aux-Allumettes	Ici Radio-Canada Première	public news/talk (French)
VF8017	104.7 FM	L'Assomption	Fabrique de la Paroisse L'Assomption	Christian radio (French)
VF8003	92.7 FM	La Guadeloupe	Fabrique de la Paroisse Notre-Dame de la Guadeloupe	Christian radio (French)
CJMC-FM-1	92.7 FM	La Martre	Radio du Golfe	adult contemporary (French)
CBF-FM-16	95.1 FM	La Tuque	Ici Radio-Canada Première	public news/talk (French)
CBGA-FM-4	97.5 FM	Lac-au-Saumon	Ici Radio-Canada Première	public news/talk (French)
CIDI-FM	99.1 FM	Lac-Brome	Radio communautaire Missisquoi	community radio (English)
VF2383	89.9 FM	Lac-Cauvet	AbitibiBowater	community-owned rebroadcaster of CKOI-FM Montreal
CBF-FM-17	99.9 FM	Lac-Édouard	Ici Radio-Canada Première	public news/talk (French)
CFIN-FM	100.5 FM	Lac-Etchemin	Radio Bellechasse	community radio
CBF-FM-6	91.3 FM	Lac-Mégantic	Ici Radio-Canada Première	public news/talk (French)
CFJO-FM-1	101.7 FM	Lac-Mégantic	Réseau des Appalaches	contemporary hit radio (French)
CJIT-FM	106.7 FM	Lac-Mégantic	Arsenal Media	country radio (French)
CHUT-FM	95.3 FM	Lac-Simon	La Radio communautaire MF Lac-Simon	First Nations community radio
CJLA-FM	104.9 FM	Lachute	Cogeco	adult contemporary (French)
CFFA-FM	100.7 FM	Laforge-2 generating station	Club Social du Nord-Est	community-owned rebroadcaster of CITE-FM Montreal
CFFD-FM	103.9 FM	Laforge-2 generating station	Club Social du Nord-Est	community-owned rebroadcaster of CKAC Montreal
CJLV	1570 AM	Laval	Radio Humsafar Inc.	oldies (French)
CFGL-FM	105.7 FM	Laval	Cogeco (Rythme FM)	adult contemporary (French)
CBMK-FM	92.7 FM	Lebel-sur-Quévillon	CBC Radio One	public news/talk
CBF-FM-3	94.9 FM	Lebel-sur-Quévillon	Ici Radio-Canada Première	public news/talk (French)
CHEF-FM-3	96.9 FM	Lebel-sur-Quévillon	Radio Matagami	community radio (French)
CKCJ-FM	97.9 FM	Lebel-sur-Quévillon	Le son du 49e	community radio (French)
CHME-FM	94.9 FM	Les Escoumins	Radio Essipit Haute-Côte-Nord	First Nations community radio
CFIM-FM	92.7 FM	Les Îles-de-la-Madeleine	Diffusion communautaire des Îles	community radio (French)
CBGA-FM-8	93.5 FM	Les Îles-de-la-Madeleine	Ici Radio-Canada Première	public news/talk (French)
CBVM-FM	95.3 FM	Les Îles-de-la-Madeleine	CBC Radio One	public news/talk
CJMD-FM	96.9 FM	Lévis	Radio communautaire de Lévis	community radio (French)
CFEL-FM	102.1 FM	Lévis	Leclerc Communication Inc. (CKOI)	alternative rock (French)
CFOM-FM	102.9 FM	Lévis	Cogeco (Souvenirs Garantis)	hot adult contemporary (French)
CFIC-FM	105.1 FM	Listuguj	Micmac Historical Cultural Art Society	country
CHRQ-FM	106.9 FM	Listuguj	Gespegewag Communications Society	First Nations community radio
CHMP-FM	98.5 FM	Longueuil	Cogeco	talk (French)
CHAA-FM	103.3 FM	Longueuil	La Radio communautaire de la Rive-Sud	community radio (French)
CHXX-FM-1	105.5 FM	Lotbinière	RNC Media	adult hits (French)
VF8002	90.9 FM	Louiseville	Paroisse Saint-Antoine-de-Padoue	Christian radio (French)
CHHO-FM	103.1 FM	Louiseville	Coop de solidarité radio communautaire de la MRC de Maskinongé	community radio (French)
CFGE-FM-1	98.1 FM	Magog	Cogeco (Rythme FM)	adult contemporary (French)
CIMO-FM	106.1 FM	Magog	Bell Media Radio (Énergie)	active rock (French)
CBVX-FM-2	91.5 FM	La Malbaie	Ici Musique	public music (French)
CBV-FM-6	99.3 FM	La Malbaie	Ici Radio-Canada Première	public news/talk (French)
CIHO-FM-1	105.9 FM	La Malbaie	Radio MF Charlevoix	community radio (French)
CBMN-FM	101.1 FM	Malartic/Val-d'Or	CBC Radio One	public news/talk
CKAU-FM	104.5 FM	Maliotenam	Corporation de Radio Kushapetsheken Apetuamiss Uashat	First Nations community radio
CHMK-FM	93.1 FM	Manawan	Corporation Radio Attikamek de Manawan	First Nations community radio
CBFA-FM-1	103.5 FM	Manawan	Ici Radio-Canada Première/CBC North	public news/talk (French)
CBOM-FM	93.3 FM	Maniwaki	CBC Radio One	public news/talk
CBOF-FM-1	94.3 FM	Maniwaki	Ici Radio-Canada Première	public news/talk (French)
CHGA-FM	97.3 FM	Maniwaki	Radio communautaire FM de la Haute-Gatineau	community radio (French)
CFOR-FM	99.3 FM	Maniwaki	9116-1299 Québec	active rock
CKWE-FM	103.9 FM	Maniwaki	Jean-Guy Whiteduck	First Nations community radio
CBGA-FM-12	89.3 FM	Marsoui	Ici Radio-Canada Première	public news/talk (French)
CHUK-FM	107.3 FM	Mashteuiatsh	Corporation Médiatique Teuehikan	First Nations community radio
CHEF-FM	99.9 FM	Matagami	Radio Matagami	community radio (French)
CHOE-FM	95.3 FM	Matane	Arsenal Média	Réseau O (Top 40) (French)
CBF-FM-4	97.7 FM	Matagami	Ici Radio-Canada Première	public news/talk (French)
CBGA-FM	102.1 FM	Matane	Ici Radio-Canada Première	public news/talk (French)
CHRM-FM	105.3 FM	Matane	Les Communications Matane	adult contemporary (French)
CBRX-FM-1	107.5 FM	Matane	Ici Musique	public music (French)
CBGA-FM-21	101.7 FM	Matapédia	Ici Radio-Canada Première	public news/talk (French)
CHRM-FM-1	91.3 FM	Les Méchins	Les Communications Matane	adult contemporary (French)
CJMC-FM-3	103.1 FM	Les Méchins	Radio du Golfe	adult contemporary (French)
CFBS-FM-1	93.1 FM	Middle Bay	Radio Blanc-Sablon	community radio
CKKE-FM	89.9 FM	Mingan	Corporation de Radio montagnaise de Mingan	First Nations community radio
CINI-FM	95.3 FM	Mistissini	CINI Radio FM	First Nations community radio
CBFM-FM	100.7 FM	Mistassini Station	Ici Radio-Canada Première/CBC North	public news/talk (French)
CBVS-FM	101.5 FM	Mistassini Station	CBC Radio One	public news/talk
CBFX-FM-6	91.1 FM	Mont-Laurier	Ici Musique	public music (French)
CBF-FM-9	91.9 FM	Mont-Laurier	Ici Radio-Canada Première	public news/talk (French)
CFLO-FM	104.7 FM	Mont-Laurier	Sonème inc.	full service
CJMC-FM-2	92.7 FM	Mont-Louis	Radio du Golfe	adult contemporary (French)
CBGA-FM-11	106.1 FM	Mont-Louis	Ici Radio-Canada Première	public news/talk (French)
CIQI-FM	90.3 FM	Montmagny	Groupe Radio Simard	hot adult contemporary (French)
VF8014	91.5 FM	Montmagny	Fabrique de la Paroisse de St-Mathieu	Christian radio (French)
CFQR	600 AM	Montreal	7954689 Canada Inc. TTP Media	news/talk (English)
CKGM	690 AM	Montreal	Bell Media Radio	sports (English)
CKAC	730 AM	Montreal	Cogeco	traffic information (French)
CJAD	800 AM	Montreal	Bell Media Radio	news/talk (English)
CFNV	940 AM	Montreal	7954689 Canada Inc.	news/talk (French)
CFMB	1280 AM	Montreal	CFMB Ltd.	multilingual
CJWI	1410 AM	Montreal	Jean-Ernest Pierre	multilingual (French)
CHOU	1450 AM; 104.5 FM	Montreal	Radio Moyen-Orient	multilingual
CHRN	1610 AM	Montreal	Radio Humsafar Inc.	multilingual
CKZW	1650 AM	Montreal	Radio Shalom	Jewish community radio
CJLO	1690 AM	Montreal	Concordia University	campus radio
CHDO-FM	88.1 FM	Montreal	Aéroports de Montréal	Montréal-Pierre Elliott Trudeau International Airport tourist information
CBME-FM	88.5 FM	Montreal	CBC Radio One	public news/talk
CISM-FM	89.3 FM	Montreal	Université de Montréal	campus radio
CKUT-FM	90.3 FM	Montreal	McGill University	campus radio
CJPB-FM	90.7 FM	Montreal	Centre communautaire "Bon Courage" de Place Benoît	community radio (French)
CIRA-FM	91.3 FM	Montreal	Radio Ville-Marie	Christian radio (French)
CKLX-FM	91.9 FM	Montreal	RNC Media	sports (French)
CKBE-FM	92.5 FM	Montreal	Cogeco	adult contemporary (English)
CBM-FM	93.5 FM	Montreal	CBC Music	public music
CKMF-FM	94.3 FM	Montreal	Énergie (Bell Media)	mainstream rock (French)
CBF-FM	95.1 FM	Montreal	Ici Radio-Canada Première	public news/talk (French)
CJFM-FM	95.9 FM	Montreal	Virgin Radio (Bell Media)	contemporary hit radio (English)
CKOI-FM	96.9 FM	Montreal	Cogeco (CKOI)	contemporary hit radio (French)
CHOM-FM	97.7 FM	Montreal	Bell Media Radio	mainstream rock (English)
CJPX-FM	99.5 FM	Montreal	Leclerc Communications	Qub radio + adult contemporary (French)
CKVL-FM	100.1 FM	Montreal	La radio communautaire de Ville LaSalle	community radio (French)
CBFX-FM	100.7 FM	Montreal	Ici Musique	public music (French)
CIBL-FM	101.5 FM	Montreal	Radio communautaire francophone de Montréal	community radio (French)
CINQ-FM	102.3 FM	Montreal	Radio Centre-Ville Saint-Louis	multilingual
CILO-FM	102.9 FM	Montreal	AGNI Communications Inc.	multilingual
CHOU-1-FM	104.5 FM	Montreal	Radio Moyen-Orient	multilingual
CKDG-FM	105.1 FM	Montreal	John Daperis (Mike Fm)	community radio (multilingual)
CKIN-FM	106.3 FM	Montreal	Canadian Hellenic Cable Radio	community radio (multilingual)
CITE-FM	107.3 FM	Montreal	Rouge FM (Bell Media)	soft adult contemporary (French)
CBF-FM-14	95.5 FM	Mont-Tremblant	Ici Radio-Canada Première	public news/talk (French)
CBMF-FM	98.1 FM	Mont-Tremblant	CBC Radio One	public news/talk
CIME-FM-2	101.3 FM	Mont-Tremblant	Cogeco (Rythme FM)	adult contemporary (French)
VF2215	88.1 FM	Mont-Wright	ArcelorMittal Mining Canada	rebroadcaster of CFMF-FM Fermont
VF2216	90.5 FM	Mont-Wright	ArcelorMittal Mining Canada	
VF2217	95.1 FM	Mont-Wright	ArcelorMittal Mining Canada	
CBGA-FM-6	97.7 FM	Murdochville	Ici Radio-Canada Première	public news/talk (French)
CBMJ	99.5 FM	Murdochville	CBC Radio One	public news/talk
CJMC-FM-8	103.1 FM	Murdochville	Radio du Golfe	adult contemporary (French)
CJRG-FM-1	104.7 FM	Murdochville	Radio Gaspésie	community radio (French)
CFNQ-FM	89.9 FM	Natashquan	Corporation de Radio montagnaise de Natashquan	First Nations community radio
CKNA-FM	104.1 FM	Natashquan	La Radio communautaire CKNA	community radio
CFNM-FM	99.9 FM	Nemaska	Nemaska Radio Station	community radio
CBGA-FM-1	98.7 FM	New Carlisle	Ici Radio-Canada Première	public news/talk (French)
CBVN	101.5 FM	New Carlisle	CBC Radio One	public news/talk
CHNC-FM	107.1 FM	New Carlisle	Radio CHNC	adult contemporary (French)
CBVR	103.5 FM	New Richmond	CBC Radio One	public news/talk
CBGA-FM-17	104.3 FM	New Richmond	Ici Radio-Canada Première	public news/talk (French)
CFEA-FM	92.5 FM	Nikamo (Camp LA-1)	Club Social du Nord-Est	community-owned rebroadcaster of CKAC Montreal
CFEB-FM	94.7 FM	Nikamo (Camp LA-1)	Club Social du Nord-Est	community-owned rebroadcaster of CITE-FM Montreal
CHNT-FM	92.3 FM	Notre-Dame-du-Nord	Minwadjimowin Algonquin Communication Society	First Nations community radio
CITK-FM	89.9 FM	Obedjiwan	Corporation Tepatcimo Kitotakan	First Nations community radio
CBFA-FM-2	92.9 FM	Obedjiwan	Ici Radio-Canada Première/CBC North	public news/talk (French)
CKHQ-FM	101.7 FM	Oka	Kanehsatake Communications Society	First Nations community radio
CFMV-FM-3	92.1 FM	Pabos Mills	Radio du Golfe	full service
CIBE-FM	90.1 FM	Pakuashipi	Corporation de Radio montagnaise de St-Augustin	First Nations community radio
VF2239	92.1 FM	Parent	Corporation municipale du Village de Parent	community radio (French)
CBF-FM-18	99.9 FM	Parent	Ici Radio-Canada Première	public news/talk (French)
CIEU-FM-1	106.1 FM	Paspébiac	Diffusion communautaire Baie-des-Chaleurs	community radio (French)
VF8005	88.5 FM	La Patrie	Fabrique de la Paroisse de La Patrie	Christian radio (French)
CKRJ-FM	91.9 FM	Percé	Radio du Rocher Percé inc.	tourist information (French)
CBGA-FM-18	104.5 FM	Percé	Ici Radio-Canada Première	public news/talk (French)
CBVP-FM	105.3 FM	Percé	CBC Radio One	public news/talk
CHNC-FM-3	107.3 FM	Percé	Radio CHNC	adult contemporary (French)
CIMB-FM	95.1 FM	Pessamit	Radio Ntetemuk	First Nations community radio
CIHO-FM-3	88.1 FM	Petite-Rivière-Saint-François	Radio MF Charlevoix	community radio (French)
CBJ-FM-5	101.3 FM	Petit-Saguenay	Ici Radio-Canada Première	public news/talk (French)
CJRG-FM-6	99.9 FM	Petite-Vallée	Radio Gaspésie	community radio (French)
CKAG-FM	100.1 FM	Pikogan	Société de communication Ikito Pikogan	First Nations community radio
VF8006	89.1 FM	Piopolis	Fabrique de la Paroisse de Piopolis	Christian radio (French)
CKYQ-FM	95.7 FM	Plessisville	176100 Canada Inc.	country (French)
CHOX-FM	97.5 FM	La Pocatière	Groupe Radio Simard	adult contemporary (French)
CFVD-FM-2	92.1 FM	Pohénégamook	Radio Dégelis	hot adult contemporary (French)
CIPC-FM	99.1 FM	Port-Cartier	Radio Port-Cartier	contemporary hit radio (French)
CBGA-FM-19	98.1 FM	Port-Cartier	Ici Radio-Canada Première	public news/talk (French)
CBVF	100.5 FM	Port-Daniel	CBC Radio One	public news/talk
CBSI-23	1130 AM	Port-Menier	Ici Radio-Canada Première	public news/talk (French) (Moving to 99.9 FM. CRTC approved June 13, 2025)
CJBE-FM	90.5 FM	Port-Menier	Radio Anticosti	community radio (French)
VF2156	99.9 FM	Poste Laverendrye	Club Social du Nord-Est	community-owned rebroadcaster of CITE-FM Montreal
VF2155	103.9 FM	Poste Laverendrye	Club Social du Nord-Est	community-owned rebroadcaster of CKAC Montreal
VF2442	94.1 FM	Puvirnituq	Taqramiut Nipingat	community radio (Inuktitut)
VF2435	94.1 FM	Quaqtaq	Taqramiut Nipingat	community radio (Inuktitut)
CKIA-FM	88.3 FM	Quebec City	Radio Basse-Ville	community radio
CKRL-FM	89.1 FM	Quebec City	CKRL MF 89,1 inc	community radio
CJNG-FM	89.7 FM	Quebec City	Radio touristique de Québec	tourist information
CION-FM	90.9 FM	Quebec City	Radio Galilée	Christian radio (French)
CJEC-FM	91.9 FM	Quebec City	Leclerc Communication Inc.	modern adult contemporary (French)
CJSQ-FM	92.7 FM	Quebec City	Arsenal Media	full service
CJMF-F]M	93.3 FM	Quebec City	Cogeco	talk/mainstream rock (French)
CHYZ-FM	94.3 FM	Quebec City	Université Laval	campus radio
CBVX-FM	95.3 FM	Quebec City	Ici Musique	public music (French)
CBM-FM-2	96.1 FM	Quebec City	CBC Music	public music
CHOI-FM	98.1 FM	Quebec City	RNC Media	talk (French)
CHIK-FM	98.9 FM	Quebec City	Bell Media Radio (Énergie)	mainstream rock (French)
CHXX-FM	100.9 FM	Quebec City	RNC Media	adult hits (French)
CFOI-FM	104.1 FM	Quebec City	Association d’Églises baptistes réformées du Québec	Christian radio (French)
CBVE-FM	104.7 FM	Quebec City	CBC Radio One	public news/talk
CBV-FM	106.3 FM	Quebec City	Ici Radio-Canada Première	public news/talk (French)
CKJF-FM	106.9 FM	Quebec City	Radio touristique de Québec	tourist information (French)
CITF-FM	107.5 FM	Quebec City	Bell Media Radio (Rouge FM)	soft adult contemporary (French)
CIGP-FM	92.3 FM	Radisson	Club Social du Nord-Est	community-owned rebroadcaster of CITE-FM Montreal
CBF-FM-7	100.1 FM	Radisson	Ici Radio-Canada Première	public news/talk (French)
CIAU-FM	103.1 FM	Radisson	Radio communautaire de Radisson	community radio (French)
CJBR-FM	89.1 FM	Rimouski	Ici Radio-Canada Première	public news/talk (French)
CKMN-FM	96.5 FM	Rimouski	La radio communautaire du comté Rimouski et Mont-Joli	community radio
CIKI-FM	98.7 FM	Rimouski	Bell Media Radio (Énergie)	mainstream rock (French)
CBRX-FM	101.5 FM	Rimouski	Ici Musique	public music (French)
CJOI-FM	102.9 FM	Rimouski	Bell Media Radio (Rouge FM)	soft adult contemporary (French)
CBGA-FM-3	91.5 FM	Rivière-au-Renard	Ici Radio-Canada Première	public news/talk (French)
CJRE-FM	97.9 FM	Rivière-au-Renard	Radio Gaspésie	community radio (English)
CILE-FM-2	97.7 FM	Rivière-au-Tonnerre	Radio-Télévision communautaire Havre-Saint-Pierre	community radio
CJBR-FM-1	89.5 FM	Rivière-du-Loup	Ici Radio-Canada Première	public news/talk (French)
CBRX-FM-3	90.7 FM	Rivière-du-Loup	Ici Musique	public music (French)
CIEL-FM-1	93.9 FM	Rivière-du-Loup	Groupe Radio Simard	adult contemporary (French)
CIEL-FM	103.7 FM	Rivière-du-Loup	Groupe Radio Simard	adult contemporary (French)
CIBM-FM	107.1 FM	Rivière-du-Loup	Groupe Radio Simard	contemporary hit radio (French)
CIBM-FM-1	107.9 FM	Rivière-du-Loup	Groupe Radio Simard	contemporary hit radio (French)
CBF-FM-15	88.3 FM	Rivière-Rouge	Ici Radio-Canada Première	public news/talk (French)
CFLO-FM-1	101.9 FM	Rivière-Rouge	Sonème inc.	full service
CFBS-FM-2	93.1 FM	Rivière-Saint-Paul	Radio Blanc-Sablon	community radio
CBSI-FM-20	103.1 FM	Rivière-Saint-Paul	Ici Radio-Canada Première	public news/talk (French)
CBMY-FM	104.3 FM	Rivière-Saint-Paul	CBC Radio One	public news/talk
CHRL-FM	99.5 FM	Roberval	Cogeco	adult contemporary (French)
CFLR-FM	90.1 FM	La Romaine	Corporation de Radio Montagnaise de La Romaine	First Nations community radio
CBSI-FM-8	99.9 FM	La Romaine	Ici Radio-Canada Première	public news/talk (French)
CHIC-FM	88.7 FM	Rouyn-Noranda	Communications CHIC	Christian radio (French)
CBFX-FM-4	89.9 FM	Rouyn-Noranda	Ici Musique	public music (French)
CHLM-FM	90.7 FM	Rouyn-Noranda	Ici Radio-Canada Première	public news/talk (French)
CBMA-FM	91.9 FM	Rouyn-Noranda	CBC Radio One	public news/talk
CHGO-FM-1	95.7 FM	Rouyn-Noranda	Cogeco	modern rock (French)
CHOA-FM	96.5 FM	Rouyn-Noranda	Cogeco	adult contemporary (French)
CHUN-FM	98.3 FM	Rouyn-Noranda	La Radio communautaire MF Lac-Simon	First Nations community radio
CJMM-FM	99.1 FM	Rouyn-Noranda	Bell Media Radio (Énergie)	mainstream rock (French)
CHME-FM-2	99.7 FM	Sacré-Coeur	Radio Essipit Haute-Côte-Nord	First Nations community radio
CKAJ-FM	92.5 FM	Saguenay	La Radio communautaire du Saguenay	community radio/oldies (French)
CBJ-FM	93.7 FM	Saguenay	Ici Radio-Canada Première	public news/talk (French)
CJAB-FM	94.5 FM	Saguenay	Bell Media Radio (Énergie)	mainstream rock (French)
CFIX-FM	96.9 FM	Saguenay	Bell Media Radio (Rouge FM)	soft adult contemporary (French)
CILM-FM	98.3 FM	Saguenay	Radio Saguenay	adult contemporary (French)
CBJX-FM	100.9 FM	Saguenay	Ici Musique	public music (French)
CBJE-FM	102.7 FM	Saguenay	CBC Radio One	public news/talk
CION-FM-2	106.7 FM	Saguenay	Radio Galilée	Christian radio (French)
CKAJ-FM-1	99.7 FM	Saguenay (La Baie)	La Radio communautaire du Saguenay	community radio/oldies (French)
CBJ-FM-6	102.1 FM	Saguenay (La Baie)	Ici Radio-Canada Première	public news/talk (French)
CKGS-FM	105.5 FM	Saguenay (La Baie)	Arsenal Média	country (French)
CHHO-FM-1	104.9 FM	Saint-Alexis-des-Monts	Coop de solidarité radio communautaire de la MRC de Maskinongé	community radio (French)
CBVX-FM-1	89.9 FM	Sainte-Anne-de-Beaupré	Ici Musique	public music (French)
CBV-FM-1	96.7 FM	Sainte-Anne-de-Beaupré	Ici Radio-Canada Première	public news/talk (French)
CJMC-FM	100.3 FM	Sainte-Anne-des-Monts	Radio du Golfe	adult contemporary (French)
CBGA-FM-7	101.1 FM	Sainte-Anne-des-Monts	Ici Radio-Canada Première	public news/talk (French)
CFIN-FM-3	105.5 FM	Saint-Anselme	Radio Bellechasse	community radio
CHOX-FM-3	100.1 FM	Saint-Aubert	Groupe Radio Simard	hot adult contemporary (French)
CJAS-FM	93.5 FM	Saint-Augustin (Côte-Nord)	La Radio communautaire de Rivière-Saint-Augustin	community radio (French)
CBMX-FM	102.3 FM	Saint-Augustin (Côte-Nord)	CBC Radio One	public news/talk
CBSI-FM-18	107.3 FM	Saint-Augustin (Côte-Nord)	Ici Radio-Canada Première	public news/talk (French)
CBF-FM-20	89.7 FM	Saint-Donat	Ici Radio-Canada Première	public news/talk (French)
CBV-FM-5	93.7 FM	Saint-Fabien-de-Panet	Ici Radio-Canada Première	public news/talk (French)
CFNJ-FM	99.1 FM	Saint-Gabriel-de-Brandon	Radio Nord-Joli	full service
VF8011	92.1 FM	Saint-Georges	Fabrique de la Paroisse Saint-Georges d'Aubert-Gallion	Christian radio (French)
CBV-FM-7	96.7 FM	Saint-Georges	Ici Radio-Canada Première	public news/talk (French)
CHJM-FM	99.7 FM	Saint-Georges	Groupe Radio Simard	contemporary hit radio (French)
CKRB-FM	103.5 FM	Saint-Georges	Groupe Radio Simard	adult contemporary (French)
CIHO-FM	96.3 FM	Saint-Hilarion	Radio MF Charlevoix	community radio (French)
CFEI-FM	106.5 FM	Saint-Hyacinthe	Bell Media Radio (Boom FM)	oldies (French)
CFIN-FM-4	105.5 FM	Saint-Jean-de-l'Île-d'Orléans	Radio Bellechasse	community radio
CFZZ-FM	104.1 FM	Saint-Jean-sur-Richelieu	Bell Media Radio (Boom FM)	oldies (French)
CFND-FM	101.9 FM	Saint-Jérôme	Amie du Quartier	community radio (French)
CIME-FM	103.9 FM	Saint-Jérôme	Cogeco (Rythme FM)	adult contemporary (French)
CIBM-FM-4	97.1 FM	Saint-Juste-du-Lac	Groupe Radio Simard	contemporary hit radio (French)
CHSV-FM	106.7 FM	Saint-Lazare	Evanov Communications	Soft AC/easy listening
CFIN-FM-2	105.5 FM	Saint-Malachie	Radio Bellechasse	community radio
CJMC-FM-5	92.7 FM	Saint-Maxime-du-Mont-Louis	Radio du Golfe	adult contemporary (French)
CBGA-FM-13	94.5 FM	Saint-Maxime-du-Mont-Louis	Ici Radio-Canada Première	public news/talk (French)
CBF-FM-13	90.9 FM	Saint-Michel-des-Saints	Ici Radio-Canada Première	public news/talk (French)
CBV-FM-4	88.7 FM	Saint-Pamphile	Ici Radio-Canada Première	public news/talk (French)
CJDS-FM	94.7 FM	Saint-Pamphile	Radio FM 200	community radio
CHOX-FM-2	101.1 FM	Sainte-Perpétue	Groupe Radio Simard	hot adult contemporary (French)
CHOC-FM	88.7 FM	Saint-Raymond	Michel Lambert, on behalf of a corporation to be incorporated	Adult contemporary (French)
CIHO-FM-4	88.1 FM	Saint-Siméon	Radio MF Charlevoix	community radio (French)
CFNJ-FM-1	88.9 FM	Saint-Zénon	Radio Nord-Joli	full service
CIKI-FM-2	93.9 FM	Sainte-Marguerite-Marie	Bell Media Radio (Énergie)	contemporary hit radio (French)
CHEQ-FM	101.5 FM	Sainte-Marie	Arsenal Media	full service
CHCT-FM	105.3 FM	Sainte-Marie	Arsenal Media	full service
VF2446	94.1 FM	Salluit	Taqramiut Nipingat	community radio (Inuktitut)
CHLM-FM-2	100.7 FM	La Sarre	Ici Radio-Canada Première	public news/talk (French)
CJGO-FM	102.1 FM	La Sarre	Cogeco	modern rock (French)
CHOA-FM-2	103.9 FM	La Sarre	Cogeco	adult contemporary (French)
CJCK-FM	89.9 FM	Schefferville	Naskapi Northern Wind Radio	First Nations community radio
CBSI-FM-2	91.1 FM	Schefferville	Ici Radio-Canada Première	public news/talk (French)
CBMH-FM	103.1 FM	Schefferville	CBC Radio One	public news/talk
CKOD-FM	103.1 FM	Salaberry-de-Valleyfield	Radio Express	adult contemporary (French)
CHPV-FM	103.7 FM	Scotstown	La Fabrique de la Paroisse de Saint-Paul	Christian radio (French)
CBF-FM-1	95.9 FM	Senneterre	Ici Radio-Canada Première	public news/talk (French)
CIBO-FM	100.5 FM	Senneterre	La Radio communautaire MF de Senneterre	community radio (French)
CBMM-FM	101.7 FM	Senneterre	CBC Radio One	public news/talk
CKAU-FM-1	90.1 FM	Sept-Îles	Corporation de Radio Kushapetsheken Apetuamiss Uashat	First Nations community radio
CKCN-FM	94.1 FM	Sept-Îles	Radio Sept-Îles	hot adult contemporary (French)
CBRX-FM-2	96.1 FM	Sept-Îles	Ici Musique	public music (French)
CBSE-FM	96.9 FM	Sept-Îles	CBC Radio One	public news/talk
CBSI-FM	98.1 FM	Sept-Îles	Ici Radio-Canada Première	public news/talk (French)
VF8001	88.9 FM	Shawinigan	Fabrique de la Paroisse Saint-Sauveur	Christian radio (French)
CFUT-FM	92.9 FM	Shawinigan	La radio campus communautaire francophone de Shawinigan	community radio
VF8015	90.7 FM	Shawinigan-Sud	Fabrique de la Paroisse Sainte-Jeanne-d'Arc	Christian radio (French)
CFPP-FM	88.1 FM	Sherbrooke	Fabrique Notre-Dame-du-Perpétuel-Secours	Christian radio (French)
CFAK-FM	88.3 FM	Sherbrooke	Université de Sherbrooke	campus radio
CJMQ-FM	88.9 FM	Sherbrooke	Radio Bishop's	campus radio (English)
CBM-FM-1	89.7 FM	Sherbrooke	CBC Music	public music
CBFX-FM-2	90.7 FM	Sherbrooke	Ici Musique	public music (French)
CBMB-FM	91.7 FM	Sherbrooke	CBC Radio One	public news/talk
CJRF-FM	93.1 FM	Sherbrooke	Fabrique de la Paroisse de Sainte-Praxède	Christian radio (French)
CFGE-FM	93.7 FM	Sherbrooke	Cogeco (Rythme FM)	adult contemporary (French)
CITE-FM-2	94.5 FM	Sherbrooke	Bell Media Radio (Rouge FM)	soft adult contemporary (French)
CFLX-FM	95.5 FM	Sherbrooke	Radio communautaire de l'Estrie	community radio (French)
CIRA-FM-1	100.3 FM	Sherbrooke	Radio Ville-Marie	Christian radio (French)
CBF-FM-10	101.1 FM	Sherbrooke	Ici Radio-Canada Première	public news/talk (French)
CITE-FM-1	102.7 FM	Sherbrooke	Bell Media Radio (Rouge FM)	soft adult contemporary (French)
CIMO-FM-1	106.9 FM	Sherbrooke	Bell Media Radio (Énergie)	mainstream rock (French)
CKOY-FM	107.7 FM	Sherbrooke	Cogeco	talk (French)
CJSO-FM	101.7 FM	Sorel-Tracy	Radiodiffusion Sorel-Tracy	adult contemporary (French)
CFVD-FM-3	92.1 FM	Squatec	Radio Dégelis	hot adult contemporary (French)
CIEL-FM-5	93.5 FM	Sully	Groupe Radio Simard	adult contemporary (French)
CIBM-FM-3	96.7 FM	Sully	Groupe Radio Simard	contemporary hit radio (French)
CFTH-FM-2	98.5 FM	La Tabatière	Radio communautaire de Harrington Harbour	community radio (French)
CBSI-FM-17	100.1 FM	La Tabatière	Ici Radio-Canada Première	public news/talk (French)
CBMT-FM	101.5 FM	La Tabatière	CBC Radio One	public news/talk
CHME-FM-1	99.7 FM	Tadoussac	Radio Essipit Haute-Côte-Nord	First Nations community radio
VF2444	94.1 FM	Tasiujaq	Taqramiut Nipingat	community radio (Inuktitut)
CKVM-FM-1	92.1 FM	Témiscaming	Radio Témiscamingue	adult contemporary (French)
CBFZ-FM	103.1 FM	Témiscaming	Ici Radio-Canada Première	public news/talk (French)
CIEL-FM-3	98.3 FM	Témiscouata-sur-le-Lac	Groupe Radio Simard	adult contemporary (French)
CJTB-FM	93.1 FM	Tête-à-la-Baleine	Radio communautaire Tête-à-la-Baleine	community radio (French)
CBSI-FM-16	103.5 FM	Tête-à-la-Baleine	Ici Radio-Canada Première	public news/talk (French)
CBV-FM-8	90.1 FM	Thetford Mines	Ici Radio-Canada Première	public news/talk (French)
CFJO-FM	97.3 FM	Thetford Mines	Réseau des Appalaches	contemporary hit radio (French)
CKLD-FM	105.5 FM	Thetford Mines	Arsenal Media	soft adult contemporary
CIEL-FM-4	93.9 FM	Trois-Pistoles	Groupe Radio Simard	adult contemporary (French)
CIBM-FM-2	104.9 FM	Trois-Pistoles	Groupe Radio Simard	contemporary hit radio (French)
CFOU-FM	89.1 FM	Trois-Rivières	Université du Québec à Trois-Rivières	campus radio
CIRA-FM-2	89.9 FM	Trois-Rivières	Radio Ville-Marie	Christian radio (French)
CBMZ-FM	93.9 FM	Trois-Rivières	CBC Radio One	public news/talk
CHEY-FM	94.7 FM	Trois-Rivières	Bell Media Radio (Rouge FM)	soft adult contemporary (French)
CBF-FM-8	96.5 FM	Trois-Rivières	Ici Radio-Canada Première	public news/talk (French)
CJEB-FM	100.1 FM	Trois-Rivières	Cogeco (Rythme FM)	adult contemporary (French)
CIGB-FM	102.3 FM	Trois-Rivières	Bell Media Radio (Énergie)	mainstream rock (French)
CBFX-FM-1	104.3 FM	Trois-Rivières	Ici Musique	public music (French)
VF2477	105.9 FM	Trois-Rivières	Club de solidarité du Bois-Joli inc.	community radio/talk (French)
CKOB-FM	106.9 FM	Trois-Rivières	Cogeco	talk (French)
VF8010	94.1 FM	La Tuque	Fabrique de la Paroisse Marie-Médiatrice	Christian radio (French)
CFLM-FM	97.1 FM	La Tuque	10679313 Canada inc. (Arsenal Média)	adult contemporary (French)
CBVE-1	101.9 FM	La Tuque	CBC Radio One	public news/talk
CBF-FM-19	103.7 FM	La Tuque	Ici Radio-Canada Première	public news/talk (French)
VF2440	94.1 FM	Umiujaq	Taqramiut Nipingat	community radio (Inuktitut)
CHUT-FM-1	92.5 FM	Val-d'Or	La Radio communautaire MF Lac-Simon	First Nations community radio
CJMV-FM	102.7 FM	Val-d'Or	Bell Media Radio (Énergie)	mainstream rock (French)
CHVL-FM	106.5 FM	Val-des-Lacs	Radio Vallacquoise	community radio (French)
CBF-FM-11	96.1 FM	Val-des-Sources	Ici Radio-Canada Première	public news/talk (French)
CJAN-FM	99.3 FM	Val-des-Sources	Radio Plus BMD	adult contemporary (French)
CIME-FM-1	102.9 FM	Val-Morin	Cogeco (Rythme FM)	hot adult contemporary (French)
CJVD-FM	100.1 FM	Vaudreuil-Dorion	Yves Sauvé (OBCI)	adult hits (French)
CKIE-FM	88.1 FM	Victoriaville	JFN Productions	tourist information (French)
CIRA-FM-3	89.3 FM	Victoriaville	Radio Ville-Marie	Christian radio (French)
CBF-FM-12	92.7 FM	Victoriaville	Ici Radio-Canada Première	public news/talk (French)
CFDA-FM	101.9 FM	Victoriaville	10679313 Canada inc. (Arsenal Média)	soft adult contemporary
CKYQ-FM-1	103.5 FM	Victoriaville	176100 Canada Inc.	country
CBSI-FM-19	91.7 FM	Vieux-Fort	Ici Radio-Canada Première	public news/talk (French)
CBMV-FM	95.9 FM	Vieux-Fort	CBC Radio One	public news/talk
CBFY-FM	89.1 FM	Ville-Marie	Ici Radio-Canada Première	public news/talk (French)
CKVM-FM	93.1 FM	Ville-Marie	Radio Témiscamingue	adult contemporary (French)
CJRH-FM	92.5 FM	Waskaganish	Waskaganish Eeyou Telecommunications Association	First Nations community radio
CBFH-FM	103.5 FM	Waskaganish	Ici Radio-Canada Première/CBC North	public news/talk (French)
CBMQ-FM	105.1 FM	Waskaganish	CBC Radio One	public news/talk
CFNE-FM	93.9 FM	Waswanipi	Waswanipi Communications Society	First Nations community radio
CBFV-FM	101.5 FM	Waswanipi	Ici Radio-Canada Première/CBC North	public news/talk (French)
CBVW-FM	105.1 FM	Waswanipi	CBC Radio One	public news/talk
VF8027	98.5 FM	Weedon	Fabrique de la Paroisse de Saint-Gérard	Christian radio (French)
VF8008	92.7 FM	Weedon Centre	Fabrique de la Paroisse Saint-Janvier de Weedon	Christian radio (French)
CHPH-FM	99.9 FM	Wemindji	Wemindji Telecommunications Association	First Nations community radio
CBFW-FM	103.5 FM	Wemindji	Ici Radio-Canada Première/CBC North	public news/talk (French)
CBMW-FM	105.1 FM	Wemindji	CBC Radio One	public news/talk
CIHW-FM	100.3 FM	Wendake	Comité de la radio communautaire Huronne	First Nations community radio
CBFG-FM-3	92.3 FM	Weymontachie	Ici Radio-Canada Première/CBC North	public news/talk (French)
CKRQ-FM	96.5 FM	Whapmagoostui	Whapmagoostui Aeyouch Telecommunications	First Nations community radio
VF8009	88.1 FM	Windsor	Fabrique de la Paroisse Saint-Philippe de Windsor	Christian radio (French)
CIAX-FM	98.3 FM	Windsor	Carrefour jeunesse emploi-Comté Johnson	community radio (French)
VF8004	88.1 FM	Woburn	Fabrique de la Paroisse Saint-Augustin de Woburn	Christian radio (French)

Internet-only

Frequency	City of Licence	Branding	Owner	Format	Notes
Internet only	Montreal	ICI Radio Atmosphere	Ici Musique	Ambient music (French)	Serving provincial wide
Internet only	Montreal	CHOC.ca	Université du Québec à Montréal	Campus radio (French)	
Internet only	Montreal	Magic FM	Magic FM Montreal	Classic rock (English)	
Internet only	Montreal	ICI Radio Classique	Ici Musique	Classical radio (French)	It could be listened through 95.1 FM-HD2. Serving provincial wide
Internet only	Montreal	Radio Classique	Group Musique Greg	Classical radio (French)	
Internet only	Montreal	Techno FM	N/A	Dance/EDM(English)	
Internet only	Montreal	Montreal Greek Radio	Dimitri Papadopoulos	Multilingual	
Internet only	Montreal	ICI Radio Rock	Ici Musique	Rock (French)	Serving provincial wide
Internet only	Montreal	Smooth Motion FM	Motion FM	Smooth Jazz/Urban AC (English)	
Internet only	Montreal	Qub Radio	Quebecor Media	Talk/News (French)	Serving provincial wide
Internet only	Montreal	ICI Radio Hip hop	Ici Musique	Urban contemporary (French)	Serving provincial wide
Internet only	Montreal	Le Rapologue	N/A	Urban contemporary (French)	

== See also ==
- List of Quebec media
- Lists of radio stations in North and Central America
