= CHLC =

CHLC may refer to:

- CHLC-FM, a radio station (97.1 FM) licensed to Baie-Comeau, Quebec, Canada
- Cooperative Human Linkage Center
- Certified Holistic Life Coach
