= CJRG-FM =

Radio station in Gaspé, Quebec

Coordinates: 48°50′01″N 64°15′24″W

Gaspé, Quebec; Canada
- Frequency: 94.5 MHz
- Branding: Radio Gaspésie 94,5

Programming
- Language: French
- Format: community radio

Ownership
- Owner: Radio Gaspésie

History
- First air date: 1974
- Former frequencies: 93.3 MHz (1978–1987)

Technical information
- Class: B
- ERP: 3.8 kW average 6 kW peak horizontal polarization only
- HAAT: 409.4 metres (1,343 ft)

Links
- Webcast: CJRG listen online
- Website: Radio Gaspesie Website

CJRG-FM is a Canadian radio station that broadcasts at 94.5 FM in Gaspé, Quebec and airing a community radio format.

The station originally began broadcasting in 1978 at 93.3 FM, then moved to its current frequency in 1987.

CJRG is owned by Radio Gaspésie.

The station is a member of the Association des radiodiffuseurs communautaires du Québec.

== Transmitters ==
Rebroadcasters of CJRG-FM
City of licence	Identifier	Frequency	RECNet	CRTC Decision
Murdochville	CJRG-FM-1	104.7 FM	Query	91-739
Gaspé (Fontenelle)	CJRG-FM-2	97.3 FM	Query	2007-110
Gaspé (Rivière-au-Renard)	CJRG-FM-3	97.9 FM	Query	
Gaspé (L'Anse-à-Valleau)	CJRG-FM-4	95.3 FM	Query	84-42
Grande-Vallée	CJRG-FM-5	98.5 FM	Query	2011-145
Petite-Vallée	CJRG-FM-6	99.9 FM	Query	
Cloridorme	CJRG-FM-7	98.9 FM	Query	

Original callsigns CJRV-FM L'Anse-à-Valleau and CJRE-FM Rivière-au-Renard.

On March 3, 2011, the station received CRTC approval to add additional transmitters.

- Grande-Vallée CJRG-FM-5 98.5 MHz
- Petite-Vallée CJRG-FM-6 99.9 MHz
- Cloridorme CJRG-FM-7 98.9 MHz
