= CFNJ =

CFNJ may refer to:

- CFNJ-FM, a radio station (99.1 FM) licensed to St-Gabriel-de-Brando, Quebec, Canada
- Christ for the Nations Japan, a religious educational institute in Japan
