= CFBS =

CFBS may refer to:

- CFBS-FM, a community radio station in Canada
- Chemin de Fer de la Baie de Somme, a heritage railway in France.
