= CJMC-FM =

Radio station in Sainte-Anne-des-Monts, Quebec

Coordinates: 49°08′11″N 66°20′12″W

- Sainte-Anne-des-Monts, Quebec; Canada
- Frequency: 100.3 MHz
- Branding: CJMC FM, Bleu Fm 100,3

Programming
- Language: French
- Format: adult contemporary

Ownership
- Owner: Radio du Golfe
- Sister stations: CFMV-FM

History
- First air date: 1975

Technical information
- Class: B
- ERP: 2,510 watts Vertical polarization only
- HAAT: 275.5 metres (904 ft)

Links
- Webcast: Listen Live
- Website: CJMC-FM Bleu Fm 100,3

CJMC-FM is a French-language Canadian radio station located in Sainte-Anne-des-Monts, Quebec.

Owned and operated by Radio du Golfe, it broadcasts on 100.3 MHz with an effective radiated power of 2,510 watts using an omnidirectional antenna (class B). The station has an adult contemporary music format.

The station originally signed on in 1975 at 1490 AM, until it was licensed to move to its current frequency in 1995.

The station shares its website with co-owned CFMV-FM in Chandler.

== Rebroadcasters ==
The station also has the following rebroadcast transmitters:

Rebroadcasters of CJMC-FM
City of licence	Identifier	Frequency	Power	Class	RECNet	CRTC Decision
Sainte-Marthe	CJMC-FM-1	92.7 FM	50 watts	LP	Query	
Mont-Louis	CJMC-FM-2	92.7 FM	50 watts	LP	Query	
Les Méchins	CJMC-FM-3	103.1 FM	50 watts	LP	Query	2001-28
Grande-Vallée	CJMC-FM-4	92.7 FM	50 watts	LP	Query	
Gros-Morne	CJMC-FM-5	92.7 FM	8 watts	VLP	Query	2001-237; 2003-489
Cloridorme	CJMC-FM-6	103.1 FM	9 watts	LP	Query	2001-368
Murdochville	CJMC-FM-8	103.1 FM	50 watts	LP	Query	2001-368
