= CFTH =

The acronym CFTH may represent:

- CFTH-FM-1, a radio station in Harrington Harbour, Quebec, Canada
- Coalition for the Homeless, an American non-profit group
- Compagnie Française Thomson-Houston
