= CHNC-FM =

Radio station in New Carlisle, Quebec

Coordinates: 48°08′27″N 65°14′38″W

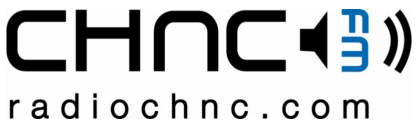
- New Carlisle, Quebec; Canada
- Broadcast area: Gaspésie
- Frequency: 107.1 MHz
- Branding: Radio CHNC

Programming
- Language: French
- Format: adult contemporary
- Affiliations: Cogeco

Ownership
- Owner: Coopérative des travailleurs CHNC

History
- First air date: December 23, 1933
- Call sign meaning: Charles Houde New Carlisle

Technical information
- Class: B1
- ERP: vertical polarization only: 4,100 watts (average); 6,500 watts (peak)
- HAAT: 200 metres (660 ft)

Links
- Website: www.radiochnc.com

CHNC-FM is a French-language Canadian radio station located in New Carlisle, Quebec, Canada.

Owned and operated by Coopérative des travailleurs CHNC, it broadcasts on 107.1 MHz using a directional antenna with an average effective radiated power of 4,100 watts and a peak effective radiated power of 6,500 watts (class B); it was previously heard on 610 kHz, with a daytime power of 10,000 watts and a nighttime power of 5,000 watts as a class B station, using a directional antenna with slightly different daytime and nighttime directional patterns in order to protect various other stations on that frequency.

The station has an adult contemporary music format, although some news/talk programs from CHMP-FM in Montreal are now being aired. It is an affiliate of the Cogeco network.

CHNC went on the air as an AM station on December 23, 1933, and it was originally an affiliate of the Canadian Radio Broadcasting Commission from 1933 to 1936 when it became an affiliate of Radio Canada.

CHNC's programming is also heard on CHGM-FM, which is located in Gaspé, it broadcasts on 99.3 MHz with an average effective radiated power of 257 watts and a peak effective radiated power of 468 watts (class A). Local programming from CHGM ceased completely in 1986.

On March 3, 2008, Radio CHNC ltée has received approval by the CRTC to convert the AM transmitters to the FM band and include addition of FM transmitters in Carleton-sur-Mer, Chandler and Percé, Quebec. As of late 2008, the new FM signals began on December 23, 2008.

== Rebroadcasters ==
Rebroadcasters of CHNC-FM
City of licence	Identifier	Frequency	Power	Class	RECNet	CRTC Decision
Carleton-sur-Mer	CHNC-FM-1	99.1	480 average, 790 peak watts	B1	Query	
Chandler	CHNC-FM-2	98.1	810 average, 1,280 peak watts	A	Query	
Percé	CHNC-FM-3	107.3	426 average, 1,200 peak watts	B1	Query	
Rivière-au-Renard	CHGM-FM-1	106.7	325 average, 520 peak watts	A	Query	

== Technical changes/notes ==
On October 21, 2011, the CRTC approved an application by Coopérative des travailleurs CHNC to change the technical parameters for the mother station CHNC-FM by increasing the average effective radiated power (ERP) from 3,400 to 4,100 watts (maximum ERP from 5,350 to 6,500 watts and effective height of antenna above average terrain (EHAAT) from 180 to 200 metres). The licensee also received approval to modify CHNC-FM-1's EHAAT by increasing it from 395 to 418.5 metres and changing CHNC-FM-2's frequency from 98.3 to 98.1 and increasing the average ERP (for CHNC-FM-2) from 550 to 810 watts (maximum ERP from 870 to 1,280 watts).
