= CHVL-FM =

Community radio station in Val-des-Lacs, Quebec

- Val-des-Lacs, Quebec; Canada
- Frequency: 106.5 MHz
- Branding: Radio Vallacquoise

Programming
- Language: French
- Format: Community radio

Ownership
- Owner: Radio Vallacquoise Inc.

History
- First air date: 2013

Technical information
- Licensing authority: CRTC
- ERP: 5 watts
- HAAT: −3.8 metres (−12 ft)
- Transmitter coordinates: 46.208661°N 74.378217°W

Links
- Website: www.radiovallacquoise.net

CHVL-FM is a French language community radio station which operates on the frequency of 106.5 MHz (FM) in Val-des-Lacs, Quebec, Canada. Owned by Radio Vallacquoise Inc., the group received CRTC approval on March 11, 2013.
