= CHUT-FM =

Radio station in Quebec, Canada

Coordinates: 48°03′32″N 77°21′06″W

CHUN-FM
- Rouyn-Noranda, Quebec; Canada
- Frequency: 98.3 MHz
- Branding: CHUN 98.3 fm

Programming
- Language: French
- Format: community radio
- Affiliations: Rouyn-Noranda Huskies

Ownership
- Owner: La Radio Communautaire MF Lac-Simon Inc.
- Sister stations: CHUT-FM, CHUT-FM-1

Technical information
- Class: A
- ERP: 490 watts
- HAAT: 103.3 metres (339 ft)

Links
- Website: www.chunfm.ca

CHUT-FM is a Canadian radio station, broadcasting at 95.3 FM in Lac-Simon, Quebec. A community radio station for the Algonquin Nation Anishinabe du Lac Simon, the station also has a rebroadcaster in Val-d'Or on 92.5 FM (CHUT-FM-1) and another in Rouyn-Noranda on 98.3 FM with the callsign CHUN-FM.

On December 21, 2010, the CRTC approved an application by Radio Communautaire MF Lac Simon inc. to increase CHUN-FM's effective radiated power from 490 watts to 3,400 watts (non-directional antenna with an effective height of antenna above average terrain decreased from 108.7 to 103.3 meters).

== Transmitters ==
Rebroadcasters of CHUT-FM
City of licence	Identifier	Frequency	Power	Class	RECNet	CRTC Decision
Val-d'Or	CHUT-FM-1	92.5 FM	50 watts	LP	Query	2001-90
