= CFMV-FM =

Radio station in Chandler, Quebec

Coordinates: 48°13′09″N 64°48′21″W

- Chandler, Quebec; Canada
- Frequency: 96.3 MHz
- Branding: CJMC FM Bleu Fm 96,3

Programming
- Language: French
- Format: adult contemporary

Ownership
- Owner: Radio du Golfe
- Sister stations: CJMC-FM

History
- First air date: 2004

Technical information
- Class: B
- ERP: 22.9 kW
- HAAT: 123.8 metres (406 ft)

Links
- Webcast: Listen Live
- Website: CFMV-FM Bleu Fm 96,3

CFMV-FM is a French-language Canadian radio station located in Chandler, Quebec.

Owned and operated by Radio du Golfe, it broadcasts on 96.3 MHz with an effective radiated power of 5,700 watts and a peak effective radiated power of 22,900 watts (class B). The station has an adult contemporary music format.

The station was licensed in 2004 on the frequency 92.1 MHz, then later moved to its current frequency.

The station shares its website with co-owned CJMC-FM in Sainte-Anne-des-Monts.

On October 2, 2009, CFMV applied to add a low-power transmitter on 104.1 MHz at Percé, Quebec. This application was denied on February 4, 2010, on the grounds that the station would not meet conditions in regards to programming. A second attempt to add a low-power transmitter at Percé, now on 97.3 MHz, was again denied on April 16, 2012, this time due to potential interference with a repeater of CJRG-FM in Fontenelle, approximately 48 km (30 mi) northwest of Percé.
