= CKAJ-FM =

Radio station in Saguenay, Quebec, Canada

Coordinates: 48°27′30″N 71°04′46″W

- Saguenay, Quebec; Canada
- Frequencies: 92.5 MHz (Chicoutimi-Jonquière); 99.7 MHz (La Baie)
- Branding: CKAJ 92,5

Programming
- Format: Oldies

Ownership
- Owner: La Radio Communautaire du Saguenay

History
- First air date: April 11, 1977
- Call sign meaning: Chicoutimi Kénogami Arvida Jonquière

Technical information
- Class: B
- ERP: 14.2 kW
- HAAT: 141.5 metres (464 ft)

Links
- Website: www.ckaj.org

CKAJ-FM is a French language Canadian radio station located in Saguenay, Quebec.

Owned and operated by La Radio Communautaire du Saguenay, it broadcasts on 92.5 MHz with an effective radiated power of 14,164 watts (class B) using an omnidirectional antenna, while a low-power rebroadcaster serves the borough of La Baie on 99.7 MHz.

The station is a community radio station with a mainly oldies format since 1997 (it previously had an adult contemporary format).

== History ==
The station was first licensed by the Canadian Radio-television and Telecommunications Commission in 1976, and began broadcasting on April 11, 1977 with the call sign CHOC-FM. It originally aired from a low-power 423-watt transmitter, which was increased to 3,000 watts in 1981.

Due to a variety of financial and staff turnover problems, the station was granted only short-term license renewals between 1986 and 1998, sometimes for as little as three months at a time rather than the standard seven-year license period.

The station adopted its current call sign and oldies format in 1997, and added the rebroadcaster in the La Baie neighbourhood in 2006.

On July 31, 2008, CKAJ was authorized to increase power from 2,693 watts to 14,164 watts, increasing the effective antenna height and relocating the antenna. The new technical parameters will result in the borough of Chicoutimi receiving a stronger signal.

The station is a member of the Association des radiodiffuseurs communautaires du Québec.
