= CKVM-FM =

Radio station in Ville-Marie, Quebec

Coordinates: 47°19′57″N 79°25′37″W

- Ville-Marie, Quebec; Canada
- Frequency: 93.1 MHz
- Branding: FM 93,1 CKVM

Programming
- Language: French
- Format: Adult contemporary

Ownership
- Owner: Radio Témiscamingue

History
- First air date: January 7, 1950
- Former frequencies: 710 kHz
- Call sign meaning: Ville-Marie

Technical information
- Class: B
- ERP: 18,400 watts (average); 34,000 watts (peak)
- HAAT: 109 metres (358 ft)
- Repeater: CKVM-FM-1 (92.1 MHz) Témiscaming

Links
- Webcast: Listen live
- Website: ckvmfm.com

CKVM-FM is a French-language Canadian radio station located in Ville-Marie, Quebec.

Owned and operated by Radio Témiscamingue (a non-profit organization), it broadcasts on 93.1 MHz with an effective radiated power of 18,400 watts and a peak effective radiated power of 34,000 watts (class B) using an omnidirectional antenna. The station has an adult contemporary format.

The station operates a small relay, CKVM-FM-1 in Témiscaming, which broadcasts on 92.1 MHz with an effective radiated power of 10 watts (class LP) using an omnidirectional antenna.

Previously known as CKVM when the station was on 710 kHz, the station moved to FM in 2004. The station went on the air on January 7, 1950, on 710 kHz, originally using 1,000 watts full-time (and using a directional antenna at night). Daytime power was increased from 1,000 watts to 10,000 watts in August 1961.

In 1968, CKVM opened up an AM radio station at Témiscaming on 1340 kHz as CKVT. In 1988, CKVT was authorized to move to FM at 92.1 MHz, until it went dark in 1992, when it was replaced by the current CKVM-FM-1.

CKVM was widely known for failing to follow its nighttime technical parameters by operating at night with 10,000 watts omnidirectional, therefore causing interference to American clear channel station WOR in New York City. The station admitted this situation during a Canadian Radio-television and Telecommunications Commission (CRTC) public hearing in 2001. Part of the problem was that CKVM lost two of its three towers at some point during the 1990s and was unable to replace them. The station's move to FM was done in large part to solve these technical problems.

The station was an affiliate of Radio-Canada's Première Chaîne from August 1953 until 2002. CKVM was one of the last private affiliate radio stations to disaffiliate from Radio-Canada.
