= CHME-FM =

Coordinates: 48°06′40″N 69°01′25″W

- Les Escoumins, Quebec; Canada
- Frequency: 94.9 FM
- Branding: Rock Ma Vie (Rock My Life)

Programming
- Format: community radio

Ownership
- Owner: Radio Essipit Haute-Côte-Nord

Technical information
- Class: B
- ERP: 2.559 kW average 4.656 kW peak
- HAAT: 182.8 metres (600 ft)

Links
- Website: CHME Website

CHME-FM is a Canadian radio station, which broadcasts at 94.9 FM in Les Escoumins, Quebec. Owned by Radio Essipit Haute-Côte-Nord, the station broadcasts a community radio format for an Innu audience.

The station began broadcasting on its original frequency at 95.1 FM, until it moved to its current 94.9 FM frequency in 1993.

== Rebroadcasters ==
Rebroadcasters of CHME-FM
City of licence	Identifier	Frequency	RECNet	CRTC Decision
Tadoussac	CHME-FM-1	99.7	Query	97-111
Sacré-Coeur	CHME-FM-2	99.7	Query	
Forestville	CHME-FM-3	99.7	Query	2004-437
