= CKAU-FM =

First Nations community radio station in Quebec, Canada

Coordinates: 50°12′46″N 66°11′37″W

- Maliotenam, Quebec; Canada
- Frequency: 104.5 MHz

Programming
- Language: French
- Format: community radio

Ownership
- Owner: Radio Kushapetsheken Apetuamiss Uashat

Technical information
- Class: LP
- ERP: 50 watts horizontal polarization only
- HAAT: 21 metres (69 ft)
- Repeaters: CKAU-FM-1 90.1 Sept-Îles and Uashat

Links
- Website: www.ckau.com

CKAU-FM is a French language First Nations community radio station that operates at 104.5 FM in Maliotenam, Quebec. A rebroadcaster at 90.1 FM, CKAU-FM-1, serves the adjacent communities of Sept-Îles and Uashat.

Owned by Corporation de Radio Kushapetsheken Apetuamiss Uashat, the station received CRTC approval in 1992.
