= CILE-FM =

Coordinates: 50°16′29″N 63°41′14″W

- Havre-Saint-Pierre, Quebec; Canada
- Frequency: 95.1 MHz
- Branding: CILE 95.1 - 97.7

Ownership
- Owner: Radio-Télévision communautaire Havre-Saint-Pierre

Technical information
- Class: A
- ERP: 430 watts
- HAAT: 46.5 metres (153 ft)
- Repeaters: CILE-FM-1 (97.7 MHz) Lac-Allard; CILE-FM-2 (97.7 MHz) Rivière-au-Tonnerre

Links
- Webcast: Listen live
- Website: www.cilemf.com

CILE-FM is a community radio station that operates at 95.1 FM in Havre-Saint-Pierre, Quebec.

Owned by Radio-Télévision communautaire Havre-Saint-Pierre, the station was licensed in 1990 and was launched in 1991.

The station is a member of the Association des radiodiffuseurs communautaires du Québec.

== Transmitters ==
Rebroadcasters of CILE-FM
City of licence	Identifier	Frequency	Power	Class	RECNet
Lac-Allard	CILE-FM-1	97.7 FM	7 watts	LP	Query
Rivière-au-Tonnerre	CILE-FM-2	97.7 FM	17 watts	LP	Query
