= Cooperative Human Linkage Center =

CHLC (or Cooperative Human Linkage Center) was a National Institutes of Health project to map a large number of human genome markers, prior to the completion of the Human Genome Project. The project was stopped in 1999.
