= CJPB-FM =

Radio station in Saint-Laurent, Quebec

Saint-Laurent, Quebec; Canada
- Frequency: 90.7 MHz
- Branding: La Voix de St-Lo

Programming
- Format: Community radio

Ownership
- Owner: Centre communautaire "Bon Courage" de Place Benoît

History
- First air date: 2017

Technical information
- ERP: 50 watts
- HAAT: 11.6 metres

CJPB-FM is a French language community radio station that operates at 90.7 FM in Saint-Laurent, Quebec, Canada.

== History ==
Owned by Centre communautaire "Bon Courage" de Place Benoît, the station received approval by the Canadian Radio-television and Telecommunications Commission (CRTC) on June 7, 2016 and signed on in 2017.
