= CFLO-FM =

Radio station in Mont-Laurier, Quebec

- Mont-Laurier, Quebec; Canada
- Frequency: 104.7 MHz
- Branding: CFLO

Programming
- Language: French
- Format: Full-service

Ownership
- Owner: Sonème 2007 Inc.

History
- First air date: May 19, 1963
- Former call signs: CKML (1963–1988)
- Former frequencies: 610 kHz (1963–1995)

Technical information
- Licensing authority: CRTC
- Class: B
- ERP: 10,980 watts (average); 16,860 watts (peak)
- HAAT: 154.5 metres (507 ft)
- Transmitter coordinates: 46°32′34″N 75°27′2″W
- Repeater: 101.9 CFLO-FM-1 (L'Annonciation)

Links
- Website: cflo.ca

CFLO-FM is a French-language Canadian radio station located in Mont-Laurier, Quebec.

Owned and operated by Sonème inc. (an independent private company), it broadcasts on 104.7 MHz using a directional antenna with an average effective radiated power of 10,980 watts and a peak effective radiated power of 16,860 watts (class B).

The station has a full service format. It went on the air on May 19, 1963, as an AM station broadcasting on 610 kHz, and was originally known as CKML. The call sign was changed to CFLO in October 1988, as the station was re-launched after being silent since October 1986 due to a bankruptcy. The station moved to FM in 1995.

CFLO-FM operates one rebroadcaster, namely CFLO-FM-1 in Rivière-Rouge, which broadcasts in stereo on 101.9 MHz with an effective radiated power of 1,150 watts (class A) using an omnidirectional antenna. That station was originally known as CKLR when it went on the air in 1975; at the time, it was on 1490 kHz. The call sign was changed to CKLO in October 1988. The rebroadcaster moved to FM in 1995 and adopted its current call sign at that time.
