= Rivière-Saint-Paul, Quebec =

Unincorporated community in Canada

Coordinates: 51.475548°N 57.706802°W

Rivière-Saint-Paul (St. Paul's River) is an unincorporated community in Bonne-Espérance, Quebec, Canada. It is recognized as a designated place by Statistics Canada.

== Demographics ==
In the 2021 Census of Population conducted by Statistics Canada, Rivière-Saint-Paul had a population of 147 living in 63 of its 73 total private dwellings, a change of 47% from its 2016 population of 100. With a land area of 0.2 km^{2} (0.077 sq mi), it had a population density of 735.0/km^{2} (1,903.6/sq mi) in 2021.

== See also ==
- List of communities in Quebec
- List of designated places in Quebec
