= CHEF-FM =

Radio station in Matagami, Quebec

Coordinates: 49°45′38″N 77°37′36″W

- Matagami, Quebec; Canada
- Frequency: 99.9 MHz
- Branding: CHEF 99,9

Programming
- Language: French
- Format: community radio

Ownership
- Owner: Radio Matagami

Technical information
- Class: LP
- ERP: 36 Watts
- HAAT: 15 metres (49 ft)

Links
- Website: www.chef99.ca

CHEF-FM is a Canadian radio station. Owned by Radio Matagami, the station broadcasts a community radio format on 99.9 MHz in Matagami, Quebec. The station was licensed by the Canadian Radio-television and Telecommunications Commission in 2000.

CHEF also has a rebroadcaster, broadcasting on 96.9 FM with the call sign CHEF-FM-3, in Lebel-sur-Quévillon. The station applied to the CRTC in 2006 to add a transmitter at Chibougamau, but was denied because this would have had a negative impact on the financial viability of Chibougamau's CKXO-FM, due to the small size of the market.

The station is a member of the Association des radiodiffuseurs communautaires du Québec.
