= CIEU-FM =

Coordinates: 48°08′27″N 66°06′29″W

Carleton-sur-Mer, Quebec; Canada
- Frequency: 94.9 FM

Programming
- Format: community radio

Ownership
- Owner: Diffusion communautaire Baie-des-Chaleurs

History
- First air date: 1983

Technical information
- Class: C
- ERP: 25.15 kWs average 37.58 kWs peak
- HAAT: 446.5 meters (1,465 ft)

Links
- Website: CIEU Website

CIEU-FM is a french language community radio station that operates at 94.9 FM in Carleton-sur-Mer, Quebec, Canada and is also heard at 106.1 FM in Paspébiac.

The station is currently owned by Diffusion communautaire Baie-des-Chaleurs.

The station is a member of the Association des radiodiffuseurs communautaires du Québec.
