= CIHO-FM =

Radio station in Saint-Hilarion, Quebec

Coordinates: 47°34′02″N 70°24′35″W

- Saint-Hilarion, Quebec; Canada
- Frequency: 96.3 MHz
- Branding: CIHO FM Charlevoix

Programming
- Format: community radio

Ownership
- Owner: Radio MF Charlevoix

History
- First air date: October 10, 1986

Technical information
- Class: B
- ERP: 2.45 kWs
- HAAT: 265.5 meters (871 ft)

Links
- Website: cihofm.com

CIHO-FM is a French language community radio station that broadcasts at 96.3 FM in Saint-Hilarion, Quebec, Canada. Its network of five transmitters serves the Charlevoix and Charlevoix-Est RCMs in the Capitale-Nationale region northeast of Quebec City.

Owned by Radio MF Charlevoix, the station was licensed in 1985.

On August 28, 2009, Radio MF Charlevoix received CRTC approval for a new French language Class B community FM radio station in Saint-Hilarion, with repeaters in La Malbaie, Baie-Saint-Paul, Petite-Rivière-Saint-François and Saint-Siméon; this license, which was not consummated and expired in August 2011, would have replaced the previous license for the station held by Radio MF Charlevoix.

The station is a member of the Association des radiodiffuseurs communautaires du Québec.

== Transmitters ==
Rebroadcasters of CIHO-FM
| City of licence | Identifier | Frequency | Power | Class | RECNet | CRTC Decision |
|---|---|---|---|---|---|---|
| Baie-Saint-Paul | CIHO-FM-2 | 92.1 FM | 50 watts | LP | Query | 89-8 |
| La Malbaie | CIHO-FM-1 | 105.9 FM | 100 watts | A1 | Query | 88-55 |
| Petite-Rivière-Saint François | CIHO-FM-3 | 88.1 FM | 50 watts | LP | Query | 2003-459 |
| Saint-Siméon | CIHO-FM-4 | 88.1 FM | 93 watts | A1 | Query | |
