= CHLC-FM =

Radio station in Baie-Comeau, Quebec

Coordinates: 49°13′59″N 68°08′30″W

Baie-Comeau, Quebec; Canada
- Frequency: 97.1 MHz

Programming
- Language: French
- Format: hot adult contemporary

Ownership
- Owner: 9022-6242 Quebec Inc.

Technical information
- Class: B
- ERP: 4.207 kW
- HAAT: 91.5 metres (300 ft)
- Repeaters: CFRP-FM 100.5 Forestville (3.374 kW ERP/6 kW peak, 60.6 m HAAT)

Links
- Website: www.chlc.com

CHLC-FM is a Class B FM station broadcasting on the frequency of 97.1 MHz using an omnidirectional antenna. The station has a hot adult contemporary format.

CHLC-FM operates a rebroadcaster in Forestville, namely CFRP-FM which broadcasts on 100.5 MHz using a directional antenna with an average effective radiated power of 3,374 watts and a peak effective radiated power of 6,000 watts (class A).

Both stations were previously on the AM band. CHLC was on 580 kHz until 1996, and CFRP was on 620 kHz until 2005.
