= CFNJ-FM =

Radio station in Lanaudière, Quebec, Canada

Coordinates: 46°20′56″N 73°29′49″W

- Lanaudière, Quebec; Canada
- Frequency: 99.1 FM

Ownership
- Owner: Radio Nord-Joli Inc.

History
- First air date: 1985

Technical information
- Class: B1
- ERP: 9.75 kW
- HAAT: 83.9 meters (275 ft)

Links
- Webcast: CFNJ – Live Stream Radio
- Website: CFNJ Website

CFNJ-FM is a Canadian radio station that operates at 99.1 FM in Saint-Gabriel-de-Brandon, Quebec. The station is also heard at 88.9 FM in Saint-Zénon, Quebec.

Owned by Radio Nord-Joli inc., the station was licensed in 1983 and began broadcasting in 1985.

The station is a member of the Association des radiodiffuseurs communautaires du Québec.
