= Petite-Vallée =

- Municipality
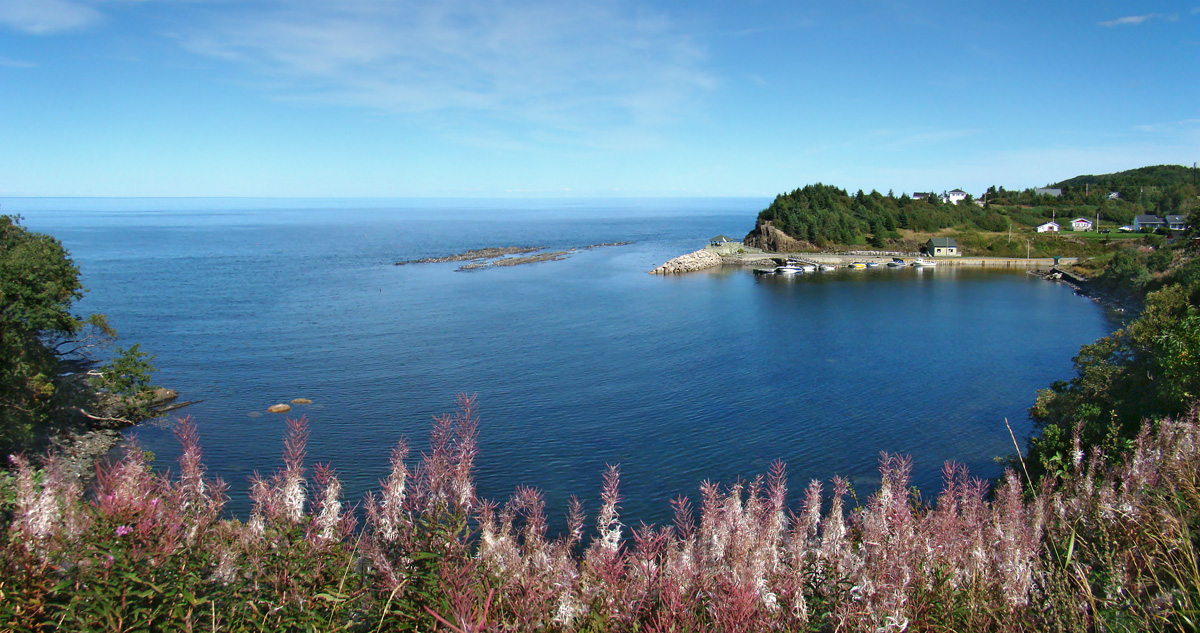
- Motto: À votre portée
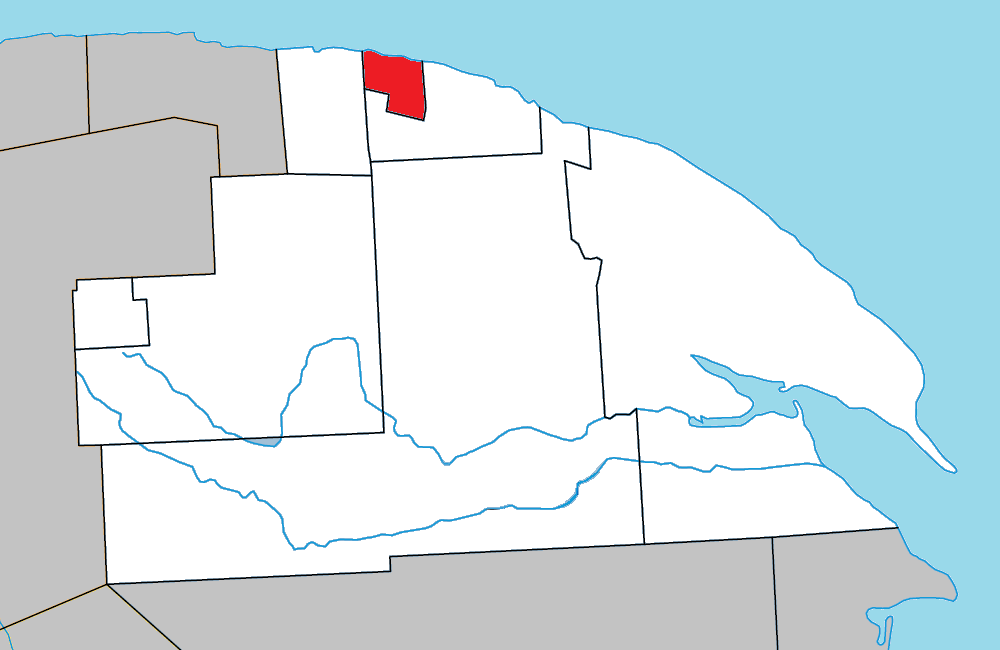
- Location within La Côte-de-Gaspé RCM

- Location in eastern Quebec
- Coordinates: 49°13′N 65°02′W
- Country: Canada
- Province: Quebec
- Region: Gaspésie–Îles-de-la-Madeleine
- RCM: La Côte-de-Gaspé
- Settled: 1858
- Constituted: January 1, 1957

Government
  - Mayor: Monika Tait
  - Federal riding: Gaspésie—Les Îles-de-la-Madeleine—Listuguj
  - Prov. riding: Gaspé

Area
  - Total: 40.82 km^{2} (15.76 sq mi)
  - Land: 39.90 km^{2} (15.41 sq mi)

Population (2021)
  - Total: 157
  - Density: 3.9/km^{2} (10/sq mi)
  - Pop (2016-21): ▼7.6%
  - Dwellings: 98
- Time zone: UTC−5 (EST)
  - Summer (DST): UTC−4 (EDT)
- Postal code(s): G0E 1Y0
- Area codes: 418 and 581
- Highways: R-132
- Website: www.petitevallee.ca

Petite-Vallée (French pronunciation: [pətit vale]) is a municipality in the Gaspésie-Îles-de-la-Madeleine region of the province of Quebec in Canada.

Its name (French for "Little Valley") describes its location in the hollow of a shallow valley, and dates back to at least 1754 when it appeared on a map by Jacques-Nicolas Bellin.

== History ==
The first settlers were two families from Montmagny, who arrived in 1858, and built their homes at the mouth of the Petite Vallée River. Two years later, the first bridge over the river was constructed. Around 1870, clearing was done for the coastal road. In 1885, its post office opened, and in 1890, a second bridge over the Petite-Vallée River was built.

The municipality was formed in 1957 when it separated from the Township Municipality of Cloridorme.

== Demographics ==
=== Population ===
Canada census – Petite-Vallée community profile

	2021	2016	2011
Population	157 (-7.6% from 2016)	170 (-4.5% from 2011)	178 (-28.2% from 2006)
Land area	39.90 km^{2} (15.41 sq mi)	39.94 km^{2} (15.42 sq mi)	39.28 km^{2} (15.17 sq mi)
Population density	3.9/km^{2} (10/sq mi)	4.3/km^{2} (11/sq mi)	4.5/km^{2} (12/sq mi)
Median age	62.8 (M: 61.6, F: 62.8)	58.5 (M: 58.4, F: 58.6)	56.0 (M: 57.0, F: 55.0)
Private dwellings	98 (total) 82 (occupied)	91 (total) 83 (occupied)	97 (total)
Median household income	$.N/A	$43,477	$.N/A

Notes: Income data for this area has been suppressed for data quality or confidentiality reasons.
References: 2021 2016 2011

Historical Census Data - Petite-Vallée, Quebec

Year	Pop.	±%
1961	455	—
1966	440	−3.3%
1971	420	−4.5%
1976	353	−16.0%
1981	332	−5.9%
1986	296	−10.8%
1991	226	−23.6%

Year	Pop.	±%
1996	224	−0.9%
2001	216	−3.6%
2006	248	+14.8%
2011	178	−28.2%
2016	170	−4.5%
2021	157	−7.6%

Source: Statistics Canada

=== Language ===
Canada Census Mother Tongue - Petite-Vallée, Quebec
Census	Total	French			English			French & English			Other		
Year	Responses	Count	Trend	Pop %	Count	Trend	Pop %	Count	Trend	Pop %	Count	Trend	Pop %
2021	155	150	▼11.8%	96.8%	5	0.0%	3.2%	0	0.0%	0.0%	0	0.0%	0.0%
2016	170	170	▼2.9%	100.0%	5	▲ n/a%	2.9%	0	0.0%	0.0%	0	0.0%	0.0%
2011	175	175	▼32.7%	100.0%	0	0.0%	0.0%	0	0.0%	0.0%	0	0.0%	0.0%
2006	260	260	▲15.5%	100.0%	0	0.0%	0.0%	0	0.0%	0.0%	0	0.0%	0.0%
2001	225	225	▲15.4%	100.0%	0	0.0%	0.0%	0	0.0%	0.0%	0	0.0%	0.0%
1996	195	195	n/a	100.0%	0	n/a	0.0%	0	n/a	0.0%	0	n/a	0.0%

== See also ==
- List of municipalities in Quebec
