= CFTH-FM-1 =

Community radio station in Quebec, Canada

Coordinates: 50°29′35.88″N 59°28′45.84″W

- Harrington Harbour, Quebec; Canada
- Frequency: 97.7 MHz
- Branding: CFTH Radio

Programming
- Language: English
- Format: community radio

Ownership
- Owner: Radio communautaire de Harrington Harbour

Technical information
- Licensing authority: CRTC
- Class: A
- ERP: 1,023 watts (horiz.)
- HAAT: 26 metres (85 ft)

Links
- Website: www.cfthradio.com

CFTH-FM-1 is an English language community radio station that broadcasts on 97.7 FM in Harrington Harbour, Quebec, Canada. CFTH is owned by Radio communautaire de Harrington Harbour.

== History ==
The radio station originally dates back to 1985, when it was incorporated. It was not until January 21, 1991, that CFTH-FM began broadcasting over the airwaves.

On November 5, 2019, Radio communautaire de Harrington Harbour has requested to revoke its broadcast licence for CFTH-FM-1 Harrington Harbour and its transmitters CFTH-FM-2 Mutton Bay and CFTH-FM-3 Kegaska.

== Transmitters ==
Rebroadcasters of CFTH-FM-1
City of licence	Identifier	Frequency	Power	Class	RECNet	CRTC Decision
Baie-des-Moutons	CFTH-FM-2	98.5 FM	145 watts	A	Query	
Kegaska	CFTH-FM-3	89.9 FM	10 watts		Query	93-35; 2016-288

On October 14, 2010, the station applied to add a new FM transmitter at Mutton Bay in order to adequately serve the population of Mutton Bay and La Tabatière. The station received CRTC approval on December 6, 2010, and will operate on the frequency 98.5 MHz.

On July 25, 2016, the CRTC approved Radio communautaire de Harrington's application to operate a rebroadcasting transmitter in Kegaska. The new transmitter will operate at 89.9 MHz (channel 210LP) with an effective radiated power of 10 watts (non-directional antenna with an effective height above average terrain of 10 metres).
