= Val-des-Lacs =

- Municipality
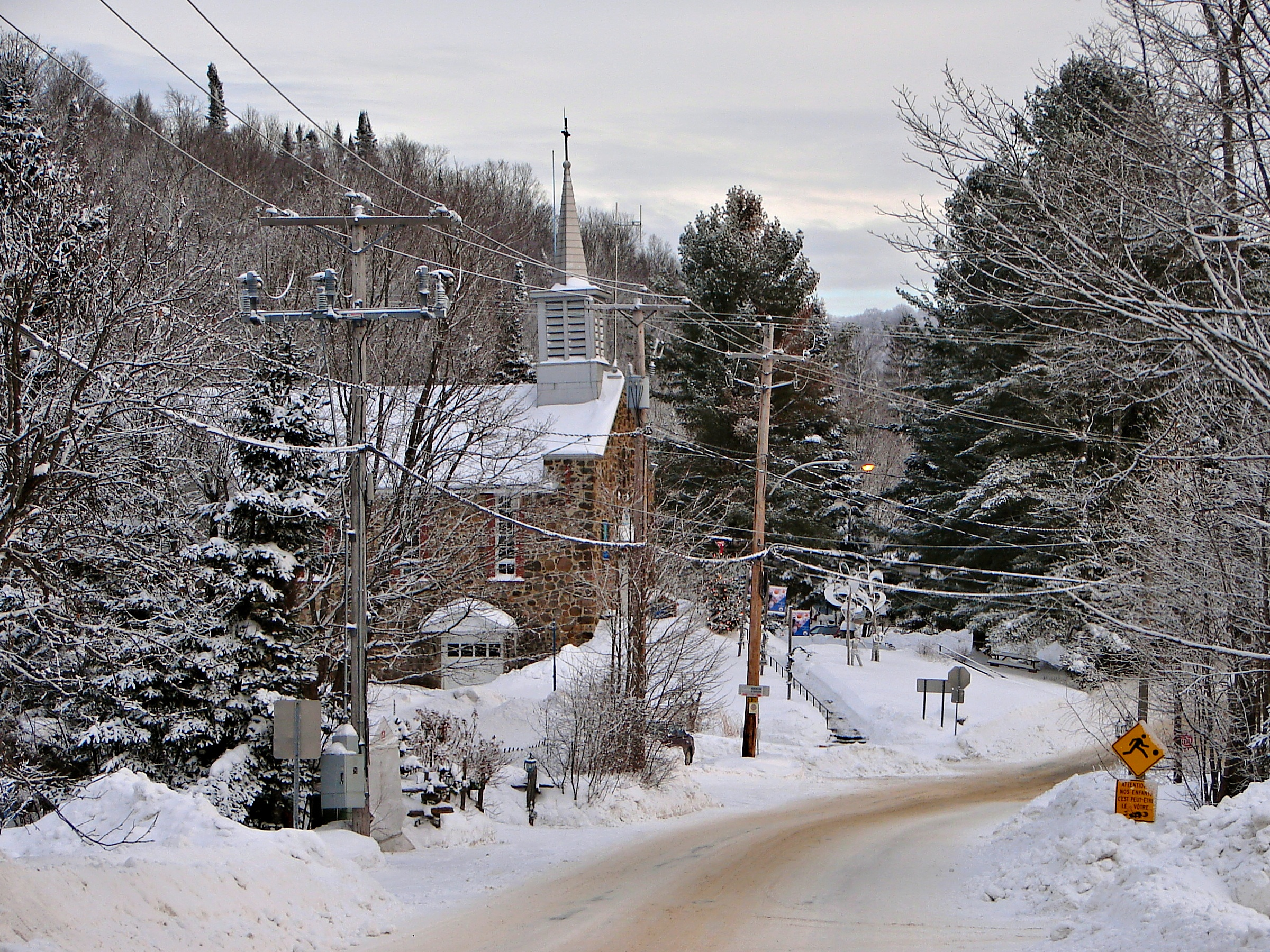
- Motto: Au coeur de la nature (In the heart of nature)
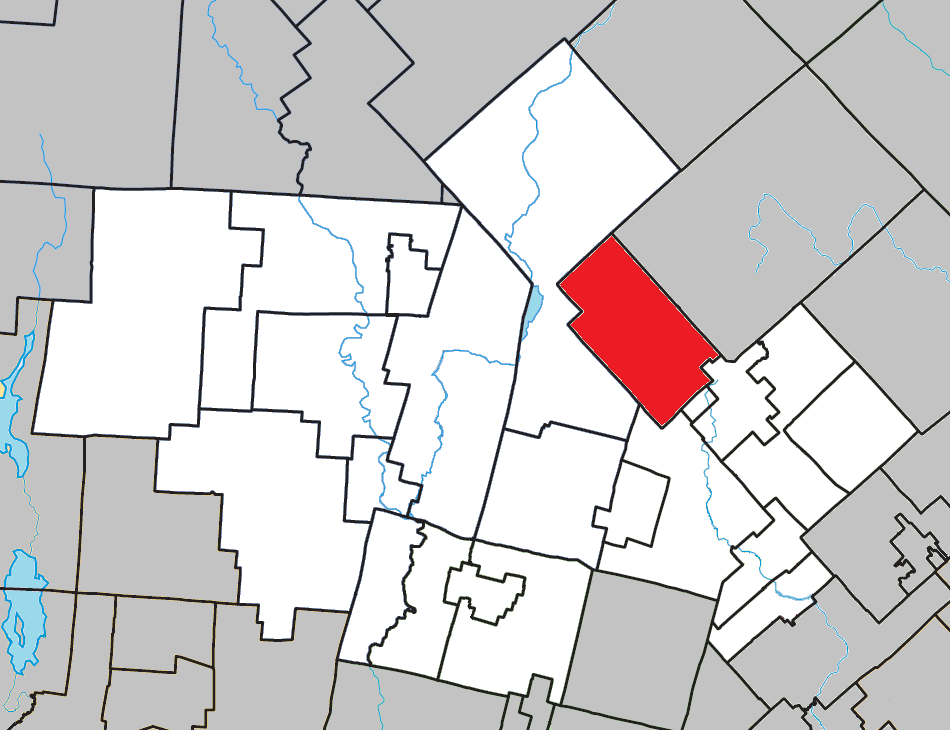
- Location within Les Laurentides RCM

- Location in central Quebec
- Coordinates: 46°11′N 74°21′W
- Country: Canada
- Province: Quebec
- Region: Laurentides
- RCM: Les Laurentides
- Settled: 1890s
- Constituted: February 6, 1932

Government
  - Mayor: Patricia Lacasse
  - Fed. riding: Laurentides—Labelle
  - Prov. riding: Bertrand

Area
  - Total: 131.46 km^{2} (50.76 sq mi)
  - Land: 126.70 km^{2} (48.92 sq mi)

Population (2021)
  - Total: 750
  - Density: 5.9/km^{2} (15/sq mi)
  - Change 2016-21: ▲0.8%
  - Dwellings: 822
- Time zone: UTC−5 (EST)
  - Summer (DST): UTC−4 (EDT)
- Postal code(s): J0T 2P0
- Area code(s): 819
- Highways: No major routes
- Website: www.val-des-lacs.ca

Val-des-Lacs (French pronunciation: [val de lak]; meaning "Valley of Lakes") is a municipality of 750 peoples in the Laurentides region of Quebec, Canada, part of the Les Laurentides Regional County Municipality.

== History ==
The area was settled at the end of the 19th century, and its post office opened in 1894. In 1928, the Parish of Saint-Agricole was created; its name referring to the agricultural character of the area. In 1932, the Municipality of Saint-Agricole was established when it separated from the Township of Wolfe (now Lac-Supérieur).

With the decline of agriculture and the rise of tourism in the area, the municipality was renamed to Val-des-Lacs on June 17, 1967.

== Demographics ==
Historical census populations – Val-des-Lacs

Year	Pop.	±%
1941	399	—
1951	420	+5.3%
1956	388	−7.6%
1961	374	−3.6%
1966	274	−26.7%
1971	330	+20.4%
1976	400	+21.2%
1981	425	+6.2%

Year	Pop.	±%
1986	483	+13.6%
1991	495	+2.5%
1996	627	+26.7%
2001	685	+9.3%
2006	778	+13.6%
2011	721	−7.3%
2016	744	+3.2%
2021	750	+0.8%

Source: Statistics Canada

Private dwellings occupied by usual residents (2021): 391 (total dwellings: 822)

Mother tongue (2021):

- English as first language: 4.7%
- French as first language: 93.3%
- English and French as first languages: 0.7%
- Other as first language: 2.7%

== Local government ==
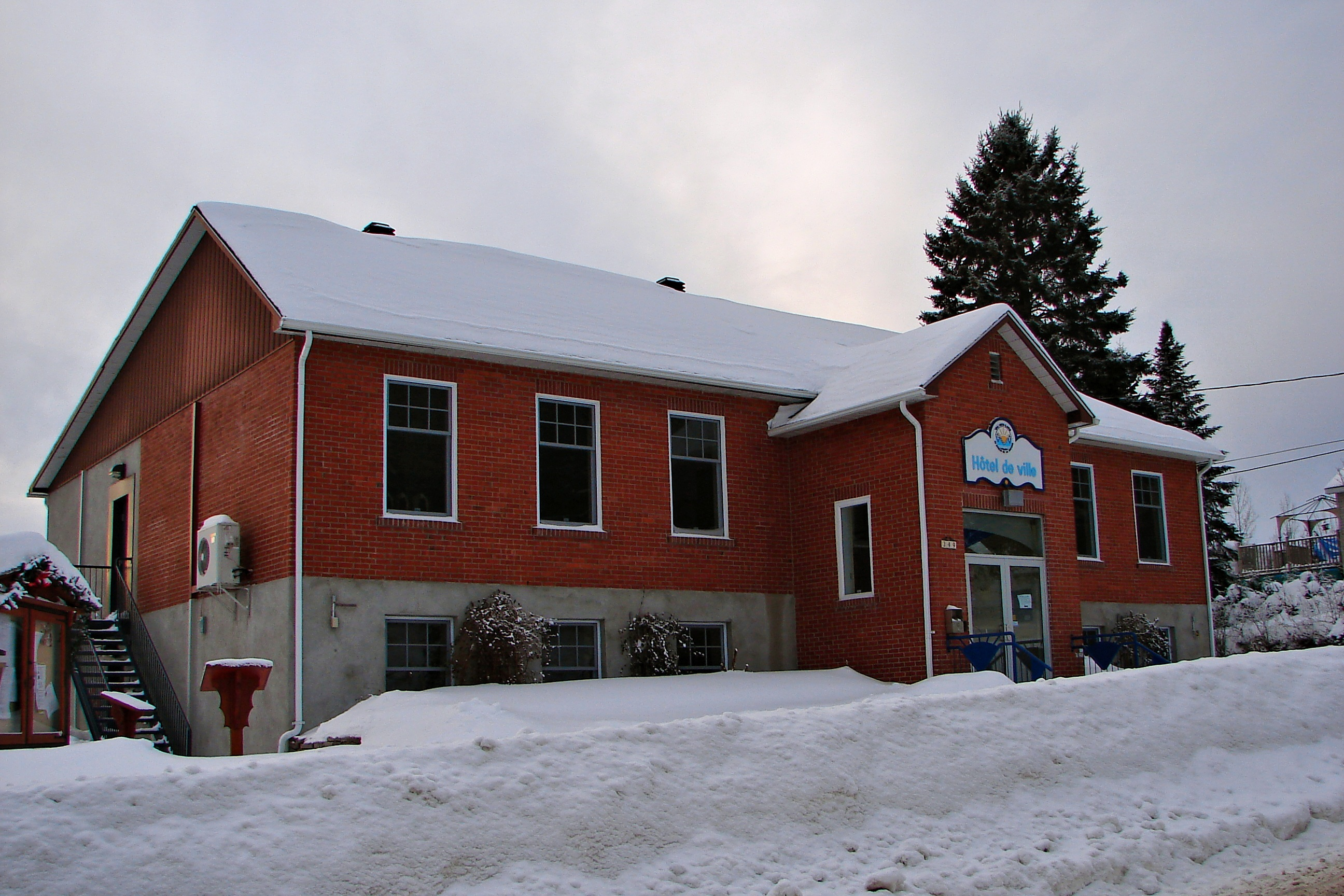
Val-des-Lacs municipal hall

List of former mayors:

- Lizette Piché (...–2005)
- Berthe Bélanger (2005–2013)
- Jean-François Delisle (2013–2017)
- Jean-Philippe Martin (2017–2021)
- Denis Desautels (2021)
- Paul Kushner (2021–2025)
- Patricia Lacasse (2025–present)

== Education ==
Sainte Agathe Academy (of the Sir Wilfrid Laurier School Board) in Sainte-Agathe-des-Monts serves English-speaking students in this community for both elementary and secondary levels.
