= Lac-Simon Anishnabe Nation =

Lac-Simon
- Indian reserve

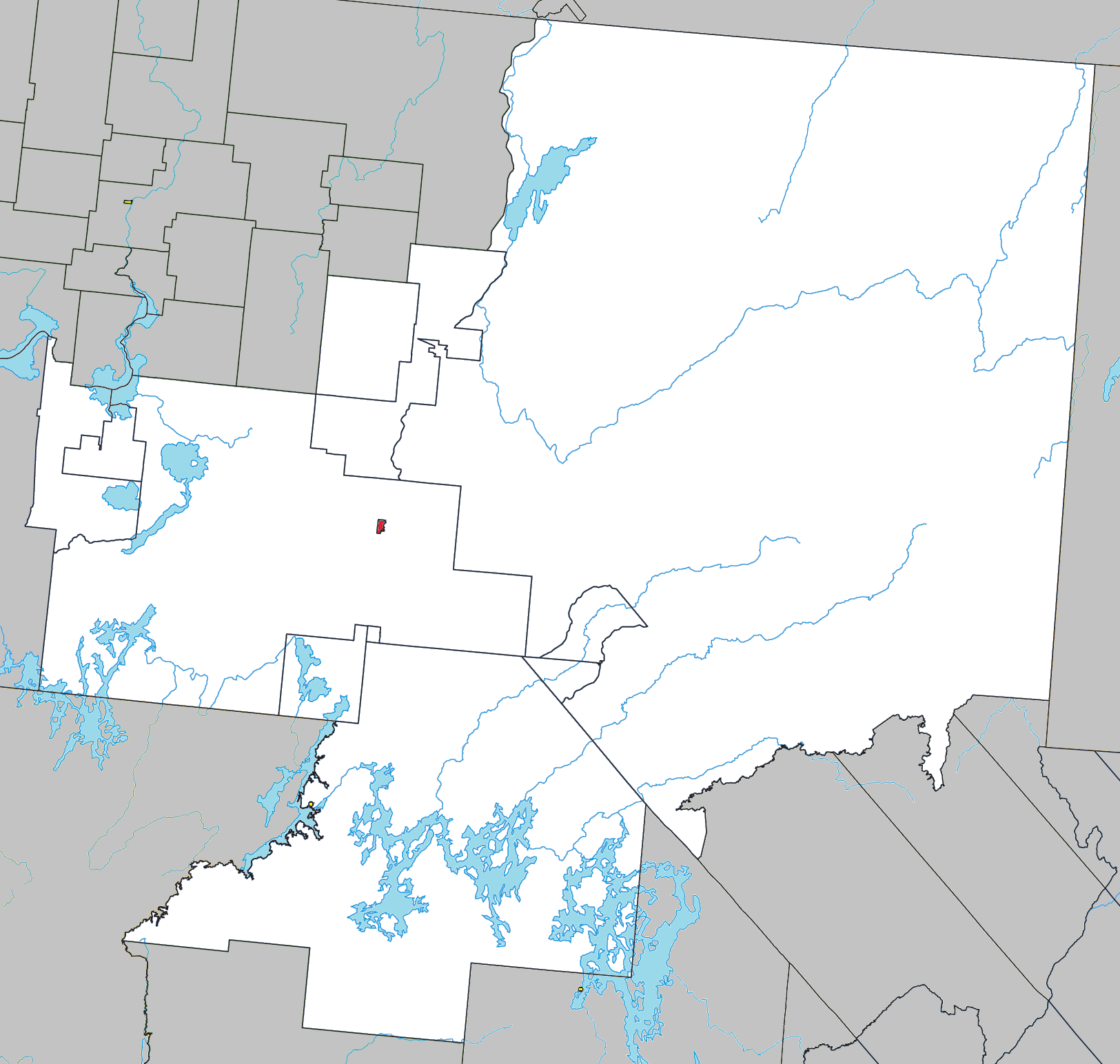
- Location within La Vallée-de-l'Or RCM

- Location in Abitibi-Témiscamingue
- Coordinates: 48°03′21″N 77°21′30″W
- Country: Canada
- Province: Quebec
- Region: Abitibi-Témiscamingue

Government
  - Chief: David Salembier

Area
  - Land: 3.14 km^{2} (1.21 sq mi)

Population (2021)
  - Total: 1,285
- Time zone: UTC−05:00 (EST)
  - Summer (DST): UTC−04:00 (EDT)

Lac-Simon (French pronunciation: [lak simɔ̃]) is a First Nations reserve (also known as Simosagigan) and lake in Abitibi-Témiscamingue, Quebec located 32 km (20 mi) south-east of Val-d'Or. The reserve occupies 678.4 ha (6.784 km^{2}), an on reserve population of 1,285 (2021) and is governed by the Nation anishnabe du Lac Simon.

There are also a number of residential cottages and summer houses around the lake. It is about 24 by 3 km (15 by 2 mi) with a large island containing a smaller pond itself. There are several small islands on it, some of which are large enough to camp on.

Around 1910, the missionary Étienne Blanchin and the Hudson's Bay Company encouraged Algonquin people from Kitcisakik (Grand-Lac-Victoria) to come and establish a community at Lac-Simon. Other Algonquins were then invited to move to Lac-Simon.

In the 1950s, a small Republic RC-3 Seabee with four people on board crashed and sank in very deep water in the lake. In 2007 the aircraft was discovered in 46 m (150 ft) of water.

The return of deer to the area was featured in an episode of Lorne Greene's New Wilderness in the mid-1980s.

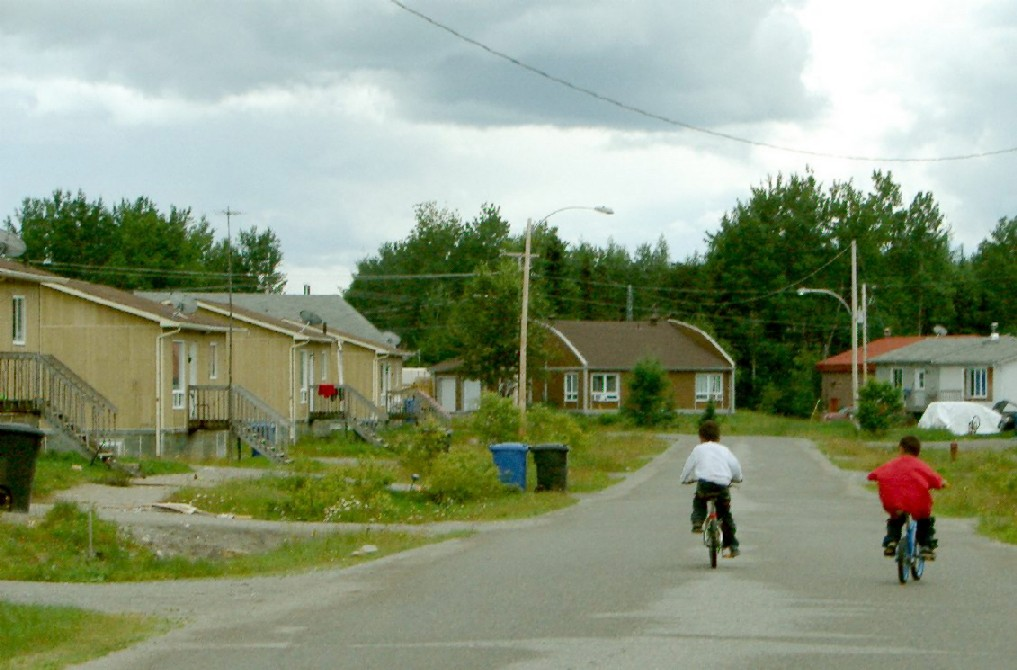
