= CFBS-FM =

Community radio station in Blanc-Sablon, Quebec, Canada

Coordinates: 51°25′17″N 57°10′37″W

- Blanc-Sablon, Quebec; Canada
- Frequency: 89.9 MHz

Programming
- Format: community radio

Ownership
- Owner: Radio Blanc-Sablon

Technical information
- Class: A
- ERP: vertical polarization only: 178 watts average 300 watts peak
- HAAT: 31.6 metres (104 ft)

Links
- Website: www.cfbsradio.ca

CFBS-FM is a community radio station that operates at 89.9 FM in Blanc-Sablon, Quebec, Canada. Owned by Radio Blanc-Sablon, the station was licensed in 1986.

The station is a member of the Association des radiodiffuseurs communautaires du Québec.

On November 30, 2020, Radio Blanc-Sablon inc. received approval to change the station’s authorized contours by increasing the maximum effective radiated power (ERP) from 300 to 900 watts, increasing the average ERP from 178 to 900 watts, replacing the existing directional antenna with a non-directional antenna, increasing the effective height of the antenna above average terrain from 31.6 to 40.25 meters, and amending the existing coordinates of the transmitter site.

== Rebroadcasters ==
The station also operates on the following transmitters:

Rebroadcasters of CFBS-FM
City of licence	Identifier	Frequency	RECNet	CRTC Decision
Bonne-Espérance	CFBS-FM-1	93.1	Query	89-511
Bonne-Espérance	CFBS-FM-2	93.1	Query	
L'Anse-au-Clair, Newfoundland and Labrador	CFBS-FM-3	105.3	Query	2023-333

On October 4, 2023, the Canadian Radio-television and Telecommunications Commission (CRTC) approved an application by Radio Blanc-Sablon inc. to add a new FM transmitter that will operate at 105.3 MHz in L'Anse-au-Clair, Newfoundland and Labrador.
