= Cloridorme =

- Township municipality
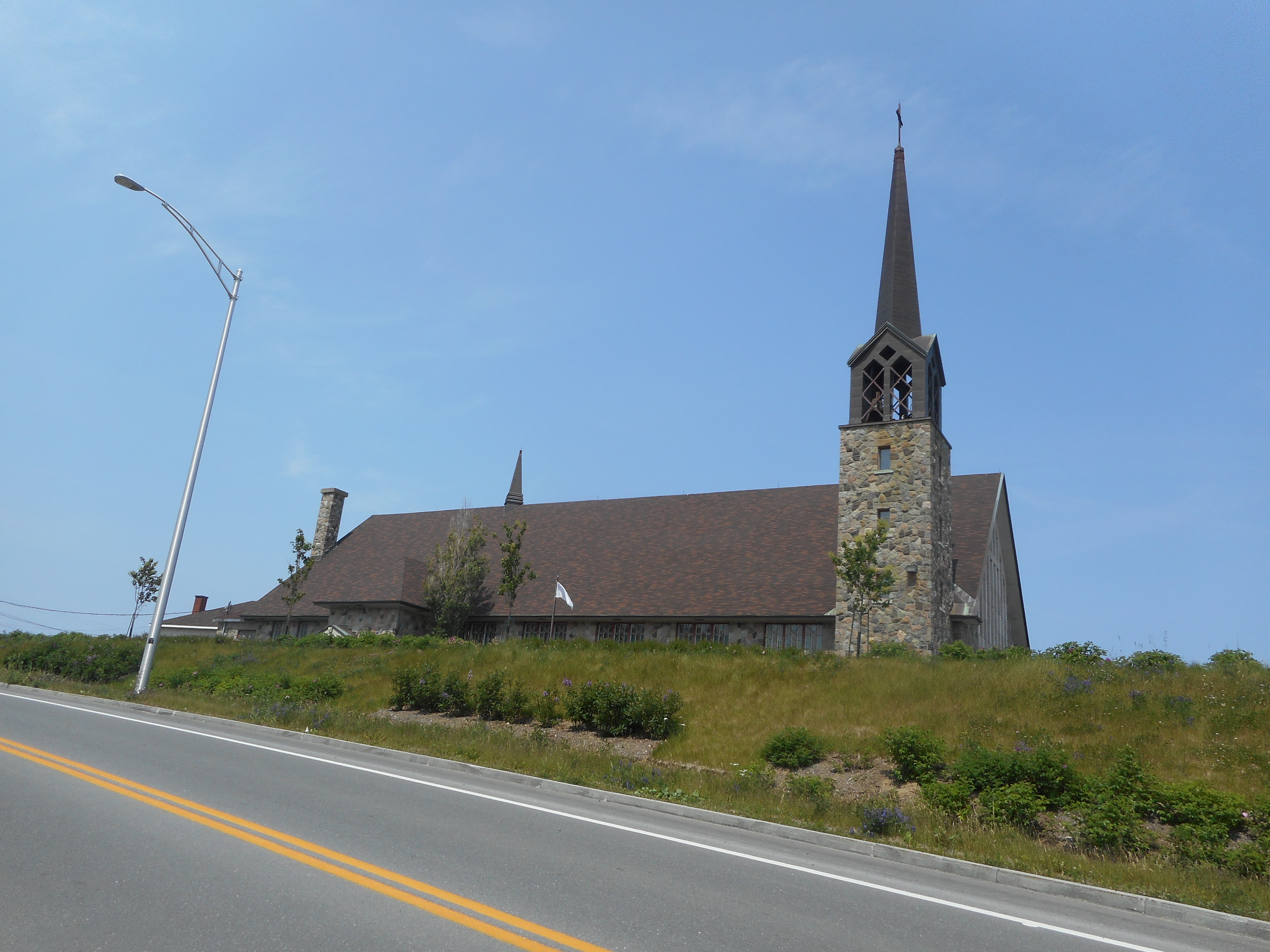
- Saint Cecile Church in Cloridorme

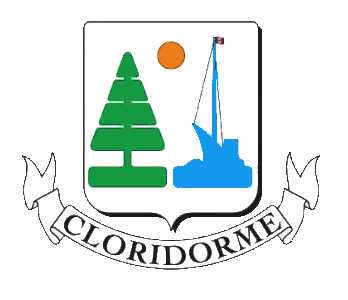
- Coat of arms

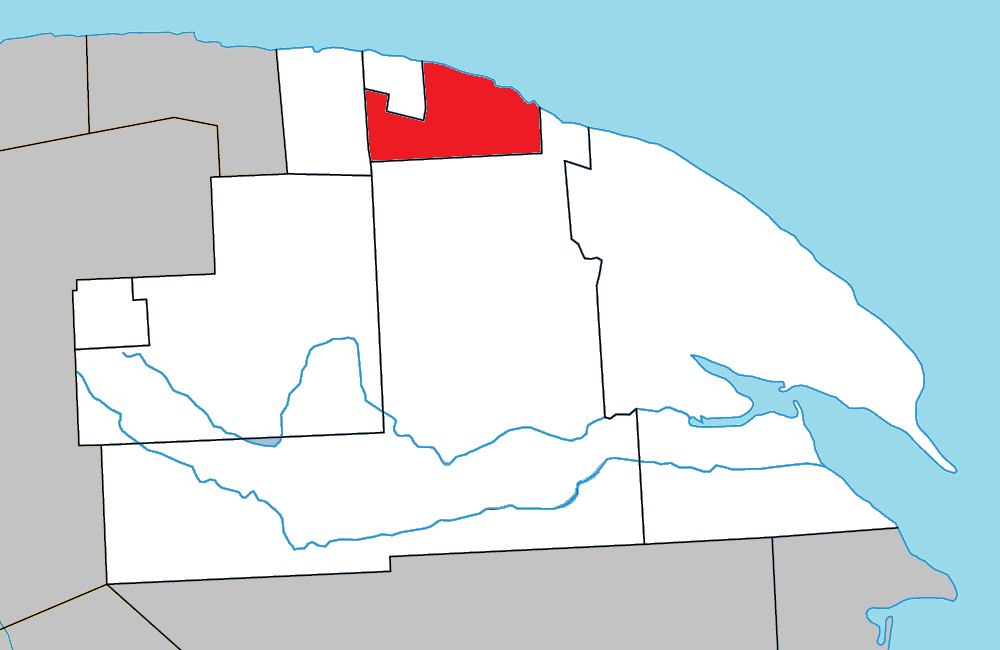
- Location within La Côte-de-Gaspé RCM

- Location in eastern Quebec
- Coordinates: 49°11′N 64°50′W
- Country: Canada
- Province: Quebec
- Region: Gaspésie– Îles-de-la-Madeleine
- RCM: La Côte-de-Gaspé
- Settled: 1838
- Constituted: January 1, 1885

Government
  - Mayor: Marcel Mainville
  - Federal riding: Gaspésie—Les Îles-de-la-Madeleine—Listuguj
  - Prov. riding: Gaspé

Area
  - Total: 161.42 km^{2} (62.32 sq mi)
  - Land: 158.74 km^{2} (61.29 sq mi)

Population (2021)
  - Total: 607
  - Density: 3.8/km^{2} (9.8/sq mi)
  - Pop (2016-21): ▼9.5%
  - Dwellings: 382
- Time zone: UTC−5 (EST)
  - Summer (DST): UTC−4 (EDT)
- Postal code(s): G0E 1G0
- Area codes: 418 and 581
- Highways: R-132
- Website: canton-de-cloridorme.com

Cloridorme (French pronunciation: [klɔʁidɔʁm]) is a township municipality in the Gaspé Peninsula, Quebec, Canada. Cloridorme's economy is centred on fishing. Its population, according to the 2021 Canadian Census was 607. The township stretches for 16 kilometres (10 mi) along the Gulf of Saint Lawrence and includes Cloridorme Bay where the Little and Great Cloridorme Rivers have their mouths.

In addition to the village of Cloridorme itself, the township's territory also includes the communities of Cloridorme-Ouest, Petite-Anse, Pointe-à-la-Frégate, and Saint-Yvon.

== Etymology ==
Archival documents indicate that "Chlorydormes" was a place in the Jersey Islands, near the village of St John. Emigrants from Jersey have contributed to the primary population of the Gaspé area, including Cloridorme that was settled by a community of fishermen from Jersey. In particular, a certain Lewis Gibaut, friend of Georges Godfray of Grand-Étang (a neighboring village of Cloridorme) and who worked for William Hyman and Sons, returned to die in Chlorydormes, St-John, Jersey.

The name has been in use since at least the middle of the 18th-century, as indicated by its use on a map of 1755, and by the 19th-century, the name Les Chlorydormes was used for 2 bays on the coast (now Cloridorme Bay and Petit-Cloridorme Cove where the Grand-Cloridorme and Petit-Cloridorme Rivers empty into the St. Lawrence respectively). The spelling modification and change from plural to singular occurred at the end of the 19th century.

== History ==
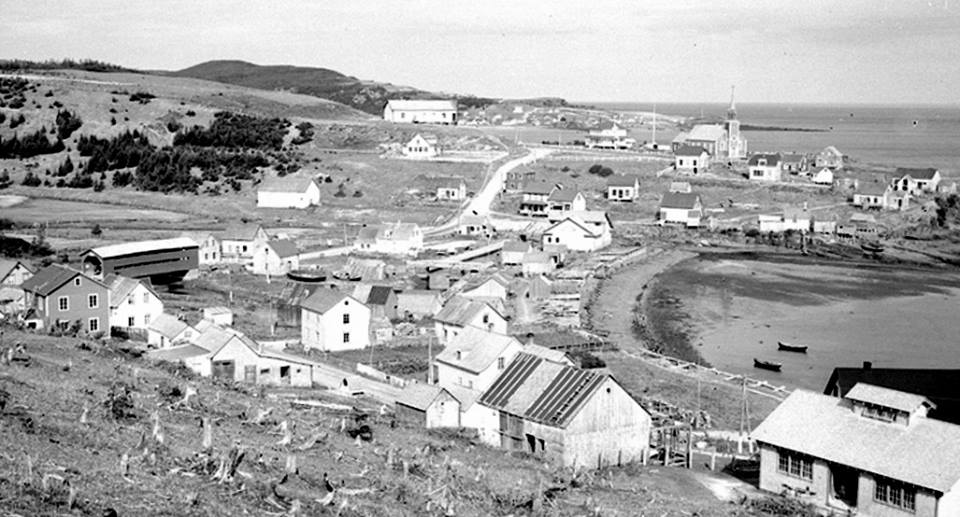
Village of Cloridorme in 1940

The area was first settled in 1838 by people from Montmagny. In 1853, a mission was set up, called Sainte-Cécile-de-Cloridorme. In 1871, the geographic township was formed, the following year the post office opened (called Chlorydormes, and changed to Cloridorme in 1921), and the year after that, the mission became a parish. In 1885, the Township Municipality of Cloridorme was established.

In 1957, the township lost a portion of its territory when Petite-Vallée became a separate incorporated municipality.

== Demographics ==
In the 2021 Census of Population conducted by Statistics Canada, Cloridorme had a population of 607 living in 315 of its 382 total private dwellings, a change of −9.5% from its 2016 population of 671. With a land area of 158.74 km^{2} (61.29 sq mi), it had a population density of 3.8/km^{2} (9.9/sq mi) in 2021.

Canada census – Cloridorme community profile

	2021	2016	2011
Population	607 (-9.5% from 2016)	671 (-9.7% from 2011)	743 (-2.7% from 2006)
Land area	158.74 km^{2} (61.29 sq mi)	159.62 km^{2} (61.63 sq mi)	160.22 km^{2} (61.86 sq mi)
Population density	3.8/km^{2} (9.8/sq mi)	4.2/km^{2} (11/sq mi)	4.6/km^{2} (12/sq mi)
Median age	61.6 (M: 61.6, F: 62.4)	58.5 (M: 58.3, F: 58.8)	55.0 (M: 53.9, F: 55.5)
Private dwellings	382 (total) 315 (occupied)	397 (total) 336 (occupied)	412 (total)
Median household income	$55,200	$44,800	$36,768

References: 2021 2016 2011

Historical Census Data - Cloridorme, Quebec

Year	Pop.	±%
1891	647	—
1901	785	+21.3%
1911	999	+27.3%
1921	953	−4.6%
1931	834	−12.5%
1941	1,437	+72.3%
1951	1,644	+14.4%

Year	Pop.	±%
1956	1,722	+4.7%
1961	1,275	−26.0%
1966	1,600	+25.5%
1971	1,452	−9.3%
1976	1,370	−5.6%
1981	1,389	+1.4%
1986	1,318	−5.1%

Year	Pop.	±%
1991	1,166	−11.5%
1996	1,084	−7.0%
2001	917	−15.4%
2006	764	−16.7%
2011	743	−2.7%
2016	671	−9.7%
2021	607	−9.5%

Population counts are not adjusted for boundary changes.
Source: Statistics Canada

Canada Census Mother Tongue - Cloridorme, Quebec
Census	Total	French			English			French & English			Other		
Year	Responses	Count	Trend	Pop %	Count	Trend	Pop %	Count	Trend	Pop %	Count	Trend	Pop %
2021	605	600	▼9.8%	99.2%	5	▲ n/a%	0.8%	0	▼100.0%	0.0%	0	0.0%	0.0%
2016	670	665	▼10.1%	99.3%	0	0.0%	0.0%	5	▲ n/a%	0.7%	0	0.0%	0.0%
2011	740	740	▼2.0%	100.0%	0	▼100.0%	0.0%	0	0.0%	0.0%	0	0.0%	0.0%
2006	765	755	▼16.6%	98.69%	10	▲ n/a%	1.31%	0	0.0%	0.0%	0	0.0%	0.0%
2001	905	905	▼11.3%	97.26%	0	0.0%	0.0%	0	0.0%	0.0%	0	0.0%	0.0%
1996	1,090	1,090	n/a	100.0%	0	n/a	0.0%	0	n/a	0.0%	0	n/a	0.0%

== Government ==
List of former mayors:

- Cyprien Labrecque (1885–1892, 1893–1894)
- Louis Guillemette (1892–1893, 1894–1902)
- Cyrias Coulombe (1902–1903, 1908–1909)
- Richard Mercier (1903–1904)
- Pierre Bélanger (1904–1905)
- Jean Baptiste Bernatchez (1905–1908)
- Adelme Coulombe (1909–1911)
- Alphonse Caron (1911–1917)
- François Coulombe (1917–1921, 1925–1934)
- Pierre Côté (1921–1925)
- Philippe Guillemette (1934–1937)
- Romuald Coulombe (1937–1943)
- Eustache Beaudoin (1943–1949)
- Étienne Beaudoin (1949–1961, 1962–1963)
- Onias Côté (1961–1962)
- J. Alphège Florian Francoeur (1963–1968)
- Marc Bernatchez (1968–1971)
- J. Léo Fiola (1971–1979)
- Guy Gleeton (1979–1994)
- Réal Gasse (1994–2005)
- Jocelyne Huet (2005–2017)
- Denis Fortin (2017–2021)
- Pierre Martin (2021–2023)
- Marcel Mainville (2023–2025)
- Nancy Cloutier (2025-present)

== See also ==
- List of township municipalities in Quebec
