= Rivière-au-Renard =

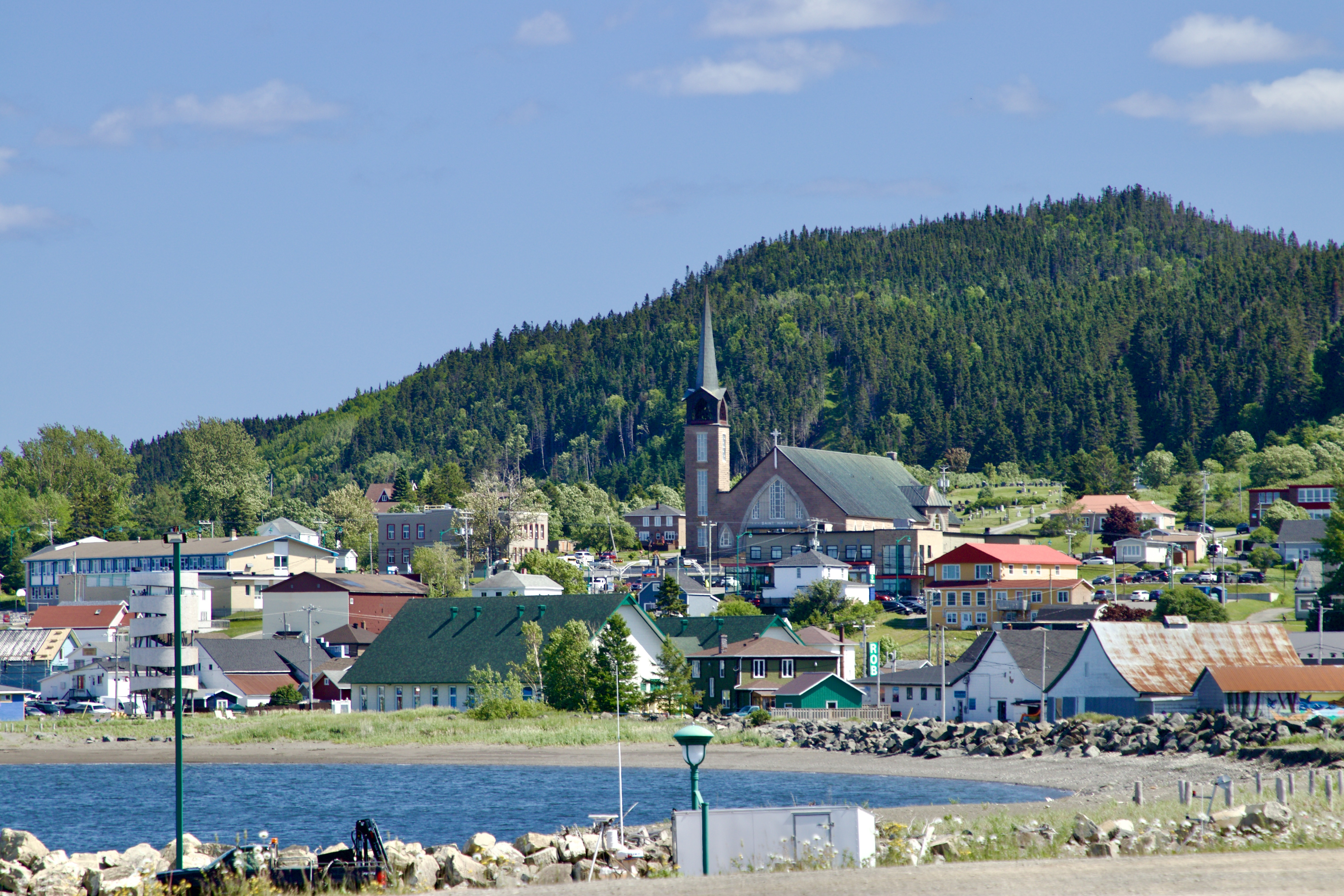
- Rivière-au-Renard showing the port

- Location within Eastern Quebec
- Coordinates: 48°59′30″N 64°23′00″W
- Country: Canada
- Province: Quebec
- Region: Gaspésie–Îles-de-la-Madeleine
- Municipality: Gaspé
- Incorporated: 1856
- Amalgamated: 1971

Population
  - Total: 3,000
- Time zone: UTC-5 (EST)
  - Summer (DST): UTC-4 (EDT)
- Area code: 418

Rivière-au-Renard (French pronunciation: [ʁivjɛʁ o ʁənaʁ]) (traditionally known in English as Fox River) is a former municipality in the Gaspé Peninsula, in the province of Quebec, Canada, now part of the Town of Gaspé.

Originally settled in the 1790s by French-Canadian and Irish families, Rivière-au-Renard is located on the banks of a large open bay on the Gulf of Saint Lawrence at the eastern end of the Gaspé Peninsula. The town was originally populated by immigrants from Ireland, mostly those who remained in the area following the sinking of the Carrick in 1847.

In 1971, this former municipality was amalgamated into the Town of Gaspé.

== Notable people ==
- Laurence Jalbert, singer
- Cédric Paquette, NHL hockey player
