= Grande-Vallée =

- Municipality
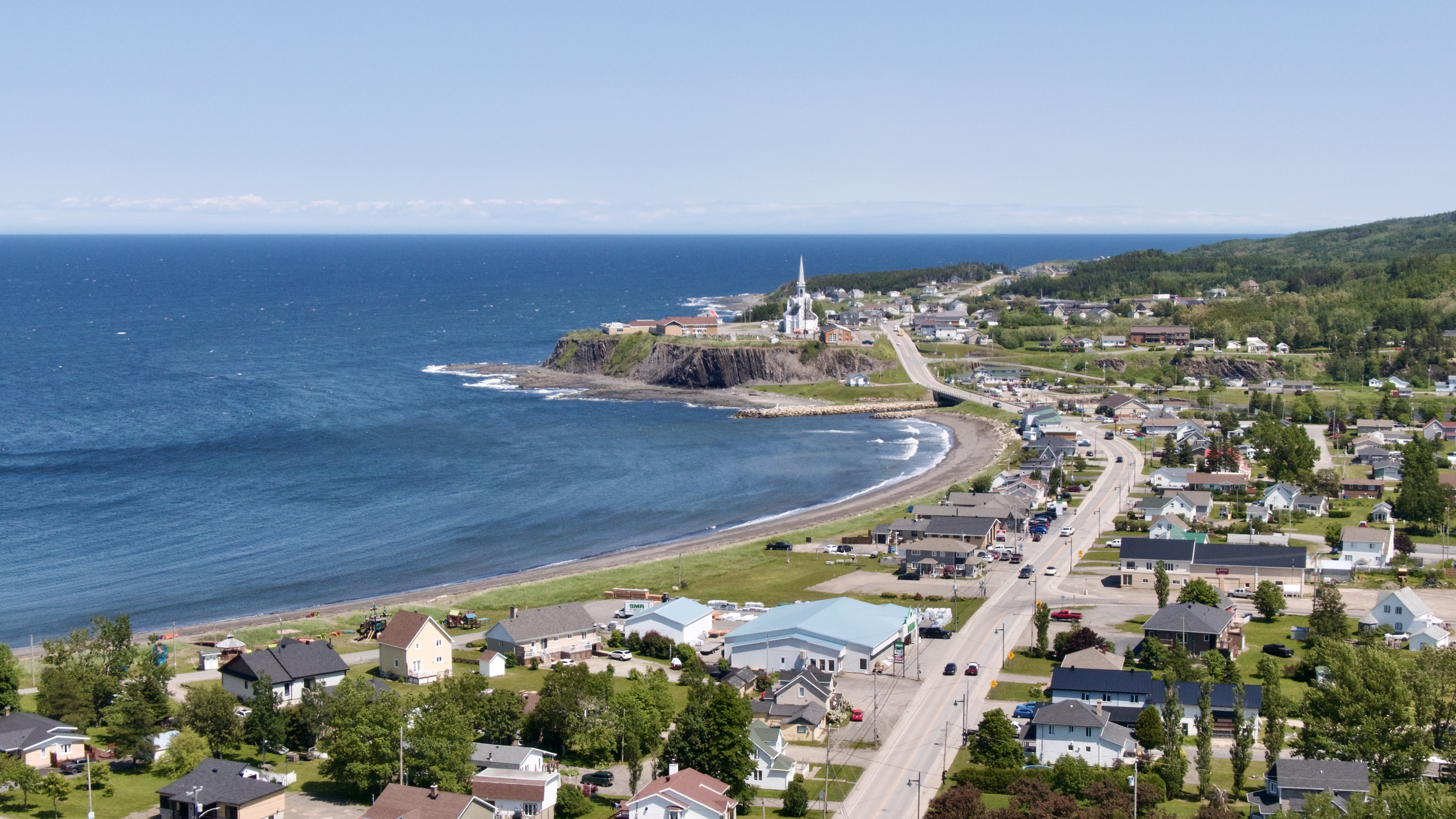
- Grande-Vallée skyline

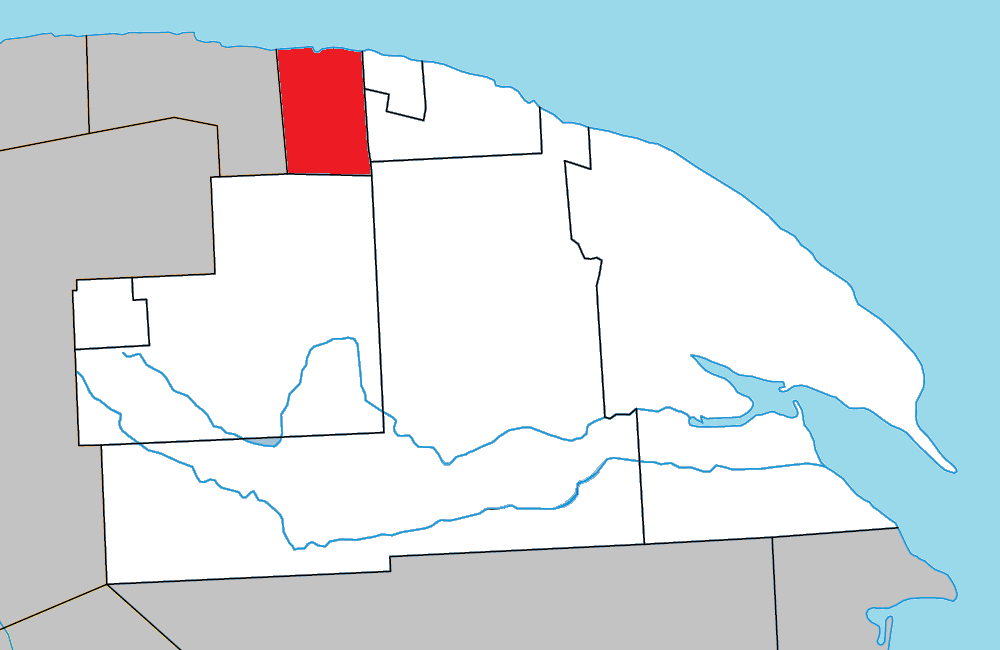
- Location within La Côte-de-Gaspé RCM

- Location in eastern Quebec
- Coordinates: 49°13′N 65°08′W
- Country: Canada
- Province: Quebec
- Region: Gaspésie–Îles-de-la-Madeleine
- RCM: La Côte-de-Gaspé
- Settled: 1842
- Constituted: September 15, 1927

Government
  - Mayor: Noel Richard
  - Federal riding: Gaspésie—Les Îles-de-la-Madeleine—Listuguj
  - Prov. riding: Gaspé

Area
  - Total: 144.86 km^{2} (55.93 sq mi)
  - Land: 144.16 km^{2} (55.66 sq mi)

Population (2021)
  - Total: 1,077
  - Density: 7.5/km^{2} (19/sq mi)
  - Pop (2016-21): ▲1.9%
  - Dwellings: 595
- Time zone: UTC−5 (EST)
  - Summer (DST): UTC−4 (EDT)
- Postal code(s): G0E 1K0
- Area codes: 418 and 581
- Highways: R-132
- Website: www.grande-vallee.ca

Grande-Vallée (French pronunciation: [ɡʁɑ̃d vale]) is a municipality in the Gaspésie-Îles-de-la-Madeleine region of the province of Quebec in Canada.

Its name (French for "Great Valley") describes its location in a large fertile valley through which the Grand Vallée River flows.

== History ==
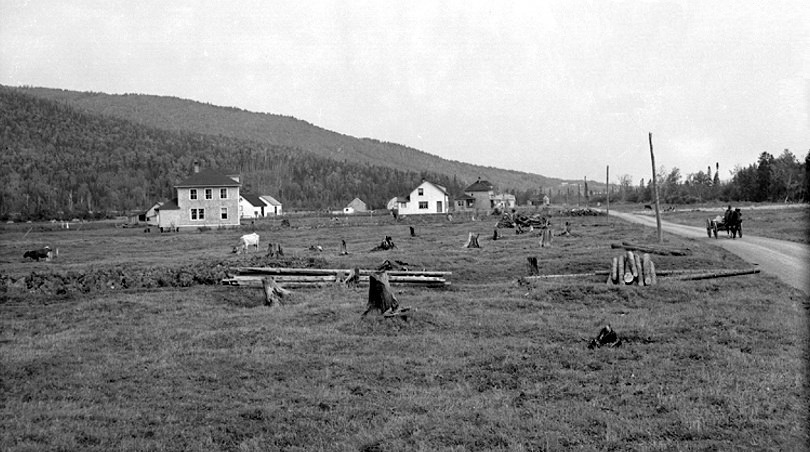
View of the colony of Grande-Vallée in 1943

In 1691, Governor General Frontenac granted the area to François Hazeur, a prosperous merchant from Quebec City. The seignory, called La Grande-Vallée-des-Monts, stretched from Rivière-Magdeleine Seignory in the west to the Saint-Hélier portage in the east. It was inherited by Hazeur's son-in-law, Michel Sarrazin, a surgeon, biologist, and doctor of the King.

No colonization took place until the 1830s, when fishermen of Saint-Thomas-de-Montmagny occupied the place during the summer. In 1842, Alexis Caron and his family, also from Saint-Thomas-de-Montmagny, became the first permanent settlers. In 1846, the mission of Saint-François-Xavier-de-Grande-Vallée was founded. In 1872, the post office opened.

On September 15, 1927, the village was incorporated as a parish municipality, with Arthur S. Fournier as first mayor, although its status as parish municipality was not officially recognized until 1995. In 2005, Grande-Vallée changed its status from parish municipality to just municipality.

== Geography ==
=== Communities ===
The following locations reside within the municipality's boundaries:

- Grande-Vallée-des-Monts (49°10′19″N 65°11′05″W) – a hamlet located along Rivière de la Grande Vallée
- L'Anse-à-Mercier (49°13′36″N 65°06′08″W) – a hamlet located on the Saint Lawrence River

=== Lakes & Rivers ===
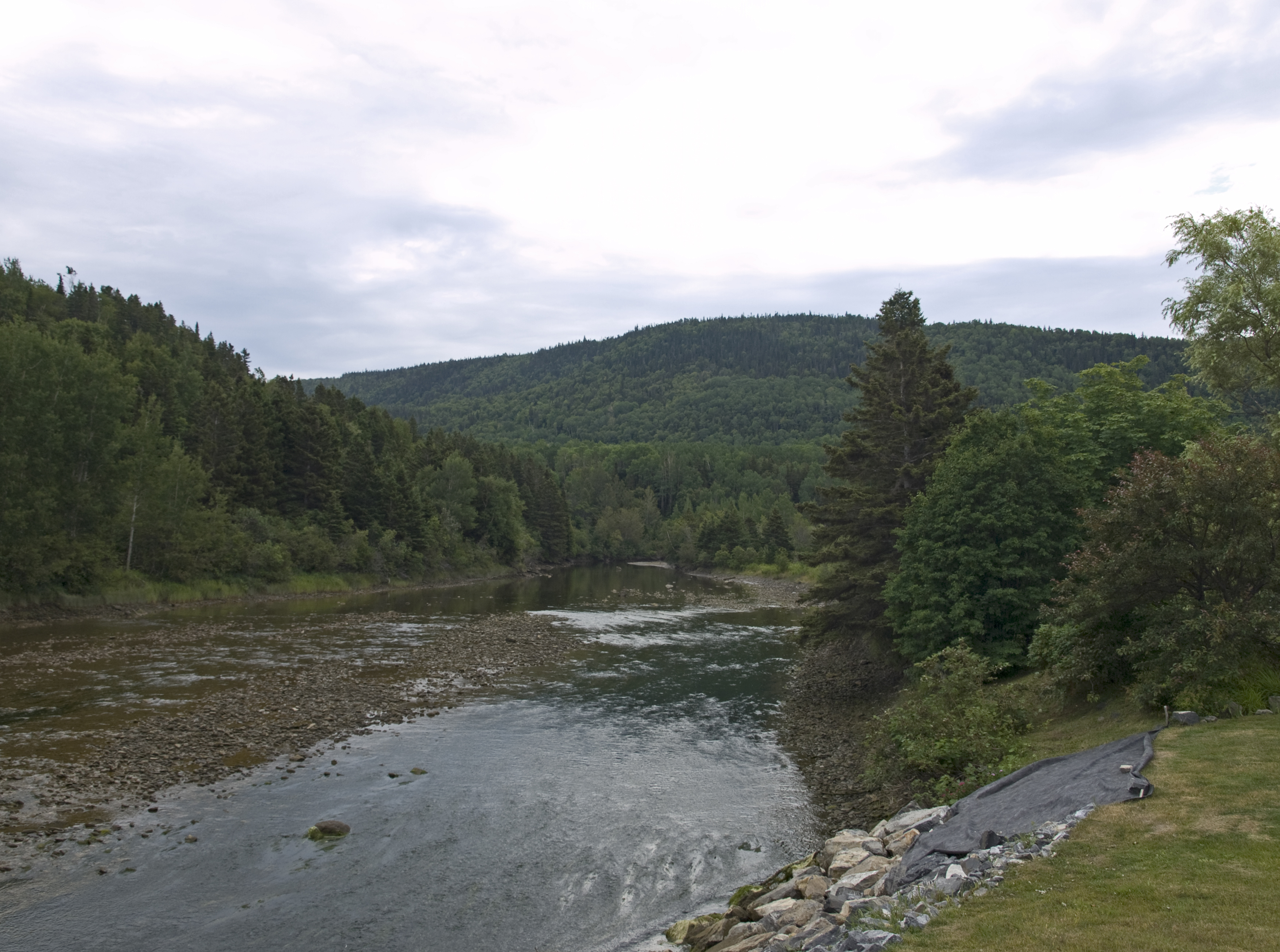
Grande-Vallée River

The following waterways pass through or are situated within the municipality's boundaries:

- Rivière de la Grande Vallée (49°13′31″N 65°07′39″W) – a river that empties into Anse de la Rivière de la Grande Vallée
- Lac de la Confrérie (49°11′06″N 65°06′23″W) – a small lake located 5 kilometres (3.1 mi) southeast of Grande-Vallée village
- Lac du Rocher (49°13′09″N 65°03′47″W) – a lake that lies just south of Route 132

== Demographics ==
=== Population ===
Canada census – Grande-Vallée community profile

	2021	2016	2011
Population	1,077 (+1.9% from 2016)	1,057 (-7.0% from 2011)	1,137 (-7.6% from 2006)
Land area	144.16 km^{2} (55.66 sq mi)	144.50 km^{2} (55.79 sq mi)	144.37 km^{2} (55.74 sq mi)
Population density	7.5/km^{2} (19/sq mi)	7.3/km^{2} (19/sq mi)	7.9/km^{2} (20/sq mi)
Median age	59.2 (M: 59.2, F: 59.2)	56.1 (M: 56.0, F: 56.2)	52.1 (M: 51.4, F: 52.5)
Private dwellings	595 (total) 530 (occupied)	569 (total) 493 (occupied)	572 (total)
Median household income	$60,400	$51,520	$47,360

References: 2021 2016 2011

Historical Census Data - Grande-Vallée, Quebec

Year	Pop.	±%
1931	928	—
1941	827	−10.9%
1951	1,068	+29.1%
1956	1,263	+18.3%
1961	1,490	+18.0%
1966	1,461	−1.9%

Year	Pop.	±%
1971	1,412	−3.4%
1976	1,493	+5.7%
1981	1,612	+8.0%
1986	1,561	−3.2%
1991	1,420	−9.0%
1996	1,431	+0.8%

Year	Pop.	±%
2001	1,309	−8.5%
2006	1,230	−6.0%
2011	1,137	−7.6%
2016	1,057	−7.0%
2021	1,077	+1.9%

Source: Statistics Canada

=== Language ===
Canada Census Mother Tongue - Grande-Vallée, Quebec
Census	Total	French			English			French & English			Other		
Year	Responses	Count	Trend	Pop %	Count	Trend	Pop %	Count	Trend	Pop %	Count	Trend	Pop %
2021	1,075	1,065	▲1.4%	99.1%	5	0.0%	0.5%	0	▼100.0%	0.0%	0	0.0%	0.0%
2016	1,160	1,050	▼6.7%	99.1%	5	▲ n/a%	0.5%	5	▲ n/a%	0.5%	0	▼100.0%	0.0%
2011	1,130	1,125	▼2.0%	99.6%	0	0.0%	0.0%	0	0.0%	0.0%	5	▲ n/a%	0.4%
2006	1,205	1,205	▼6.6%	100.0%	0	0.0%	0.0%	0	0.0%	0.0%	0	0.0%	0.0%
2001	1,290	1,290	▼7.2%	100.0%	0	▼100.0%	0.0%	0	0.0%	0.0%	0	0.0%	0.0%
1996	1,415	1,390	n/a	98.2%	25	n/a	1.8%	0	n/a	0.0%	0	n/a	0.0%

== Government ==
List of former mayors:

- Arthur S. Fournier (1927–1933)
- Wilfrid Fournier (1933–1945)
- Georges Fournier (1945–1951)
- Robert Lebreux (1951–1959, 1960–1969)
- Rodolphe Fournier (1959–1960)
- Rock Fournier (1969–1978)
- Jean Claude Côté (1978–1986)
- Nelson Fournier (1986–1993)
- Sylvain Bouchard (1993–2005)
- Gabriel Minville (2005–2009)
- Nathalie Côté (2009–2017)
- Noël Richard (2017–present)

== See also ==
- List of municipalities in Quebec
