= Media in Quebec City =

This is a list of media in Quebec City, Quebec, Canada.

== Radio ==
FM station

Frequency	Call sign	Branding	Format	Owner	Notes
FM 88.3	CKIA-FM		community	Radio Basse-Ville	French
FM 89.1	CKRL-FM		community	CKRL-MF 89,1	French
FM 90.9	CION-FM	Radio Galilée	Catholic religious programming	Fondation Radio Galilée	French
FM 91.9	CJEC-FM	WKND 91.9	Modern adult contemporary	Leclerc Communication	French
FM 92.7	CJSQ-FM	Hit Country	Country	Arsenal Media	French
FM 93.3	CJMF-FM	FM 93	active rock	Cogeco	French
FM 94.3	CHYZ-FM	94.3 CHYZ	campus radio	Laval University	French
FM 95.3	CBVX-FM	Ici Musique	public music	Canadian Broadcasting Corporation	French
FM 96.1	CBM-FM-2	CBC Music	public music	Canadian Broadcasting Corporation	English
FM 98.1	CHOI-FM	Radio X	talk radio	RNC Media	French
FM 98.9	CHIK-FM	Énergie	mainstream rock	Bell Media Radio	French
FM 100.3	CIHW-FM		community (Huron-Wendat Nation)	Comité de la radio communautaire Huronne	French, Montagnais
FM 100.9	CHXX-FM	BPM Sports 100.9 Québec	sports talk / classic hits	RNC Media	French
FM 102.1	CFEL-FM	blvd 102.1	Alternative rock	Leclerc Communication	French
FM 102.9	CFOM-FM	Rythme FM	classic hits/oldies	Cogeco	French
FM 104.7	CBVE-FM	CBC Radio One	public news/talk	Canadian Broadcasting Corporation	English
FM 106.3	CBV-FM	Ici Radio-Canada Première	public news/talk	Canadian Broadcasting Corporation	French
FM 107.5	CITF-FM	Rouge FM	soft adult contemporary	Bell Media Radio	French

Internet radio stations

Frequency	Branding	Format	Owner	Notes
Internet only	Ici Musique Classique	Classical radio	Société Radio-Canada	Rebroadcasting from Montreal, Serving provincial wide. French
Internet only	Ici Musique Rock	Rock	Société Radio-Canada	Rebroadcasting from Montreal, Serving provincial wide. French
Internet only	Ici Musique Hip-Hop	Urban contemporary	Société Radio-Canada	Rebroadcasting from Montreal, Serving provincial wide. French
Internet only	Ici Musique atmosphère	Ambient music	Société Radio-Canada	Rebroadcasting from Montreal, Serving provincial wide. French
Internet only	Radio Pirate	Talk	Jeff Fillion	French
Internet only	Qub Radio	Talk radio	Quebecor Media	Rebroadcasting from Montreal, Serving provincial wide. French

== Defunct radio stations in Quebec City ==
Over the years a number of radio stations in Quebec City and areas were shut down.

== Television ==
OTA virtual channel (PSIP)	Actual channel	Call sign	Network	Notes
2.1	39 (UHF)	CFAP-DT	Noovo	
4.1	17 (UHF)	CFCM-DT	TVA	
11.1	25 (UHF)	CBVT-DT	Ici Radio-Canada Télé	
15.1	15 (UHF)	CIVQ-DT	Télé-Québec	Rebroadcaster of CIVM-DT (Montreal)
20.1	20 (UHF)	CKMI-DT	Global	Rebroadcaster of CKMI-DT-1 (Montreal); only English-language over-the-air station
–	9 (VHF)	CHMG-TV	Independent	Analogue; branded on air as "Télé-Mag"

CBC Television once operated CBVE-TV, a rebroadcaster of Montreal's CBMT serving Quebec City. In 1997, it took over the old channel 5 position previously occupied by longtime private affiliate CKMI-TV when the latter station switched to Global and moved to channel 20. CBVE-TV would relocate to channel 11 in 2011, after CBVT had shut down its analogue transmitter. However, CBVE-TV was shut down in 2012 along with all CBC-operated rebroadcasters. However, few anglophones lost access to CBC Television programming due to the wide availability of cable and satellite in the city.

Montreal's CFCF-DT (CTV) is piped in via cable. American television stations are piped in from the Burlington, Vermont/Plattsburgh, New York market.

== Internet ==
The primary source of online news in Quebec City is French-language Québec urbain and English-speaking Quebec City101

== Print ==
Quebec City's main newspapers are the tabloids Le Soleil, Le Journal de Québec. It until recently had Voir which has since only distributed in Montreal, Quebec. The Quebec Chronicle-Telegraph, a weekly English community paper, is also published. It claims to be North America's oldest newspaper, in existence since 1764.
