= Media in Abitibi-Témiscamingue =

Almost all media in the Abitibi-Témiscamingue region of Quebec serves all cities in the region, with very little differentiation between the three primary cities of Rouyn-Noranda, Val-d'Or, and Amos.

Although the cities of Rouyn-Noranda and Val-d'Or are far enough apart that radio and television stations in the area serve the cities from separate transmitters, almost every broadcast station in either city has a rebroadcaster in the other city. The only nominal exceptions are the cities' separate Énergie stations, although at present even these stations share the majority of their broadcast schedule. While Amos is the official city of license for some of the rebroadcasters, only one radio station originates in that city, and all transmitters licensed to either Amos or Val-d'Or encompass both cities within their broadcast range.

== History ==
In 1920 the first newspaper in the region L'Abitibi appeared and its director was Hector Authier. In 1922, it became La Gazette du Nord and subsequently L'Écho Abitibien in 1952.

In 1938 Donald A. Jones, the owner of the Rouyn-Noranda Press, obtained a broadcasting license. The following year the station CKRN was in operation, affiliated with CBL-Toronto. RNC Média was founded in 1948 by Jean-Joffre and David-Armand Gourd and brings together the stations CKRN 1400 AM (Rouyn-Noranda), CKVD 900 AM (Val-d'Or), CHAD 1340 AM (Amos) and CKLS 1240 AM (La Sarre).

In 1957 CKRN-TV became the first television station in Abitibi-Témiscamingue, affiliated with Radio-Canada television. Until 2018, the region was served by ICI Radio-Canada Télé (CKRN-DT) which broadcast on channel 4 in Rouyn-Noranda, affiliated with RNC Média with antennas throughout the region.

In 1957 two cable distributors were founded: Câblevision in the regions of Rouyn-Noranda, Val-d'Or and Malartic, and Câble Amos in the greater Amos region. Cablevision was purchased in 2001 by Télébec, owned by BCE, and became a subsidiary of Bell Aliant. Its community television is branded TVC9. In 2019, Cable Amos was purchased by Vidéotron. Its community television is branded MédiAT-TVC7.

In the 1960s community media offered the population programming focused on popular education with the Multi-media organization which bought airtime on radio and television. It also worked in newspapers. Fernand Bellehumeur was its first anchor. François Gendron, at the time a teacher, was an educational facilitator.

In the fall of 1979 CFEM-TV (TVA, formerly Télé-Métropole) went on the air. CIVA-TV (Télé-Québec, formerly Radio-Québec) went on the air and CFVS-TV (now Noovo, formerly Télévision Quatre Saisons) appeared in 1986.

== Radio ==
FM stations

Frequency	Callsign	Branding	Format	Owner	Notes
FM 88.3	CBFX-FM-3	Ici Musique	public music	Canadian Broadcasting Corporation	Amos; satellite of CBFX-FM Montreal
FM 88.7	CHIC-FM		Christian	Communications CHIC	Rouyn-Noranda
FM 89.1	CBFY-FM	Ici Radio-Canada Première	news/talk	Canadian Broadcasting Corporation	Ville-Marie; satellite of CHLM
FM 89.9	CBFX-FM-4	Ici Musique	public music	Canadian Broadcasting Corporation	Rouyn-Noranda; satellite of CBFX-FM Montreal
FM 90.7	CHLM-FM	Ici Radio-Canada Première	news/talk	Canadian Broadcasting Corporation	Rouyn-Noranda
FM 91.5	CHLM-FM-1	Ici Radio-Canada Première	news/talk	Canadian Broadcasting Corporation	Amos; satellite of CHLM
FM 91.9	CBMA-FM	CBC Radio One	news/talk	Canadian Broadcasting Corporation	Rouyn-Noranda; satellite of CBVE-FM Quebec City
FM 92.1	CKVM-FM-1	Radio CKVM	full service	Radio-Témiscamingue	Témiscaming; satellite of CKVM
FM 92.3	CHNT-FM		First Nations community radio	Minwadjimowin Algonquin Communication Society	Timiskaming First Nation
FM 92.5	CJMM-FM-1	Énergie	contemporary hit radio	Bell Media Radio	La Sarre; satellite of CJMM
FM 92.5	CHUT-FM-1		First Nations community radio	Radio communautaire Lac-Simon	Val-d'Or; satellite of CHUT
FM 93.1	CKVM-FM	Radio CKVM	full service	Radio-Témiscamingue	Ville-Marie
FM 95.3	CHUT-FM		First Nations community radio	Radio communautaire Lac-Simon	Lac-Simon
FM 95.7	CHGO-FM-1	O 104,3-102,1-95,7	Classic rock	Arsenal Media	Rouyn-Noranda; satellite of CHGO
FM 95.9	CBF-FM-1	Ici Radio-Canada Première	news/talk	Canadian Broadcasting Corporation	Senneterre; satellite of CHLM
FM 96.5	CHOA-FM	WOW FM	adult contemporary	Arsenal Media	Rouyn-Noranda
FM 98.3	CHUN-FM		First Nations community radio	Radio communautaire Lac-Simon	Rouyn-Noranda; satellite of CHUT
FM 99.1	CJMM-FM	Énergie	contemporary hit radio	Bell Media Radio	Rouyn-Noranda
FM 100.5	CIBO-FM		community radio	Radio Communautaire MF de Senneterre	Senneterre
FM 100.7	CHLM-FM-2	Ici Radio-Canada Première	news/talk	Canadian Broadcasting Corporation	La Sarre; satellite of CHLM
FM 101.1	CBMN-FM	CBC Radio One	news/talk	Canadian Broadcasting Corporation	Malartic/Val-d'Or; satellite of CBVE-FM Quebec City
FM 102.1	CJGO-FM	O 104,3-102,1-95,7	Classic rock	Arsenal Media	La Sarre
FM 102.7	CJMV-FM	Énergie	contemporary hit radio	Bell Media Radio	Val-d'Or
FM 103.1	CBFZ-FM	Ici Radio-Canada Première	news/talk	Canadian Broadcasting Corporation	Témiscaming; satellite of CHLM
FM 103.5	CHOA-FM-1	WOW FM	adult contemporary	Arsenal Media	Amos; satellite of CHOA
FM 103.9	CHOA-FM-2	WOW FM	adult contemporary	Arsenal Media	La Sarre; satellite of CHOA
FM 104.3	CHGO-FM	O 104,3-102,1-95,7	Classic rock	Arsenal Media	Amos
FM 105.3	CHOW-FM	Radio Boréale	community radio	Radio Boréale	Amos

Internet radio stations

Frequency	Branding	Format	Owner	Notes
Internet only	Ici Musique Classique	Classical radio	Société Radio-Canada	Rebroadcasting from Montreal, Serving provincial wide. French
Internet only	Ici Musique Rock	Rock	Société Radio-Canada	Rebroadcasting from Montreal, Serving provincial wide. French
Internet only	Ici Musique Hip-Hop	Urban contemporary	Société Radio-Canada	Rebroadcasting from Montreal, Serving provincial wide. French
Internet only	Ici Musique atmosphère	Ambient music	Société Radio-Canada	Rebroadcasting from Montreal, Serving provincial wide. French
Internet only	Qub Radio	Talk radio	Quebecor Media	Rebroadcasting from Montreal, Serving provincial wide. French

- FM 100.5 CFME, a French language events radio station in Rouyn-Noranda.

== Television ==
Analogue channel	Digital channel	Digital PSIP	Call sign	Network	Notes
	8	8.1	CIVA-DT-1	Télé-Québec	Rouyn-Noranda; satellite of CIVM-TV Montreal
	10	10.1	CFEM-DT-1	TVA	Val-d'Or; satellite of CFEM-DT
11			CITO-TV-2	CTV	Kearns, Ontario; satellite of CITO-TV, Timmins, ON
	12	12.1	CIVA-DT	Télé-Québec	Val-d'Or; satellite of CIVM-DT Montreal
	13	13.1	CFEM-DT	TVA	Rouyn-Noranda
	20	20.1	CFVS-DT-1	Noovo	Rouyn-Noranda; satellite of CFVS-DT
	15	25.1	CFVS-DT	Noovo	Val-d'Or

== Newspapers ==
- Le Citoyen (in French)
- Le Reflet (in French)
- L'Indice bohémien (in French)
- L'Écho des montagnes (in French)
- La Depêche (in French)

Old Newspapers

- L'Écho (in French)
- L'Éclat (in French)
- La Frontière (in French)
- Rouyn-Noranda Press (in English)
