= Radio X =

Radio X may refer to:

- Radio X (United Kingdom), formerly known as XFM
- These stations owned by RNC Media in Quebec:
  - CHOI-FM 98.1, Quebec City
  - CKYK-FM 95.7, Saguenay
  - CKLX-FM 91.9, Montreal
- WKPX 88.5 FM, Sunrise, Florida
- Radio X, a radio station heard in the video game Grand Theft Auto: San Andreas soundtrack

== Former stations ==
- These stations owned by RNC Media:
  - CFTX-FM 96.5, Gatineau (formerly known as Tag Radio X)
  - CHGO-FM 104.3, Val-d'Or (formerly known as GO Radio X)
  - CJGO-FM 102.1, La Sarre (formerly known as GO Radio X)
- DYRX 102.3 FM, Oton, Iloilo, Philippines
