= CBC Quebec =

CBC Quebec refers to:

- CBVE-FM, CBC Radio One on 104.7 FM
- CBVE-TV, CBC Television on channel 5, former rebroadcaster of CBMT

SRC Quebec refers to:

- CBV-FM, Première Chaîne on 106.3 FM
- CBVX-FM, Espace musique on 95.3 FM
- CBVT, Télévision de Radio-Canada on channel 11
