= Rythme FM =

Adult contemporary FM radio network in Quebec, Canada

- Type: Adult contemporary radio network
- Country: Canada

Ownership
- Owner: Cogeco

History
- Launch date: 1999

Coverage
- Availability: FM: Quebec (Montreal, Quebec City, Saguenay, Sherbrooke, Trois-Rivières, Gatineau)

Links
- Website: Rythme FM

Rythme FM is a network of French-language adult contemporary FM radio stations broadcasting in most major markets of Quebec. The network was created and owned by Cogeco.

== History ==
Previous Rythme FM logo, used from 2006 (ca.) to August 2009. The tri-oval shape, a part of Rythme FM's logo since its 1999 introduction, was used until 2018.

The brand "Rythme FM" was introduced in January 1999 at CFGL-FM in the Montreal market, and the network was created after Cogeco received new licences in other markets in 2002 and 2003.

The Rythme FM network is in direct competition against Rouge FM; both networks offer a very similar product, with Rouge FM having a marginally hot AC-leaning sound compared to Rythme FM, which leans somewhat more towards oldies/classic hits.

On April 30, 2010, Cogeco announced it would purchase Corus Quebec's radio stations. The sale was approved by the CRTC on December 17, 2010; one of the conditions, however, stipulated that Rythme FM outlet CJEC-FM in Quebec City must be sold to another party by December 2011. On November 9, 2011, it was announced that Cogeco would sell CJEC-FM, as well as CFEL-FM, to Leclerc Communication Inc., a company owned by Quebec City businessman Jacques Leclerc, owner of Laura Secord Chocolates and Biscuits Leclerc.

Following Leclerc's takeover of CJEC-FM, that station continued to carry Rythme FM's branding and networked programming until May 21, 2012, when it dropped its branding and programming in favour of its own programming, relaunched on June 20, 2012 as WKND 91.9. As Cogeco opted to leave its other stations in Quebec City, CFOM-FM and CJMF-FM, as they are for the short term, it leaves the Quebec City area without a Rythme FM affiliate.

On August 16, 2011, CIME-FM in Saint-Jérôme became part of Rythme FM network and added programming from Rythme FM and also adopted imaging and slogan of Rythme FM, but kept its CIME branding.

On August 25, 2014, following an agreement with RNC Media, CHLX-FM Gatineau became an affiliate of Rythme FM, adopting its branding, becoming the first non-Cogeco station to affiliate with that network (other than CJEC-FM). This will follow on March 9, 2015 with the rebranding of RNC-owned CHOA-FM in Rouyn-Noranda, expanding the Rythme FM network to the Abitibi-Témiscamingue region; ironically, CHOA-FM was once an affiliate of Rythme FM's competitor, RockDétente (now Rouge FM), before rebranding to Couleur FM in the mid-2000s.

On November 26, 2014, it was announced that Attraction Radio stations CKRS-FM (later reassigned CILM-FM) 98.3 and CKGS-FM 105.5 in Saguenay will join the Rythme FM network beginning February 9, 2015; this followed the CRTC's approval to increase the amount of music hours for CKRS. This would bring the Rythme FM affiliate and branding to every major market in Quebec, except Quebec City.

On August 22, 2016, CIME-FM, which adopted Rythme FM's logo styling (but not its name) and some of its programming, left the Rythme network and adopted a new slogan: "La Couleur Musicale des Laurentides". The CIME branding would expand to CJLA-FM Lachute, Quebec and CHPR-FM Hawkesbury, Ontario following Cogeco's acquisition of these stations from RNC Media in 2018.

In January 2017, CHLX-FM dropped Rythme FM and re-branded as Wow 97.1, which they continue to use to this day. On August 7. 2017, its sister station, CHOA-FM, dropped Rythme FM and re-branded similarly as Wow FM. In April 2018, Cogeco acquired CHOA-FM, but kept the Wow FM branding. On March 24, 2022, Arsenal Media (formerly Attraction Radio) acquired CHOA-FM, still branded as WOW FM.

In August 2018, Attraction Radio abandoned the Rythme FM network affiliation on CILM-FM and CKGS-FM for its in-house branding, "O". Cogeco would acquire CILM-FM from Arsenal Media on April 25, 2022, reintroducing the Rythme FM branding in Saguenay in the process.

On August 16, 2021, the Rythme FM branding was reintroduced to Quebec City when Cogeco-owned CFOM-FM changed its branding from M 102.9. This led the return of the Rythme FM branding and format to the Quebec City market since CJEC-FM's disaffiliation and sale in 2012.

In January 17, 2025, CHLX-FM returned into the Rythme FM affiliation

== Rythme FM stations ==
=== Cogeco-owned ===
- Laval / Montreal - CFGL-FM 105.7 MHz
- Quebec City - CFOM-FM 102.1 MHz
- Saguenay (Chicoutimi) - CILM-FM 98.3 MHz
- Sherbrooke - CFGE-FM 93.7 MHz
- Trois-Rivières - CJEB-FM 100.1 MHz

=== Affiliated stations ===
- Gatineau / Ottawa - CHLX-FM 97.1 MHz (owned by RNC Media)

=== Former affiliated stations ===
- Saguenay (La Baie) - CKGS-FM 105.5 MHz (owned by Arsenal Media)
- Rouyn-Noranda - CHOA-FM 96.5 MHz (owned by Arsenal Media); repeaters in Val-d'Or (103.5 MHz) and La Sarre (103.9 MHz)
- Saint-Jérôme - CIME-FM (as "CIME") 103.9 MHz

=== Former stations ===
- Quebec City - CJEC-FM (now owned by Leclerc Communication; rebranded as "WKND 91.9")

== Programming ==
=== Bonjour ===
Bonjour [region] is Rythme FM's breakfast program, broadcast weekdays between 5:30 am and 8:30 am. Each station has its own set of hosts and news reporters. The show mixes music with reports on the latest news and the world of showbiz. Formerly, the show had the name of Rythmez vos matins. At first, the show was called Les Matins de [region].

==== Montreal ====
- Philippe Pépin, Marie-Ève Janvier and Stéphane Bellavance (hosts)
- Valérie Leboeuf (newsreader)
- Jessika Brazeau (showbiz newsreader)
- Michel Harvey (traffic reporter)

==== Hosts in other regions ====
- Karl Blanchard, Christine Plamondon and Marc-Antoine Munez (Mauricie)
- Sébastien Bouchard and Isabelle Peron (Estrie)
- Mathieu Beauregard, Marie-Christine Bernard and Jean-François Desbiens (Saugenay)

=== Rythme au travail ===
Rythme au travail is Rythme FM's weekday commercial-free music block, heard 8:30 am–11:30 am and 1 pm-4 pm, except Friday afternoons in Mauricie, where it airs 1 pm-3 pm.

==== Hosts ====
- Julie Bélanger (Montréal)
- Claudia Ébacher (Mauricie)
- Isabelle David (Estrie)
- Valérie Saulnier (Saguenay)

=== Mitsou et Jean-Philippe ===
Mitsou et Jean-Philippe is Rythme FM's lunchtime program hosted by Mitsou Gélinas et Jean-Philippe Dion, airing 11:30 a.m. to 1 p.m. on all stations.

=== Des hits dans l'trafic ===
Des hits dans l'trafic is the afternoon drive program, hosted by Marie-Soleil Michon et Sébastien Benoît and airing across the network Monday-Thursday afternoons from 4 pm to 6 pm. Last year, it replaced Le Show Du Retour with Marie-Soleil Michon and Patrick Marsolais; that show's predecessor was Véro Show, hosted by Véronique Cloutier.

==== Contributors ====
- Ricardo (Monday - cooking)
- Sylvie Lavallée (Tuesday - sexuality)
- Jean-Philippe Dion (Wednesday - showbiz)
- Guylaine Tremblay (Thursday - milestones)
- Véronique Cloutier (daily - personal chronicles)

=== La Playlist ===
La Playlist is a weekday countdown of Rythme FM's top three most-requested songs of that day amongst the station's other hits, heard weekdays 6 pm and 8 pm and hosted by Denis Fortin.

=== Soirée à votre rythme ===
Soirée à votre rythme is the evening/early late night program, heard everyday 8 pm and midnight. This program is hosted by Stéphane Richard \Monday to Thursday, and Marie-Andrée Hamel Friday through Sunday. Unlike Rythme FM's other programs, which utilize a playlist of French and English hits, Soirée à votre rythme broadcasts only Francophone hits.

=== Les nuits 100% musique ===
Les nuits 100% musique is Rythme FM's overnight program, broadcasting from 12 midnight to 5:30 a.m. weekdays or 6 a.m. weekends. An automated hostless program, the program features mainly English pop-dance music, with songs from other pop genres and francophone tunes included.

=== Les weekends à... ===
Les weekends à [host's name] is heard Fridays at 4 pm (3 pm in Mauricie) to 8 pm and the weekends from 11 am to 4 pm; a mix of pop, dance and rock music, with information on the weekend's events in the region it serves.

==== Hosts ====
- Mario Lirette (Montréal)
- Alexandre Trudel (Mauricie)
- Michel Lafrance (Estrie)
- Samuel Gagné Rosière (Saguenay)

=== Showbiz Weekend ===
Showbiz Weekend is the weekend breakfast program, heard across the network 6 am-9 am. Julie Desjardins (or her substitute hosts, Émilie Brassard or Julie St-Pierre) focuses on the weekend's events in each Rythme FM-served region, as well as the latest celebrity and showbiz news. The show's music mix is primarily Francophone, with some English songs included.

=== 25 ans de hits ===
25 ans de hits features the top Francophone and Anglophone hits of the 1980s, 1990s and 2000s, heard Saturday morning 9 am-11 am on the network. François Fortin is the show's host. The show was previously named Souriez, c'est Samedi!, hosted by Philippe Pépin.

=== Le party dance ===
Le party dance is Rythme FM's Saturday night dance music program, airing 4 pm-8 pm. The majority of the program's music mix is dance and disco music from the 1980s and 1990s, along with celebrity news fashion tips and some competitions, plus special requests from listeners. François Fortin hosts.

=== Dimanche 90 ===
Dimanche 90 is the Sunday morning classic hits show, with music ranged from the 1960s to the 2000s, hosted by Nadia Bilodeau. It currently airs 9 am-11 am. It was originally named Le Palmarès with Sébastien Benoît, featuring the week's most requested songs. The year before, this slot was occupied by Le Dimanche, C'est Le Bonheur with Francisco Randez.

=== Les hits 90 - 2000 ===
Les hits 90 - 2000 is the Sunday night greatest hits show, airing 4 pm-8 pm and hosted by Francois Fortin. Before, it was called Weekend 80-90 and hosted by Philippe Pépin.
