= CHPR =

CHPR may stand for:

- Cromford and High Peak Railway, a railway line in the United Kingdom,
- CHPR-FM, a radio station in Hawkesbury, Ontario, Canada.
- Center for Healthcare Policy and Research University of California, Davis, Research Center located in Sacramento, CA
- Complementary Health Practice Review
