= Go FM =

Go FM may refer to:

- the former name of Radio One FM 94.3, a radio station in India.
- the current on-air brand name of CHGO-FM and CJGO-FM in the Canadian province of Quebec.
- the brand name of CILK-FM, CHRX-FM, and CJMG-FM in British Columbia, Canada.
