= CKRN-DT =

Television station in Rouyn-Noranda (1957–2018)

- Rouyn-Noranda, Quebec; Canada
- Channels: Digital: 9 (VHF); Virtual: 4
- Branding: Radio-Canada Télévision CKRN

Programming
- Affiliations: Ici Radio-Canada Télé (1957–2018); CBC Television (secondary; 1957–1962)

Ownership
- Owner: RNC Media
- Sister stations: CFEM-DT, CFVS-DT

History
- First air date: December 25, 1957
- Last air date: March 25, 2018; (60 years, 90 days)
- Former call signs: CKRN-TV (1957–2011)
- Former channel numbers: Analog: 4 (VHF, 1957–2011)
- Call sign meaning: Radio-Nord (original name of last owner) or CK Rouyn-Noranda

Technical information
- Licensing authority: CRTC
- ERP: 19 kW
- HAAT: 219.6 m (720 ft)
- Transmitter coordinates: 48°15′52″N 79°2′38″W
- Translator(s): see § Transmitters

CKRN-DT (channel 4), branded Radio-Canada Télévision CKRN, was a television station licensed to Rouyn-Noranda, Quebec, Canada, affiliated with Ici Radio-Canada Télé. Privately owned by RNC Media, it essentially functioned as a semi-satellite of Montreal Radio-Canada flagship station CBFT-DT due to not having alternative non-network sources of programming available.

CKRN-DT was sister to TVA outlet CFEM-DT and Val-d'Or V (now Noovo) outlet CFVS-DT, and the three stations shared studios on Avenue Murdoch and Avenue de la Saint Anne in Rouyn-Noranda. CKRN-DT's transmitter was located near Chemin Powell (north of Route 101).

== History ==
The station commenced broadcasting on December 25, 1957 as then-Radio-Nord's first television station, sharing its callsign with its radio sister station, CKRN AM 1400 (now CHOA-FM 96.5). It was originally an affiliate of Radio-Canada and the English language CBC. The CBC subsequently launched a rebroadcaster in Malartic of its English Montreal affiliate CBMT in the area in 1961, CBVD-TV channel 5, and CKRN dropped its English programming in 1962. (Note: CBVD primarily served the Val-d'Or area, with a marginal signal at best in Rouyn-Noranda; CBC for the Rouyn-Noranda area was served by CFCL-TV-2 channel 2 in Kearns, Ontario, a repeater of CFCL-TV in Timmins; that translator would become CBLT-8 in 2008, as a repeater of CBLT in Toronto. Both CBVD and CBLT-8 would close in 2012, due to the CBC's budget cuts.)

On March 1, 2018, it was announced that CKRN would cease broadcasting at midnight on March 25. RNC announced it wanted to concentrate its efforts on CFEM and CFVS. The shutdown of CKRN left Ici Radio-Canada Télé without an over-the-air outlet in the Abitibi-Témiscamingue region.

== Transmitters ==
Station	City of licence	Channel	ERP	HAAT	Transmitter coordinates
CKRN-TV-2	Ville-Marie	6 (VHF)	0.005 kW	NA	47°21′12″N 79°27′36″W
CKRN-TV-3	Béarn/Fabre	3 (VHF) (had construction permit to move to 7 (VHF))	3.64 kW	165.5 m (543 ft)	47°15′16″N 79°22′37″W
CJDG-DT	Val-d'Or	7 (VHF)	21.5 kW	204.5 m (671 ft)	48°25′17″N 77°50′49″W
CJDG-TV-2	Lebel-sur-Quévillon	11 (VHF)	0.005 kW	NA	49°3′25″N 76°58′47″W
CJDG-TV-3	Joutel	11 (VHF)	0.781 kW	152.7 m (501 ft)	49°27′20″N 78°19′51″W
CJDG-TV-4	Matagami	9 (VHF)	0.364 kW	78.9 m (259 ft)	49°44′3″N 77°40′44″W
