= CFOM-FM =

Radio station in Lévis, Quebec

- Lévis, Quebec; Canada
- Broadcast area: Capitale-Nationale
- Frequency: 102.9 MHz
- Branding: 102.9 Rythme FM

Programming
- Language: French
- Format: Adult contemporary
- Affiliations: Rythme FM

Ownership
- Owner: Cogeco; (591991 B.C. Ltd.)
- Sister stations: CJMF-FM

History
- First air date: December 1967
- Former call signs: CFLS (1967–1994); CFLS-FM (1994–1995)
- Former frequencies: 1240 kHz (1967–1976); 920 kHz (1976–1994)

Technical information
- Licensing authority: CRTC
- Class: C1
- ERP: 14,374 watts; 32,800 watts (peak)
- HAAT: 461.7 metres (1,515 ft)
- Transmitter coordinates: 46°49′17″N 71°29′46″W

Links
- Website: quebec.rythmefm.com

CFOM-FM is a French-language Canadian radio station located in Quebec City, Quebec, licensed to Lévis. The station has an adult contemporary format since August 2014.

Owned and operated by Cogeco, it broadcasts on 102.9 MHz using a directional antenna with an average effective radiated power of 16,800 watts and a peak effective radiated power of 32,800 watts (class C1). The station's transmitter is located at Mount Bélair.

== History ==
It used to be an AM station, broadcast at 1240 AM from its inception in December 1967 until 1976, then moved to 920 AM until 1994 and was originally known as CFLS. In 1988, CFLS's then-owner, Radio Etchemin, planned to relocate CFLS from 920 kHz to the FM band at 106.3 MHz, with effective radiated power of 54,350 watts; this application was denied by the CRTC. (106.3 has since been occupied by the local Ici Radio-Canada Première outlet, CBV-FM.) CFLS's second application to relocate to FM, this time to 102.9 MHz, was successful, and the relocation was made in 1994. When the station switched to an oldies format in 1995, it changed its call sign to the current CFOM-FM.

Ironically, CFLS was Quebec City's Top 40 station in the 1970s and early 1980s and had to compete, until 1976, against an English-language Top 40 station known as CFOM, which was closed by order of the CRTC for failure to respect CBC Radio affiliation requirements. That station began operating in 1949 under the callsign CJNT until 1954 when the call letters were changed to CJQC and were again changed in 1964 to become CFOM/1340.

CFOM-FM's logo as a "Souvenirs Garantis" station, 2005–2012.

In March 2009, then-owner Corus Entertainment expanded CFOM-FM's Souvenirs Garantis format (which was introduced on CFOM in 2005) to CHLT-FM in Sherbrooke, CJRC-FM in Gatineau, CHLN-FM in Trois-Rivières and CKRS-FM in Saguenay—replacing their long-time news-talk formats on these stations.

On April 30, 2010, it was announced that Cogeco will acquire all radio stations owned by Corus in Quebec for $80 million, pending CRTC approval. However, Cogeco must either apply with the CRTC for an exemption from the common ownership policy, or sell off some of these (or Cogeco's own stations) to a third party as they will be over the maximum allowable number of stations in Montreal, Quebec City, and Sherbrooke. Corus is selling off their Quebec radio stations, as they are less profitable than Corus's stations in other parts of Canada. The sale of CFOM-FM and most other Corus Québec stations has been approved by the CRTC on December 17, 2010, on the condition that Cogeco-owned CJEC-FM and Corus-owned CFEL-FM be sold to another party by December 2011; these stations were sold to Leclerc Communication Inc. in November 2011.

By 2011, the station changed to a more classic hits-leaning adult contemporary format, even though the classic hits currents remain on the station.

By December 6, 2011, CFOM was the remaining station in the Souvenirs Garantis group, following the closure of its sister station, CJTS-FM in Sherbrooke.

On Sunday September 16, 2012, CFOM discarded its longtime Souvenirs Garantis branding, becoming 102,9 Québec, retaining its classic hits format. The station rebranded again in August 2014, becoming M FM, switching to Hot AC. With the re-branding, the station dropped all pre-1980 music and promised that it would focus on reducing the amount of unnecessary non-music content (such as jocks and contests) heard, in favor of increased music.

On June 1, 2021, Cogeco Media announces that "M 102.9" will become a station of the Rythme FM network, effective August 16, 2021. This led the return of the Rythme FM branding and format to the Quebec City market since CJEC-FM's disaffiliation and sale in 2012.
