= CJPX-FM =

Radio station in Montreal

Coordinates: 45°30′20.16″N 73°35′30.12″W

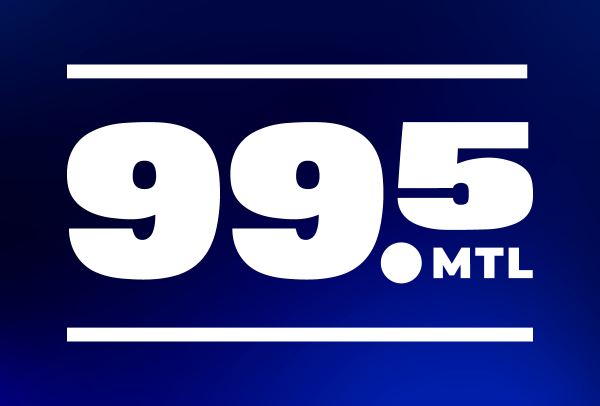
- Montreal, Quebec; Canada
- Broadcast area: Greater Montreal
- Frequency: 99.5 MHz (HD Radio)
- Branding: 99,5 Montréal

Programming
- Format: News/talk, rock music
- Subchannels: HD2: CJEC-FM simulcast

Ownership
- Owner: Leclerc Communication

History
- First air date: June 25, 1998

Technical information
- Class: B
- ERP: 8,700 watts
- HAAT: 296.3 metres (972 ft)

Links
- Website: 995.fm

CJPX-FM (99.5 MHz) is a French-language Canadian radio station located in Montreal, Quebec. Owned and operated by Leclerc Communication, it broadcasts using an omnidirectional antenna on Mount Royal with an effective radiated power of 8,700 watts (class B).

The station launched in 1998 as a commercial classical music station, branded Radio-Classique, and continued in that format until a sale in 2020 when it shifted to an adult contemporary format. In August 2024, CJPX shifted to talk programming, simulcasting Quebecor's Qub Radio, during daytime hours on weekdays, with rock music in other time periods.

== History ==
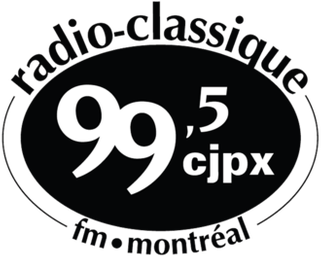
Logo from 1998 to 2015.

The station had a classical music commercial format at its inception on June 25, 1998. The station was the first successful commercial classical music station in Montreal, following the failure of CJRM-FM in 1968 and decades of reluctance since then by the CRTC to allow such a station to go on the air. It was conceived in the 'Top 40 classics' style of Radio Classique in France, or Classic FM in the UK.

In December 2014, it was announced that CJPX and its Quebec City sister station CJSQ-FM would be sold to Groupe Musique Greg, a company founded by Montreal musician and radio personality Gregory Charles. Charles' offer to buy the two stations came in response to rumours that former owner Jean-Pierre Coallier was looking to retire and sell them.

The station was the only 24-hour source of mostly classical music in Montreal – including some jazz, with the two national CBC FM networks, Ici Musique and CBC Music, switching around 2009 to a mix of classical, jazz, adult alternative and other genres. CJPX-FM did mix in some occasional jazz, film music and chansons, in a limited amount.

Logo from 2015 to June 13, 2020.

In 2015, retired former Le Téléjournal news anchor Bernard Derome joined the station as a morning host. Other personalities include Charles, Marie-Ève Lamonde, François Paré and Marc Hervieux, plus Béatrice Zacharie and Jasmin Hains, both broadcasting from CJSQ-FM in Quebec City.

As Radio-Classique, its main studios were located in Parc Jean-Drapeau on Île Notre-Dame in the middle of the Saint Lawrence River.

Logo from June 17, 2020 to August 26, 2024.

On April 3, 2020, the CRTC approved the sale of CJPX-FM to Leclerc Communication for $4.89 million. Leclerc Communication had previously tried to acquire CKLX-FM and CHOI-FM from RNC Media, but called off the sale when the CRTC required it to divest a station. The new owner replaced the classical music programming with an adult contemporary one, branded as WKND 99.5, in a similar format to Quebec City's sister station CJEC-FM. Radio-Classique went off air on June 13, 2020.

Following several years of low ratings under the new format, on August 12, 2024, Leclerc and Quebecor announced they had reached a content distribution agreement whereby CJPX would simulcast the talk programming of the latter’s Qub Radio service from 6:00 a.m. to 6:00 p.m. on weekdays, starting Monday, August 26, entering direct competition during those hours with longstanding market leader CHMP-FM (98.5 FM). As a result, the station will drop the WKND branding and format, and rebrand as simply 99.5 Montreal. To comply with CRTC regulations on programming for standard FM radio licences, the station will carry a rock music format at all other hours (CHMP was similarly required to carry 50% music programming until 2007). Quebecor cannot acquire the station outright under CRTC cross-media ownership regulations, as it already owns a daily newspaper, Le Journal de Montréal, and a broadcast TV station, CFTM-DT, in the Montreal media market.

In May 2026, CJPX acquired the French radio rights to the Montreal Alouettes.
