= CFML (disambiguation) =

CFML is an abbreviation for ColdFusion Markup Language, a scripting language

CFML may also refer to:

- CFIX (AM), previously CFML, a former Canadian radio station in Cornwall, Ontario
- CFML-FM, a campus radio station in Burnaby, British Columbia
