= CFIX =

CFIX may refer to:

- CFIX-FM, a radio station (96.9 FM) licensed in Saguenay, Quebec, Canada
- CFIX (AM), a former radio station (1170 AM) licensed in Cornwall, Ontario, Canada
- Cefixime, by the trade name CFIX
