= CBVP =

CBVP may refer to:

- CBVP-FM, a radio retransmitter (105.3 FM) licensed to Perce, Quebec, Canada, retransmitting CBVE-FM
- CBVP-TV, a television rebroadcaster (channel 14) licensed to Perce, Quebec, Canada, rebroadcasting CBMT
