= CIME-FM =

Radio station in Saint-Jérôme

Coordinates: 45°51′50″N 74°01′17″W

- Saint-Jérôme, Quebec; Canada
- Broadcast area: Laurentides; Montreal (northern suburbs & city's north end)
- Frequency: 103.9 MHz
- Branding: CIME 103,9 et 101,3

Programming
- Language: French
- Format: Hot adult contemporary
- Affiliations: Rythme FM (2012–2016)

Ownership
- Owner: Cogeco; (Diffusion Métromédia CMR Inc.)

History
- First air date: March 25, 1977
- Call sign meaning: "cime", French word for mountain peak

Technical information
- Licensing authority: CRTC
- Class: C1
- ERP: 11,700 watts (average); 39,300 watts (peak)
- HAAT: 180.2 metres (591 ft)
- Repeaters: 102.9 CIME-FM-1 (Val-Morin); 101.3 CIME-FM-2 (Mont-Tremblant)

Links
- Webcast: Listen live
- Website: laurentides.cime.fm

CIME-FM (103.9 FM) is a French-language radio station located in Saint-Jérôme, Quebec, Canada, about 40 kilometres (25 mi) north of Montreal.

Owned and operated by Cogeco, it broadcasts using a directional antenna with an average effective radiated power of 11,700 watts and a peak effective radiated power of 39,300 watts (class C1).

The station has an adult top 40 format under the CIME branding.

The station also operates two rebroadcasters : a low-power one (CIME-FM-1) in Val-Morin, on 102.9 using a directional antenna with an average effective radiated power of 4 watts and a peak effective radiated power of 14 watts (class LP), and a stronger one (CIME-FM-2) in Mont-Tremblant, on 101.3 with an effective radiated power of 800 watts (class B) using an omnidirectional antenna.

longtime Corus-era CIME logo; used until August 2011

CIME-FM opened on March 25, 1977, and originally had a middle of the road format, which gradually evolved over time to a more traditional hot adult contemporary format and currently it is an adult contemporary station.

CIME-FM was originally located in Sainte-Adèle, about 70 kilometres north of Montreal, and had a 50,000 watts omnidirectional signal on 99.5 MHz. The station moved to Saint-Jérôme in mid-1998, at the same time that it moved to 103.9 and inaugurated its 101.3 relay (the smaller 102.9 one was operational since the beginning). These changes in frequencies were a result of a deal to allow the 99.5 to be used in Montreal for the new CJPX-FM. As a result, CIME-FM can only be heard now in parts of Montreal itself, but has a better coverage in their targeted area (the Laurentides region).

The station is especially famous or infamous (depending on the point of view) for its now-discontinued practices of airing subliminal messages intended to induce relaxation at night and using a system of audio tones as a mosquito repellent.

On December 17, 2010, the CRTC approved the sale of most of Corus Entertainment's radio stations in Quebec, including CIME-FM, to Cogeco. The sale closed February 1, 2011, and by August 2011, the station adopted the tri-oval Rythme FM logo on CIME-FM; however the CIME branding and hot adult contemporary stayed because of the adult contemporary format already heard on nearby flagship and sister station CFGL-FM Laval. As a result, programming is different, save for majority of nighttime programming, which largely simulcasts CFGL-FM.

On August 22, 2016, the station left the Rythme network and adopted a new slogan: "La Couleur Musicale des Laurentides".
