= CITF =

CITF may refer to:

- Criminal Investigation Task Force, United States government agency
- CITF-FM, radio station in Quebec
