= CBVR =

CBVR may refer to:

- CBVR-FM, a radio rebroadcaster (103.5 FM) licensed to New Richmond, Quebec, Canada, rebroadcasting CBVE-FM
- CBVR-TV, a television retransmitter (channel 27) licensed to New Richmond, Quebec, Canada, retransmitting CBMT
- Content-based video retrieval, a conceptual extension of Content-based image retrieval (CBIR) into the video domain.
