= CBVB =

CBVB may refer to:

- CBVB-FM, a radio rebroadcaster (103.7 FM) licensed to Chandler, Quebec, Canada, rebroadcasting CBVE-FM
- CBVB-TV, a television retransmitter (channel 23) licensed to Chandler, Quebec, Canada, retransmitting CBMT
