= CBVE =

CBVE may refer to:

- CBVE-FM, a radio station (104.7 FM) licensed to Quebec City, Quebec, Canada
- CBVE-TV, a television retransmitter (channel 5) licensed to Quebec City, Quebec, Canada, retransmitting CBMT
