= CBVN =

CBVN may refer to:

- CBVN-FM, a radio retransmitter (101.5 FM) licensed to New Carlisle, Quebec, Canada, retransmitting CBVE-FM
- CBVN-TV, a television rebroadcaster (channel 45) licensed to New Carlisle, Quebec, Canada, rebroadcasting CBMT
