= CFAP =

CFAP may refer to:

- Coronavirus Food Assistance Program, United States Department of Agriculture program during the COVID-19 pandemic
- CFAP-DT, virtual channel 2.1 (UHF digital channel 39), television station licensed to Quebec City, Quebec, Canada
