= CBVF =

CBVF may refer to:

- CBVF-FM, a radio retransmitter (100.5 FM) licensed to Port-Daniel, Quebec, Canada, retransmitting CBVE-FM
- CBVF-TV, a television rebroadcaster (channel 16) licensed to Port-Daniel, Quebec, Canada, rebroadcasting CBMT
