= CBVG =

CBVG may refer to:

- CBVG-FM, a radio rebroadcaster (88.5 FM) licensed to Gaspe, Quebec, Canada, rebroadcasting CBVE-FM
- CBVG-TV, a television retransmitter (channel 18) licensed to Gaspe, Quebec, Canada, retransmitting CBMT
