= CHOA-FM =

Radio station in Rouyn-Noranda

Coordinates: 48°15′55″N 79°02′36″W

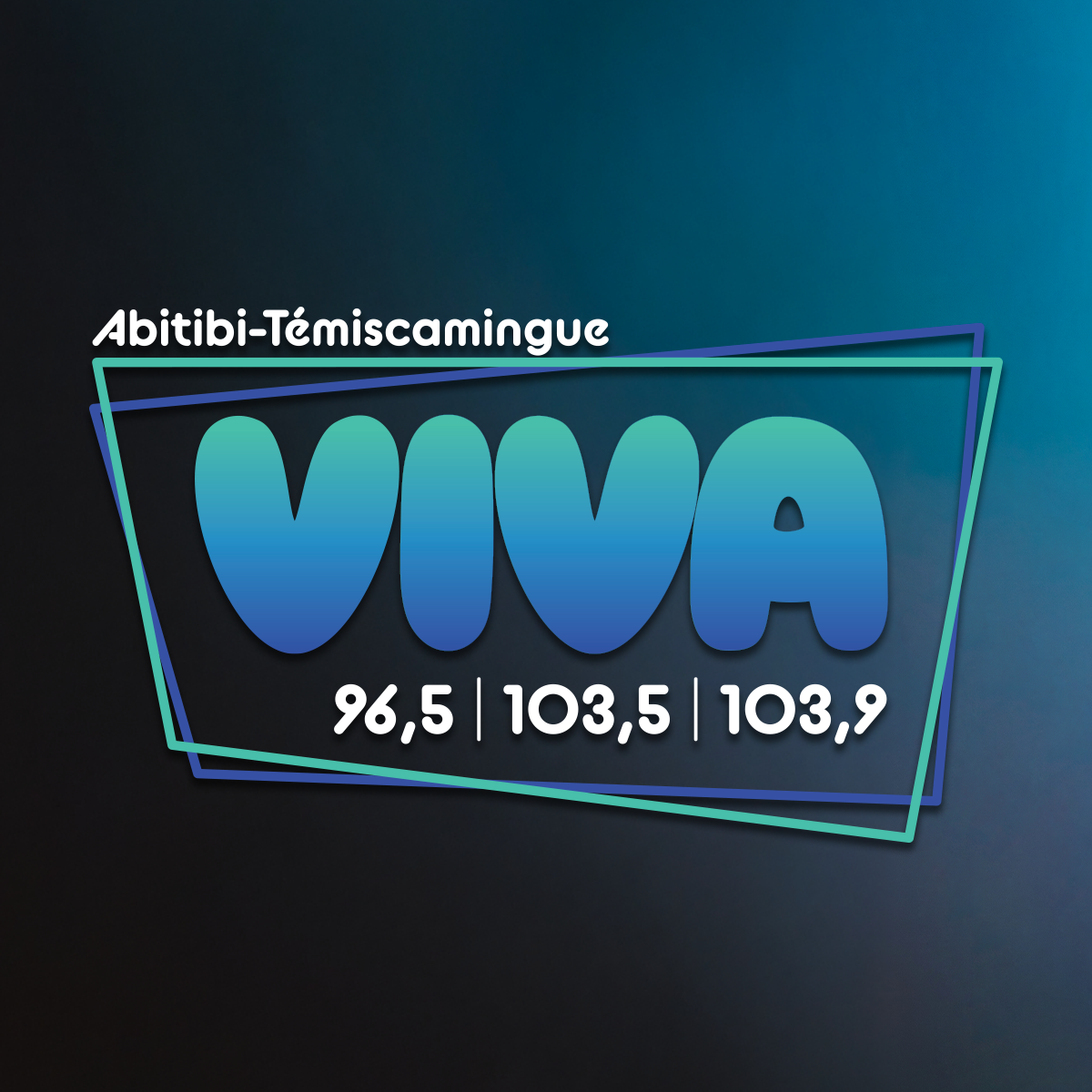
- Rouyn-Noranda, Quebec; Canada
- Broadcast area: Abitibi-Témiscamingue
- Frequency: 96.5 MHz
- Branding: Viva 96.5

Programming
- Language: French
- Format: Adult contemporary

Ownership
- Owner: Arsenal Media
- Sister stations: CHGO-FM CJGO-FM

History
- First air date: September 21, 1990

Technical information
- Class: C
- ERP: 61.1 kW peak horizontal polarization only
- HAAT: 204 meters (669 ft)

Links
- Website: viva965.com

CHOA-FM is a French-language Canadian radio station, broadcasting at 96.5 FM in Rouyn-Noranda, Quebec. The station has an adult contemporary format branded as Viva 96.5.

== History ==
Logo for Planète, 2008–2015

Owned and operated by Arsenal Media, the station aired an adult contemporary format from its inception, both under independent branding and as an affiliate of Astral Media's RockDétente and Cogeco's Rythme FM networks. The station briefly adopted a modern rock format branded as Radio X after RNC Media acquired CHOI in Quebec City in 2006, but later reverted to the Couleur FM name and format, and was rebranded as Planète in 2008. The Radio X branding later resurfaced at sister stations CHGO-FM and CJGO-FM.

CHOA also has rebroadcast transmitters in Val-d'Or (103.5) and La Sarre (103.9). RNC applied in 1996 to convert CHOA's retransmitter in Val-d'Or into an originating station, but was denied because the market could not support a new commercial station.

In December 2014, it was announced that CHOA-FM would become an affiliate of Cogeco's Rythme FM network, starting on March 9, 2015. The station was the second Rythme FM outlet owned by RNC, with CHLX-FM Gatineau being the first.

Logo for Wow FM, 2017–2025

On August 7. 2017, CHOA dropped the "Rhythme" brand and re-branded as Wow FM. CHLX had similarly re-branded.

In January 2025, CHOA dropped Wow FM and flipped to Viva FM.
