= CJRM-FM (Montreal) =

Former radio station in Montreal, Quebec

- Montreal, Quebec; Canada
- Frequency: 98.5 MHz

Programming
- Language: French
- Format: Classical music

History
- First air date: September 30, 1965
- Last air date: June 24, 1968

Technical information
- ERP: 100,000 watts

CJRM-FM was a French-language Canadian radio station located in Montreal, Quebec. It opened on September 30, 1965, and closed on June 24, 1968, due to financial difficulties.

The station broadcast on 98.5 MHz with an effective radiated power of 100,000 watts using an omnidirectional antenna (class C1). It had a classical music format.

Licensed as one of the first standalone FM stations in Canada, the station's budget was so tight that it had only four employees (which was unusual at the time for a radio station), and it relied entirely on newspapers as a source for news bulletins. The station was plagued with serious technical and financial difficulties; listeners received the station with indifference.

One consequence of the failure of CJRM-FM to succeed with its classical music format was that the Canadian Radio-television and Telecommunications Commission (CRTC) rejected for decades new applications to open a private classical music station in Montreal. When the CRTC finally gave Jean-Pierre Coallier permission to open CJPX-FM in 1997, that station would turn out to be a success.

The 98.5 MHz frequency was reactivated in the Montreal area on April 9, 1977, when CIEL-FM (now CHMP-FM) went on the air.
