= CHPR-FM =

Radio station in Hawkesbury, Ontario

Coordinates: 45°34′39″N 74°38′08″W

Simulcast with CJLA-FM in Lachute, Quebec
- Hawkesbury, Ontario; Canada
- Frequency: 102.1 MHz
- Branding: Cime 104.9 102.1 FM

Programming
- Language: French
- Format: Adult contemporary

Ownership
- Owner: Cogeco
- Sister stations: CJLA-FM

History
- First air date: 1976
- Former frequencies: 1110 kHz (1976–1983)

Technical information
- Class: A
- ERP: 0.78 kW
- HAAT: 21 meters (69 ft)

Links
- Website: lachutehawkesbury.cime.fm

CHPR-FM is a Canadian radio station, which airs at 102.1 FM in Hawkesbury, Ontario. Owned and operated by Cogeco following its 2018 acquisition of most of the stations formerly owned by RNC Media, the station airs a francophone adult contemporary format branded as Wow 104,9 102,1 FM. The station airs a mix of locally produced programming and simulcasting of RNC's CJLA-FM in Lachute, Quebec.

Despite simulcasting the majority of its programming, CHPR-FM is one of only four all-francophone commercial radio stations licensed to communities in Ontario; the other three stations are all in Northeastern Ontario and are owned by Le5 Communications. CHPR-FM is also Cogeco's only broadcasting property outside Quebec, apart from its cable systems.

== History ==
CHPR was originally launched in 1976 as a daytimer on 1110 kHz AM radio (to protect WBT Charlotte, North Carolina and KFAB Omaha, Nebraska) to rebroadcast the programming of Cornwall's CFIX. In 1983, ownership of the stations was transferred to Guy Vaillancourt, who also owned CJLA.

Due to the area's unique circumstances as a predominantly franco-ontarian community with limited local media service due to the region's proximity to the Montreal market, the station was also licensed at that time to launch a low power FM repeater to improve reception and provide a nighttime service. Vaillancourt shutdown CFIX that year, and subsequently transferred CHPR's programming source to CJLA. In 1985, Vaillancourt committed to produce 32 hours per week of local programming on CHPR, with CJLA providing the station's programming the rest of the time.

In 1987, the FM transmitter increased its signal to 780 watts. The AM transmitter was discontinued at that time. Also that year, CHPR and CJLA affiliated with the Radiomutuel network. The following year, the stations were acquired by Radio Fusion, a subsidiary of RNC Media.

In 1997, RNC Media became the direct licensee of the stations after a corporate reorganization. CHPR was also licensed to increase its signal to 3 kW, and to reduce its local programming to 15 hours per week.

In the fall of 2006, the station changed to a more oldies-leaning AC format as Lov Radio, even though the AC currents remain on the station. The station rebranded as Planète Lov' in August 2008, because of RNC rebranding most of their stations to the Planète name. By 2010, CHPR-FM decreased the amount of oldies played on the station.
