= CHIK-FM =

Radio station in Quebec City

Coordinates: 46°49′22″N 71°29′41″W

- Quebec City, Quebec; Canada
- Broadcast area: Capitale-Nationale
- Frequency: 98.9 MHz
- Branding: Énergie 98.9

Programming
- Language: French
- Format: Mainstream rock
- Affiliations: Énergie

Ownership
- Owner: Bell Media
- Sister stations: CITF-FM, CFAP-DT

History
- First air date: July 29, 1982

Technical information
- Licensing authority: CRTC
- Class: C1
- ERP: 41,000 watts
- HAAT: 413 metres (1,355 ft)

Links
- Webcast: Listen live
- Website: radioenergie.ca/quebec.html

CHIK-FM is a French-language radio station located in Quebec City, Quebec, Canada.

Owned and operated by Bell Media, it broadcasts on 98.9 FM with an effective radiated power of 41,000 watts (class C1) using an omnidirectional antenna. The station's transmitter is located at Mount Bélair.

The station has a mainstream rock format and is part of the "Énergie" network which operates across Quebec.

CHIK's last logo as an Énergie station.

CHIK started operations on July 29, 1982, as a sister station to the now-defunct CJRP and originally had an easy listening format, similar to CITF-FM and CHOI-FM as per their respective conditions of licence. CHIK switched to a CHR format a few years after opening because there were too many easy listening stations in the Quebec City radio market.

Since 2011, CHIK has more local programming than other Énergie stations around Quebec, with local DJs from 5:30 a.m.-8 p.m. weekdays and 6 a.m.-7 p.m. weekends.

CHIK logo as NRJ
