= CHLX-FM =

Radio station in Gatineau

Coordinates: 45°26′34″N 75°43′58″W

- Gatineau, Quebec; Canada
- Broadcast area: National Capital Region
- Frequency: 97.1 MHz
- Branding: 97.1 Rythme FM

Programming
- Language: French
- Format: Adult contemporary
- Affiliations: Rythme FM

Ownership
- Owner: RNC Media
- Sister stations: CHOT-DT, CFGS-DT

History
- First air date: September 23, 2002

Technical information
- Class: B1
- ERP: 11,200 watts
- HAAT: 71.5 metres (235 ft)

Links
- Website: rythme971.ca

CHLX-FM (97.1 MHz) is a commercial radio station in Gatineau, Quebec, serving the National Capital Region including Ottawa. A francophone and a Rythme FM affiliate station owned by RNC Media, CHLX airs a format of French-language adult contemporary with some jazz.

It is owned by RNC Media and is branded as Rythme FM 97.1. CHLX's radio studios are on Jean-Proulx Avenue in Gatineau, while its transmitter is located in Camp Fortune, within Gatineau Park.

== History ==
CHLX was licensed by the CRTC in 2001, and launched on September 23, 2002.

It was briefly branded as Classique 97,1 before becoming Couleur FM, airing classical music. In 2008, after a licence amendment was accepted by the CRTC, it became Planète 97,1, an adult contemporary-formatted station, with 20% of its airtime devoted to jazz.

On July 11, 2014, it was announced that CHLX would flip to Hot AC as 97.1 Rythme FM on August 25, as part of a licensing deal between Cogeco and RNC. CHLX became the first non-Cogeco station to carry the Rythme FM format (other than CJEC-FM Quebec City, which was briefly affiliated with Rythme FM after being sold by Cogeco to another broadcaster). As of October 2014, it was still broadcasting two hours a day of jazz music, but since June 2017 the CRTC amended the licence removing the requirement to broadcast such genres.

In January 2017, the station dropped Rhythme FM and re-branded as Wow 97.1.

In January 17, 2025, the station returned into the Rythme FM affiliation.
