= CBVX-FM =

Radio station in Quebec City, Canada

- Quebec City, Quebec; Canada
- Frequency: 95.3 MHz
- Branding: Ici Musique

Programming
- Format: Public Music

Ownership
- Owner: Canadian Broadcasting Corporation
- Sister stations: CBV-FM, CBVE-FM, CBVT-DT

History
- First air date: 1974

Technical information
- ERP: 10.86 kW peak (Vertical); 64.6 kW peak (Horizontal)
- HAAT: 477.6 meters (1,567 ft)

Links
- Website: ICI Musique

CBVX-FM is a Canadian radio station, which broadcasts Radio-Canada's Ici Musique network at 95.3 FM in Quebec City. The Class-C station broadcasts at 64.6 kilowatts from a transmitter at Mount Bélair.

== Transmitters ==
Rebroadcasters of CBVX-FM
City of licence	Identifier	Frequency	Power	Class	RECNet	CRTC Decision	Notes
Baie-Saint-Paul	CBVX-FM-3	88.9 FM	2,289 watts	A	Query	2002-121	47°25′26.04″N 70°31′28.92″W
La Malbaie	CBVX-FM-2	91.5 FM	960 watts	A	Query		47°40′59.88″N 70°8′4.92″W
Sainte-Anne-de-Beaupré	CBVX-FM-1	89.9 FM	250 watts	A1	Query	99-118	46°57′28.08″N 70°58′22.08″W
