= CKLX-FM =

Radio station in Montreal

Coordinates: 45°30′12″N 73°35′47″W

- Montreal, Quebec; Canada
- Broadcast area: Greater Montreal
- Frequency: 91.9 MHz (FM)
- Branding: BPM Sports 91.9 Montréal

Programming
- Language: French
- Format: Sports

Ownership
- Owner: Arsenal Media
- Sister stations: CFEI-FM, CFZZ-FM

History
- First air date: December 14, 2004

Technical information
- Licensing authority: CRTC
- Class: B1
- ERP: 1,780 watts average 4,675 watts peak
- HAAT: 193 meters (633 ft)

Links
- Website: bpmsports.ca

CKLX-FM (91.9 MHz) is a French-language radio station located in Montreal, Quebec, Canada. Owned and operated by Arsenal Media, it airs a sports talk format as flagship station of Arsenal's BPM Sports network. It is the French-language flagship station of CF Montreal of Major League Soccer and the Laval Rocket of the American Hockey League.

CKLX-FM's studios are located on West Laurier Avenue in the Le Plateau-Mont-Royal neighbourhood of Montreal. Its transmitter, located atop Mount Royal, uses a directional antenna with an average effective radiated power of 1,780 watts and a peak effective radiated power of 4,675 watts (Class B1). It also is heard nationally on Channel 978 on the Bell Satellite TV radio station lineup.

== History ==
Logo as Planète Jazz 91,9, 2008–2012.

The station began broadcasting on December 14, 2004. It had a smooth jazz format. From December 2004 until August 2012, it called itself Couleur Jazz before being re-branded as Planète Jazz 91,9 on September 1, 2008.

On January 13, 2012, RNC Media applied to the Canadian Radio-television and Telecommunications Commission (CRTC) to amend its licence conditions to allow 50% of its programming to be spoken-word and talk programming, with the remainder being its existing smooth jazz format (though its license also included other forms of jazz) as well as blues and additional special interest music genres. Its application hinted that the station would take a direction more towards its Quebec City sister station, CHOI-FM.

Logo as CHOI Radio X Montreal, 2012–2014.

On August 20, 2012, CKLX-FM flipped to the new CHOI Radio X format, sharing the branding with its sister station. The station primarily aired talk radio programming, but aired music programming during certain dayparts to remain in compliance with its license at the time. These included blocks of jazz programming on evening and weekend mornings, and rock music programming on weekends under the name La Garage. The hybrid format remained in effect pending CRTC approval to allow CKLX-FM to switch to a mainly spoken-word format. The station's first effort to gain approval was denied by the CRTC on March 14, 2013. On April 8, 2014, the CRTC approved CKLX's request to discard its music requirements as part of its license renewal, in exchange for a requirement to carry a minimum of 50% spoken word and talk programming. While CKLX's new license took effect on September 1, 2014, the format change went into effect immediately.

On September 9, 2014, the station rebranded as Radio 9, heralding a new lineup including former RDI personality Louis Lemieux.

=== As a sports station ===
Despite the changes, the station's ratings remained lackluster, due to continuous competition from the region's leading francophone talk station, 98.5 CHMP-FM. As a result, the station dismissed four of its on-air hosts, including Lemieux, in June 2015. At that time, CKLX announced that it would flip to a sports talk format. However, CKLX-FM continued to face competition from CHMP, as that station had the rights to most of Montreal's professional sports teams.

CKLX adopted its new format and branding, 91.9 Sport, on August 31, 2015. Its weekday lineup initially consisted of sports talk programs throughout the day, followed by condensed highlight programs during the nighttime hours. Les légendes du rock continues to air on weekends. Several personalities from CKAC's previous sports talk era joined the station to host programs on the new lineup, including Michel Langevin (who co-hosts the morning show Du sport ... le matin! with Enrico Ciccone), and Jean-Charles Lajoie (who hosts its noon and afternoon drive time programs). In August 2016, RNC Media announced the addition of new live programs, including the weeknight Sports Extra with Meeker Guerrier (focusing on post-game coverage of Montreal Canadiens games during hockey season), and weekend evening Le 5 @ 7. Numeris ratings indicated that the new sports talk format had achieved the station's highest ratings in five years, with a 2.4% share.

In November 2016, the station announced that it had acquired the radio rights to the Laval Rocket, the Canadiens' American Hockey League affiliate, beginning in the 2017–18 AHL season under a five-year deal.

On August 28, 2018, RNC Media announced the sale of CKLX and CHOI to Leclerc Communication, owner of Quebec City's CJEC-FM and CFEL-FM. At first, the cost was not made public, but was later revealed to be $19 million. Citing a lack of revenue from the sports format, Leclerc filed a request with the CRTC to change CKLX's licensing to allow a music format, so that it could switch to a modern adult contemporary format similar to CJEC. The CRTC approved the deal, under the condition that Leclerc divest one of its stations in Quebec City. However, as Leclerc refused to agree to this condition, the company called off the purchase.

On January 19, 2021, the station announced that it had acquired the French radio rights to CF Montreal of Major League Soccer through the 2022 season, marking the station's first major professional play-by-play rights.

In August 2022, RNC Media announced that it would extend CKLX's programming to sister stations CFTX-FM in Gatineau and CHXX-FM in Quebec City (which previously aired a CHR format as Vibe), with all three stations rebranding as BPM Sports beginning August 29, 2022. Due to CRTC license restrictions requiring them to carry music programming, the other two stations will not carry CKLX's play-by-play broadcasts, and will carry music programming outside of the network's daily lineup. Most of the network's programming will continue to come from Montreal, barring the new evening show La Tribune Capitale, which is hosted by Jordan Boivin from Quebec City. In late-August 2024, former CKGM host Tony Marinaro moved to CKLX to host a mid-morning show.

In November 2025, RNC announced the sale of all three BPM Sports stations to Arsenal Media pending CRTC approval. Making it CKLX-FM a sister stations to CFEI-FM and CFZZ-FM The CRTC approved the purchase on July 14, 2026.
