= Jeff Fillion =

Canadian radio host and businessman

- Born: Jean-François Fillion; Chicoutimi, Quebec, Canada
- Website: Official website

Jeff Fillion (born Jean-François Fillion), is a radio host and businessman in Quebec, Canada. He is often associated with a politically incorrect radio style known as trash radio (Radio poubelle).

== Media – radio career ==
Fillion began his career in his home town of Chicoutimi in the late 1980s, working for CFIX-FM. Most of his reputation comes from his stint, from 1997 to 2005, as morning man with radio station CHOI-FM in Quebec City, Quebec, Canada. However, his very controversial and politically incorrect comments, combined with those of André Arthur, resulted in the Canadian Radio-television and Telecommunications Commission (CRTC) refusing to renew the station's licence in July 2004. The station and license were bought by RNC Media in June 2007 without interruption to its broadcasting.

He was fired on March 17, 2005, in the fallout of the trial from Sophie Chiasson against him and his then-employer. The judgement was particularly severe, with the judge noting that the comments made by Jeff Fillion regarding Chiasson were "sexist, mean, incited hatred, were without cause, wounding and injurious. These comments are a threat to the dignity and honour of human kind in general and particularly to Miss Chiasson.". The participants in the radio show (Fillion and gang) referred to the plaintiff as "a consummate liar," "a cat in heat," as well as "a leech on (hockey player) Alexandre Daigle," "an airhead" and repeatedly suggested Chiasson used sex to get jobs. Miss Chiasson was awarded $340,000 CAD in punitive damages.. After numerous rumours to the effect that he would be hired by other radio stations in the Quebec City market (which turned out to be unfounded) or by a satellite radio group, he announced his intention of launching a subscription-only Internet radio service. RadioPirate.com was launched on March 17, 2006, exactly a year after he was fired by CHOI-FM. His radio show was also broadcast on XM Satellite Radio, channel 156 until his contract was nullified on August 11, 2011 by the newly merged SiriusXM Canada. His internet station still lives today and a free light version is also available. Fillion was hired by Bell Media and was back on the air beginning March 3, 2014 with his show "Jeff Fillion" on NRJ 98.9, a Quebec City radio station.

On April 19, 2016, Fillion was suspended indefinitely by Bell Media for a tweet that he posted about an interview that Alexandre Taillefer had with Guy A. Lepage on the French Canadian show Tout le monde en parle (Quebec). The tweet linked to an article which summarized the interview. The only other content of the tweet was two identical emoji faces which Fillion included, seemingly because they resemble Taillefer. Fillion's tweet was interpreted by his opponents as trying to ridicule Taillefer who was blaming the company Amazon.com for the suicide of his son. Although he quickly deleted his tweet, Fillion was suspended by Bell Media after Taillefer, in an interview with Paul Arcand, publicly questioned the fact that Bell Media was still employing him.

On April 20, 2016, Bell Media announced that Fillion was not an employee of the company anymore.

== Political and social views ==
His politics are a mix of conservatism and libertarianism.

He rejects separatism not out of any real attachment to Canada, but more because of his perception that sovereignty would only help to increase socialism in Quebec. His father, Gilbert Fillion, was a one-term Member of Parliament for the Bloc Québécois, in the riding of Chicoutimi from 1993 to 1997.

He is an avid critic of the way the media treats global warming. He recognizes the presence of global warming but suggests that human action has little to do with it.

Fillion has an interest in popular economics, wishing to improve the basic level of economic literacy of Quebecers.

He was an avid critic of the Quebec City mayor Andrée Boucher who, he believes, kept the city in a state of gathering dust. He believes that NHL hockey should come back to Quebec City, notably by an ownership effort from Red Bull. He proposes that a new arena should be built in a public-private partnership, a project similar to what led Winnipeg to build the new MTS Centre.

Fillion has suggested that a new breed of Quebec politicians should regroup, notably identifying leaders such as ex-cabinet member Joseph Facal, economist Nathalie Elgrably, radiologist Gaetan Barrette and political reporter Michel Hébert.

== 2009 mayoral bid ==
In October 2009, Fillion announced he would run against current Quebec City mayor Regis Labaume. His platform consisted of getting new infrastructure for the city and better spending ethics. He placed second to incumbent mayor Regis Labeaume, with 8.6% of the votes cast.

== See also ==
- Radio Parallèle
- André Arthur
