= CJLA-FM =

Radio station in Lachute, Quebec

Coordinates: 45°40′38″N 74°22′14″W

Simulcast with CHPR-FM in Hawkesbury, Ontario

Lachute, Quebec; Canada
- Frequency: 104.9 MHz
- Branding: Cime 104.9

Programming
- Language: French
- Format: adult contemporary

Ownership
- Owner: Cogeco
- Sister stations: CHPR-FM

History
- First air date: 1974
- Former frequencies: 630 kHz
- Call sign meaning: Lachute or the Laurentides

Technical information
- Class: A
- ERP: 3,000 watts
- HAAT: 53 meters (174 ft)

Links
- Website: lachutehawkesbury.cime.fm

CJLA-FM is a French-language Canadian radio station located in Lachute, Quebec.

Owned and operated by Cogeco following its 2018 acquisition of most of the stations formerly owned by RNC Media, it broadcasts on 104.9 MHz using an omnidirectional antenna with an effective radiated power of 3,000 watts (class A). The station airs an adult contemporary format (with a heavy emphasis towards oldies since 2006) branded as Wow; it was known as Lov Radio from 2006 until September 2008, when almost all RNC stations rebranded as Planète).

Part of CJLA-FM's programming is simulcast on co-owned CHPR-FM in neighbouring Hawkesbury, Ontario on 102.1. Its musical playlist is similar to the Montreal French adult contemporary stations CFGL-FM and CITE-FM (although the playlist of CFGL-FM, a sister station to CJLA-FM, is more closer due to CFGL-FM playing more oldies/classic hits than CITE-FM).

== History ==
The station was launched in 1974 on AM 630 kHz by Radio Lachute, and was acquired by Guy Vaillancourt in 1980. Vaillancourt subsequently acquired CFIX in Cornwall, Ontario in 1983, and shut that station down but retained its rebroadcaster CHPR in Hawkesbury as a rebroadcaster of CJLA.

After receiving CRTC approval to convert from the AM band to the FM band in 1985, the station moved to the FM band in February 1986, being one of the first AM stations permitted to do in Canada. As an AM station, CJLA was one of the few stations authorized to increase its power at night, from 500 watts to 1,000 watts. The station switched its call sign from CJLA-FM to CJGO-FM in 2000, but quickly reverted to CJLA-FM the following year; the reason for these changes is unknown.

By 2010, a majority of the classic hits songs were reduced in the playlist.
