= Radio Classique =

French radio station

- France

Programming
- Format: Classical music

Ownership
- Owner: Groupe Les Échos-Le Parisien of LVMH

History
- First air date: January 1983

Links
- Website: radioclassique.fr

Radio Classique is a French commercial radio station created in 1983 that broadcasts mainly classical music. Its programmes also contain segments of economic and political news. Michèle Benbunan is the President of the Radio station.

Between April and June 2026, the audience was 978,000 daily listeners.

Radio Classique was launched in January 1983 by Pierre Amalou, led by former producers of France Musique. At its inception, it appealed for contributions from its listeners who - in exchange for a subscription - received the detailed program of the station. Radio Classique also broadcasts a few commercials for partners who took part in sponsorship deals, and it was part of the Groupe Expansion.

In the fall of 2005, the station tried to break down barriers to classical music, highlighting the benefits of listening to classical. The station then repositioned around the "rejuvenation" (its new slogan "Ressourcez-vous"), with a goal of making classical music more accessible: a more friendly tone, film music, music on demand, games, etc. The editorial policy that prevailed from the station's beginning was significantly bent. On the one hand, the complete dissemination of works gave way to the dissemination of excerpts of works (symphony movements, extracts from concerts ...). On the other hand, the recruitment of media personalities or celebrities replaced the neutral and objective presentation in favour of facilitators actively customizing music programs.

Since 2007, Radio Classique is part of Groupe Les Échos-Le Parisien, the media division of LVMH Moët Hennessy Louis Vuitton.

== See also ==
- Classic FM - a British commercial classical radio station
- Radio-Classique Quebec CJSQ-FM - a Canadian classical radio station
- Klassik Radio - a German commercial classical radio station
- Radio Classica - an Italian commercial classical radio station
- Radio-Classique Montréal CJPX-FM - a former Canadian commercial classical radio station
