= CJEB-FM =

Radio station in Trois-Rivières

Coordinates: 46°29′27″N 72°38′58″W

- Trois-Rivières, Quebec; Canada
- Broadcast area: Mauricie
- Frequency: 100.1 MHz
- Branding: 100.1 Rythme FM

Programming
- Language: French
- Format: Adult contemporary
- Affiliations: Rythme FM

Ownership
- Owner: Cogeco; (Cogeco Diffusion Inc.)
- Sister stations: CKOB-FM

History
- First air date: June 2004

Technical information
- Class: C1
- ERP: 30,610 watts; (maximum ERP 64,110 watts)
- HAAT: 358.9 metres (1,177 ft)

Links
- Website: mauricie.rythmefm.com

CJEB-FM is a French-language radio station located in Trois-Rivières, Quebec, Canada.

Owned and operated by Cogeco, it broadcasts on 100.1 MHz using a directional antenna with an average effective radiated power of 43,050 watts and a peak effective radiated power of 81,100 watts (class C1).

The station has an adult contemporary format since it opened in June 2004 and is part of the Rythme FM network which operates across much of Quebec.
