= CITF-FM =

Radio station in Quebec City

Coordinates: 46°49′22″N 71°29′41″W

- Quebec City, Quebec; Canada
- Broadcast area: Capitale-Nationale
- Frequency: 107.5 MHz
- Branding: 107,5 Rouge

Programming
- Language: French
- Format: Adult contemporary
- Affiliations: Rouge FM

Ownership
- Owner: Bell Media; (Bell Media Radio)
- Sister stations: CHIK-FM, CFAP-DT

History
- First air date: July 22, 1982
- Call sign meaning: Disambiguation of sister station CITE-FM in Montreal

Technical information
- Class: C1
- ERP: 37,000 watts
- HAAT: 429.5 metres (1,409 ft)

Links
- Webcast: Listen Live
- Website: rougefm.ca/quebec.html

CITF-FM is a French-language Canadian radio station located in Quebec City, Quebec, Canada.

Owned and operated by Bell Media, it broadcasts on 107.5 MHz with an effective radiated power of 37,000 watts (class C1) using an omnidirectional antenna. The station's transmitter is located at Mount Bélair.

The station has an adult contemporary format since 1990 and is part of the "Rouge FM" network which operates across Quebec and Eastern Ontario.

== History ==
CITF-FM started operations on July 22, 1982 as a sister station to the now-defunct CKCV 1280 with a beautiful music format. The latter closed in September 1990, as part of a failed attempt of Telemedia (then owner of both stations) to buy CHRC 800, as at the time owners were limited to only one AM station and one FM station per market. (Although the purchase of CKCV was denied by the Canadian Radio-television and Telecommunications Commission (CRTC), that station remained dark.)

Up until 1990, CITF-FM had a beautiful music format. The station switched to adult contemporary in 1990 and the station was renamed CITF Rock-Détente.

In 2004, Astral Media revamped the Rock Détente network with a new logo. This resulted in "Rock-Détente" being renamed to simply 107,5 RockDétente. As such, the station no longer publicly uses its callsign (although the callsign was resurrected as station identification in 2011).

CITF-FM is programmed locally with their own staff, personalities and playlist, independent from the rest of the Rouge FM network. On August 18, 2011, at 4:00 p.m. EDT, the station ended its longtime 21-year run with the "RockDétente" branding. All "RockDétente" stations, including CITF, rebranded as "Rouge". On CITF-FM, the last song under the "RockDétente" branding was "Salut les amoureux" by Joe Dassin, followed by a tribute of the branding. Being locally programmed, it was the only station not to sign off "RockDétente" with "Pour que tu m'aimes encore" by Celine Dion. The first song under "Rouge" was "I Gotta Feeling" by Black Eyed Peas. As a Rouge station, CITF-FM remains locally programmed, aside from a few network programs it carries.
