= Journal of Evidence-Based Integrative Medicine =

- Discipline: Alternative medicine
- Language: English
- Edited by: Bruce Buehler

Publication details
- Former names: Complementary Health Practice Review, Journal of Evidence-Based Complementary and Alternative Medicine
- History: 1995-present
- Publisher: SAGE Publications
- Frequency: Quarterly

Standard abbreviations
- ISO 4: J. Evid.-Based Integr. Med.

Indexing
- ISSN: 2515-690X
- LCCN: 2018243065

Links
- Journal homepage; Online access; Online archive

The Journal of Evidence-Based Integrative Medicine (JEBIM), published previously as the Journal of Evidence-Based Complementary and Alternative Medicine (JEBCAM) and also as Complementary Health Practice Review (CHPR), is a quarterly peer-reviewed medical journal that covers hypothesis-driven and evidence-based research in the field of alternative medicine. The editor-in-chief is Bruce Buehler (University of Nebraska Medical Center). The journal was established in 1995 and is published by SAGE Publications.

It absorbed Integrative Medicine Insights (ISSN 1177-3936).

== Abstracting and indexing ==
The journal is abstracted and indexed in:

- CINAHL
- EBSCO databases
- Index Medicus/MEDLINE/PubMed
- InfoTrac
- PsycINFO
- Scopus
