= CFML-FM =

Campus radio station in British Columbia, Canada

- Burnaby, British Columbia; Canada
- Broadcast area: Greater Vancouver
- Frequency: 107.9 MHz
- Branding: Evolution 107.9

Programming
- Format: Adult album alternative

Ownership
- Owner: British Columbia Institute of Technology; (B.C.I.T. Radio Society)

History
- First air date: January 1982
- Former call signs: VF2448 (pre-launch)

Technical information
- Class: LP
- ERP: 12 watts (Horizontal polarization only)
- HAAT: 144.1 metres (473 ft)
- Transmitter coordinates: 49.226234°N 123.001288°W

Links
- Webcast: Listen Live
- Website: evolution1079.com

CFML-FM is the campus radio station of the British Columbia Institute of Technology in Burnaby, British Columbia, Canada.

== History ==
The station began broadcasting in January 1982 at 650 kHz on the AM band and on cable FM at 104.5 MHz. On October 26, 1984, the CRTC approved B.C.I.T. Radio Society's application to change CFML's frequency from 650 kHz to 940 kHz, as local station CISL swapped frequencies from 940 kHz to 650 kHz. The station first ran a Top 40/CHR format, but later transitioned towards adult contemporary by 1986, and back towards Top 40 by the end of the decade. On March 7, 2006, the station began using the name Evolution 107.9 FM upon the launch of its new location on the FM dial at 107.9 MHz.

The station's transmitter, located on the Metrotown towers in Burnaby, is licensed for 12 watts ERP. The signal can now be heard on cable and on the FM dial. Its FM signal reaches mainly within the Burnaby city limits at the moment. Its current adult album alternative format consists mostly of independent, rock, and adult alternative. It is staffed by second-year students in the Radio Arts & Entertainment Program.

The station currently uses the on-air brand name Evolution 107.9.

A few references give the station's call sign as VF2448, a call sign format used in Canada to denote low-power rebroadcasters. This was the call sign temporarily assigned to the station when it ran its pre-launch transmitter tests, but has never been the station's official call sign as a fully operational station, although Industry Canada's database has not been updated to reflect that yet.

The carrier's current AM signal on 940 kHz continued despite the launch of the FM signal; it was not until March 4, 2013, when the CRTC approved B.C.I.T. Radio Society's application to revoke CFML's broadcasting license for the carrier's current AM signal.
