= CJMF-FM =

Radio station in Quebec City

Coordinates: 46°49′22″N 71°29′41″W

- Quebec City, Quebec; Canada
- Frequency: 93.3 MHz
- Branding: FM 93

Programming
- Language: French
- Format: Talk radio/mainstream rock

Ownership
- Owner: Cogeco; (Cogeco Diffusion Inc.)
- Sister stations: CFOM-FM

History
- First air date: September 15, 1979
- Call sign meaning: Modulation de fréquence, French for "frequency modulation" (FM)

Technical information
- Class: C1
- ERP: 32,960 watts
- HAAT: 445 meters (1,460 ft)

Links
- Website: fm93.com

CJMF-FM is a French-language Canadian radio station located in Quebec City, Quebec, Canada.

Owned and operated by Cogeco, it broadcasts on 93.3 MHz with an effective radiated power of 32,960 watts (class C1) using an omnidirectional antenna. The station's transmitter is located at Mount Bélair.

The station has a hybrid talk and mainstream rock format and identifies itself as FM 93. Prior to September 2009, the station was known as Le 93,3 with a classic rock/talk format. The station's playlist, however, is heavy on classic rock still.

CJMF-FM was the #1 station in the Quebec City market in the late 1980s, especially while it aired "Le Zoo" with Gilles Parent, Alain Dumas and Michel Morin, from 1984 to 1990.

On January 5, 2012, Cogeco applied with the CRTC to amend its license conditions to increase its talk programming to 75% of the schedule, with music filling the remainder. If approved, CJMF-FM plans to carrying talk programming from Monday to Friday, with its mainstream rock format restricted to weekends. The CRTC approved the station's request on August 22, 2012, which allows the station to expand its spoken-word programming beyond the prior limits of 50%.

In September 2012, it was announced that radio broadcasts of the Laval Rouge et Or and the Quebec Remparts will move to CJMF after the Remparts' owned-and-operated station, CHRC closed at the end of September.
