= CBV-FM =

ICI Radio-Canada Première station in Quebec City

- Quebec City, Quebec; Canada
- Broadcast area: Capitale-Nationale, Chaudière-Appalaches
- Frequency: 106.3 MHz
- Branding: Ici Radio-Canada Première

Programming
- Format: News/Talk

Ownership
- Owner: Canadian Broadcasting Corporation
- Sister stations: CBVX-FM, CBVE-FM

History
- First air date: September 29, 1934
- Former call signs: CRCK (1934–1938)
- Former frequencies: 950 kHz (1934–1941); 980 kHz (1941–1997)
- Call sign meaning: Canadian Broadcasting Corporation, Ville de Québec

Technical information
- Class: C1
- ERP: 25.7 kWs-vertical; 52.5 kWs-horizontal (peak)
- HAAT: 477.6 metres (1,567 ft)

Links
- Website: Ici Radio-Canada Première

CBV-FM is a Canadian radio station, which broadcasts the programming of Radio-Canada's Première network in Quebec City. The station broadcasts at 106.3 FM from Mount Bélair.

The station was first launched in 1934 as AM 950 CRCK, Quebec City's second-oldest radio station. It was an affiliate of the Canadian Radio Broadcasting Commission, airing programming in both English and French. It became a part of the Canadian Broadcasting Corporation in 1936. It adopted the callsign CBV in 1938, becoming the second station in Radio-Canada's French radio network. In 1941, CBV moved to 980 kHz.

In 1974, CBVX-FM, broadcasting Radio-Canada's FM network, was launched. It was initially known as CBV-FM.

On July 4, 1997, the CBC received CRTC approval to convert CBV to 106.3 FM. After the move to FM, the AM signal was discontinued. It took over the CBV-FM callsign, and the existing CBV-FM became CBVX-FM.

== Transmitters ==
Rebroadcasters of CBV-FM
City of licence	Identifier	Frequency	RECNet	CRTC Decision	Notes
Sainte-Anne-de-Beaupré	CBV-FM-1	96.7 FM	Query	99-80	46°57′28.08″N 70°58′22.08″W
Saint-Pamphile	CBV-FM-4	88.7 FM	Query	91-92	46°55′53.04″N 69°49′18.12″W
Saint-Fabien-de-Panet	CBV-FM-5	93.7 FM	Query		46°39′23.04″N 70°8′48.84″W
La Malbaie	CBV-FM-6	99.3 FM	Query		47°40′59.88″N 70°8′4.92″W
Saint-Georges	CBV-FM-7	96.7 FM	Query	2012-625	46°13′46.92″N 70°45′24.84″W
Thetford Mines	CBV-FM-8	90.1 FM	Query	85-523	46°6′47.16″N 71°24′30.96″W
Baie-Saint-Paul	CBV-FM-9	104.9 FM	Query	2014-501	47°25′26.04″N 70°31′28.92″W
