= CHOI-FM =

Radio station in Quebec City

Coordinates: 46°49′17″N 71°29′46″W

- Quebec City, Quebec; Canada
- Frequency: 98.1 MHz
- Branding: CHOI 98,1 Radio X

Programming
- Language: French
- Format: Talk

Ownership
- Owner: RNC Media

History
- First air date: November 1, 1949

Technical information
- Class: C1
- ERP: 40 kWs
- HAAT: 429 metres (1,407 ft)

Links
- Website: radiox.com

CHOI-FM is a French-language FM radio station that broadcasts on the frequency 98.1 MHz out of Quebec City, Quebec, Canada, with a talk format. Locally, it is known as Radio X (a reference to "Generation X", as most of CHOI's listeners consider themselves). It has been owned by Genex Communications since July 1996. The Bureau of Broadcast Measurement ratings released in December 2004 revealed that CHOI was the most popular radio station in the city with 443,100 listeners, up from 380,500 earlier in the year. The station is well known for airing controversial ideas and populist opinions. The station targets various groups, notably feminists and gay activists, as well as prominent politicians, and receives criticism from these groups for their controversial political statements.

Following a ruling by the CRTC, the station's licence lapsed, with its renewal application denied, in 2004 for failing "to comply with the Radio Regulations 1986 (the Regulations) as well as CHOI's Code of Ethics, adherence to which is required by one of its conditions of licence". Pending a court challenge, the station was permitted to stay on-air without a licence.

On May 8, 2006, Genex announced it would sell the station to RNC Media. The transaction – strictly speaking, the issuing of a new licence to RNC Media on the same frequency rather than a simple transfer of ownership – was approved by the CRTC on October 20, 2006.

== Main hosts of the station ==
Jeff Fillion was the most popular host at the station. He was the morning man, hosting with his staff Le monde parallèle de Jeff (Fillion's Parallel World) every weekday morning. Over the years, his ideas and opinions made him the city's most controversial radio host. He teamed up for a time with longtime morning man André Arthur. Fillion was sued numerous times by many well-known people around the province because of his controversial comments. The station's problems with the CRTC are mostly attributed to him and his comments.

In the past, he was well known for his show's contests. For example, he created a contest in the late 1990s where a woman would win a breast implants surgery on Good Friday - "Good Friday" being "Vendredi saint" in French, and the words "saint" and "sein" (breast) have the same pronunciation.

On the air, on the morning of March 17, 2005, Fillion announced that he was immediately resigning as host of the morning show. In May 2005, the former host started giving interviews to various Quebec media where he complained about what he says is a lack of respect towards him by the station's owners. He says that they have not offered him any severance pay since he left the air. The owners replied that they have offered him various jobs inside their company but he has refused all of them. The station also claimed that Fillion's demands for almost $2 million in severance pay were unreasonable. He is apparently also asking to be cleared of all responsibility in current or future lawsuits against him or the station. This would bring the total to $5 million.

Gilles Parent was hired by the station in 2001. He came from CHIK-FM, CHOI's rival station, to host the Le retour de Gilles Parent every weekday afternoon. His thoughts and opinions are less controversial and are expressed in a much more respectful manner than Fillion's.

Denis Gravel (known as "The fucking news guy", name given by Korn's former guitar player) hosted Le Char de hits until 2004, when it became the most popular radio program of the area at lunch time. He also did the news segments during Fillion's morning show. When Fillion resigned, Gravel replaced him as the host of the morning show. On March 16, 2004, he became well known in the province for inadvertently revealing the name of one of the victims of a highly publicized child prostitution case during Parent's afternoon show, while performing a live commentary after a day in court, where popular radioman Robert Gillet of competitor station CJMF-FM had stood in the accused box.

== Dispute with the CRTC ==
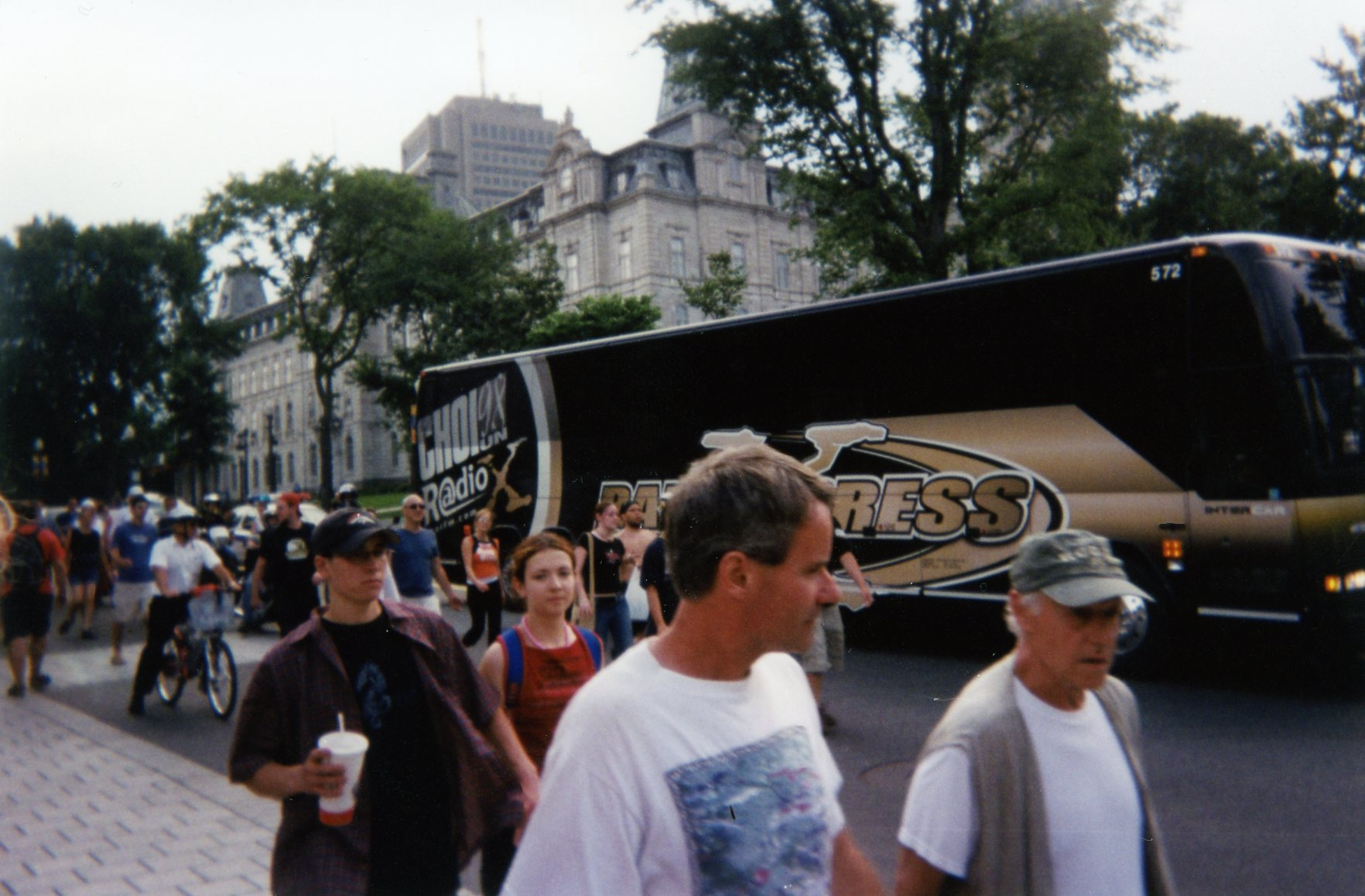
Demonstration at the Quebec Parliament Building on July 22, 2004

On July 13, 2004, the Canadian Radio-television and Telecommunications Commission ruled that the radio station would be shut down because it kept airing offensive and insulting remarks even after being put on probation in 2002. This meant that the station would be forced to stop transmitting on the night of August 31, 2004, when its licence expired. This prompted a huge march in the streets of Quebec City on July 22 when 50,000 people walked through the streets of the city to support the station, claiming the right of freedom of speech and opinion. It was the largest march in the capital city of Quebec since the 1960s.

On August 10, 2004, the station staged a protest against the CRTC's decision on Parliament Hill in Ottawa where 5,000 Quebec fans of the station went to the country's capital to demonstrate their support for the station. CHOI aired their regular afternoon show live from Ottawa.

On August 11, 2004, the station filed an appeal in federal court to extend its licence and to reverse the CRTC's decision.

On August 25, 2004, the CRTC and the federal government did not object to the station's request to continue its normal operations during the court proceedings. This meant that even though the station's licence expired on August 31, 2004, it was permitted to continue transmitting after that date and as long as the court procedures are in progress.

On May 24, 2005, the court started to hear the case. For four days, the station's lawyers pleaded to the three judges of the court that the CRTC overstepped its authority in ordering the shutdown of the station. They claimed that it should not be possible for the CRTC to shut down a station based only on the contents of the station's shows. The lawyers also pleaded that the CRTC could have used more moderate methods to punish the station, such as imposing a fine. Both the station and the CRTC have said that should they lose, they will appeal the decision to the Supreme Court of Canada.

On September 1, 2005, the court ruled against the station, stating in its decision that "freedom of expression, freedom of opinion and freedom of speech do not mean freedom of defamation, freedom of oppression and freedom of opprobrium." This meant that the station would be required shut down within 20 days unless it tried to contest the decision in the Supreme Court. On June 14, 2007, the Supreme Court refused to hear the case. Had the sale to RNC Media not gone through, the decision would have effectively forced CHOI-FM to stop broadcasting at 23:59 the same day. However, RNC Media had already received CRTC approval for its "new" licence for 98.1, making the court decision moot.

The dispute has also had major political implications, as it was the primary reason that Sylvain Légaré was elected in Vanier in a by-election in 2004 for the ADQ. In addition, radio personality André Arthur was elected as an independent in the 2006 federal election in Portneuf—Jacques-Cartier, and most of the other seats in the area went to the Conservative Party of Canada, which had previously been extremely weak in Quebec.

== Later history ==
After RNC Media acquired the station, CHOI shifted to alternative rock, becoming the first French-language alternative rock station in Canada, but continued to report as an active rock station on Mediabase. As of 2010, the station was delisted from Mediabase, and moved to its current talk radio format.

Previous logo

On August 28, 2018, RNC Media announced the sale of CHOI to Leclerc Communication (owner of CJEC-FM and CFEL-FM) for an undisclosed sum, later revealed to be $19 million. As it owns the maximum number of French-language stations it can own on the FM band in Quebec City, the company would have had to divest a station or seek an exemption. The CRTC approved the deal, under the condition that Leclerc divest one of its stations in Quebec City. However, as Leclerc refused to agree to this condition, the company called off the purchase.
