= CFAP-DT =

Television station in Quebec City

Quebec City, Quebec; Canada
- Channels: Digital: 35 (UHF); Virtual: 2
- Branding: Noovo

Programming
- Affiliations: Noovo

Ownership
- Owner: Bell Media; (Groupe V Média inc.)
- Sister stations: CHIK-FM, CITF-FM

History
- First air date: September 7, 1986
- Former channel numbers: Analog: 2 (VHF, 1986–2011); Digital: 39 (UHF, until 2021)
- Call sign meaning: CF Adélard Pouliot

Technical information
- Licensing authority: CRTC
- ERP: 20.1 kW
- HAAT: 172.9 m (567 ft)
- Transmitter coordinates: 46°48′27″N 71°13′0.12″W

Links
- Website: Noovo

CFAP-DT (channel 2) is a television station in Quebec City, Quebec, Canada, airing programming from the French-language network Noovo. Owned and operated by Bell Media, the station maintains studios on the corner of Rue d'Youville and Rue Saint-Joachim (co-located with sister stations CHIK-FM and CITF-FM) in the Quebec City borough of La Cité-Limoilou, and its transmitter is located at Édifice Marie-Guyart, in downtown Quebec City.

== History ==
The station signed on along with sister station CFJP-TV in Montreal in 1986 as part of what was then the TQS network. It was owned by the family of Jean Pouliot, then-owner of CFCF-TV. The A in the callsign stands for Adélard, Pouliot's middle name.

Originally a full satellite of CFJP, it began airing its own programming on September 3, 1989. However, like all other TQS/V/Noovo stations, it was (and still is) largely a semi-satellite of CFJP. As an owned-and-operated station of the network, CFAP was part of the takeover of TQS by Remstar Corporation.

== Digital television ==
CFAP-DT ceased broadcasting in analog on August 17, 2011, and signed on to digital on August 27, 2011, on UHF channel 39, using virtual channel 2.
