= CFEM-DT =

Television station in Quebec, Canada

- Rouyn-Noranda, Quebec; Canada
- Channels: Digital: 13 (VHF); Virtual: 13
- Branding: TVA Abitibi-Témiscamingue (general); TVA Nouvelles (newscasts)

Programming
- Affiliations: TVA

Ownership
- Owner: RNC MEDIA Inc.
- Sister stations: CFVS-DT

History
- First air date: 1979
- Former call signs: CFEM-TV (1979–2011)
- Former channel numbers: Analog: 13 (VHF, 1979–2011)

Technical information
- Licensing authority: CRTC
- ERP: CFEM-DT: 22 kW; CFEM-DT-1: 22 kW
- HAAT: CFEM-DT: 219.6 m (720 ft); CFEM-DT-1: 201.1 m (660 ft)
- Transmitter coordinates: CFEM-DT: 48°15′52″N 79°2′38″W; CFEM-DT-1: 48°25′17″N 77°50′49″W
- Translator(s): CFEM-DT-1 10 Val-d'Or

Links
- Website: TVA Abitibi-Témiscamingue

CFEM-DT (channel 13), branded as TVA Abitibi-Témiscamingue, is a television station licensed to Rouyn-Noranda, Quebec, Canada, serving the Abitibi-Témiscamingue region as an affiliate of the French-language network TVA. It is owned by RNC Media alongside Noovo affiliate CFVS-DT (channel 25), licensed to the neighbouring city of Val-d'Or. The two stations share studios on Avenue Murdoch and Avenue de la Saint Anne in Rouyn-Noranda; CFEM-DT's transmitter is located near Chemin Powell (north of Route 101). The station operates a rebroadcaster in Val-d'Or (CFEM-DT-1) on VHF channel 10. Both transmitters flash-cut to digital on September 1, 2011.

CFEM is the youngest of the TVA network affiliates, in terms of the year of sign-on, having launched in 1979.

== Subchannel ==
Subchannel of CFEM-DT
Subchannel	Res.	Short name	Programming
13.1	1080i	CFEM-DT	TVA
