= Qub Radio =

Canadian French-language radio station

- Montreal, Quebec; Canada
- Broadcast area: Worldwide, primarily targeting Quebec
- Frequency: Internet radio

Programming
- Language: French
- Format: Talk radio

Ownership
- Owner: Quebecor Media
- Sister stations: TVA; LCN

History
- First air date: October 4, 2018

Technical information
- Repeater: CJPX-FM 99.5 Montreal (workweek daytime only)

Links
- Website: https://www.qub.ca/radio

Qub
- Country: Canada
- Broadcast area: Nationwide
- Headquarters: Montreal, Quebec

Programming
- Language: French
- Picture format: 1080i HDTV

Ownership
- Owner: Groupe TVA Inc.
- Parent: Quebecor Media

History
- Launched: January 11, 2024
- Replaced: Yoopa

Links
- Website: https://www.tvaplus.ca/qub

Qub Radio (Note: “Qub” (pronounced like “cube” in French) is not an acronym, but is usually stylized by Quebecor in all-caps as QUB in plain text, and in all-lowercase as qub in the channel’s logotype) is a Canadian French-language internet talk radio station operated by Quebecor subsidiary Groupe TVA, primarily from studios in Montreal, which launched on October 4, 2018. Qub, a discretionary television channel serving as an audiovisual simulcast of the radio service, launched on January 11, 2024 on Quebecor-owned Vidéotron and certain other providers, repurposing the channel licence previously used by Yoopa.

Qub features opinion-driven programming, with many of its personalities shared with other Quebecor properties including Le Canal Nouvelles and newspapers including Le Journal de Montréal.

Quebecor launched an Internet radio station, in part, because it is not permitted to operate any terrestrial radio stations in the Montreal and Quebec City markets under CRTC rules, due to its pre-existing ownership of daily newspapers and broadcast TV stations (associated with its TVA network) in both markets. On August 12, 2024, Leclerc Communication announced its Montreal terrestrial radio station CJPX-FM (99.5 MHz) would simulcast Qub Radio from 6:00 a.m. to 6:00 p.m. each weekday starting August 26.

The "Qub" name is also used by several other Quebecor digital properties, including its consolidated digital content platform which launched on September 16, 2021.
