= CFIX (AM) =

French radio station in Ontario, Canada

- Cornwall, Ontario; Canada
- Frequency: 1170 kHz

Programming
- Language: French
- Format: Adult contemporary

Ownership
- Owner: CFML (Cornwall) Ltd.; Les Communications Franco Ltée.
- Sister stations: CHPR

History
- Founded: 1959
- First air date: November 11, 1959
- Last air date: December 1983; (24 years, 20 days)
- Former call signs: CFML (1959–1977, 1983)
- Former frequencies: 1110 kHz

Technical information
- Licensing authority: CRTC
- Power: 10,000 watts (days only)
- Transmitter coordinates: 45.0041°N 74.3656°W

CFIX is a former radio station licensed to operate in Cornwall, Ontario, to serve its francophone community. The AM station first took to the air on November 11, 1959, as CFML at 1110 kHz with an effective radiated power of 1,000 watts. The call letters for CFML depicted its founder and owner Madeleine Laframboise (ML).

== History ==
CFML was expected to launch on November 9, 1959, but was pushed back to November 11, for unknown reasons.

In 1965, Madeleine Laframboise received authorization to sell the radio station to Bernard Bertrand, who also managed Cornwall Cable Vision (1961) Limited.

In 1971, CFML (Cornwall) Ltd. received approval from the CRTC to change its frequency to 1170 kHz and to increase its power output to 10,000 watts. It would link its studios located at 1308 PItt Street in Cornwall, to its transmitter site using a studio transmitter link (STL) located on top of the local Hotel Dieu Hospital. The transmitter site, was on the remote Yellow Island situated in the middle of the St. Lawrence River near Saint Regis, Quebec. It used a dual antenna array to control the direction of its AM signal within Eastern Ontario and Western Quebec. It was licensed to operate as a daytimer radio station.

In 1975, the owners were denied an application to operate another 1,000 watt French language radio station in Hawkesbury, Ontario. In its decision, the CRTC stated that it would be willing to consider an application for a low powered repeater station to provide better coverage for the Cornwall station, which went on air in May 1976 when it began operating CHPR on its old 1110 kHz frequency using 250 watts.

In 1976, the owners, Bernard Bertrand, Extell Bertrand, and Bertrand Investments Ltd. sold all of their shares in CFML (Cornwall) Ltd. to Pierre A. Belleau who would later change the call letters CFML to CFIX, and as a condition of transferring the broadcast license, would receive approval to allow CHPR to periodically broadcast local programming from its Cornwall studios.

In 1981, the Commission approved an application to transfer ownership of CFIX and CHPR to Robert Chevrier (37.5%) and Jean Soucy (37.5%) of Quebec, and Pierre A. Belleau who would retain a 25% stake. The new owners Les Communications Franco Ltée. intended to re-apply for a 24-hour operation, which was approved in 1980 but was allowed to lapse. A year later, the new owners were in financial trouble and the licenses for CFIX and CHPR were renewed by the CRTC until March 31, 1982, to allow time to find a new buyer. The commission was informed on August 21, 1981, that Les Communications Franco Ltée. went into receivership. On August 28, 1981, the trustee Price Waterhouse Ltd. was authorized to operate the stations.

After Price Waterhouse Ltd. found a new buyer, the CRTC refused to transfer the broadcast license issued to Les Communications Franco Ltée. to Idea Akashwani Communications Ltd. of Toronto on June 30, 1982, for not allocating the required funds for a viable operation, and for proposing insufficient staff and over optimistic revenues. On June 30, 1982, Radio Cornwall-Hawkesbury Inc, owned by Guy Vaillancourt who also operated CJLA-AM in Lachute Quebec, was authorized to purchase CFIX and CHPR from Price Waterhouse Ltd. Two FM rebroadcast 50 watt transmitters to simulcast CFIX at 92.1 MHz in Cornwall, and CHPR at 102.1 MHz in Hawkesbury 24 hours a day were also approved, while leaving the AM stations to continue operating as daytimers for a two-year period, enabling it to consolidate its operations.

CFIX went silent in December 1983 due to technical and financial problems, without giving a notice and permission to the CRTC. The station reverted its call letters to CFML (a station currently uses the CFML callsign) without any approval. Its owner kept the Hawkesbury repeater in service, changing its programming source to CJLA in Lachute, Quebec and later adding some local programming.
