= CJEC-FM =

Radio station in Quebec City

Coordinates: 46°49′22″N 71°29′41″W

- Quebec City, Quebec; Canada
- Frequency: 91.9 MHz
- Branding: WKND 91.9 (Weekend Radio 91.9)

Programming
- Language: French
- Format: Modern adult contemporary

Ownership
- Owner: Leclerc Communication
- Sister stations: CFEL-FM

History
- First air date: August 2003

Technical information
- Class: C1
- ERP: 13,910 watts average 31,000 watts peak
- HAAT: 466.7 meters (1,531 ft)
- Repeater: 99.5 CJPX-HD2 (Montreal)

Links
- Website: wknd.fm

CJEC-FM (91.9 MHz) is a French-language Canadian radio station located in Quebec City, Quebec.

Owned and operated by Leclerc Communication, it broadcasts on 91.9 MHz using a directional antenna with an average effective radiated power of 13,910 watts and a peak effective radiated power of 31,000 watts (class C1). The station's transmitter is located at Mount Bélair. The station was licensed by the CRTC in 2002.

logo for CJEC-FM as a Rythme FM station, 2009-2012.

The station has a modern adult contemporary format. Until May 2012, it was also a part of Cogeco's adult contemporary Rythme FM network of stations across much of Quebec.

On April 30, 2010, then-owner Cogeco announced it would purchase Corus Quebec's radio stations. The sale was approved by the CRTC on December 17, 2010, on the condition that CJEC-FM be sold to another party by December 2011.

On November 9, 2011, Cogeco announced a deal to sell CFEL-FM and CJEC-FM to Leclerc Communication Inc., a broadcaster owned by Jacques Leclerc, a local businessman who owns Laura Secord Chocolates and Biscuits Leclerc. The sale was approved by the CRTC on January 19 and completed on January 31, 2012. The stations were delisted from Cogeco Diffusion's website shortly thereafter. For a time CJEC's website still identified the station as a Cogeco station, which was no longer true; also, the station retained the Rythme FM name and simulcasted most of its networked Rythme FM programming from former sister station CFGL-FM in Montreal. However, on May 21, 2012 at 12 Midnight, Leclerc dropped the Rythme FM branding and adult contemporary programming from CJEC-FM, and began to identify itself as Le 91,9 FM Québec, playing a selection of hot adult contemporary music without use of personalities—the station was relaunched as WKND 91.9 (pronounced on-air as Weekend Radio 91.9) on June 20, 2012, at 6PM. The station has moved away from adult contemporary programming and shifted to modern adult contemporary by adding some alternative rock artists to the playlist.

In April 2020, Leclerc acquired Montreal classical station CJPX-FM, which previously simulcasted CJEC-FM's competitor, CJSQ-FM; in June of that year, that station would flip to an adult contemporary format as WKND 99.5, breaking off the simulcast with CJSQ-FM.

The Rhythme FM branding and format would resurface on August 16, 2021, after Cogeco-owned CFOM-FM changed its branding from "M 102.9".
