= CJGO-FM =

Radio station in La Sarre and Rouyn-Noranda, Quebec

Coordinates: 48°49′45″N 79°12′04″W

- La Sarre–Rouyn-Noranda, Quebec; Canada
- Broadcast area: Abitibi-Témiscamingue
- Frequency: 102.1 MHz
- Branding: O 104,3-102,1-95,7

Programming
- Language: French
- Format: Classic rock

Ownership
- Owner: Arsenal Media
- Sister stations: CHGO-FM CHOA-FM

History
- First air date: 1950
- Former call signs: CHLS (1950–1997); CHLS-FM (1997–1999); CHGO-FM-2 (1999-?)
- Former frequencies: 1240 kHz (1950–1997)

Technical information
- Class: La Sarre: A; Rouyn-Noranda: C
- ERP: La Sarre: 4.13 kW; Rouyn-Noranda: 26.1 kW average, 44 kW peak
- HAAT: 89 metres (292 ft) (La Sarre); 204.2 metres (670 ft) (Rouyn-Noranda)
- Translators: CJGO-FM-1 95.7 MHz, Rouyn-Noranda

Links
- Website: oabitibi.ca

CJGO-FM is a Canadian radio station, which broadcasts at 102.1 FM in La Sarre, Quebec. Owned and operated by Arsenal Media, the station airs a Classic rock format branded as O 104,3-102,1-95,7.

CJGO also has a rebroadcaster in Rouyn-Noranda, CHGO-FM-1, 95.7 FM; the repeater originally rebroadcast sister station CHGO-FM in Val-d'Or until August 2010, when it switched to CJGO. Although the station is licensed to La Sarre and the transmitter in Rouyn-Noranda is legally a rebroadcaster, the station's actual studios are located in Rouyn-Noranda.

The station was originally an AM station, CKLS, converting to 102.1 FM in 1997.

CJGO-FM's former Capitale Rock logo; used from 2011 to 2019
