= CBVT-DT =

Television station in Quebec City

- Quebec City, Quebec; Canada
- Channels: Digital: 25 (UHF); Virtual: 11
- Branding: ICI Québec

Programming
- Affiliations: 11.1: Ici Radio-Canada Télé

Ownership
- Owner: Société Radio-Canada

History
- First air date: September 3, 1964
- Former channel numbers: Analog: 11 (VHF, 1964–2011); Digital 12 (VHF, until 2011)
- Call sign meaning: CBC Ville de Québec Télévision

Technical information
- Licensing authority: CRTC
- ERP: 2.45 kW
- HAAT: 500.1 m (1,641 ft)
- Transmitter coordinates: 46°49′21″N 71°29′43″W

Links
- Website: ICI Québec

CBVT-DT (channel 11), branded as ICI Québec, is an Ici Radio-Canada Télé station in Quebec City, Quebec, Canada. The station is owned by the Canadian Broadcasting Corporation (known in French as Société Radio-Canada). CBVT-DT's studios are located on Rue Saint-Jean and Aut Dufferin Montmorency in the Quebec City borough of La Cité-Limoilou, and its transmitter is located on Avenue de la Montagne/Dumont Belair Ouest in Val-Bélair.

== History ==
The station, built and signed on by Radio-Canada itself, first aired on September 3, 1964. Quebec City's previous Radio-Canada affiliate CFCM-TV became an independent station for a few years before becoming one of the co-founders of TVA in 1971.

The station moved into new studios in 2004, uniting all of CBC/Radio-Canada's staff in Quebec City.

== Programming ==
For the network, the station produces La semaine verte, an hour-long weekly newsmagazine about agriculture and rural life, and Second regard, a half-hour program exploring religion and spirituality.

For local programming, an evening newscast under the title Le Téléjournal/Québec, airs weekdays at 6 p.m.; a weekday noon newscast, Le Téléjournal midi/Québec et Est du Québec, is shared with Radio-Canada's group of stations in Eastern Quebec.

== Technical information ==
=== Subchannel ===
Subchannels of CBVT-DT
Subchannel	Res.	Short name	Programming
11.1	720p	CBVT-DT	Ici Radio-Canada Télé

After the analog-to-digital conversion which took place on August 31, 2011, CBVT-DT stayed at its pre-transition position on channel 12, allowing CBVE-TV, a repeater of CBMT-DT Montreal, to move from channel 5 to channel 11. Because of potential interference from CFCF-DT in Montreal (which moved its digital signal to channel 12 on the transition date) and reception problems, CBVT-DT moved to channel 25 in December 2011. Channel 25 was previously used by CIVQ-DT, a local digital repeater of Télé-Québec.

== Transmitters ==
CBVT had seven analog television rebroadcasters in the communities near Quebec City.

Due to federal funding reductions to the CBC, in April 2012, the CBC responded with substantial budget cuts, which included shutting down CBC's and Radio-Canada's remaining analog transmitters on July 31, 2012. None of CBC or Radio-Canada's television re-transmitters were converted to digital.

CBVT's main transmitter site for Quebec City is located at Mount Bélair.
