= CHGO-FM =

Radio station in Val-d'Or

Coordinates: 48°24′54″N 77°46′53″W

- Val-d'Or, Quebec; Canada
- Broadcast area: Abitibi-Témiscamingue
- Frequency: 104.3 MHz
- Branding: O 104,3-102,1-95,7

Programming
- Language: French
- Format: Classic rock

Ownership
- Owner: Arsenal Media
- Sister stations: CJGO-FM CHOA-FM

History
- First air date: 1939
- Former call signs: CKVD (1939–1999)
- Former frequencies: 900 MHz (AM) (1939–1999)

Technical information
- Class: C1
- ERP: 100,000 watts
- HAAT: 164.5 metres (540 ft)

Links
- Website: oabitibi.ca

CHGO-FM is a Canadian radio station, which broadcasts at 104.3 FM in Val-d'Or, Quebec. Owned and operated by Arsenal Media, the station airs a Classic rock format branded as O 104,3-102,1-95,7. It also shares much of its programming with CJGO-FM in La Sarre, although the two stations each produce their own separate morning programs.

The radio station originally began as CKVD 900, an AM station that was part of the Abitibi AM network since 1939 with CHAD Amos (now defunct) and CKRN Rouyn-Noranda (now CHOA-FM), until it was converted to FM in 1999.

CHGO-FM's former Capitale Rock logo; used from 2011 to 2019

CHGO also had a rebroadcaster in:

- Rouyn-Noranda, CJGO-FM-1 95.7
- La Sarre, CJGO-FM at 102.1. On August 6, 2010, the CRTC granted that repeater to switch to CJGO.
