= CFEL-FM =

Radio station in Lévis, Quebec

Coordinates: 46°48′27″N 71°13′00″W

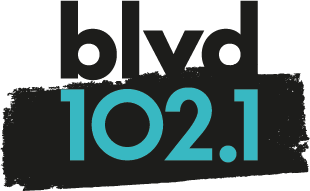

Lévis, Quebec; Canada
- Broadcast area: Greater Quebec City area
- Frequency: 102.1 MHz
- Branding: blvd 102.1

Programming
- Language: French
- Format: Alternative rock

Ownership
- Owner: Leclerc Communication Inc.
- Sister stations: CJEC-FM

History
- First air date: December 1986

Technical information
- Class: C1
- ERP: vertical polarization: 9.12 kilowatts average; 33.9 kilowatts peak; horizontal polarization: 6.24 kilowatts average; 20.2 kilowatts peak
- HAAT: 170 meters (560 ft)

Links
- Website: www.blvd.fm

CFEL-FM is a French-language Canadian radio station located in Quebec City, Quebec, but the station's official city of license is Lévis.

Owned and operated by Leclerc Communication Inc., it is a Class C1 FM station that broadcasts on 102.1 MHz using a directional antenna.

The station has an alternative rock format branded as blvd 102.1.

== History ==
Originally based in and licensed to Montmagny, CFEL-FM received its first licence in December 1986 and replaced CKBM 1490, an unrelated station that closed due to a bankruptcy in 1983.

On July 8, 2008, 591991 B.C. Ltd., a numbered company owned by Corus Entertainment, applied to move CFEL's transmitter from L'Ange-Gardien to a new site in Quebec City. The objective of moving the transmitter is to achieve better coverage of the Lévis and Quebec City market. On October 3, 2008, this request was granted. CFEL-FM became CKOI 102.1 Québec on November 6, 2009, as part of the short-lived CKOI network of stations, adopting the same logo and branding as its sister stations CKOI Montreal and CKOI Estrie.

On April 30, 2010, it was announced that Cogeco will acquire all radio stations owned by Corus in Quebec for $80 million. The sale was approved by the CRTC on December 17, 2010, on the condition that CFEL-FM be resold to another party by December 2011.

CFEL-FM's logo as CKOI 102.1, used from 2012 to 2015.

On November 9, 2011, Cogeco announced a deal to sell CFEL-FM and CJEC-FM to Leclerc Communication Inc., a broadcaster owned by Jacques Leclerc, a local businessman who owns Laura Secord Chocolates and Biscuits Leclerc. The sale was approved by the CRTC on January 19 and completed on January 31, 2012. The stations were delisted from Cogeco Diffusion's website shortly thereafter. Following its transfer to Leclerc, the station switched to an all-locally originated schedule and imaging, but retaining the CKOI branding and Corus-era logo. The station formerly used the "La radio des hits" slogan used by Astral Media's NRJ network, even though that slogan was changed after NRJ's change.

CFEL-FM's former BLVD 102.1, used from 2015 to 2018.

In the fall of 2012, CFEL-FM adopted the same current branding and slogan as CKOI-FM, also under license from Cogeco. This arrangement would continue until September 2, 2015, when the station was rebranded as blvd 102.1. The station's format changed from Top 40 to Adult Top 40 and now offers an all talk morning show with Stéphane Gasse.
