= RNC Media =

Canadian broadcasting group

- Type: Private company
- Industry: Media
- Founded: 1948
- Headquarters: Westmount, Quebec
- Key people: Pierre R. Brosseau, Chairman & CEO
- Products: Broadcasting
- Owner: Gourd Family, Pierre R. Brosseau
- Website: RNC Media

RNC Media (formerly Radio-Nord Communications) is a Canadian broadcasting group based in Westmount, Quebec, with offices in Gatineau and Rouyn-Noranda. The company operates five television stations and several radio stations, mostly in Quebec.

The company was founded in 1948 when brothers Jean-Joffre and David Armand Gourd, along with business partner Roger Charbonneau, acquired radio stations CKRN Rouyn (now CHOA-FM), CHAD Amos (defunct) and CKVD Val-d'Or (now CHGO-FM) from Canadian media mogul Roy Thomson.

== Television ==
Radio-Nord Communications logo

=== Terrestrial ===
- Gatineau/Ottawa - CHOT-DT (TVA), CFGS-DT (Noovo)
- Rouyn-Noranda - CFEM-DT (TVA)
- Val-d'Or/Rouyn-Noranda - CFVS-DT (Noovo)

== Radio ==
The primary brands associated with the company are Radio X, and Rythme FM. BPM Sports outlets in Gatineau and Quebec City carry music programming during evening hours, due to CRTC-imposed programming restrictions.

- Gatineau: CHLX-FM (Rythme FM)
- Quebec City: CHOI-FM (Radio X)

=== Former Stations ===
- Gatineau: CFTX-FM
- Montreal: CKLX-FM
- Quebec City: CHXX-FM
