= Mount Bélair =

Mountain in Quebec, Canada

- Mont Bélair
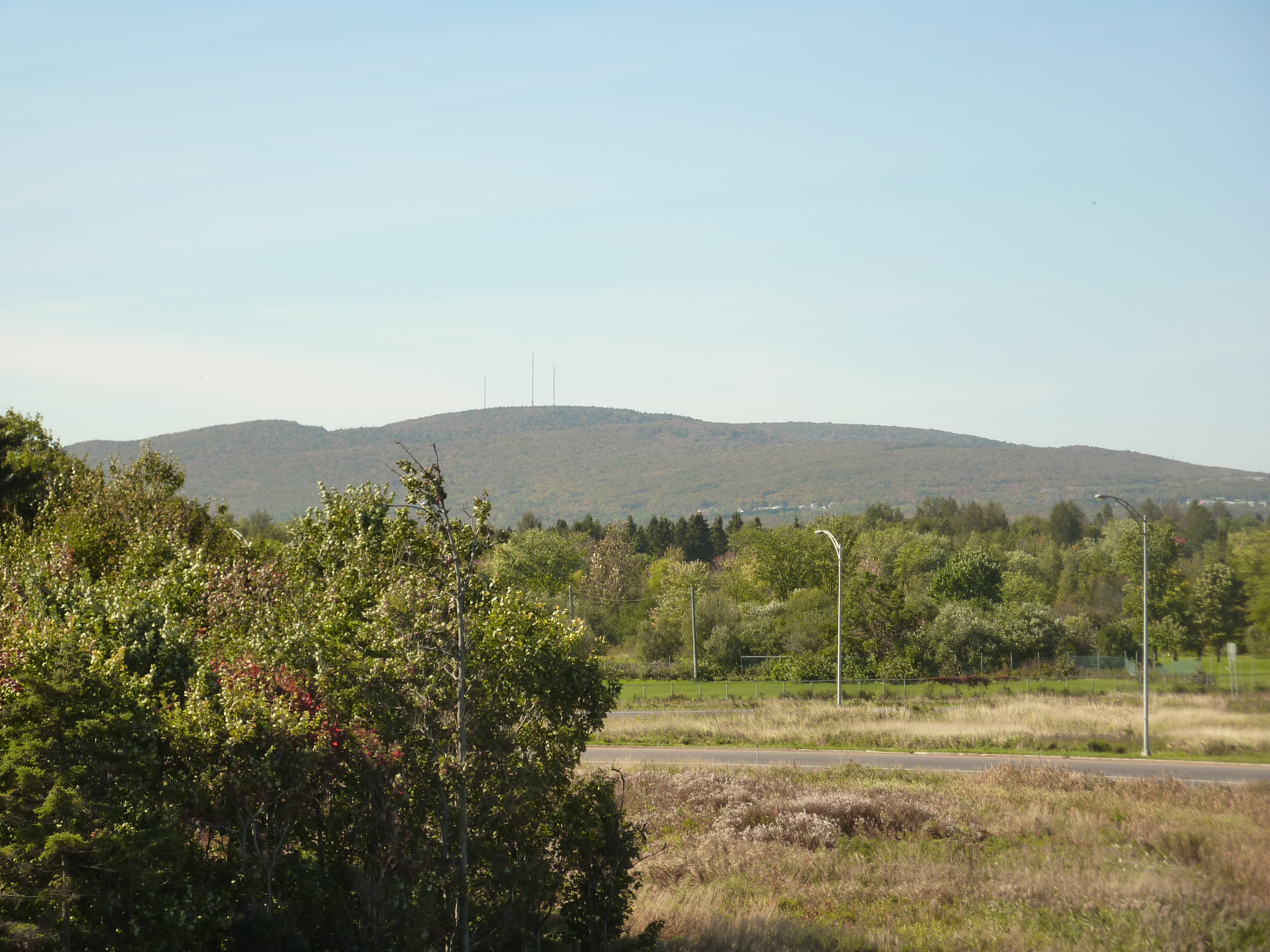
- View of Mount Bélair from the intersection of Chauveau Avenue and Autoroute Henri-IV.

Highest point
- Elevation: 485 m (1,591 ft)
- Listing: List of mountains in Canada
- Coordinates: 46°49′23″N 71°29′38″W

Geography
- Location within Quebec
- Location: Quebec, Canada
- Parent range: Laurentian Mountains

Mount Bélair is a peak in the Laurentian Mountains, Quebec, Canada, with an altitude of 485 m (1,591 ft). It is located in the Val-Bélair section of Quebec City, approximately 24 km (15 mi) west of downtown.

== Activities ==
Mount Bélair is a popular site for outdoor activities. Year round, the summit offers a panoramic view from which one can see downtown Québec, and portions of the trail employ raised wooden walkways. In the autumn, it is decorated with the ornate colors of the boreal forest. In winter, available activities include cross-country skiing, snowshoeing, and walking. During warmer temperatures, one may take advantage of a pool, volleyball and soccer nets, a playground, hiking trails, and campground.

In 2001 a telescope was placed in the park, making it the first and only observatory in Québec City, and club members periodically hold observation nights open to the public (weather permitting).

== Telecommunications ==
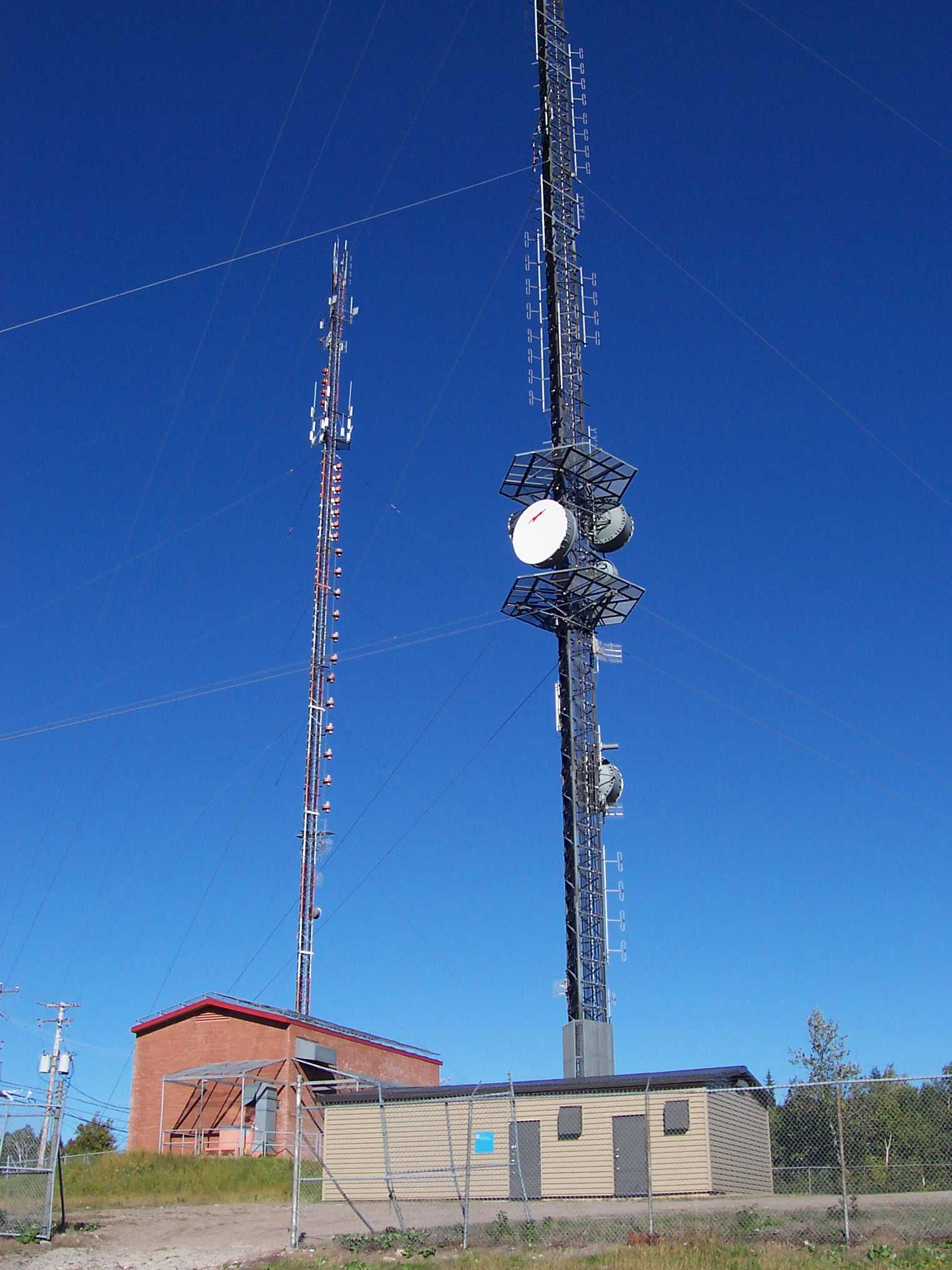
Communication towers and transmitters atop Mount Bélair.

The mountain is also used as a transmission site for many of Quebec City's radio stations, as well as for television stations CBVT-DT and CKMI-DT. It is also used as an easement for Hydro-Québec's transmission lines. The Canadian Coast Guard uses the site for VHF Marine communications along the St Lawrence River.
