= CBVE-FM =

CBC Radio One station in Quebec City, Canada

- Quebec City, Quebec; Canada
- Broadcast area: Quebec, except Montreal and Outaouais
- Frequency: 104.7 MHz (FM)
- Branding: CBC Radio One

Programming
- Format: News/talk

Ownership
- Owner: Canadian Broadcasting Corporation
- Sister stations: CBV-FM, CBVX-FM, CBVT-DT

History
- First air date: March 1976 (as a CBM repeater); August 1, 1994 (as a separate station)
- Call sign meaning: Canadian Broadcasting Corporation Ville de Québec English

Technical information
- Class: C1
- ERP: 24,900 watts average; 65,800 watts peak
- HAAT: 477.6 metres (1,567 ft)

CBVE-FM is a Canadian radio station, which broadcasts the programming of the CBC Radio One network at 104.7 FM in Quebec City, Quebec. The station's main transmitter is located at Mount Bélair. Its studios are co-located with its francophone sister stations on Rue St-Jean in Downtown Quebec City.

CBVE is the originating station for all CBC Radio One transmitters in Quebec outside Montreal and the Outaouais. Together, they are known as the Quebec Community Network, with a special mandate to provide service to the province's anglophone minority.

Although it is a semi-satellite of CBME-FM in Montreal, most of the station's operations are in Quebec City except for master control, which is based at the Canadian Broadcasting Centre in Toronto.

== History ==
The station was launched in 1976. Prior to its launch, CBC Radio programming was aired on private affiliate CFOM. Following CFOM's shutdown as a commercial station in late 1975, the CBC directly acquired the station and kept it in operation until the FM signal was launched.

The station was originally a rebroadcaster of CBM in Montreal (now CBME-FM). In 1994, however, it was granted a separate licence. At the same time, all but one of CBM's rebroadcasters were transferred to CBVE.

The call sign CBME was formerly used for a low-power AM repeater in La Tuque which changed to CBVE-1.

== Local programming ==
CBVE-FM's local programs are Quebec AM, hosted by Susan Campbell, in the mornings and Breakaway, hosted by Jacquie Czernin, in the afternoons. The rest of the station's schedule is a simulcast of CBME-FM.

An hour of Quebec AM is also heard on CBC North radio stations in the Nunavik region of northern Quebec.

== Transmitters ==
Rebroadcasters of CBVE-FM
City of licence	Identifier	Frequency	Power	Class	RECNet	CRTC Decision	Notes
Baie-Comeau	CBMI-FM	93.7 FM	3,000 watts	A	Query		49°13′59.16″N 68°8′29.04″W
Blanc-Sablon	CBMS-FM	102.7 FM	351 watts	A	Query		51°25′3″N 57°6′6.12″W
Chandler	CBVB-FM	103.7 FM	222 watts	A1	Query		48°18′15.12″N 64°41′52.08″W
Chibougamau	CBVC-FM	90.3 FM	29,939 watts	B	Query		49°52′28.92″N 74°22′58.08″W
Escuminac	CBVA-FM	98.1 FM	827 watts	A	Query		48°3′19.08″N 66°27′11.16″W
Fermont	CBMR-FM	105.1 FM	16 watts	A1	Query		52°49′13.08″N 67°5′27.96″W
Gaspé	CBVG-FM	88.5 FM^{2}	2,610 watts	B	Query		48°50′0.96″N 64°15′24.12″W
Harrington Harbour	CBMU-FM	99.5 FM	169 watts	A1	Query		50°30′2.16″N 59°29′13.92″W
Les Îles-de-la-Madeleine	CBVM-FM	95.3 FM	4,200 watts	B	Query		47°23′3.84″N 61°55′0.84″W
Murdochville	CBMJ-FM	99.5 FM	98 watts	A	Query	2013-226	48°57′56.16″N 65°28′40.08″W
New Carlisle	CBVN-FM	101.5 FM	800 watts	A	Query		48°0′32.04″N 65°19′30″W
New Richmond	CBVR-FM	103.5 FM	1,000 watts	A	Query		48°8′51″N 65°47′39.84″W
Vieux-Fort	CBMV-FM	95.9 FM	67 watts	A1	Query		51°25′36.12″N 57°50′3.84″W
Percé	CBVP-FM	105.3 FM	840 watts	B	Query		48°31′36.84″N 64°14′35.88″W
Port-Daniel–Gascons	CBVF-FM	100.5 FM	234 watts	A1	Query		48°8′21.12″N 64°59′7.08″W
Rivière-Saint-Paul	CBMY-FM	104.3 FM	54 watts	A1	Query		51°28′45.12″N 57°42′56.16″W
Rouyn-Noranda	CBMA-FM	91.9 FM	2,712 watts	A	Query		48°15′55.08″N 79°1′59.88″W
Saguenay	CBJE-FM	102.7 FM	30,000 watts	B	Query	98-53	48°25′28.92″N 71°6′29.88″W
Saint-Augustin	CBMX-FM	102.3 FM	56 watts	A1	Query		51°14′12.12″N 58°38′26.16″W
Mont-Tremblant	CBMF-FM	98.1 FM	845 watts	A	Query		46°7′23.16″N 74°38′18.96″W
Schefferville	CBMH-FM	103.1 FM	400 watts	A	Query	94-165	54°48′0″N 66°51′6.84″W
Sept-Îles	CBSE-FM	96.9 FM	15,000 watts	B	Query		50°8′56.04″N 66°28′9.12″W
Sherbrooke	CBMB-FM	91.7 FM	25,000 watts	B	Query		45°23′51″N 71°50′16.08″W
Gros-Mécatina	CBMT-FM	101.5 FM	178 watts	A	Query		50°47′13.92″N 59°0′29.88″W
Thetford Mines	CBMC-FM	92.3 FM	250 watts	A	Query		46°6′47.16″N 71°24′30.96″W
Trois-Rivières	CBMZ-FM	93.9 FM	14,000 watts	B	Query		46°30′10.08″N 72°38′12.84″W
Val-d'Or/Amos	CBMN-FM	101.1 FM	50,000 watts	B	Query		48°12′1.08″N 78°7′14.88″W
La Tuque	CBVE-1-FM	101.9 FM	265 watts		Query	2016-227	47°25′24.96″N 72°45′47.16″W
Lebel-sur-Quévillon	CBMK-FM	92.7 FM	50 watts	LP	Query	2017-267	49°2′57.84″N 76°58′46.92″W
Senneterre	CBMM-FM	101.7 FM	115 watts	A1	Query		48°22′32.88″N 77°13′9.12″W

On February 18, 1998, the CRTC approved the CBC's application to change the frequency for CBJE-FM Chicoutimi/Saguenay's frequency from 107.9 MHz to 102.7 MHz by decreasing the effective radiated power from 50,000 watts to 30,000 watts.

On September 11, 2008, the CRTC approved the CBC's application to operate a temporary low-power FM mono transmitter at Lac-Mégantic. It would broadcast on 104.1 MHz with an effective radiated power of 50 watts for a period of three months. The CBC indicated the transmitter would rebroadcast CBVE and ensure the continuity of the national Radio One service to Lac-Megantic while the municipality conducts renovations on the site of the low-power AM transmitter CBMO, which was currently unserviceable. It is unknown if the transmitter(s) is currently operating as CBMO and CBMO-FM is not listed in the Industry Canada database.

On January 4, 2013, the CBC filed and application to the CRTC to convert CBMJ 750 to 99.5 FM. The application was approved on May 8, 2013.

On October 25, 2013, the CRTC approved the CBC's application to decrease the power of CBVG from 2,160 to 1,730 watts (decreasing the maximum ERP from 4,250 to 2,610 watts and its EHAAT from 409.5 to 384.5 metres).

On March 19, 2015, the CBC submitted an application to add an FM transmitter in Malartic, CBMN-FM, which would broadcast at 101.1 MHz at 26,480 watts with a maximum ERP of 50,000 watts. In the CRTC's July 3, 2015 release, CBMN's ERP reads 22,800 watts. CBMN would replace two low-powered CBC AM transmitters, CBMN 1230 and CBML 570 Val-d'Or. The new transmitter may also replace CBMM 540, but only pending further assessment following the sign-on of CBMN-FM. The CRTC approved the CBC's application on July 3, 2015.

On February 20, 1992, the CRTC approved the CBC's application to change CBME's frequency to 830 kHz. CBME's change of frequency was necessary to eliminate nighttime interference received from CKIS Montréal which also operated on the 990 kHz frequency.

On April 4, 2016, the CBC filed and application to the CRTC to convert CBVE-1 to 101.9. The CRTC approved the CBC's application on June 16, 2016 to move CBVE-1 to 101.9 with an average effective radiated power of 265 watts and an effective height of antenna above average terrain of 106.2 metres. According to Canadian Radio News, CBVE-1 moved to 101.9 in August 2016.

On September 23, 2016, the CRTC approved the CBC's application to change the frequency of CBMA-FM 99.9 to 91.9 MHz by increasing the effective radiated power from 1,000 to 2,712 watts and decrease the effective height of antenna above average terrain from 145 to 110.2 metres.

On March 8, 2017, the CBC applied to convert CBMM 540 to 101.7 FM with the proposed callsign CBMM-FM.

On March 9, 2017, the CBC applied to convert CBMK 1230 to 92.7 FM. The CRTC approved the CBC's application to operate new FM transmitters in Lebel-sur-Quévillon and Senneterre on July 27, 2017.

In July 2020, CBMP-FM, previously a rebroadcaster of CBVE, formed its own network.

On May 6, 2022, the CRTC approved the CBC's application to increase the maximum effective radiated power (ERP) for CBVC from 420 to 29,939 watts, increasing the average ERP from 420 to 11,837 watts, replacing the existing non-directional antenna with a new directional antenna, and by decreasing the effective height of the antenna above average terrain from 110.5 to 108.5 metres and changing from class A to class B. The power increase for CBVC would cover Chapais located about 40 kilometers away which may no longer need the low-power AM rebroadcast transmitter, CBMD 1400.
