= 93.9 FM =

FM radio frequency

The following radio stations broadcast on FM frequency 93.9 MHz:

== Antarctica ==
- AFAN at McMurdo, Ross Dependency

== Argentina ==
- LRS792 Urbana in Bahía Blanca, Buenos Aires
- Visión de Futuro in Rosario, Santa Fe

== Australia ==
- Monaro FM in Jindabyne, New South Wales
- ABC Radio National in Tamworth, New South Wales
- 2LFF in Young, New South Wales
- ABC Radio National in Cairns, Queensland
- ABC Radio National in Emerald, Queensland
- ABC News Radio in Renmark, South Australia
- ABC Classic in Hobart, Tasmania
- 3BAY in Geelong, Victoria
- Love 93.9 in California (Later Love 94)

== Canada (Channel 230) ==
- CBHF-FM in North-East Margaree, Nova Scotia
- CBMZ-FM in Trois-Rivieres, Quebec
- CBX-2-FM in Edmonton, Alberta
- CBXG-FM in Peace River, Alberta
- CFNE-FM in Waswanipi, Quebec
- CFWC-FM in Brantford, Ontario
- CHBW-FM-1 in Nordegg, Alberta
- CICK-FM in Smithers, British Columbia
- CIDR-FM in Windsor, Ontario
- CIEL-FM-1 in Riviere-du-Loup, Quebec
- CIEL-FM-4 in Trois-Pistoles, Quebec
- CIKI-FM-2 in Ste-Marguerite-Marie, Quebec
- CIRB-FM in Confederation Bridge, Prince Edward Island
- CJLU-FM in Dartmouth, Nova Scotia
- CKIZ-FM-1 in Enderby, British Columbia
- CKKL-FM in Ottawa, Ontario
- VF2144 in Lillooet, British Columbia
- VF2318 in Blue River, British Columbia
- VF2420 in Camperville, Manitoba
- VF2422 in Ilford, Manitoba
- VF2459 in Saskatoon, Saskatchewan
- VF2579 in Bloodvein, Manitoba

== China ==
- CNR Business Radio in Nanping
- GRT Music Radio in Zhongshan, Shenzhen and Hong Kong

== Indonesia ==
- Mersi FM 93.9 in Tangerang, Banten, Indonesia

== Japan ==
- SBS Radio in Shizuoka

== Malaysia ==
- Bernama Radio in Klang Valley
- IKIMfm in Kuching, Sarawak

== Mexico ==
- XHEVZ-FM in Acayucan, Veracruz
- XHHY-FM in Querétaro, Querétaro
- XHIGA-FM in Iguala, Guerrero
- XHLZ-FM in Lázaro Cárdenas, Michoacán
- XHMO-FM in Morelia, Michoacán
- XHMV-FM in Hermosillo, Sonora
- XHMZS-FM in Mazatlán, Sinaloa
- XHONT-FM in Frontera, Coahuila
- XHPCHU-FM in Tapachula, Chiapas
- XHPMEN-FM in Ciudad del Carmen, Campeche
- XHLBL-FM in San Luis Río Colorado, Sonora
- XHRAW-FM in Ciudad Alemán, Tamaulipas
- XHRPL-FM in León, Guanajuato
- XHSC-FM in Zapopan, Jalisco
- XHSFP-FM in San Felipe, Baja California
- XHTEE-FM in Tehuacán, Puebla
- XHTGU-FM in Tuxtla Gutiérrez, Chiapas
- XHTXA-FM in Tuxpan, Veracruz
- XHVD-FM in Ciudad Allende, Coahuila
- XHWN-FM in Torreón, Coahuila
- XHYP-FM in El Limón, Tamaulipas

== New Zealand ==
- Brian FM in Timaru

== Philippines ==
- DWKC-FM in Manila
- DYXL-FM in Cebu City
- DXXL in Davao City
- DXCB in Zamboanga City
- DWAT in Laoag City
- DWRD-FM In Legazpi City

== South Korea ==
- CBS Music FM in Seoul Metropolitan Area

== United States (Channel 230) ==
- KAMJ in Gosnell, Arkansas
- KAVS-LP in Fallon, Nevada
- KBBU in Modesto, California
- KBNU in Uvalde, Texas
- KCWA in Loveland, Colorado
- KDMA-FM in Granite Falls, Minnesota
- KETO-LP in Aurora, Colorado
- KEXA in King City, California
- KFON in Groveton, Texas
- KGCG-LP in Blanchard, Oklahoma
- KGGM in Delhi, Louisiana
- KGKS in Scott City, Missouri
- KGMG-LP in Clovis, New Mexico
- KIAI in Mason City, Iowa
- KIMY in Watonga, Oklahoma
- KINT in El Paso, Texas
- KJMK in Webb City, Missouri
- KKMK in Rapid City, South Dakota
- KKOP-LP in Clay Center, Nebraska
- KLLI in Los Angeles, California
- KLUA in Kailua Kona, Hawaii
- KMGN in Flagstaff, Arizona
- KMXH in Alexandria, Louisiana
- KMXR in Corpus Christi, Texas
- KOTE in Eureka, Kansas
- KOYN in Paris, Texas
- KPAY-FM in Chico, California
- KPDQ in Portland, Oregon
- KQCJ in Cambridge, Illinois
- KQTR-LP in Purcell, Oklahoma
- KRIT in Parker, Arizona
- KRLL-FM in Circle, Arkansas
- KRLT in South Lake Tahoe, California
- KRTN in Raton, New Mexico
- KSAO in San Angelo, Texas
- KSOU in Sioux Center, Iowa
- KSPQ in West Plains, Missouri
- KSSZ in Fayette, Missouri
- KSWN in Mccook, Nebraska
- KTAC in Ephrata, Washington
- KTAK in Riverton, Wyoming
- KUAM in Agana, Guam
- KUBT in Honolulu, Hawaii
- KUQU in Enoch, Utah
- KVHJ-LP in Mission, Texas
- KWDW-LP in Oklahoma City, Oklahoma
- KWSS-LP in Scottsdale, Arizona
- KXDI in Belfield, North Dakota
- KYSL in Frisco, Colorado
- KZBQ in Pocatello, Idaho
- KZRD in Dodge City, Kansas
- WARX in Lewiston, Maine
- WAVC in Mio, Michigan
- WBKS in Columbus Grove, Ohio
- WCEZ in Carthage, Illinois
- WDOR in Sturgeon Bay, Wisconsin
- WDRR in Martinez, Georgia
- WDUC in Lynchburg, Tennessee
- WDXT in Dansville, New York
- WFIJ-LP in Rocky Mount, Virginia
- WGLD-FM in Conway, South Carolina
- WGRM-FM in Greenwood, Mississippi
- WJAI in Pearl, Mississippi
- WKBI in Saint Marys, Pennsylvania
- WKTG in Madisonville, Kentucky
- WKXZ in Norwich, New York
- WKYS in Washington, District of Columbia
- WLCL in Sellersburg, Indiana
- WLGM-LP in Edgewater, Florida
- WLIT in Chicago, Illinois
- WLQZ-LP in Warsaw, Indiana
- WLVB in Morrisville, Vermont
- WLXU-LP in Lexington, Kentucky
- WMEV in Marion, Virginia
- WMIA-FM in Miami Beach, Florida
- WMMA-FM in Nekoosa, Wisconsin
- WMTM in Moultrie, Georgia
- WNBY in Newberry, Michigan
- WNCB in Cary, North Carolina
- WNDX in Lawrence, Indiana
- WNYC in New York, New York
- WQMT in Hopewell, Tennessee
- WQSI in Union Springs, Alabama
- WRRR in Saint Marys, West Virginia
- WRSI in Turners Falls, Massachusetts
- WRWK-LP in Midlothian, Virginia
- WSCZ in Winnsboro, South Carolina
- WSEK-FM in Burnside, Kentucky
- WTAX-FM in Sherman, Illinois
- WTBX in Hibbing, Minnesota
- WTWF in Fairview, Pennsylvania
- WWGM in Selmer, Tennessee
- WWOD in Woodstock, Vermont
- WYTK in Rogersville, Alabama
