= Ceto (disambiguation) =

Ceto is a primordial sea goddess in Greek mythology.

Ceto may also refer to:

== Places ==
- Ceto Temple, a Hindu temple in Central Java
- Ceto, Lombardy, a comune in the Province of Brescia

== Other uses ==
- Ceto (mythology), other figures from Greek mythology
- 65489 Ceto, a trans-Neptunian scattered disc object
- CETO Wave Power, an underwater wave power technology

== See also ==
- Keto (disambiguation)
- Seto (disambiguation)
- Cetus (mythology) (Ketos), a general term for sea monsters in Greek mythology
