= WRWK =

WRWK may refer to:

- WRWK-LP, a low-power radio station (93.9 FM) licensed to serve Midlothian, Virginia, United States
- WTOD (FM), a radio station (106.5 FM) licensed to serve Delta, Ohio, United States, which held the call sign WRWK from 2000 to 2009
