= CIRB =

CIRB may refer to:

- CIRB (AM), a defunct radio station in Lac-Etchemin, Quebec
- Central Institute for Research on Buffaloes
- Central Institutional Review Board for the National Cancer Institute of the National Institutes of Health; see Cancer prevention
- Canada Industrial Relations Board

== See also ==
- CIRBP, Cold-inducible RNA-binding protein
