= CFYX-FM =

Radio station in Rimouski, Quebec, Canada

Coordinates: 48°27′56.16″N 68°12′33.12″W

- Rimouski, Quebec; Canada
- Broadcast area: Rimouski-Neigette Regional County Municipality
- Frequency: 93.3 MHz
- Branding: CFYX 93

Programming
- Language: French
- Format: News/Talk
- Affiliations: Cogeco; Rimouski Océanic

Ownership
- Owner: Groupe Radio Simard; (CFYX 99,3)

History
- First air date: October 9, 2007

Technical information
- Class: C1
- ERP: 18,200 watts

Links
- Website: cfyxrimouski.com

CFYX-FM is a French-language Canadian radio station located in Rimouski, Quebec.

Owned and operated by Radio Rimouski, part of Groupe Radio Simard, it broadcasts on 93.3 MHz with an effective radiated power of 18,197 watts using an omnidirectional antenna (class C1).

The station had a hot adult contemporary format under the FM 93 branding; although some programming from Cogeco-owned CHMP-FM and CKOI-FM in Montreal was aired. It is now a relay for the programming of CHMP-FM, with the exception of local shows airing in the morning, lunch and afternoon segments.

The station received CRTC approval in 2006 and went on the air on October 9, 2007 at 7 a.m.; part of its programming comes from the Cogeco Diffusion network. The station's original call sign (as assigned in November 2006) was CIEL-FM-6, but it was changed to CFYX-FM in May 2007.

On December 11, 2008, the station was authorized by the CRTC to add a rebroadcaster on 103.1 FM in Rivière-du-Loup.

On July 6, 2011, the station applied to add a new FM transmitter at Amqui. The proposed transmitter in Amqui was to be operated at 92.7 MHz; the application was withdrawn on September 23, 2011.

Former logo

On February 28, 2012 at 5:30 p.m., station management had shut down the station; executives deemed the station unprofitable. The station was put back on air on July 10, 2013.
