= KOKX =

KOKX may refer to:

- KOKX (AM), a radio station (1310 AM) licensed to Keokuk, Iowa, United States
- KQKL (FM), a radio station (95.3 FM) licensed to Keokuk, Iowa, which held the call sign KOKX-FM from 1984 to 2019
- The New York City regional weather forecast office (physically located in Upton, New York)
