= Seto =

Seto may refer to:

== Places ==
- Seto, Aichi, production place of Japanese pottery and venue of Expo 2005
- Seto Digital Tower, a television transmitting tower in Seto, Aichi Prefecture
- Seto, Ehime, facing the Seto Inland Sea
- Seto, Okayama, adjacent to Okayama, in Okayama Prefecture
- Seto Inland Sea of Japan
- Setomaa (Seto land), region in Estonia and Russia

== People and fictional characters ==
- Situ (surname), a Chinese surname (司徒), romanised from Cantonese as Seto or Szeto
  - Robert M. M. Seto (born 1936), American federal judge and law professor
  - Michael C. Seto (born 1967), Canadian psychologist and sex researcher
  - Andy Seto (born 1969), Hong Kong comic artist
  - Carwai Seto (born 1973), Canadian swimmer
- A Japanese surname (瀬戸)
  - Masato Seto (born 1953), Japanese photographer
  - Asaka Seto (born 1976), Japanese actress
  - Rocky Seto (born 1976), American football coach
  - Haruki Seto (born 1978), Japanese football player
  - Saori Seto (born 1983), Japanese voice actress
  - Taiki Seto (born 1983), Japanese Go player
  - Kōji Seto (born 1988), Japanese actor and singer
  - Takayuki Seto (born 1986), Japanese footballer
  - Asami Seto (born 1993), Japanese voice actress
  - Daiya Seto (born 1994), Japanese swimmer
  - Toshiki Seto (born 1995), Japanese actor
  - Yutaka Seto, fictional character in Battle Royale
  - Ichitaka Seto, fictional character in I"s
- A given name or nickname
  - Devin Setoguchi (born 1987), Canadian professional hockey player nicknamed "Seto"
  - Seto Kaiba, main character from the Japanese manga and anime series Yu-Gi-Oh!
  - Seto Kamiki, character from the Japanese anime Tenchi Muyo!
  - Seto, the father of Red XIII in the video game Final Fantasy VII

== Other uses ==
- Setos, an ethnic group in south-eastern Estonia and north-western Russia
  - Seto language, the language spoken by the Setos
- My Bride Is a Mermaid, a manga and anime series
- Seto (train), a former train service in Japan
- Sunrise Seto, a train service in Japan
- Great Seto Bridge, also Seto Ōhashi, a series of double deck bridges connecting Japanese islands Honshū and Shikoku
