= Keto =

Keto may refer to:

- The Ket people (also known as Кето), an ethnic group of the Siberian North
- Ceto or Keto, a sea goddess in Greek mythology
- Ketone or keto group, the functional group in the chemical compounds ketones
- Ketoconazole, a medication with antifungal and testosterone-inhibiting properties
- Keto diet, a high-fat, low-carb diet plan
- KETO-LP, a radio station licensed to serve Aurora, Colorado, United States

== See also ==
- Ceto (disambiguation)
- Quito
