= CHOX-FM =

Radio station in La Pocatière, Quebec

Coordinates: 47°20′57″N 69°57′38″W

- La Pocatière, Quebec; Canada
- Broadcast area: La Pocatière; Baie-Saint-Paul; Saint-Aubert; Sainte-Perpétue
- Frequency: 97.5 MHz
- Branding: CHOX 97,5

Programming
- Language: French
- Format: Adult contemporary

Ownership
- Owner: Groupe Radio Simard; (CIBM-FM Mont-Bleu Limitée)
- Sister stations: CIBM-FM, CIEL-FM

History
- First air date: August 1938
- Former call signs: CHGB (1938–1992)
- Former frequencies: 1310 kHz (–1992)

Technical information
- Class: B
- ERP: 25,160 watts
- HAAT: 127 metres (417 ft)

Links
- Website: chox97.com

CHOX-FM is a Canadian radio station that broadcasts a francophone adult contemporary format at 97.5 FM in La Pocatière, Quebec.

The station originally signed on as CHGB in 1938 and changed through a number of different AM frequencies, until it moved to its last spot at 1310 AM before being authorized to move to the FM band in 1990 and adopting its current callsign. On April 23, 1992, CHOX-FM signed on and in June 1992, the former AM transmitters left the air.

The station is currently owned by Groupe Radio Simard.

== Transmitters ==
Rebroadcasters of CHOX-FM
City of licence	Identifier	Frequency	Power	Class	RECNet	CRTC Decision
Baie-Saint-Paul	CHOX-FM-1	94.1 FM	50 watts	LP	Query	93-588
Saint-Aubert	CHOX-FM-3	100.1 FM	50 watts	LP	Query	2005-176
Sainte-Perpétue	CHOX-FM-2	101.1 FM	50 watts	LP	Query	2001-233
