= CIBM-FM =

Radio station in Rivière-du-Loup, Quebec

Coordinates: 47°34′39″N 69°22′55″W

- Rivière-du-Loup, Quebec; Canada
- Broadcast area: Rivière-du-Loup, Saint-Juste-du-Lac, Sully, Trois-Pistoles
- Frequency: 107.1 MHz
- Branding: FM 107

Programming
- Language: French
- Format: CHR/Top 40

Ownership
- Owner: Groupe Radio Simard
- Sister stations: CIEL-FM, CHOX-FM

History
- First air date: 1966
- Former call signs: CHGB-FM
- Former frequencies: 102.9 MHz (1966–1982)

Technical information
- Class: C
- ERP: 100,000 watts
- HAAT: 327.9 metres (1,076 ft)

Links
- Website: cibm107.com

CIBM-FM (107.1 MHz) is a French-language Canadian radio station located in Rivière-du-Loup, Quebec.

Owned and operated by Groupe Radio Simard, it broadcasts with an effective radiated power of 100,000 watts using an omnidirectional antenna (class C). The station has a CHR/Top 40 format branded as FM 107.

The station rebroadcasts CKOI-FM Montreal from 6 p.m. to 6:30 a.m.

CIBM was launched in 1966 as CHGB-FM at 102.9 FM, until it moved to its current frequency in 1982. The CIBM call sign was later adopted at an unknown date.

In 1986, it was authorized to increase its effective radiated power to 100,000 watts.

Previous logo

== Rebroadcasters ==
Rebroadcasters of CIBM-FM
City of licence	Identifier	Frequency	Power	Class	RECNet	CRTC Decision
Rivière-du-Loup	CIBM-FM-1	107.9 FM	125 watts	A1	Query	Decision CRTC 91-272
Saint-Juste-du-Lac	CIBM-FM-4	97.1 FM	50 watts	LP	Query	Broadcasting Decision CRTC 2002-400
Sully	CIBM-FM-3	96.7 FM	35 watts	LP	Query	Decision CRTC 2001-191
Trois-Pistoles	CIBM-FM-2	104.9 FM	1,000 watts	A	Query	
