= XHSFP-FM =

Radio station in San Felipe, Baja California

- San Felipe, Baja California; Mexico
- Frequency: 93.9 FM
- Branding: PSN Radio

Ownership
- Owner: Promomedios California; (Humberto Aréchiga Espinoza)
- Operator: PSI

History
- First air date: 1997; March 23, 2000 (concession)

Technical information
- Licensing authority: CRT
- Class: A
- ERP: 3 kW
- HAAT: −67.79 m (−222.4 ft)

Links
- Website: https://psn.si/

XHSFP-FM is a Mexican radio station in San Felipe, Baja California, Mexico. It is known as PSN Radio.

Logo as Xtrema 93.9
