= XHIGA-FM =

Radio station in Iguala, Guerrero, Mexico

- Iguala, Guerrero; Mexico
- Frequency: 93.9 MHz
- Branding: Ke Buena

Programming
- Format: Regional Mexican
- Affiliations: Radiópolis

Ownership
- Owner: Grupo Radio Cañón; (Radio Cañón, S.A. de C.V.)

History
- First air date: September 15, 1991 (concession)
- Call sign meaning: "Iguala"

Technical information
- ERP: 15 kW

XHIGA-FM is a radio station on 93.9 FM in Iguala, Guerrero. It is owned by Grupo Radio Cañón and carries the Ke Buena Regional Mexican format from Radiópolis.

== History ==
XHIGA received its concession on September 15, 1991. It was initially owned by María del Carmen Ibarra Fariña, an executive at Grupo ACIR. In 2008, ACIR sold the station to ABC Radio.

In 2021, NTR acquired the ABC Radio group from Organización Editorial Mexicana. On April 24, 2023, as part of a national alliance between the company and Radiópolis, 22 NTR-owned stations adopted franchise formats from Radiópolis, with XHIGA-FM taking on the La Ke Buena Regional Mexican franchise.
