= CIQI-FM =

Radio station in Montmagny, Quebec

Coordinates: 46°56′22″N 70°30′24″W

- Montmagny, Quebec; Canada
- Frequency: 90.3 MHz
- Branding: CiQi 90,3 FM

Programming
- Language: French
- Format: Hot adult contemporary

Ownership
- Owner: Groupe Radio Simard

History
- First air date: September 6, 2011

Technical information
- Class: B
- ERP: 17,460 watts (average); 41,600 watts (peak)
- HAAT: 97.7 metres (321 ft)

Links
- Webcast: Listen Live
- Website: ciqifm.com

CIQI-FM is a French-language Canadian radio station located in Montmagny, Quebec.

The station has an hot adult contemporary format and broadcasts on 90.3 MHz using a directional antenna with an average effective radiated power of 17,460 watts and a peak effective radiated power of 41,600 watts (class B).

CIQI-FM is owned and operated by Groupe Radio Simard.

== History ==
The station was authorized by the CRTC on August 26, 2008, and only began testing on June 24, 2011 This long delay was caused by the economic recession, and also by the fact that their transmitting equipment was vandalized on November 29, 2010. Regular programming began on September 6, 2011, at 4:40 p.m.

Montmagny was previously served by CFEL-FM, from 1987 until that station's move to Lévis in 2009, and by CKBM 1490, which closed due to a bankruptcy in 1983.

On August 20, 2012, CIQI changed formats to hot adult contemporary.

On February 6, 2013, the CRTC approved Radio Montmagny inc.'s application to add a new FM transmitter at Saint-Fabien-de-Panet which will operate at 92.5 MHz (channel 223B) with an average effective radiated power (ERP) of 12,600 watts (maximum ERP of 17,500 watts with an effective height of antenna above average terrain of 123.1 meters). On April 4, 2017, Radio Montmagny inc. submitted another application to add an FM transmitter at 92.5 MHz in Saint-Fabien-de-Panet, Quebec.
