= XHRAW-FM =

Radio station in Ciudad Miguel Alemán, Tamaulipas, Mexico

- Ciudad Miguel Alemán, Tamaulipas; Mexico
- Frequency: 93.9 MHz
- Branding: La Mejor FM

Programming
- Format: Grupera
- Affiliations: MVS Radio

Ownership
- Owner: NRT México; (Rolando Ramiro González Treviño)

History
- First air date: November 30, 1994 (concession)
- Former call signs: XHCDL-FM (1994-98)

Technical information
- Licensing authority: CRT
- Class: A
- ERP: 2.6 kW
- HAAT: 18.2 m (60 ft)

Links
- Webcast: Listen live
- Website: lamejor.com.mx

XHRAW-FM is a radio station on 93.9 FM in Ciudad Miguel Alemán, Tamaulipas, Mexico. It is owned by NRT México and carries the La Mejor FM grupera format from MVS Radio.

== History ==
XHRAW received its concession on November 30, 1994 as XHCDL-FM. It was owned by María Garza Acosta. The callsign was changed to the current XHRAW-FM on March 17, 1998, and the station was sold to Rolando Ramiro González Treviño in 2000.

In 2017, operation of XHRAW was transferred from Grupo AS Comunicación, a regional Radiorama component, to Grupo Larsa Comunicaciones, which immediately instituted the Toño adult hits format, replacing the longtime La Poderosa imaging. That only lasted several months before Larsa ceased operating the station, with XHRAW flipped to Fiesta Mexicana on February 20, 2018.

NRT took over operations itself in 2020. In November 2021, XHRAW adopted the La Mejor grupera format from MVS Radio.
