= XHLZ-FM (Michoacán) =

Radio station in Lázaro Cárdenas, Michoacán

- Lázaro Cárdenas, Michoacán; Mexico
- Frequency: 93.9 MHz
- Branding: La Pura Ley

Programming
- Format: Regional Mexican

Ownership
- Owner: Medios Radiofónicos Michoacán; (Stereo 94 de Michoacán, S.A. de C.V.)

History
- First air date: June 27, 1983 (concession)
- Call sign meaning: LáZaro Cárdenas

Technical information
- ERP: 19,700 watts

Links
- Website: www.radiomejor.com

XHLZ-FM is a radio station in Lázaro Cárdenas, Michoacán. Broadcasting on 93.9 FM, XHLZ is owned by Medios Radiofónicos Michoacán and carries a Regional Mexican format known as La Pura Ley.

== History ==
Guillermina Hernández Corona received the concession for XHLZ in 1983.
