= CHJM-FM =

Radio station in Saint-Georges, Quebec

Coordinates: 46°09′32″N 70°44′50″W

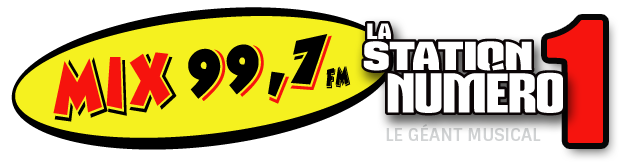

Saint-Georges, Quebec; Canada
- Frequency: 99.7 MHz
- Branding: Mix 99,7

Programming
- Language: French
- Format: Contemporary hit radio

Ownership
- Owner: Groupe Radio Simard; (Radio Beauce inc.)
- Sister stations: CKRB-FM

History
- First air date: June 22, 1987
- Former call signs: CIRO-FM (1987-)

Technical information
- Class: C1
- ERP: 100,000 watts
- HAAT: 158.5 metres (520 ft)

Links
- Website: mix997.com

CHJM-FM is a French-language Canadian radio station located in Saint-Georges, Quebec.

Owned and operated by Groupe Radio Simard, it broadcasts on 99.7 MHz using a directional antenna with an average effective radiated power of 100,000 watts (class C1). The station has a CHR/Top 40 format branded as Mix 99,7.

The station received CRTC approval in 1986. and was launched on June 22, 1987, and originally broadcast with the call sign CIRO-FM.

Before its change of call letters, CIRO broadcast a country music format. The station was referred to on air as Le FM country du Québec.
