= CFNE-FM =

First Nations radio station in Quebec, Canada

Coordinates: 49°41′44″N 75°58′19″W

- Waswanipi, Quebec; Canada
- Frequency: 93.9 FM

Programming
- Format: community radio

Ownership
- Owner: Waswanipi Communications Society

Technical information
- Class: B
- ERP: 6.2 kWs horizontal polarization only
- HAAT: 109 meters (358 ft)

CFNE-FM is a First Nations community radio station that broadcasts at 93.9 FM in Waswanipi, Quebec, Canada.

The station is owned by Waswanipi Communications Society. It's uncertain if the radio station is in operation.
