= Groupe Radio Simard =

Canadian radio broadcasting company

Groupe Radio Simard is a Canadian radio broadcasting company, which owns eight radio stations in the Bas-Saint-Laurent, Chaudière-Appalaches and Côte-Nord regions of Quebec. The company's headquarters is in Rivière-du-Loup.

== Stations ==
- La Pocatière - CHOX-FM
- Montmagny - CIQI-FM
- Rimouski - CFYX-FM
- Rivière-du-Loup - CIBM-FM, CIEL-FM
- Saint-Georges - CHJM-FM, CKRB-FM
- Trois-Pistoles - CIEL-FM-4
- Baie-Comeau - CHLC-FM
