= CKRB-FM =

Radio station in Saint-Georges, Quebec

Coordinates: 46°09′32″N 70°44′50″W

Saint-Georges, Quebec; Canada
- Broadcast area: Beauce-Sartigan Regional County Municipality
- Frequency: 103.5 MHz
- Branding: Cool FM 103,5

Programming
- Language: French
- Format: Adult contemporary

Ownership
- Owner: Groupe Radio Simard; (Radio Beauce inc.)
- Sister stations: CHJM-FM

History
- First air date: July 22, 1952
- Former call signs: CHRB (1952–1999)
- Former frequencies: 1400 kHz (1952–1959); 1250 kHz (1959–1965); 1460 kHz (1965–1999); 103.3 MHz (1999–2009)

Technical information
- Class: B
- ERP: 15.01 kW
- HAAT: 124.9 metres (410 ft)

Links
- Website: coolfm.biz

CKRB-FM (Cool FM 103,5) is a French-language Canadian radio station located in Saint-Georges, Quebec.

Owned and operated by Radio Beauce, a subsidiary of Groupe Radio Simard, it broadcasts on 103.5 MHz with an effective radiated power of 17,000 watts (class B) using an omnidirectional antenna.

== History ==
CKRB went on the air on July 22, 1952 as an AM station broadcasting on 1400 kHz; at the time the station only had a power of 250 watts. In 1959, CKRB moved to 1250 kHz with 5,000 watts. In 1965, CKRB would later move to 1460 kHz and increase its power to 10,000 watts (daytime) and 5,000 watts (nighttime). By 1985, CKRB had converted its transmitter to AM stereo. The station moved to the FM band at 103.3 MHz on March 29, 1999.

In 2005, the station was authorized by the Canadian Radio-television and Telecommunications Commission (CRTC) to change CKRB-FM's frequency from 103.3 MHz to 103.5 MHz and increase its power to 17,000 watts as a class B station. It moved to 103.5 in January 2009.

The station has an adult contemporary format and identifies itself as Cool FM 103,5.

== Notes ==
CIRB in Lac-Etchemin was a rebroadcaster of CKRB Saint-Georges that operated from 1977 until it went off the air in 1991.
