= XHVD-FM =

Radio station in Ciudad Allende, Coahuila

- Ciudad Allende, Coahuila; Mexico
- Broadcast area: Ciudad Allende, Coahuila
- Frequency: 93.9 MHz
- Branding: Radio Sensacional Digital

Ownership
- Owner: Josue Rodrigo, José Luis and Rosario del Carmen Moreno Aguirre

History
- First air date: November 9, 1976 (concession)

Technical information
- Licensing authority: CRT
- Class: AA
- ERP: 6 kW
- HAAT: 41.88 m (137.4 ft)
- Transmitter coordinates: 28°19′50″N 100°50′54.3″W

Links
- Website: www.radioxevd.com

XHVD-FM is a radio station on 93.9 FM in Ciudad Allende, Coahuila, Mexico. It is known as Radio Sensacional Digital.

== History ==
XEVD-AM received its concession on November 9, 1976. It was owned by José Luis Moreno Vázquez and broadcast with 1 kW on 1380 kHz. After Moreno Vázquez's death, the station was transferred to his heirs.
