= XHTGU-FM =

Radio station in Tuxtla Gutiérrez, Chiapas, Mexico

- Tuxtla Gutiérrez, Chiapas; Mexico
- Frequency: 93.9 FM
- Branding: Tuchtlán FM

Programming
- Format: Public radio

Ownership
- Owner: Government of the State of Chiapas
- Operator: Chiapas Radio, Television, and Cinematography System

History
- First air date: September 15, 1994
- Call sign meaning: "Tuxtla Gutiérrez"

Technical information
- ERP: 59 kW
- Transmitter coordinates: 16°44′06″N 93°07′09″W

Links
- Webcast: Listen live
- Website: radiotvycine.chiapas.gob.mx

XHTGU-FM is a radio station on 93.9 FM in Tuxtla Gutiérrez, Chiapas, Mexico. It is the flagship of the state-owned Radio Chiapas state network and is known as Tuchtlán FM.

== History ==
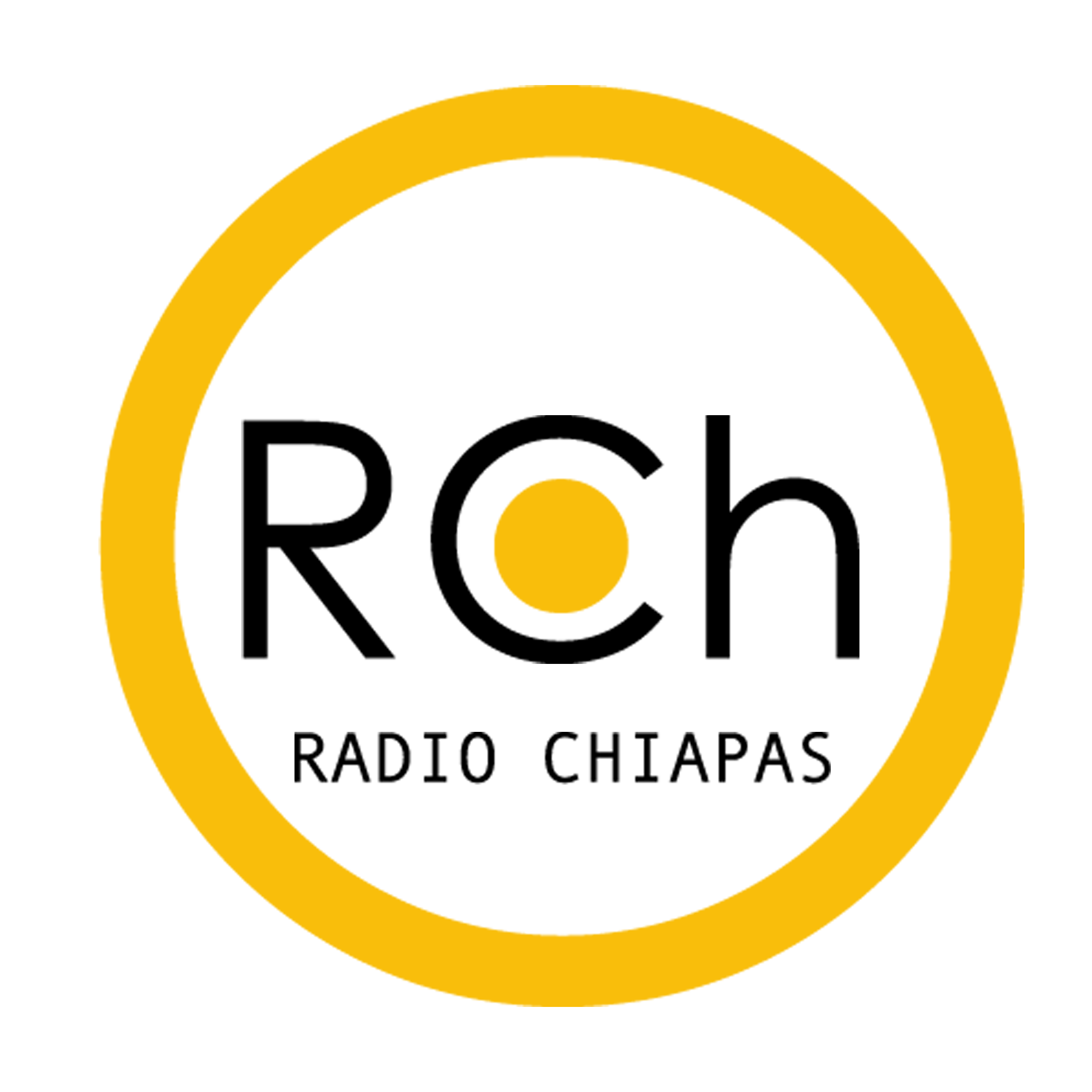
XHTGU as Radio Chiapas

XHTGU came on air on September 15, 1994. It began broadcasting under the name of Stereo 94 and in 2002 it was named La Radio de Todos. From 2007 to 2020, it was known as Vida FM.

The renaming of the 93.9 FM station—part of the Chiapas Radio, Television, and Cinematography System—to Tuchtlán FM took place on Monday, June 9, 2025.
