= XHRPL-FM =

Radio station in León, Guanajuato, Mexico

- León, Guanajuato; Mexico
- Frequency: 93.9 MHz
- Branding: La Poderosa RPL

Programming
- Format: Regional Mexican

Ownership
- Owner: Radio Promotora Leonesa; (El Poder de las Noticias, S.A. de C.V.)

History
- First air date: March 20, 1953 (concession); 1994 (FM)
- Former call signs: XEKX-AM / XERPL-AM
- Former frequencies: 1270 kHz
- Call sign meaning: Former concessionaire Radio Promotora Leonesa

Technical information
- Class: B1
- ERP: 10,000 watts
- HAAT: −52.2 meters (−171 ft)

Links
- Webcast: Listen live
- Website: www.lapoderosa.com.mx

XHRPL-FM is a radio station on 93.9 FM in León, Guanajuato. It is owned by Radio Promotora Leonesa and carries a Regional Mexican format known as La Poderosa.

== History ==
XEKX-AM received its first concession on March 20, 1953, owned by León Radio, S.A. In the 1960s, XEKX became XERPL-AM, and the concession later changed to reflect the full name of its owner, Radio Promotora Leonesa.

In 1994, XERPL became an AM-FM combo. The AM frequency was surrendered on November 10, 2020.
