= XHEVZ-FM =

Radio station in Acayucan, Veracruz, Mexico

Acayucan, Veracruz, Mexico; Mexico
- Frequency: 93.9 MHz
- Branding: La Ke Buena

Programming
- Format: Regional Mexican
- Affiliations: Radiópolis

Ownership
- Owner: Radio La Veraz, S.A. de C.V.

History
- First air date: December 15, 1960 (concession)
- Call sign meaning: VeracruZ

Technical information
- ERP: 25 kW
- Transmitter coordinates: 17°57′40″N 94°55′09″W

Links
- Webcast: Listen live
- Website: kebuenaacayucan.com.mx

XHEVZ-FM is a radio station on 93.9 FM in Acayucan, Veracruz, Mexico, carries the La Ke Buena Regional Mexican format from Radiópolis.

== History ==
XEVZ-AM 1490 received its concession on December 15, 1960. It was owned by María de Lourdes Clementina Septién and broadcast with 1,000 watts during the day and 200 watts at night. Raymundo Martínez Domínguez became the concessionaire in 1964.

In April 1996, XEVZ moved from 1490 to 1290 kHz; in September 1997, XEVZ headed to 870 kHz and lowered its power from 1,000 watts to 250; and finally, in November 1998, XEVZ landed at 1210 with 5,000 watts day and 1,000 at night.

Martínez Domínguez's estate, headed by Laura Escamilla Decuir, took over the concession in April 2006.

XEVZ moved to FM in 2010 as XHEVZ-FM 93.9.
