= XHMV-FM =

Radio station in Hermosillo, Sonora, Mexico

- Hermosillo, Sonora; Mexico
- Frequency: 93.9 FM
- Branding: La Tremenda

Ownership
- Owner: Radio Resultados; (XHMV-FM, S.A. de C.V.)
- Operator: 4D Media

History
- First air date: August 25, 1987 (concession)

Technical information
- Licensing authority: CRT
- Class: B1
- ERP: 6 kW
- HAAT: 183.7 m (603 ft)

XHMV-FM is a radio station on 93.9 FM in Hermosillo, Sonora, Mexico. It is owned by Radio Resultados and operated by 4D Media. The station carries a format known as La Tremenda.

== History ==
XHMV received its concession on August 25, 1987. It was later owned by Radiorama through its subsidiary, Espectáculo Auditivo, S.A.

Since its beginnings, XHMV-FM was operated by Uniradio and was known as La Z 93.

In September 2022, Uniradio returned control of XHMV to Radiorama.

In late September 2022, Uniradio reached an agreement to outright purchase XHDM-FM 102.7 from Grupo ACIR, resulting in the migration of La Zeta to that frequency. The simulcast ended in April 2023 with the introduction of the new La Rancherita format. Larsa took over the station and launched its Toño brand in January 2024.

On November 11, 2026, 4D Media Network took control of XHMV-FM 93.9 MHz, introducing its new format, La Tremenda 93.9 FM. The station now features Regional Mexican music.
