= CIEL-FM-4 =

Radio station in Trois-Pistoles, Quebec

Coordinates: 48°06′19.08″N 69°10′13.08″W

- Trois-Pistoles, Quebec; Canada
- Broadcast area: Les Basques Regional County Municipality
- Frequency: 93.9 MHz
- Branding: CIEL

Programming
- Language: French
- Format: Adult contemporary

Ownership
- Owner: Groupe Radio Simard; (Radio CJFP (1986) ltée)

History
- First air date: 1985
- Former call signs: CJTF-FM (1985–2001)

Technical information
- Class: A1
- ERP: 229 watts
- HAAT: 34 metres (112 ft)

Links
- Website: ciel103.com

CIEL-FM-4 is a French-language Canadian radio station located in Trois-Pistoles, Quebec. The station airs a mix of locally produced programming and simulcasting of CIEL-FM in Rivière-du-Loup.

Owned and operated by Radio CJFP (1986) ltée, which is part of Groupe Radio Simard, the station broadcasts on 93.9 MHz with an effective radiated power of 229 watts using an omnidirectional antenna (class A1). It features an adult contemporary format under the CIEL branding.

== History ==
The station's roots date back to 1970, when CIEL's AM predecessor CJFP was authorized by the Canadian Radio-television and Telecommunications Commission to add some programming from a studio in Trois-Pistoles to the main AM signal originating in Rivière-du-Loup. However, because the AM signal failed to adequately serve Trois-Pistoles at nighttime, an FM rebroadcaster with the call sign CJTF-FM was added in 1985.

This transmitter was deleted from CJFP's license in 1997, becoming a separate station with a license commitment to air at least 10 hours per week of distinct programming at Trois-Pistoles. The station adopted its current call sign in 2001, at the same time CJFP became CIEL-FM.
