= KOKX (AM) =

- Keokuk, Iowa; United States
- Broadcast area: Keokuk, Iowa; Fort Madison, Iowa
- Frequency: 1310 kHz

Programming
- Format: Talk & Sports
- Affiliations: Radio America; Westwood One

Ownership
- Owner: Michael Greenwald and Leah Jones; (Keokuk Broadcasting Inc)
- Sister stations: WCEZ

History
- First air date: October 19, 1947

Technical information
- Licensing authority: FCC
- Facility ID: 58264
- Class: B
- Power: 1,000 watts day 500 watts night
- Transmitter coordinates: 40°22′50″N 91°21′09″W
- Translator: 93.3 K227DO (Keokuk)

Links
- Public license information: Public file; LMS
- Webcast: Listen Live
- Website: radiokeokuk.com

KOKX (1310 kHz) is a commercial AM radio station serving the Keokuk, Iowa area. The station primarily broadcasts a talk and sports format. KOKX is owned by Leah Jones and Michael Greenwald, Keokuk Broadcasting Inc. operating as Radio Keokuk.

During daytime broadcasts, the station uses a single tower with essentially an omnidirectional pattern. During the nighttime, KOKX reduces power and switches to an antenna system that uses three towers arranged in a directional array that concentrates the signal toward the northwest, with a smaller lobe to the southeast.

== History ==
KOKX began broadcasting October 19, 1947, as a 250-watt daytime only station. The licensee was Keokuk Broadcasting Company, and the station was affiliated with the Iowa Tall Corn Network.

Logo before translator sign on

On June 27, 2016, KOKX changed their format from adult standards to country. The station was then reformatted to local news, talk and sports upon the 2018 ownership change.
