= KBBU =

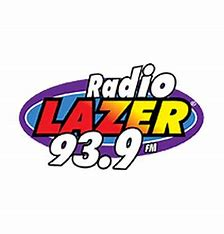
- Modesto, California; United States
- Frequency: 93.9 MHz
- Branding: Radio Lazer 93.9

Programming
- Format: Regional Mexican

Ownership
- Owner: Lazer Media; (Lazer Licenses, LLC)

History
- First air date: January 13, 1995
- Former call signs: KEJC (1995–2004)

Technical information
- Licensing authority: FCC
- Facility ID: 43335
- Class: A
- ERP: 4,000 watts
- HAAT: 123 meters (404 ft)
- Transmitter coordinates: 37°39′0″N 121°1′24″W

Links
- Public license information: Public file; LMS
- Website: radiolazer.com/modesto

KBBU (93.9 FM) is a radio station broadcasting a Regional Mexican format. Licensed to Modesto, California, United States, the station serves the greater Modesto area. Bustos Media used to own the station. In September 2010, Bustos transferred most of its licenses to Adelante Media Group as part of a settlement with its lenders.

Adelante Media sold KBBU and four sister stations to Lazer Broadcasting (now Lazer Media) effective December 31, 2014, at a price of $2.9 million.

== History ==
The station was assigned the call sign KEJC on January 13, 1995. On September 16, 2004, the station changed its call sign to the current KBBU.
