= KGCG-LP =

- Blanchard, Oklahoma; United States
- Frequency: 93.9 MHz
- Branding: Keeping God's Country Gospel 93.9

Programming
- Format: Religious

Ownership
- Owner: J&C Country Church, Inc.

History
- First air date: 2015
- Call sign meaning: "K"eeping "G"od's "C"ountry "G"ospel

Technical information
- Licensing authority: FCC
- Facility ID: 195875
- Class: LP1
- ERP: 86 watts
- HAAT: 27.86 meters (91.4 ft)
- Transmitter coordinates: 35°03′24.20″N 97°43′15.40″W

Links
- Public license information: LMS
- Webcast: https://eu4.radioboss.fm:2199/start/kgcg/
- Website: http://www.kgcgfmradio.com/

KGCG-LP (93.9 FM) is a low-power FM radio station licensed to Blanchard, Oklahoma, United States. The station is currently owned by J&C Country Church, Inc.

== History ==
The station call sign KGCG-LP on February 12, 2014.
