= CIRB (AM) =

Former radio station in Lac-Etchemin, Quebec

Defunct
- Lac-Etchemin, Quebec; Canada
- Frequency: 1240 kHz

Programming
- Language: French

Ownership
- Owner: Radio Beauce Inc.

History
- First air date: October 16, 1977
- Last air date: May 14, 1991

Technical information
- Power: 1,000 watts

CIRB was a radio station which operated on the frequency of 1240 kHz/AM in Lac-Etchemin, Quebec, Canada. The station was owned by Radio Beauce Inc., and broadcast at a power of 1,000 watts at all times.

== History ==
On November 18, 1975, the CRTC denied Radio Beauce an AM rebroadcaster at Lac-Etchemin for its Saint-Georges station, CKRB 1460; the rebroadcaster was to have operated on 920 kHz with 1,000 watts. Radio Beauce would receive approval in 1976 for a new AM station at Lac-Etchemin, this time at 1240 kHz with a daytime power of 1,000 watts and night-time power of 250 watts; as in the initial application, programming would originate with CKRB, with four hours of local programming daily for the Lac-Etchemin area. CIRB signed on the air on October 16, 1977.

On December 13, 1984, Radio Beauce received approval to increase CIRB's night power from 250 watts to 1,000 watts.

=== Closure ===
On May 14, 1991, Radio Beauce received approval for the revocation of the licence of CIRB, following accusations that the station was not meeting its music quotas, in which the station voluntarily decided to cease broadcasting and have its license revoked instead.
