= WYTK =

- Rogersville, Alabama; United States
- Broadcast area: Florence-Muscle Shoals
- Frequency: 93.9 MHz
- Branding: The Score

Programming
- Format: Sports
- Affiliations: ESPN Radio, CBS News Radio

Ownership
- Owner: Gregory H. Thornton; (Valley Broadcasting, Inc.)

History
- First air date: January 1994 (as WFIX)
- Former call signs: WFIX (1991–2000)

Technical information
- Licensing authority: FCC
- Facility ID: 14052
- Class: A
- ERP: 2,250 watts
- HAAT: 162 meters (531 ft)
- Transmitter coordinates: 34°51′52″N 87°23′43″W

Links
- Public license information: Public file; LMS
- Webcast: Listen live
- Website: 939thescore.com

WYTK (93.9 FM) is a radio station broadcasting a sports format. Licensed to Rogersville, Alabama, United States, the station serves the Florence-Muscle Shoals area. The station is owned by Gregory H. Thornton, through licensee Valley Broadcasting, Inc., and features programming from ESPN Radio and CBS Radio.

The station is an affiliate of the Atlanta Braves radio network.
