= KYSL =

- Frisco, Colorado; United States
- Broadcast area: Breckenridge and Vail, Colorado
- Frequency: 93.9 MHz (HD Radio)
- Branding: Krystal 93

Programming
- Format: Adult album alternative
- Subchannels: HD2: Country; HD3: Classic rock
- Affiliations: AP Radio

Ownership
- Owner: Krystal Broadcasting, Incorporated

History
- First air date: May 1988
- Call sign meaning: "Krystal"

Technical information
- Licensing authority: FCC
- Facility ID: 35577
- Class: A
- ERP: 560 watts
- HAAT: 324.0 meters (1,063.0 ft)
- Transmitter coordinates: 39°33′22″N 106°6′53″W
- Translators: HD2: 93.1 K226CI (Breckenridge); HD3: 103.3 K277DB (Silverthorne)

Links
- Public license information: Public file; LMS
- Webcast: Listen live
- Website: krystal93.com

KYSL (93.9 FM, "Krystal 93") is a radio station licensed to Frisco, Colorado, United States, broadcasting an adult album alternative format. The station is currently owned by Krystal Broadcasting, Incorporated and features programming from AP Radio. KYSL transmits on 93.9 in Summit County (which includes Frisco, Dillon, Keystone, Breckenridge), 93.1 in Eagle County (Vail area), and 92.3 in Clear Creek County (Loveland Ski Area).

Krystal 93 first signed on in May 1988, and during its first 11 years on the air, the station was broadcasting an adult contemporary format. In 2001 it flipped to its current format of adult album alternative while retaining the Krystal branding and the KYSL call letters.

== Translators ==
In addition to the main station, KYSL has two translators to widen its broadcast area.

Broadcast translators for KYSL
| Call sign | Frequency | City of license | FID | FCC info |
|---|---|---|---|---|
| K226AH | 93.1 FM | Frisco, CO | 76106 | LMS |
| K222BQ | 92.3 FM | Graymont, CO | 142597 | LMS |
