= KOTE =

Radio station in Eureka, Kansas

Coordinates: 37°47′29″N 96°17′25″W

- Eureka, Kansas; United States
- Frequency: 93.9 MHz
- Branding: Coyote 93.9

Programming
- Format: Country

Ownership
- Owner: Stephen J. Brown, Jr.

History
- First air date: 1988
- Former frequencies: 93.5 FM (1988–2014)
- Call sign meaning: Coyote

Technical information
- Licensing authority: FCC
- Facility ID: 48789
- Class: A
- ERP: 6000 Watts
- HAAT: 98 meters

Links
- Public license information: Public file; LMS
- Webcast: Listen live
- Website: www.stecklinecommunications.com/kote

KOTE is a radio station in Eureka, Kansas, playing country music, CBS news, and local weather.
