= WDUC =

Coordinates: 35°22′40″N 86°21′54″W

- Lynchburg, Tennessee; United States
- Broadcast area: Tullahoma, Tennessee; Shelbyville, Tennessee
- Frequency: 93.9 MHz
- Branding: 93.9 The Duck

Programming
- Format: Classic rock

Ownership
- Owner: Peter Bowman; (Bowman Broadcasting, LLC)

History
- First air date: 2011

Technical information
- Licensing authority: FCC
- Facility ID: 181075
- Class: A
- ERP: 4,100 watts
- HAAT: 118.6 meters (389 ft)

Links
- Public license information: Public file; LMS
- Webcast: Listen live
- Website: 939theduck.com

WDUC (93.9 FM) is a radio station licensed to Lynchburg, Tennessee. The station broadcasts a classic rock format and is owned by Josh and Holly Peterson, through Peterson Media Group Inc (Coffee County Broadcasting Inc).
