= Seto (train) =

Japanese overnight sleeper train service (1950–1998)

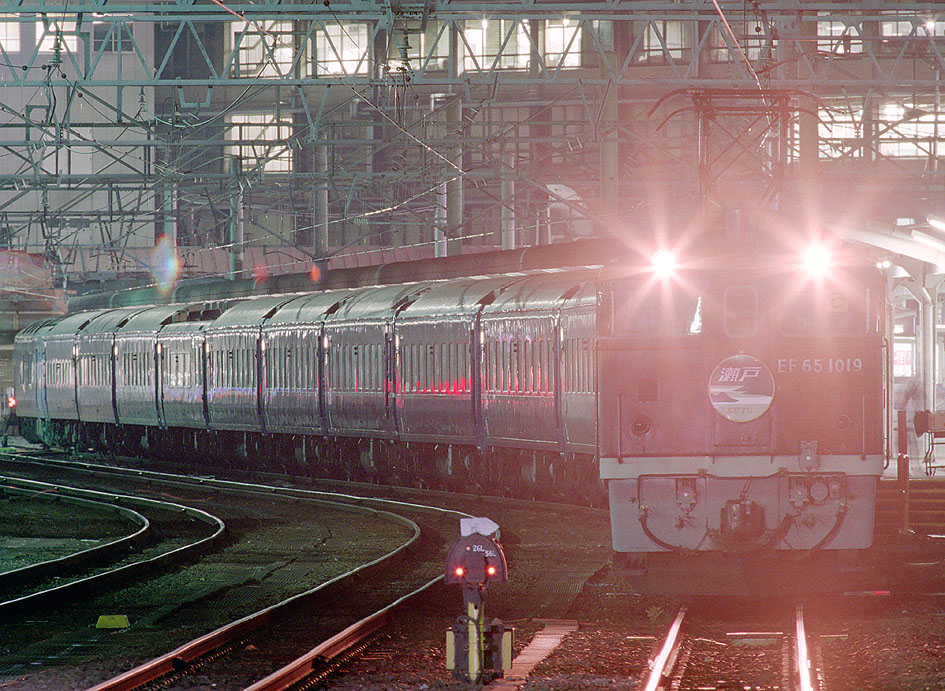
- A Seto service at Takamatsu Station, October 1995

Overview
- Service type: Limited express
- Status: Discontinued
- Locale: Japan
- First service: 1 April 1950 (Express); 15 March 1972 (Limited express)
- Last service: 10 July 1998
- Successor: Sunrise Seto
- Current operator(s): JR West
- Former operator(s): JNR

Route
- Termini: Tokyo; Takamatsu
- Distance travelled: 805.0 km (500.2 mi)
- Average journey time: 10 hours 35 minutes (1998)
- Service frequency: 1 return working daily

Technical
- Rolling stock: 24/25 series sleeping cars
- Track gauge: 1,067 mm (3 ft 6 in)
- Electrification: 1,500 V DC

The Seto (瀬戸) was a limited express Blue Train overnight sleeping car train service in Japan operated by Japanese National Railways (JNR) and later by West Japan Railway Company (JR West), which ran from Tokyo to Takamatsu in Kagawa Prefecture in Shikoku until July 1998.

== Rolling stock ==
In its latter years, the Seto service was operated using 24/25 series sleeping cars. The train was hauled by a JR East Tabata (Tokyo)-based EF65-1000 DC electric locomotive throughout.

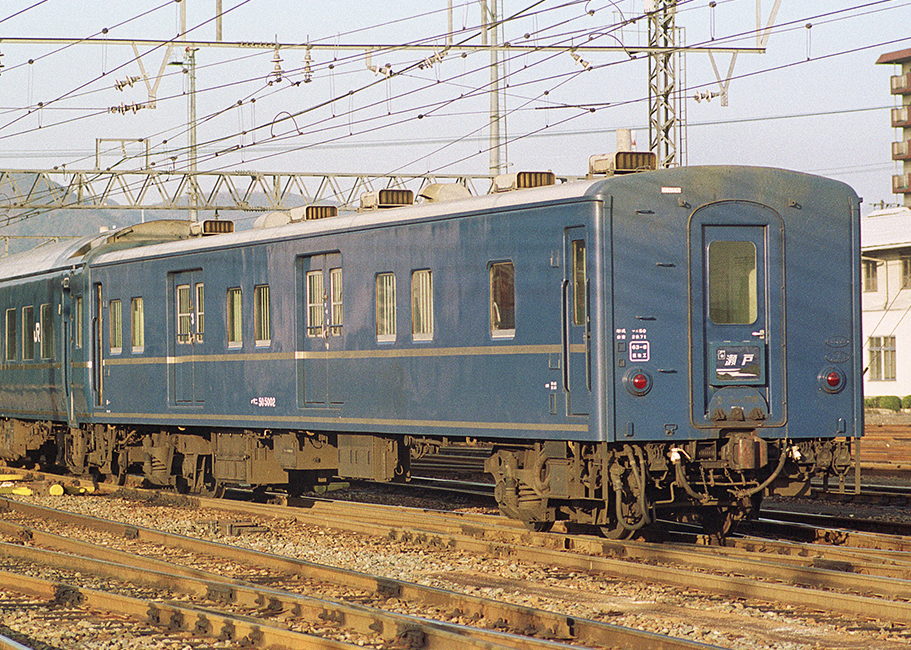
A JR West MaNi 50-5000 luggage van at the rear of a Seto service in 1990

== History ==
The Seto service commenced on 1 April 1950, as an "express" service operating between Tokyo and Uno in Okayama Prefecture. From 11 November 1956, the name was changed to kanji, written as 瀬戸. From 15 March 1972, the train was upgraded to become a "limited express" service. In 1977, the 20 series sleeping cars were replaced by 24/25 series sleeping cars.

From 10 April 1988, the service was rerouted to use the newly opened Great Seto Bridge, and operate between Tokyo and Takamatsu in Kagawa Prefecture.

From the start of the revised timetable on 10 July 1998, the Seto services were discontinued and replaced by new 285 series electric multiple unit trains running as the Sunrise Seto together with the Sunrise Izumo.

== See also ==
- Blue Train (Japan)
