= Sunrise Seto =

Japanese overnight sleeper train service

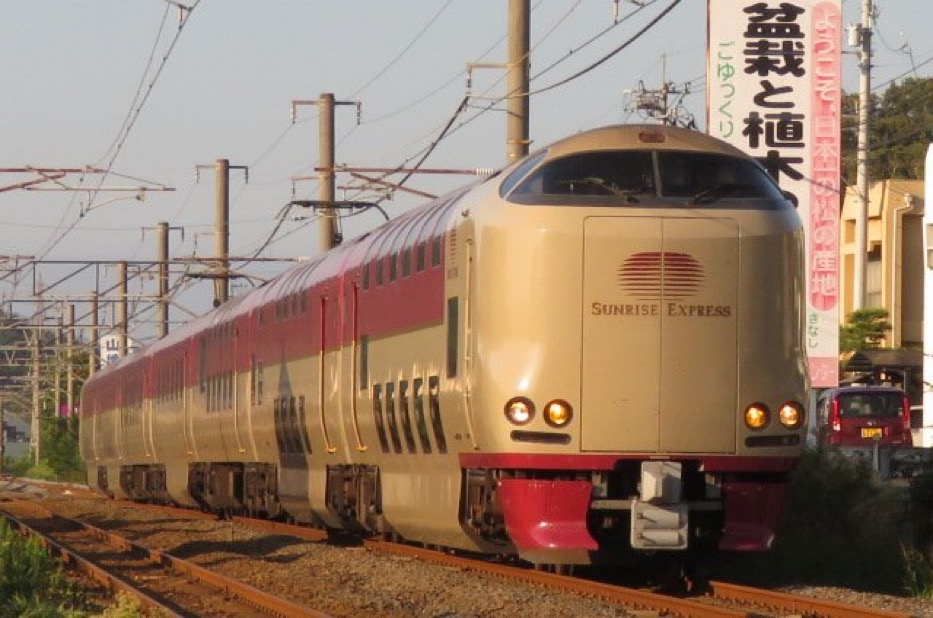
- 285 series EMU on a Sunrise Seto service, 2019

Overview
- Service type: Limited express
- Status: Operational
- Locale: Japan
- Predecessor: Seto
- First service: 10 July 1998
- Current operators: JR East; JR Central; JR West; JR Shikoku

Route
- Termini: Tokyo; Takamatsu (extended to Kotohira seasonally)
- Distance travelled: 804.7 km (500 mi)
- Average journey time: 9 hours, 30 minutes
- Service frequency: 1 round-trip daily
- Train numbers: Westbound: 5031M; Eastbound: 5032M
- Lines used: Tōkaidō Main Line, Tōkaidō Freight Line, San'yō Main Line, Uno Line, Honshi-Bisan Line, Yosan Line, Dosan Line

On-board services
- Seating arrangements: None
- Sleeping arrangements: Private compartments/open berths
- Catering facilities: Vending machines

Technical
- Rolling stock: 285 series
- Track gauge: 1,067 mm (3 ft 6 in)
- Electrification: Overhead line, 1,500 V DC
- Operating speed: 130 km/h (81 mph)

The Sunrise Seto (Japanese: サンライズ瀬戸, Hepburn: Sanraizu Seto) is an overnight sleeping car train service in Japan operated by the East Japan Railway Company (JR East), Central Japan Railway Company (JR Central), West Japan Railway Company (JR West), and Shikoku Railway Company (JR Shikoku) since July 1998.

== Operations ==
The Sunrise Seto runs daily between Tokyo and Takamatsu in Kagawa Prefecture on the island of Shikoku, taking 9 hours and 42 minutes eastbound and 10 hours 1 minute westbound across the 804.7 km (500.0 mi) journey. Between Tokyo and Okayama, the service operates in conjunction with the Sunrise Izumo service to Izumoshi. The combined 14-car train departs from Tokyo, and stops at Yokohama, Atami, Numazu, Fuji, Shizuoka, Hamamatsu (final midnight stop), Himeji (first morning stop), and arrives at Okayama, where the train splits, with the Sunrise Izumo half of the train heading to Izumoshi. Between Okayama and Takamatsu, the 7-car Sunrise Seto train stops at Kojima and Sakaide, before arriving in Takamatsu. The return train departs from Takamatsu, and is coupled with the Sunrise Izumo from Izumoshi at Okayama Station, departing together from there, and arriving at Tokyo Station in the next morning.

There are seasonal extended services which Sunrise Seto trains from Tokyo run beyond Takamatsu, to Kotohira on the Dosan Line. These extended service trains run during particular seasons (Differs each year), and during the holidays.

Sunrise Izumo and Sunrise Seto pass through stations in Nagoya and Kyoto without stopping due to the fact that they arrive at these stations around midnight and are unable to play the announcements.

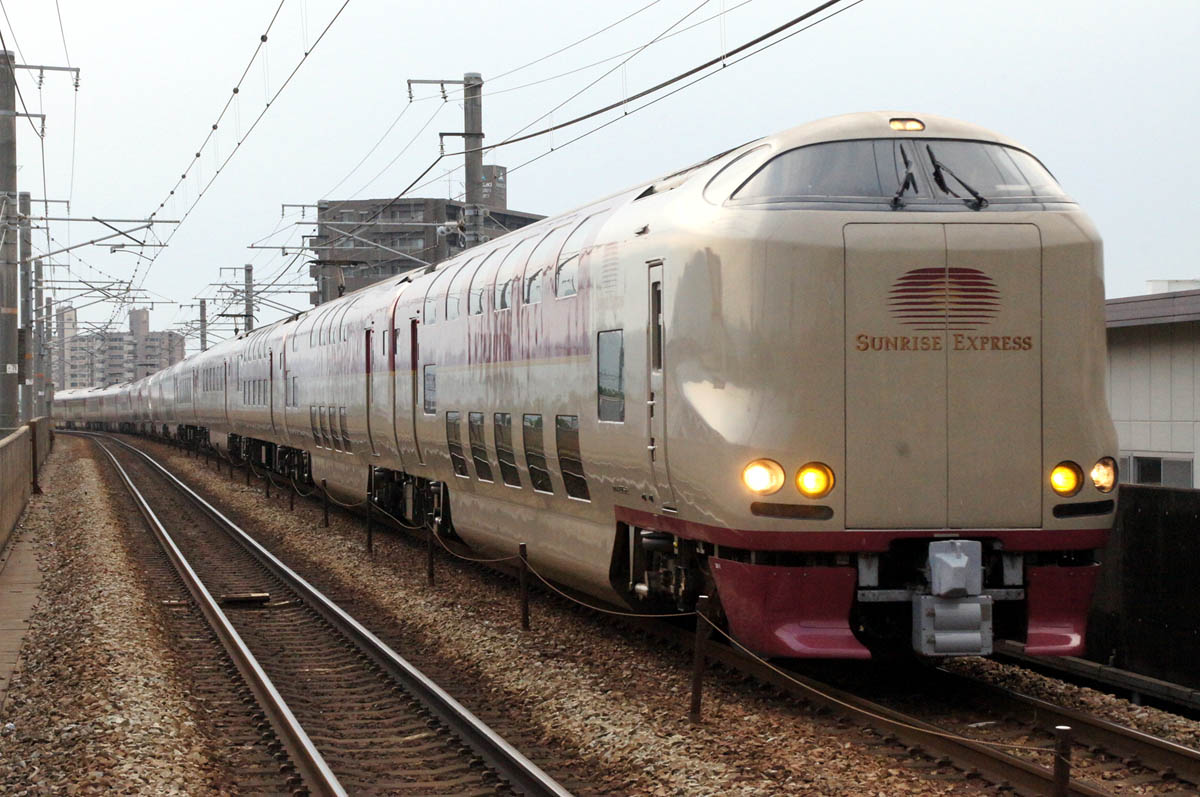
A Sunrise Seto & Sunrise Izumo combined formation on the Sanyo Main Line, May 2012

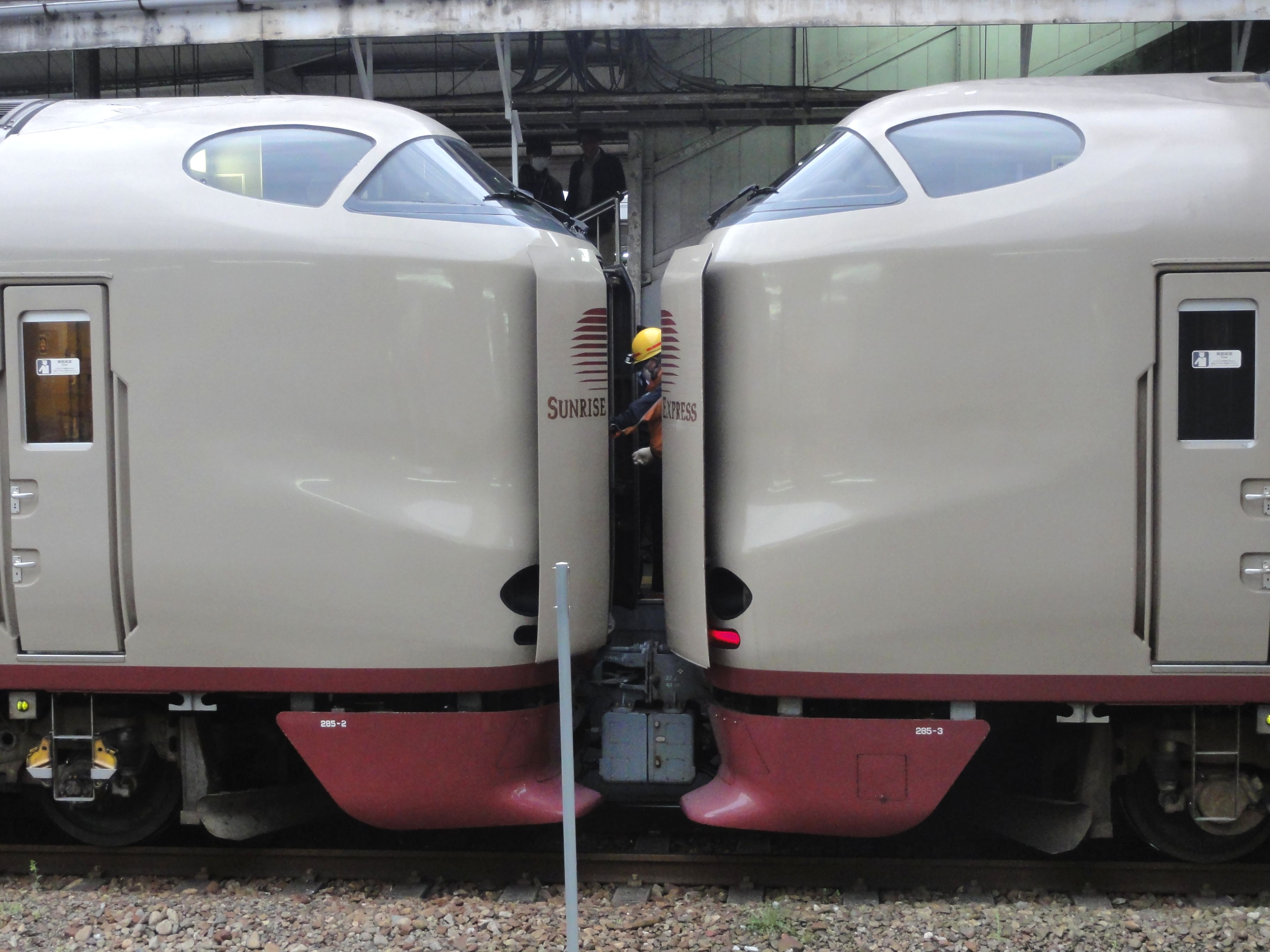
Sunrise Izumo and Sunrise Seto units being uncoupled at Okayama Station, March 2013

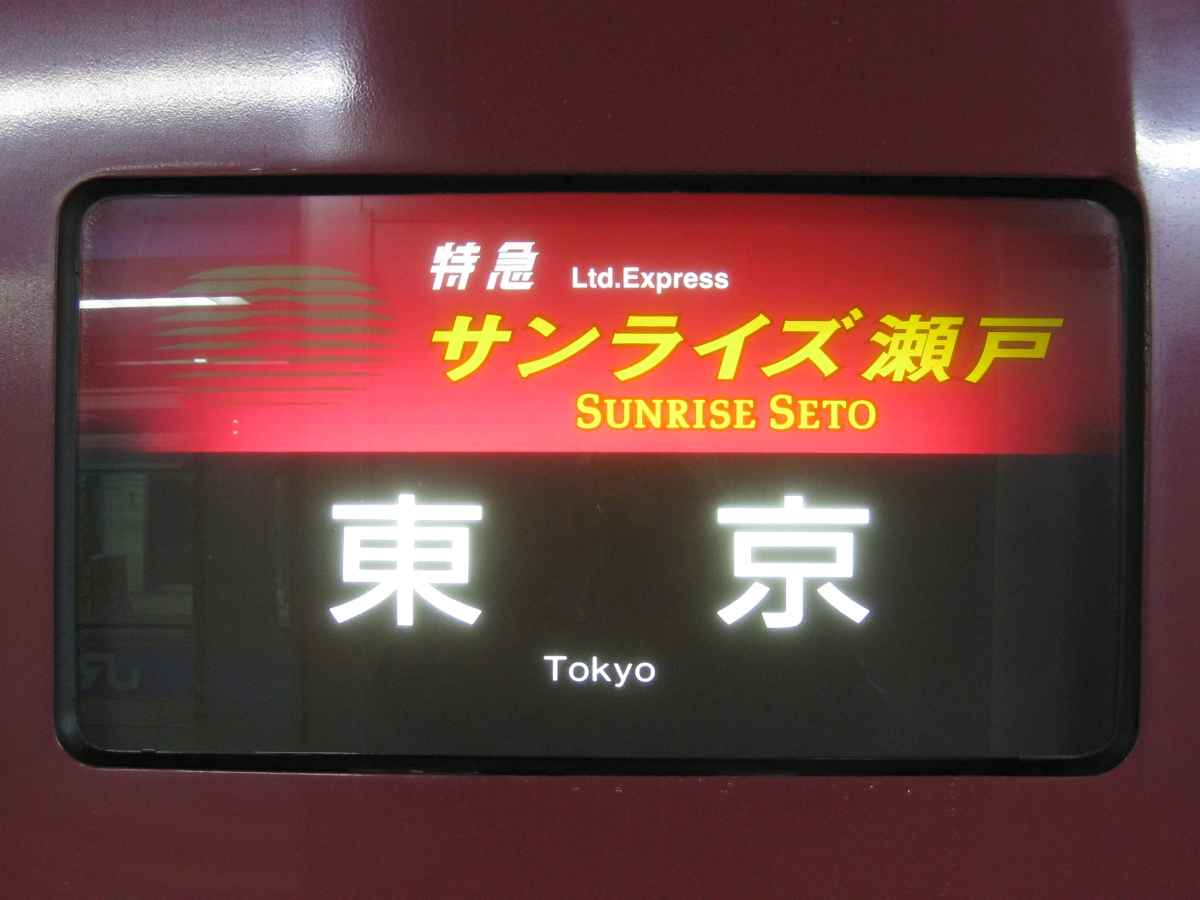
Destination indicator for a Tokyo-bound service

== Station list ==
Sunrise Seto trains also make brief stops at other stations for operational reasons, including crew changes at JR regional boundaries and meets with other trains. Passengers cannot board or alight from the train during these stops.

Regularly, eastbound services will operate between Atami and Yokohama via the Tōkaidō Freight Line, where trains enter the line at Odawara and exit at Chigasaki back to the Tōkaidō Main Line.

Line	Station	Distance in km	Departure time		Location	
Line	Station	Distance in km	Westbound (to Takamatsu)	Eastbound (to Tokyo)	Location	
Tōkaidō	Tokyo	0.0	21:26	07:08 arrival	Chiyoda	Tokyo
Tōkaidō	Yokohama	28.8	21:52	06:44	Yokohama	Kanagawa
Tōkaidō	Atami	104.6	22:57	05:43	Atami	Shizuoka
Tōkaidō	Numazu	126.2	23:16	05:25	Numazu	Shizuoka
Tōkaidō	Fuji	146.2	23:32	05:09	Fuji	Shizuoka
Tōkaidō	Shizuoka	180.2	23:59	04:38	Shizuoka	Shizuoka
Tōkaidō	Hamamatsu	257.1	00:54	↑	Hamamatsu	Shizuoka
Tōkaidō	Ōsaka	556.4	↓	00:33	Osaka	Osaka
Tōkaidō	Sannomiya	587.0	↓	00:11	Kobe	Hyogo
San'yō	Himeji	644.3	05:25	23:33	Himeji	Hyogo
San'yō	Okayama	732.9	06:27 arrival Decouple from Sunrise Izumo 06:31 departure	22:23 arrival Couple with Sunrise Izumo 22:34 departure	Okayama	Okayama
Uno / Honshi–Bisan	Okayama	732.9	06:27 arrival Decouple from Sunrise Izumo 06:31 departure	22:23 arrival Couple with Sunrise Izumo 22:34 departure	Okayama	Okayama
Uno / Honshi–Bisan	Kojima	760.7	06:52	22:01	Kurashiki	Okayama
Yosan	Sakaide	783.4	07:09	21:44	Sakaide	Kagawa
Yosan	Takamatsu	804.7	07:27 arrival	21:26	Takamatsu	Kagawa
Seasonal extended service
Yosan	Tadotsu	837.4	08:25	—N/a	Tadotsu	Kagawa
Dosan	Tadotsu	837.4	08:25	—N/a	Tadotsu	Kagawa
Dosan	Zentsūji	843.4	08:32	—N/a	Zentsuji	Kagawa
Dosan	Kotohira	848.7	08:39 arrival	—N/a	Kotohira	Kagawa

== Formation ==
Trains are formed of dedicated 7-car 285 series Sunrise Express electric multiple units (EMUs) owned by both JR Central and JR West.

When operating in the up (Tokyo-bound) direction, the cars are numbered 8 to 14 (cars 1 to 7 are the Sunrise Izumo), with car 14 at the Tokyo end. When operating in the down (Takamatsu-bound) direction, the cars are numbered 1 to 7, with car 7 at the Tokyo end.

Car No.	1/8	2/9	3/10	4/11	5/12	6/13	7/14
Numbering	KuHaNe 285	SaHaNe 285	MoHaNe 285	SaRoHaNe 285	MoHaNe 285	SaHaNe 285	KuHaNe 285
Upper-level accommodations	B single	B single	B solo	A single deluxe	B single / Nobi-nobi area	B single	B single
Lower-level accommodations	B single / B single twin	B single / B single twin	B solo	B sunrise twin	B single / Nobi-nobi area	B single / B single twin	B single / B single twin
Facilities			Lounge, vending machine, shower		Vending machine		

- Car 2/9 has a wheelchair-accessible compartment.
- Each car has toilet facilities.
- Smoking is permitted in cabins in car 6/13, and some compartments in car 4/11.

== Accommodation, ticketing and facilities ==
The Sunrise Express services consist of six types of accommodation. There are five types of berths: A single deluxe, B sunrise twin (2-person use), B single twin (1- or 2-person use), B single and B solo. There is also a carpeted sleeping space called the Nobi-nobi sleeping area.

The train has a maximum capacity of 158 people across 146 cabins (assuming all berths are booked), as follows:

Accommodation Capacity of the Sunrise Seto
Accommodation	Cabins	Max. Occupancy	Total Passengers
B sunrise twin	4	2 people	8
B single twin	8	2 people	16
A single deluxe	6	1 person	6
B single	80	1 person	80
B solo	20	1 person	20
Nobi-nobi sleeping area	28	1 person	28

Several fares are required to travel on the train. All passengers must pay a basic fare (運賃, unchin) and a limited express surcharge (特急料金, tokkyū ryōkin) which is based on the distance traveled and varies seasonally.

Passengers using a private room must also pay a berth fee (寝台料金, shindai ryōkin), while those using the Nobi-nobi sleeping area must pay a seat reservation charge (座席指定料金, zaseki shitei ryōkin) to reserve an individual sleeping space.

Berth and seat reservation charges are fixed regardless of the distance traveled. "B sunrise twin" cabins are sold as a unit and require payment of the full berth fee and two limited express surcharges, even when occupied by only a single passenger.

Tickets can be purchased up to one month before departure at a Midori no Madoguchi. Holders of the Japan Rail Pass can reserve a Nobi-nobi space without an additional charge.

Accommodation Price Table
Accommodation	Price
B sunrise twin	¥15,400 for two people
B single twin	¥15,100 for two people; ¥9,600 for one person
A single deluxe	¥13,980 for one person
B single	¥7,700 for one person
B solo	¥6,600 for one person
Nobi-nobi sleeping area	¥530 for one person

A shower is located in car 3/10. Passengers using the single deluxe compartments receive a free shower card, while other passengers can purchase a six-minute shower card. The cards are not assigned to specific time slots, but only a limited quantity are available. Mini-lounge areas in car 3/10 has a bench and table with four seats on each side of the train. Drink vending machines are available in cars 3/10 and 5/12.

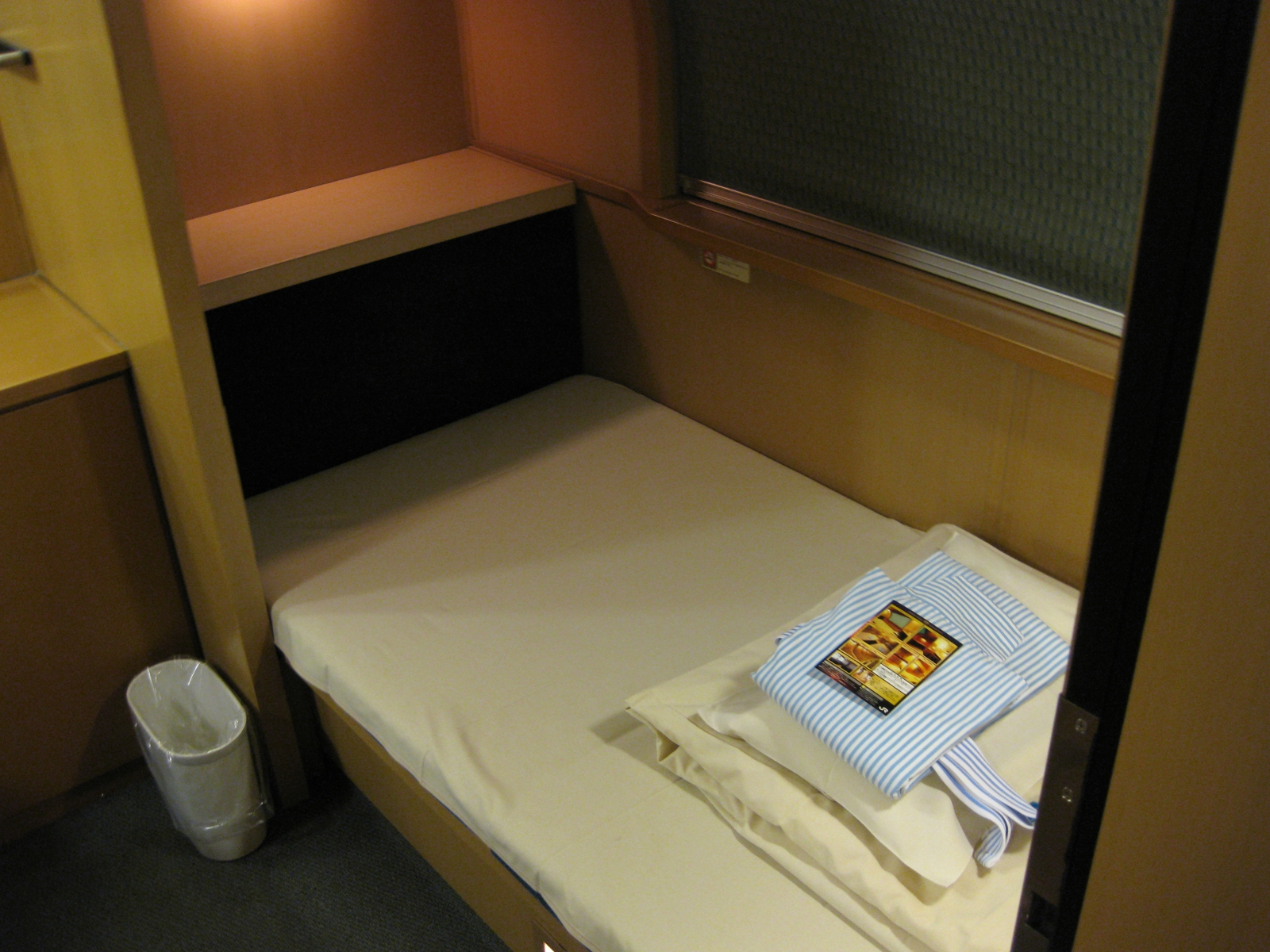
"A single deluxe" compartment

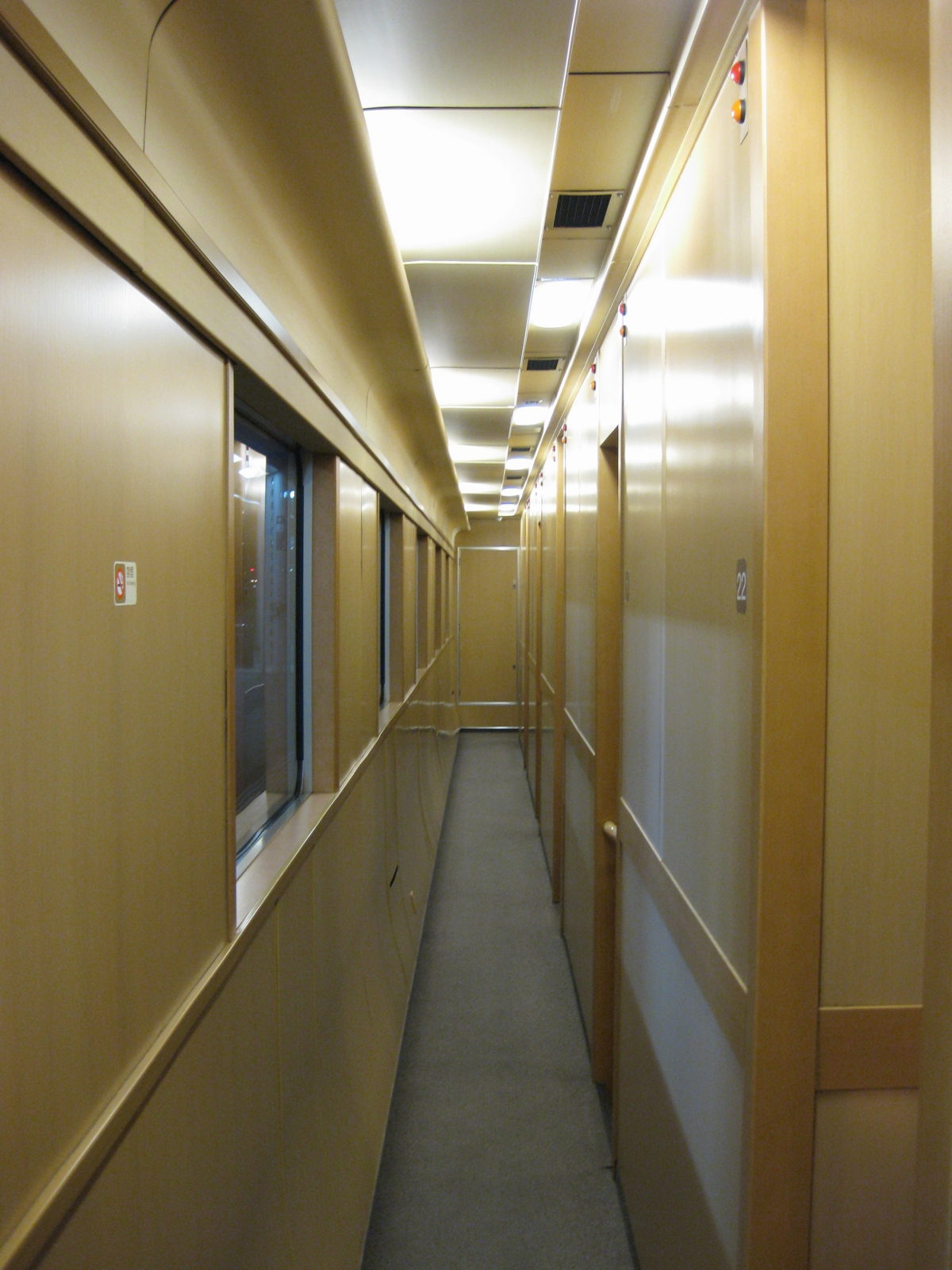
Car 4/11 corridor

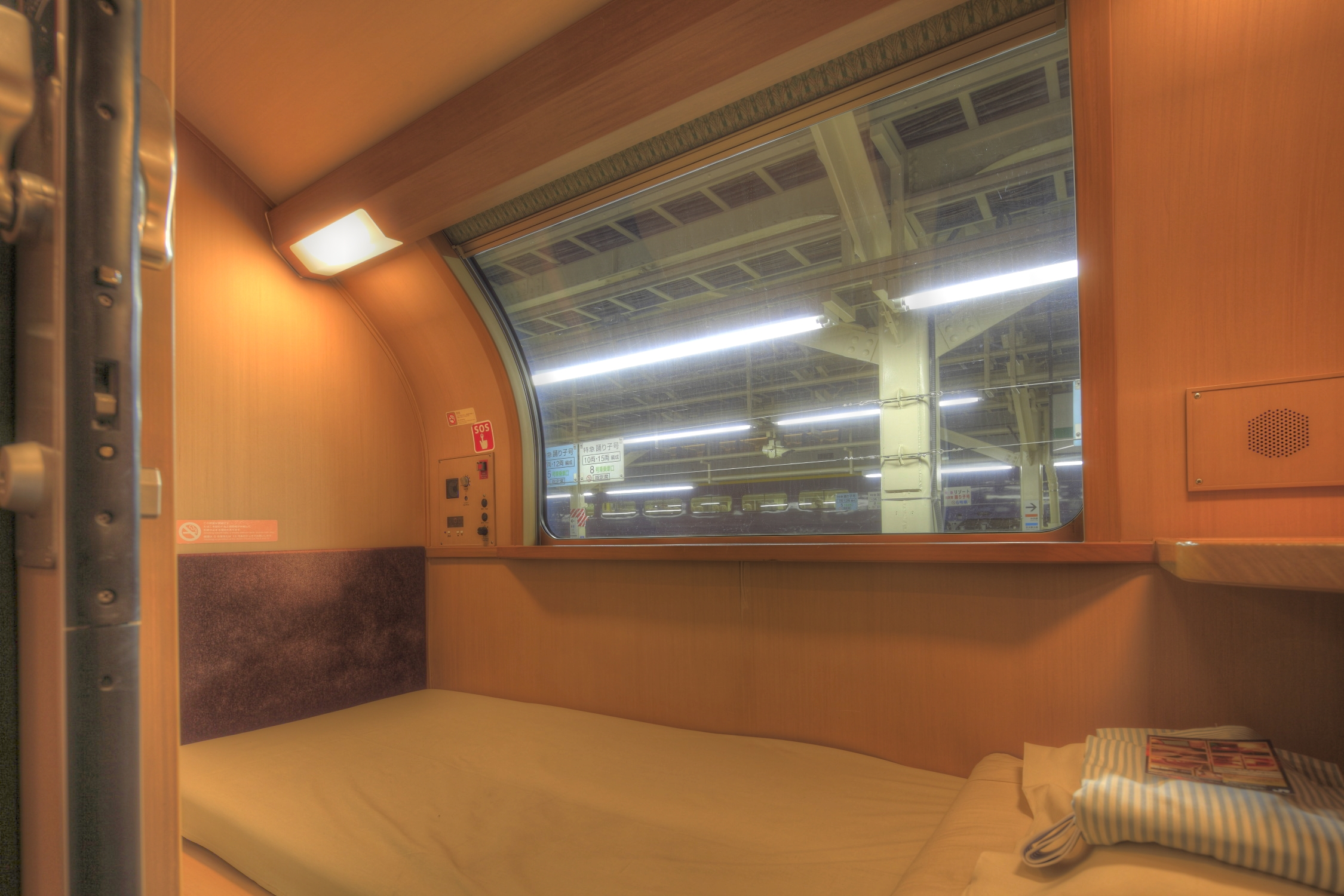
"B single" berth

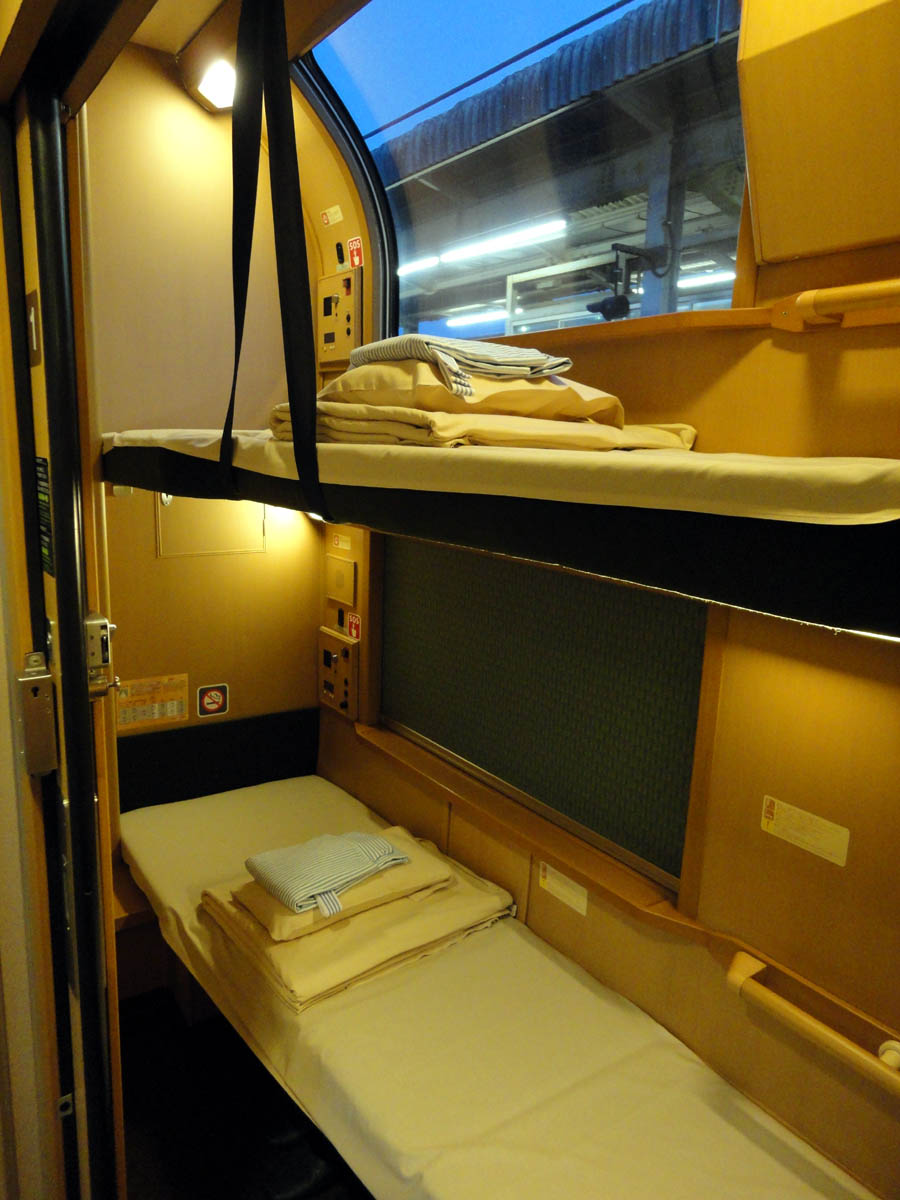
"B single twin" berth

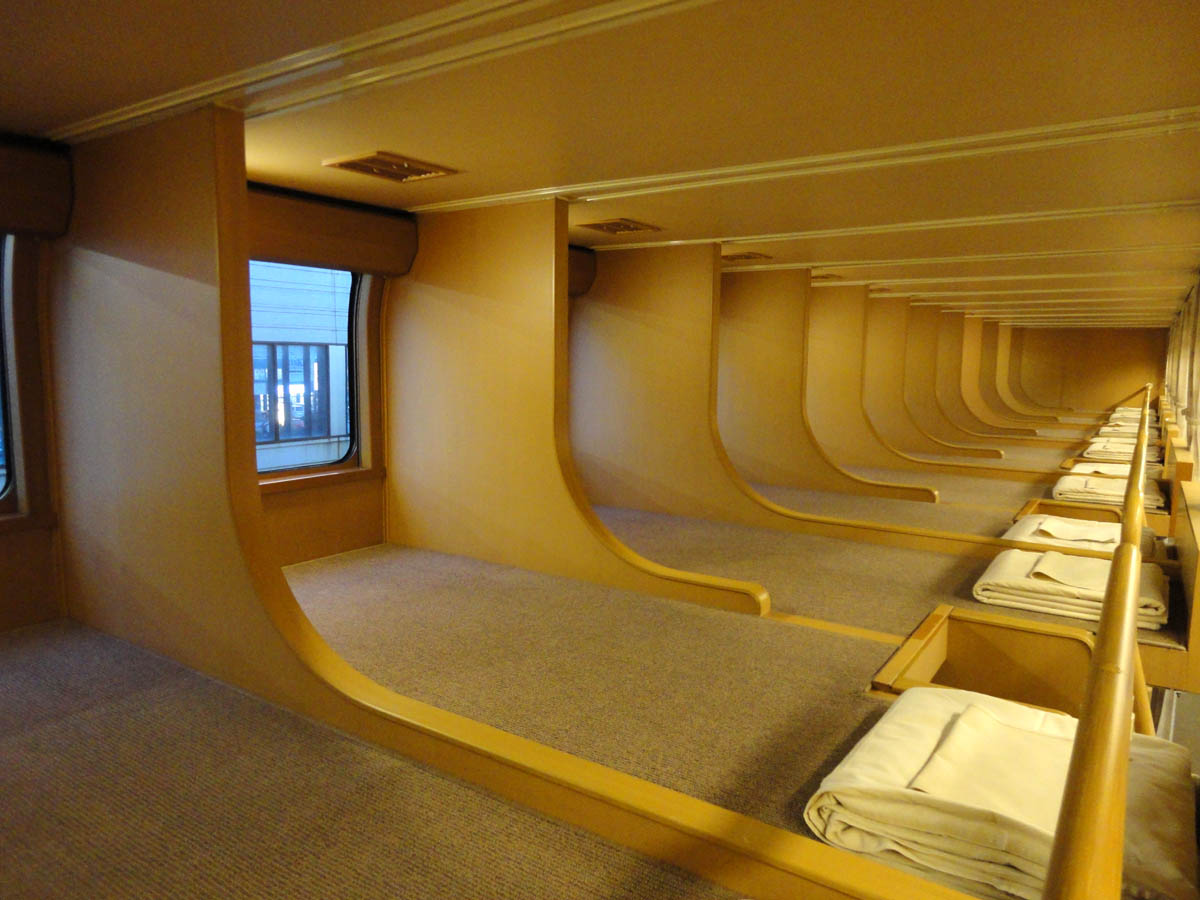
Nobi-nobi sleeping areas (car 5/12, upper floor)

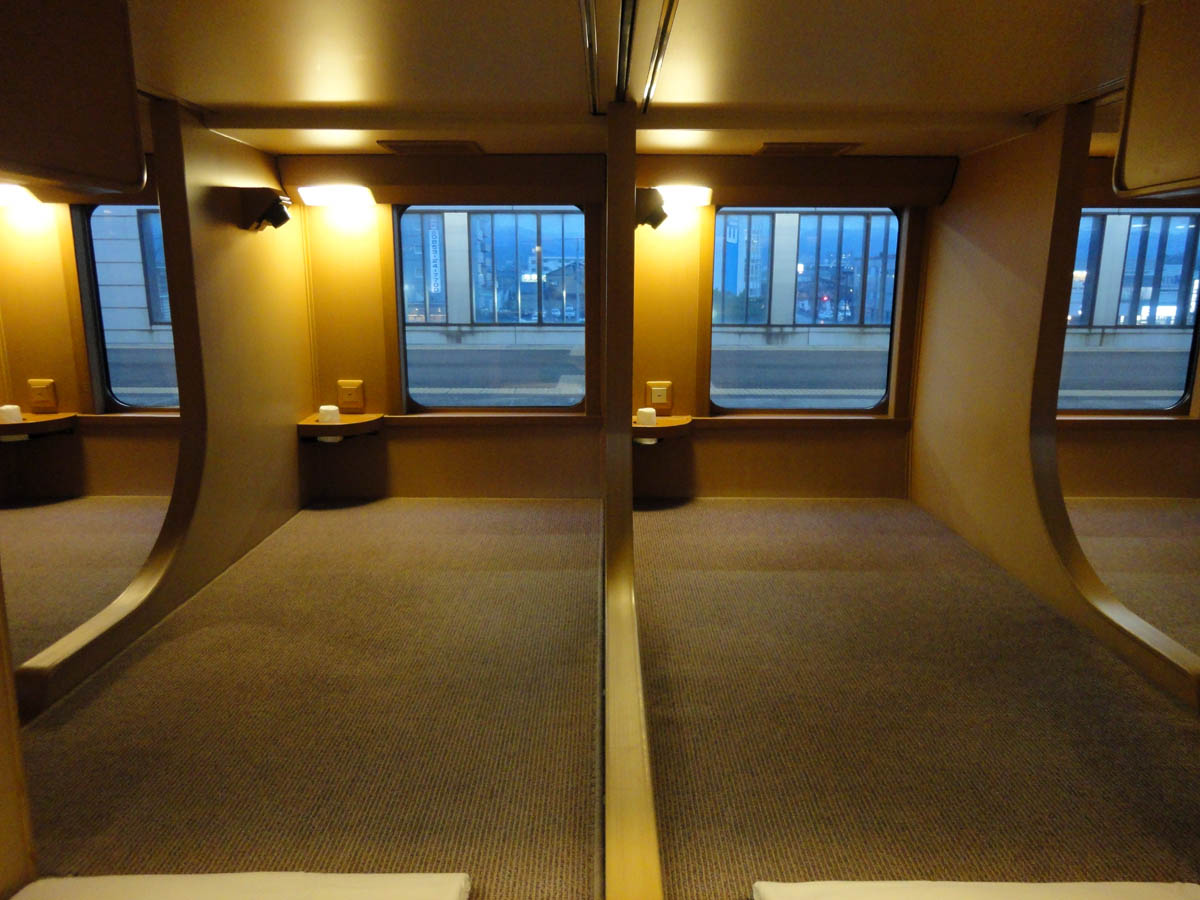
Nobi-nobi sleeping areas (car 5/12, lower floor)

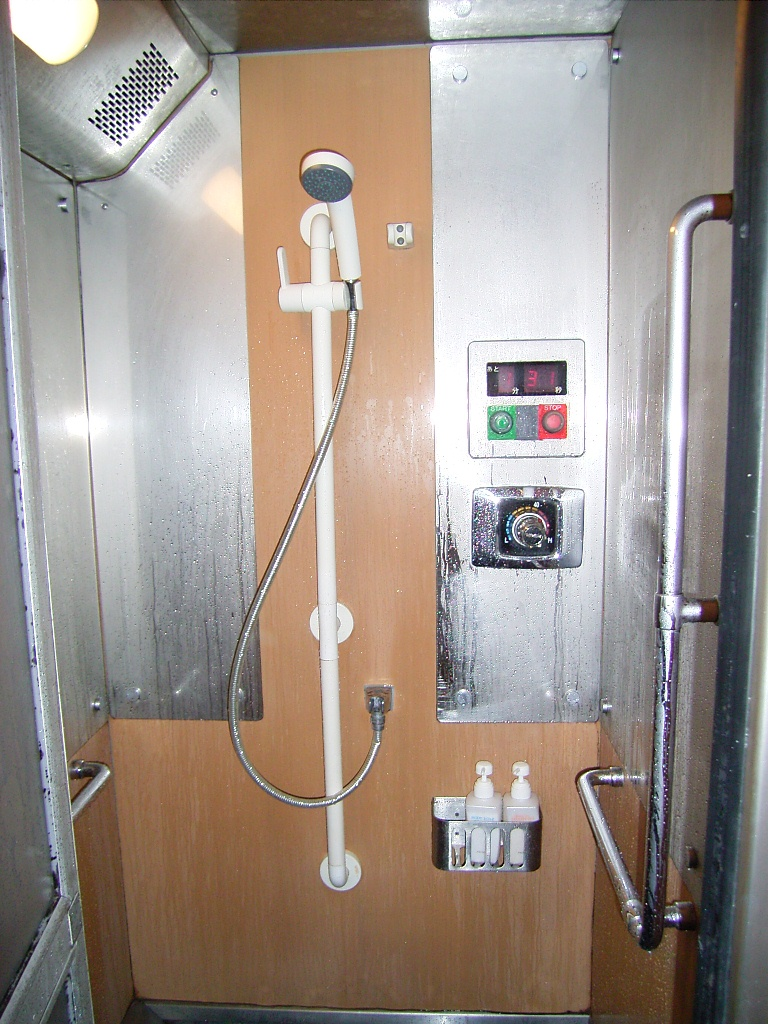
Shower (car 3/10)

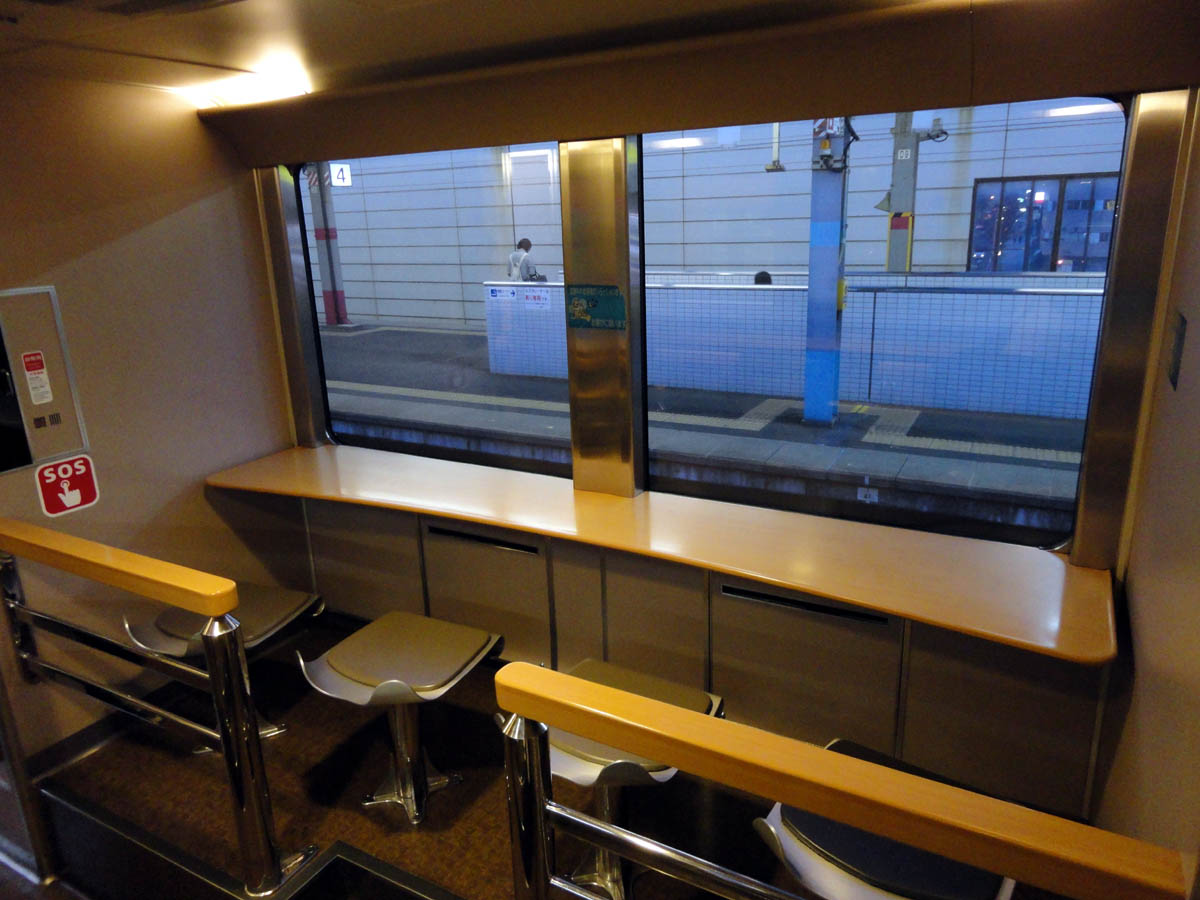
Lounge area (car 3/10)

== History ==
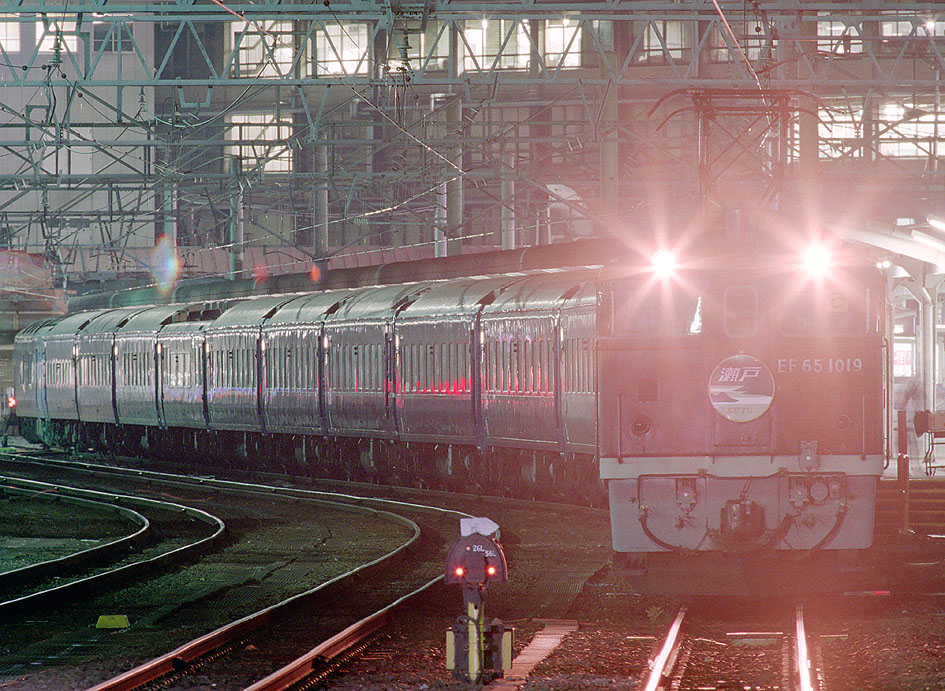
Locomotive-hauled Seto service, October 1995

The Sunrise Seto services were introduced together with the Sunrise Izumo on 10 July 1998. Previously, the Seto operated as a separate "Blue train" service connecting Tokyo with Takamatsu. The Sunrise Izumo was intended to attract more passengers to train transportation by introducing newly designed trains and by reducing the journey time.

Ridership on overnight trains in Japan continues to decline, and from March 2009, the Sunrise Izumo and Sunrise Seto became the only overnight sleeping car trains to operate west of Tokyo via the Tokaido Line.

From the start of the revised timetable on 12 March 2021, the departure time of the Sunrise Izumo and Sunrise Seto from Tokyo was changed from 10:00 PM to 9:50 PM. It is the first time that the departure time was changed since the services' introduction in 1998. The change cleared the 10:00 PM departure slot for one of the new Shōnan limited express services to Odawara.

== See also ==
- Sunrise Izumo
- Seto (train), the blue train predecessor to the Sunrise Seto
- List of named passenger trains of Japan
