= WLGM-LP =

- Edgewater, Florida; United States
- Frequency: 93.9 MHz

Programming
- Format: Religious

Ownership
- Owner: Edgewater Alliance Church

History
- First air date: 2014-04-30
- Former frequencies: 95.3 MHz (2003–2013); 95.1 MHz (2013–2014)

Technical information
- Licensing authority: FCC
- Facility ID: 134638
- Class: L1
- ERP: 100 watts
- HAAT: 29.9 meters (98 ft)
- Transmitter coordinates: 28°54′57.96″N 80°52′9.19″W
- Repeater: 102.3 W272DH (New Smyrna Beach)

Links
- Public license information: LMS

WLGM-LP (93.9 FM) is a radio station broadcasting a Religious music format. Licensed to Edgewater, Florida, United States, the station is currently owned by Edgewater Alliance Church.
