= WCEZ =

- Carthage, Illinois; United States
- Broadcast area: Keokuk, Iowa
- Frequency: 93.9 MHz
- Branding: Z 93.9

Programming
- Format: Classic rock

Ownership
- Owner: Leah Jones & Michael Greenwald; (Keokuk Broadcasting Inc)
- Sister stations: KOKX

History
- First air date: 2001

Technical information
- Licensing authority: FCC
- Facility ID: 79019
- Class: A
- ERP: 6,000 watts
- HAAT: 100 meters (330 ft)
- Transmitter coordinates: 40°24′54.0″N 91°15′11.0″W

Links
- Public license information: Public file; LMS
- Webcast: Listen live
- Website: radiokeokuk.com

WCEZ (93.9 FM, "Z93") is a classic rock formatted broadcast radio station licensed to Carthage, Illinois, serving the Keokuk Area. WCEZ is owned and operated by Michael Greenwald and Leah Jones, Keokuk Broadcasting Inc. The station highlights local music Sunday evenings, is an affiliate of the Iowa Hawkeyes, syndicated Nights With Alice Cooper and, syndicated Pink Floyd show "Floydian Slip." The station plays Rock music from the 70's through today.
