= WRWK-LP =

- Midlothian, Virginia; United States
- Frequency: 93.9 MHz
- Branding: TheWorkFM 93.9

Programming
- Format: Variety
- Affiliations: Pacifica Radio Network

Ownership
- Owner: Synergy Project, Inc.

Technical information
- Licensing authority: FCC
- Facility ID: 197068
- Class: LP1
- ERP: 27 watts
- HAAT: 51 metres (167 ft)
- Transmitter coordinates: 37°30′14.9″N 77°36′50.8″W

Links
- Public license information: LMS
- Webcast: Listen live
- Website: theworkfm.org

WRWK-LP (93.9 FM, "TheWorkFM 93.9") is a radio station licensed to serve the community of Midlothian, Virginia. The station is owned by Synergy Project, Inc., and airs a variety format.

The station was assigned the WRWK-LP call letters by the Federal Communications Commission on July 14, 2016.
