= KETO-LP =

Coordinates: 39°43′55″N 104°51′4″W

- Aurora, Colorado; United States
- Broadcast area: Denver, Colorado
- Frequency: 93.9 MHz
- Branding: KETO 93.9 FM

Programming
- Format: International

Ownership
- Owner: Ethiopian Community Television

History
- First air date: 2017

Technical information
- Licensing authority: FCC
- Facility ID: 192127
- ERP: 100 watts
- HAAT: 30 meters (98 ft)

Links
- Public license information: LMS
- Website: ketofm.org

KETO-LP (93.9 FM) is a low-power FM radio station branded as "KETO 93.9 FM". The station is operated by Ethiopian Community Television broadcasting an international multicultural FM music/News and Podcasts format. This station is licensed to Aurora, Colorado and is broadcasting to the Denver, Colorado area.
