= CIEL-FM =

Radio station in Rivière-du-Loup, Quebec

Coordinates: 47°34′56″N 69°22′17″W

- Rivière-du-Loup, Quebec; Canada
- Broadcast area: Rivière-du-Loup, Témiscouata-sur-le-Lac, Pohénégamook
- Frequency: 103.7 MHz
- Branding: CIEL

Programming
- Language: French
- Format: Adult contemporary

Ownership
- Owner: Groupe Radio Simard; (Radio CJFP (1986) ltée)
- Sister stations: CIBM-FM

History
- First air date: April 13, 1947
- Former call signs: CJFP (1947–2001)
- Former frequencies: 1400 kHz (1947–1995)
- Call sign meaning: "Ciel" means "sky" in French

Technical information
- Class: C
- ERP: 60,000 watts
- HAAT: 320.5 metres (1,052 ft)

Links
- Website: ciel103.com

CIEL-FM is a French-language Canadian radio station located in Rivière-du-Loup, Quebec.

Owned and operated by Radio CJFP (1986) ltée (part of the Groupe Radio Simard), it broadcasts on 103.7 MHz with an effective radiated power of 60,000 watts using an omnidirectional antenna (class C). The station has an adult contemporary format under the CIEL branding. However, the station has some oldies programming, during weekends.

The station was originally known as CJFP and went on the air on April 13, 1947, as an AM station broadcasting on 1400 kHz. From 1984 until the station's move to FM in 1994, it was one of the few AM stations authorized to increase its power at night, due to NARBA amendments which authorized all stations on "graveyard" (class C) channels to quadruple their nighttime power. CJFP actually became the most powerful station in all of North America among those stations, as it was authorized to broadcast with 10,000 watts during the day and 20,000 watts (directional) at night; however, this did not actually result in good coverage at night due to massive co-channel interference. The FM signal went on the air on December 15, 1994 and the AM signal went off the air in June 1995.

Because the station already had an FM sister station, namely CIBM-FM (at the time, Canadian Radio-television and Telecommunications Commission (CRTC) regulations generally forbade broadcasters to operate more than one AM station and one FM station per market), CJFP-FM originally operated under a condition of licence which required at least half of the programming to be "spoken-word programming" (i.e., talk). As such, CJFP-FM became the first privately owned French-language FM station to broadcast mainly talk programming; most of that talk programming came from the Radiomédia network. The station abandoned most of its talk programming, adopting a full-time adult contemporary format, and changed its call sign to CIEL-FM, effective September 1, 2001. That call sign was used, until August 2000, on a Montreal-area station now known as CHMP-FM, which coincidentally now has a talk format.

== Transmitters ==
Rebroadcasters of CIEL-FM
City of licence	Identifier	Frequency	Power	Class	RECNet	CRTC Decision
Témiscouata-sur-le-Lac	CIEL-FM-3	98.3 FM	50 watts	LP	Query	
Rivière-du-Loup	CIEL-FM-1	93.9 FM	50 watts	LP	Query	85-8
Pohénégamook	CIEL-FM-5	93.5 FM	45 watts	LP	Query	

CIEL-FM-1 went on the air when CJFP moved to FM. CIEL-FM-3 replaced CJAF in 1996, and CIEL-FM-5 went on the air in 2001. Another rebroadcaster, CHRT 1450 in Pohénégamook, was shut down when the station's main FM signal was implemented.

There is a station in Trois-Pistoles which uses the call sign CIEL-FM-4 (formerly CJTF-FM), but since 1997 it is no longer a rebroadcaster of CIEL.
