= Media in Montreal =

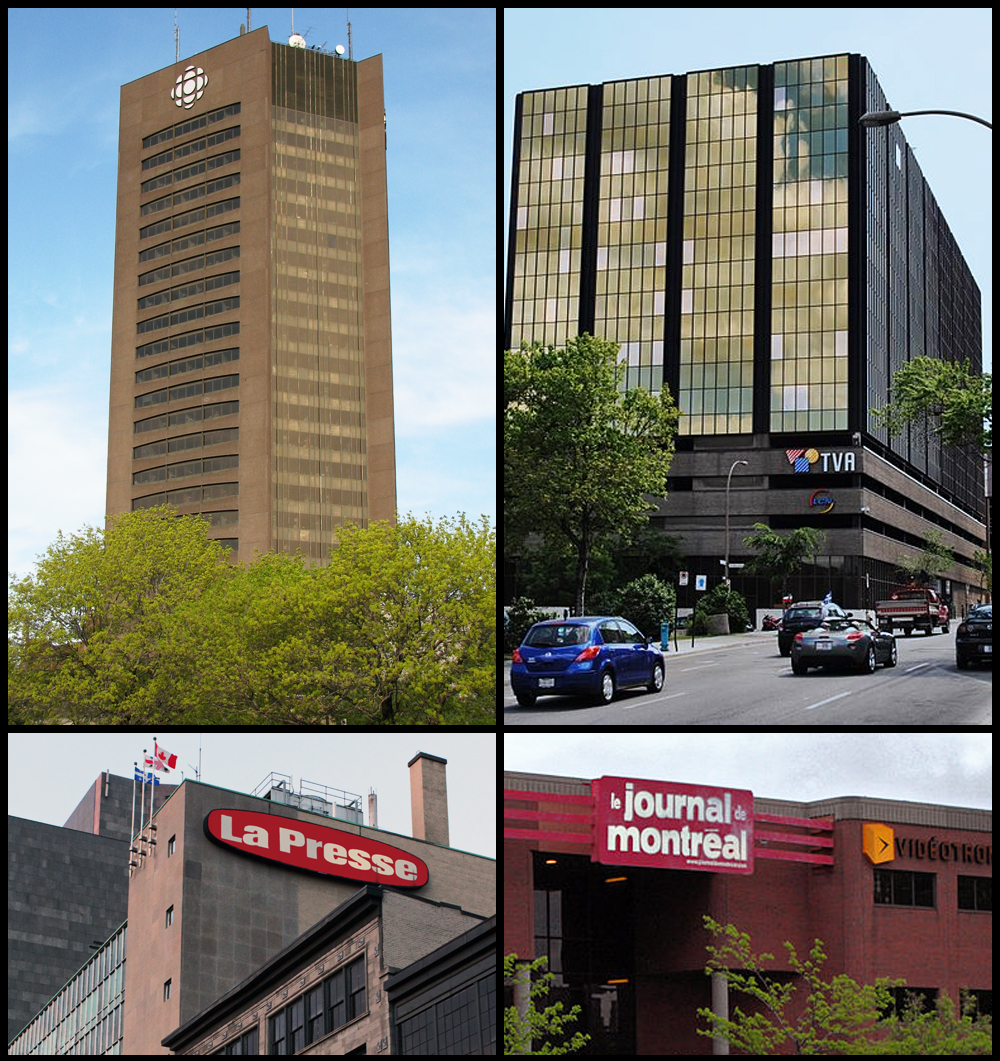
The Montreal buildings belonging to CBC/Radio-Canada, TVA, La Presse and Le Journal de Montréal

Montreal has a well-developed communications system, including several English and French language television stations, newspapers, radio stations, and magazines. It is Canada's second-largest media market, and by far the largest in francophone Canada. It is the centre of the country's francophone media industry.

== Television stations ==
OTA virtual channel (PSIP)	Actual channel	Vidéotron Cable	Call sign	Network	Lang.	Notes
2.1	19 (UHF)	2	CBFT-DT	Ici Radio-Canada Télé	FR	
6.1	21 (UHF)	6	CBMT-DT	CBC Television	EN	
10.1	10 (VHF)	4	CFTM-DT	TVA	FR	
12.1	12 (VHF)	11	CFCF-DT	CTV	EN	
15.1	15 (UHF)	8	CKMI-DT	Global	EN	
17.1	26 (UHF)	3	CIVM-DT	Télé-Québec	FR	
29.1	29 (UHF)	22	CFTU-DT	Educational independent	FR	Branded on-air as "savoir.tv"
35.1	35 (UHF)	5	CFJP-DT	Noovo	FR	
47.1	31 (UHF)	16	CFHD-DT	Multicultural independent	Multi	Branded on-air as "ICI Montreal"; secondary affiliate of Omni Television
62.1	17 (UHF)	14	CJNT-DT	Citytv	EN	

Canada's major French-language networks are all headquartered within a few blocks of each other on Boulevard René-Lévesque in downtown Montreal.

Network programming from the United States is provided on cable via stations from the Burlington, Vermont/Plattsburgh, New York market; see Template:Champlain Valley TV. Several Burlington/Plattsburgh stations can be received over the air in Montreal, including: WPTZ (NBC), WVNY (ABC), WCAX (CBS), WFFF (FOX), WETK (PBS) and WCFE (PBS). Montreal is ten times larger than the entire American population of the Burlington/Plattsburgh market; indeed, for decades most stations in that market before CRTC regulations and growth in the region itself identified as serving "Burlington/Plattsburgh/Montreal," and depended on advertising in Montreal for their survival.

== Daily newspapers ==
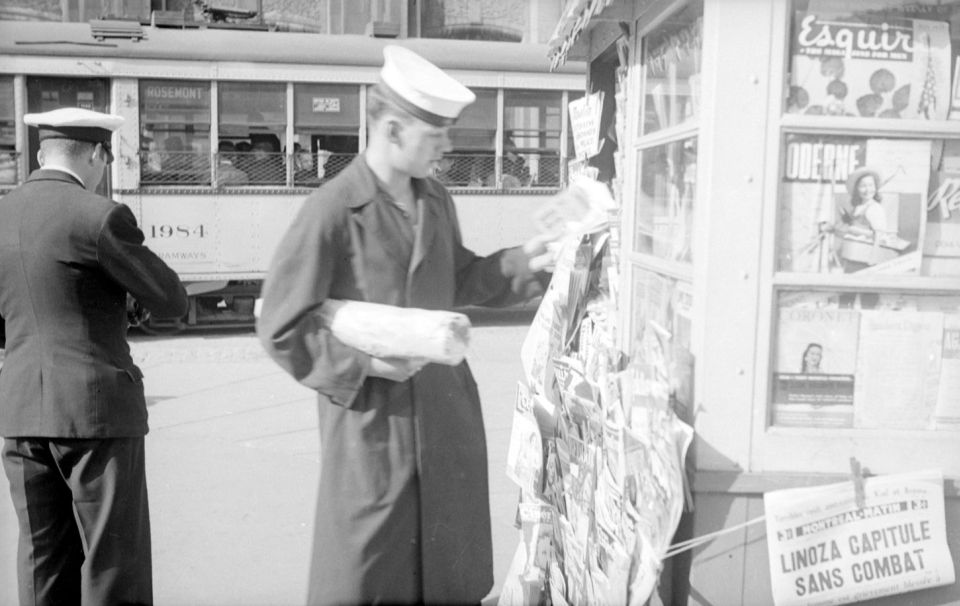
Newsstand in Rosemont, Montreal, 1943.

- Le Devoir (French)
- Montreal Gazette (English)
- Le Journal de Montréal (French)
- La Presse (French)

== Free daily newspapers ==
- 24H (French)
- Métro (French)

== Weekly newspapers ==
Also known as "alternative" or "cultural" weeklies:

- African Reflection (English)
- Avenir de l'est (French)
- Brossard Journal (English, French)
- Cités Nouvelles (French)
- Courrier Ahuntsic & Bordeaux-Cartierville (French)
- Cult MTL (English)
- East End Suburban (English)
- Exclaim! (English) (National: Canadian monthly)
- Guide Montréal-Nord (French)
- Ici (French)
- Journal de Rosemont - La Petite-Patrie (French)
- Journal de St-Michel (French)
- L'Express d'Outremont & Mont-Royal (French)
- L'Informateur de Rivière-des-Prairies (French)
- La Voix Pop (French)
- Le Flambeau de l'Est (French)
- Le Magazine de L'île des Soeurs (French)
- Le Messager Lachine & Dorval (French)
- Le Messager LaSalle (French)
- Le Messager Verdun (French)
- Le Messager Week-End (French, monthly)
- Le Plateau (French)
- Le Québécois Libre (French)
- Matin (French)
- Montréal Express (French, web only)
- Montreal Times (English)
- Nouvelles Hochelaga-Maisonneuve (French)
- Nouvelles Park-Extension News (English, French)
- Nouvelles Saint-Laurent News (French, English)
- Place Publique (English, French)
- Progrès Saint-Léonard (French)
- Progrès Villeray - Parc-Extension (French)
- St-Lambert Journal (English, French)
- The Eastern Door (English)
- The Free Press (English)
- The Montreal Tribune (English)
- The Montrealer (English)
- The Senior Times (English)
- The Suburban (English)
- Voir (French)
- West End Times (English)
- West Island Gazette (English)
- West Island Life (English)
- Westmount Independent (English)
- Westmount Life (English)

== Campus newspapers ==
=== Student newspapers ===
- McGill Tribune (English, McGill University)
- The Bull & Bear (English, McGill University)
- The Concordian (English, Concordia University)
- Le Délit français (French, McGill University)
- L'intérêt (French, HEC Montréal)
- The Link (English, Concordia University)
- The McGill Daily (English, McGill University)
- McGill International Review (MIR) (Bilingual, McGill University)
- Montréal Campus (French, Université du Québec à Montréal)
- Le Polyscope (French, Polytechnique Montréal)
- Quartier Libre (French, Université de Montréal)
- The Plant, (English, Dawson College)

=== University newspapers ===
- Le Forum (French, Université de Montréal)
- McGill Reporter (English, McGill University)

== Ethnic newspapers ==
- BHMA (Greek)
- Canadian Jewish News (English, Jewish)
- Corriere Italiano (Italian)
- Das Echo (German)
- Golos Obszhini (Russian)
- Hafteh (Persian)
- Horizon Weekly (Armenian)
- Humsafar Times (English, Punjabi)
- Medad (Afghan And Iranian community) (Persian)
- Montreal Community Contact (English, Black, Caribbean)
- The Montreal Greek Times (Greek)
- Phoenicia (Arabic, English, French)
- Polski Bulletin (Polish)
- Sada Al-Mashrek (Arabic, English, French)
- Știri de Montreal (Romanian)
- Ta Nea (Greek)

== Defunct newspapers ==
- Hudson Gazette (English)
- The Monitor (English)
- Montreal Mirror (English)
- Montreal Star (English)
- West Island Chronicle (English)
- Westmount Examiner (English)

== Magazines (independent from newspapers) ==
See also magazines published in Montreal.

- Art/iculation (English, French)
- Cult MTL (English)
- Maisonneuve (English)
- mauditsfrancais.ca (French)
- Panoram Italia (English, French, Italian)
- Journaldesvoisins.com (French)

== Radio stations ==
AM/FM stations

Band	Frequency	Callsign	Station name	Language	Format	Notes
FM	88.1 MHz	CHDO-FM		French/English	Trudeau Airport information (Originally on 89.7 FM)	
FM	88.5 MHz	CBME-FM	CBC Radio One	English	public news/talk	
FM	89.3 MHz	CISM-FM	CISM	French	campus (Université de Montréal)	
FM	89.9 MHz	CKKI-FM	89.9 Kic Country Montreal	English/Mohawk	country (Kahnawake Mohawk Territory)	
FM	90.3 MHz	CKUT-FM	CKUT	English	campus (McGill)	
FM	90.7 MHz	CHIL-FM	Centre communautaire "Bon Courage" de Place Benoît	French	Community radio (borough of Saint-Laurent)	
FM	91.3 MHz	CIRA-FM	Radio Ville-Marie	French	religious (Catholic)	
FM	91.9 MHz	CKLX-FM	BPM Sports 91.9 Montreal	French	sports talk	
FM	92.5 MHz	CKBE-FM	The Beat 92.5	English	rhythmic adult contemporary	
FM	93.5 MHz	CBM-FM	CBC Music	English	public music	
FM	94.3 MHz	CKMF-FM	Énergie	French	mainstream rock	
FM	95.1 MHz	CBF-FM	Ici Radio-Canada Première	French	public news/talk	
FM	95.9 MHz	CJFM-FM	Virgin Radio 95.9	English	contemporary hit radio	
FM	96.9 MHz	CKOI-FM	CKOI	French	contemporary hit radio	
FM	97.7 MHz	CHOM-FM	CHOM 97.7	English	mainstream rock	
FM	98.5 MHz	CHMP-FM	98,5 FM	French	news/talk	
FM	99.5 MHz	CJPX-FM	99.5 Montréal	French	news/talk (Qub Radio)/mainstream rock	
FM	100.1 MHz	CKVL-FM	FM 100,1 Radio LaSalle	French	community radio (LaSalle)	
FM	100.7 MHz	CBFX-FM	Ici Musique	French	public music	
FM	101.5 MHz	CIBL-FM	CIBL 101,5 Radio-Montréal	French	community radio	
FM	102.3 MHz	CINQ-FM	Radio Centre-Ville	English, French, Multiple	multilingual	
FM	102.9 MHz	CILO-FM	Time FM	English, French, Multiple	multilingual (South Asian)	
FM	103.3 MHz	CHAA-FM	FM 103,3	French	community radio (Longueuil)	
FM	103.7 MHz	CKRK-FM	K103 Radio Kahnawake	English	community radio (Kahnawake Mohawk Territory)	
FM	104.5 MHz	CHOU-FM-1	Radio Moyen-Orient	Arabic (several dialects)	multilingual	repeater of CHOU 1450 AM, serving Montreal on the FM band
FM	104.7 MHz	CBME-FM-1	CBC Radio One	English	repeater of CBME-FM, serving Notre-Dame-de-Grâce	
FM	105.1 MHz	CKDG-FM	Mike FM	English, Greek	multilingual, community radio, classic hits	
FM	105.7 MHz	CFGL-FM	Rythme FM 105.7	French	Soft adult contemporary	
FM	106.3 MHz	CKIN-FM	Radio CINA FM Montréal	Arabic	multilingual	
FM	107.3 MHz	CITE-FM	107,3 Rouge FM	French	adult contemporary	
AM	600 kHz	CFQR		English	Testing, with programming to begin late 2017; to be talk radio	
AM	690 kHz	CKGM	TSN Radio 690	English	sports	
AM	730 kHz	CKAC	Radio Circulation 730	French	traffic info	
AM	800 kHz	CJAD	CJAD 800	English	news/talk, sports, oldies	
AM	940 kHz	CFNV	AM 940 La Superstation	French		
AM	1280 kHz	CFMB	CFMB Radio Montreal	Multiple	multilingual	
AM	1410 kHz	CJWI	CPAM Radio Union	French (also some Creole)	multilingual	
AM	1450 kHz	CHOU	Radio Moyen-Orient	Arabic (several dialects)	multilingual community radio	
AM	1570 kHz	CJLV	Radio Laval 1570 AM	French	oldies	
AM	1610 kHz	CHRN	Radio Humsafar	English, French, Multiple	multilingual (South Asian)	
AM	1650 kHz	CKZW	La Radio Gospel	English, French	Christian programming	
AM	1690 kHz	CJLO	1690 CJLO	English	campus (Concordia University)	

=== Internet radio stations ===
Frequency	Call sign	Branding	Language	Format	External links	Notes
Internet only		99.9 The Beat	English	Urban Contemporary	https://sites.google.com/view/thebeatmtl/home	
Internet only		CHOC.ca	French	Campus radio (Université du Québec à Montréal)	https://www.choq.ca/	
Internet only		CJRS Montreal	French	Oldies	https://www.cjrsradio.com/	
Internet only		DJRADIO.ca	French	90s, 2000s, 2010 and today's hits	https://www.djradio.ca/	
Internet only		Genese Fondation	French, Hatian creole	Christian	https://fondationgenese.org/gf-radio/	
Internet only		Magic FM	English	Classic rock	https://magicfmmontreal.ca/	
Internet only		Montreal Greek Radio		Greek community radio	https://tunein.com/radio/Montreal-Greek-Radio-s148247/	
Internet only		ICI Radio Atmosphere	French	Ambient music	https://ici.radio-canada.ca/ohdio/musique-atmosphere	Serving provincial wide
Internet only		ICI Radio Classique	French	Classical radio	https://ici.radio-canada.ca/ohdio/musique-classique	It could be listened through 95.1 FM-HD2
Internet only		ICI Radio Hip hop	French	Urban Contemporary	https://ici.radio-canada.ca/ohdio/musique-hip-hop	Serving provincial wide
Internet only		ICI Radio Rock	French	Rock	https://ici.radio-canada.ca/ohdio/musique-rock	Serving provincial wide
Internet only		La Face B	French	Indie/Variety	https://www.lepnpradioshow.com/	
Internet only		LePNPradioshow	French	Oldies	https://www.lepnpradioshow.com/	
Internet only		Le Rapologue	French	Urban Contemporary	https://www.lerapologue.com/	
Internet only		N10.AS	English	Indie/Variety	https://n10.as/	
Internet only		KracRadio	French	Indie/Variety	https://kracradio.com/	WorldWide
Internet only		RADIOAZUL.INTERNATIONAL	Multilingual	Multilingual	https://radioazul.international/fr	
Internet only		Radio Bloc Oral	French	Experimental music	https://www.radioblocoral.ca/	
Internet only		RADIO LP WEB	French	Country/Rock	https://radiolpweb.com/	
Internet only		Radio Montana QC	French	Country	https://www.radio-rmqc.com/Montana/	
Internet only		Smooth Motion FM	English	Smooth Jazz/Urban AC	https://motionfm.com/player/listen-smooth.html	
Internet only		Sawl et Rab	Arabic, French	Christian	https://motionfm.com/player/listen-smooth.html	
Internet only		Techno FM	English	Dance/EDM	https://techno.fm/	
Internet only		Teerex Radio Teerex	English, French	Smooth Jazz/Rhythmic AC	https://www.teerexradioteerex.com/	
Internet only		Qub Radio	French	Talk/News	https://www.qub.ca/?silent_auth=true	Affiliated with 99.5 FM, serving provincial wide

=== Foreign radio stations ===
A number of radio stations from New York and Vermont may be heard in Montreal, most notably WVMT 620 AM, WCHP 760 kHz, WEAV 960 AM, WEZF 92.9 FM, WQLR 94.7 FM, WBTZ 99.9 FM, and WVPS 107.9 FM. WQLR, while based in the United States, is focused on Montreal as a rimshotter. CFRA 580 AM from Ottawa is also clearly available in Montreal, as is CITE-FM-1 102.7 FM from Sherbrooke (a sister station of, but programmed separately from, CITE-FM).

==== United States ====
Frequency	Call sign	Branding	Format	Owner	Location	Notes
620 AM	WVMT	WVMT	Talk radio	Paul S. Goldman (Sison Broadcasting, Inc.)	Burlington, Vermont	
760 AM	WCHP	WCHP 760 AM	Christian radio	Champlain Radio, Inc.	Champlain, New York	
960 AM	WEAV	The Game	Sports	Vox AM/FM, LLC	Plattsburgh, New York	
92.9 FM	WEZF	Star 92.9	Adult contemporary	Vox AM/FM, LLC	Burlington, Vermont	
94.7 FM	WQLR	KLove	Contemporary Christian	Educational Media Foundation	Chateaugay, New York	
99.9 FM	WBTZ	The Buzz	Alternative rock	Hall Communications	Plattsburgh, New York	
107.9 FM	WVPS	Vermont Public	public radio	Vijay Singh	Burlington, Vermont	

Defunct stations

The Greater Montreal area had a number of radio stations that were shut down over the years.

- CHRF 980 AM
- CJMS 1040 AM

In 2013, the new local media firm Tietolman-Tétrault-Pancholy Media, whose partners included former Montreal City Councillor Nicolas Tétrault, received licenses to launch three new radio stations on the AM band: a French sports station on AM 850, an English talk radio station on AM 600, and a French talk radio station on AM 940. As of August 2016, the AM 850 license has lapsed unbuilt, with both of the other licenses due to expire in November if the stations have not launched by then.
