= 2014 Ontario municipal elections =

Canadian local elections

- October 27, 2014

3306 municipal seats in 444 municipalities
- Turnout: 43.12% (average) ▼1.23%

The 2014 municipal elections in Ontario were held on October 27, 2014.

Voters in the province of Ontario elected mayors, councillors, school board trustees and all other elected officials in all of the province's municipalities.

== Electoral period ==
Submissions for candidate nominations were first accepted on 1 January 2014, at which time the campaign period began. The last day for acceptance of nominations or candidacy withdrawal was 12 September 2014.

From 1978 until 2006 the second Monday of November was the fixed date. Notwithstanding advance polling arrangements, municipal elections will be held on the fourth Monday of October, that is 27 October 2014.

The elected representatives will begin their council terms on 1 December 2014. Officials will serve a four-year term excepting death or resignation. All candidates must terminate their campaigning activity by 31 December 2014; this includes, for example, collecting electoral signs. They must file campaign financial details by 27 March 2015.

== Single tier municipalities ==
=== Brant County ===
Mayoral Candidate	Vote	%
Ron Eddy (X)	5,357	56.77
Roy Haggart	2,508	26.58
Shawn Pratt	1,571	16.65

=== Brantford ===
Mayoral Candidate	Vote	%
Chris Friel (X)	8,743	36.02
Jan Vanderstelt	4,519	18.62
Dave Wrobel	4,042	16.65
Michael St. Amant	3,703	15.26
Mark H. Littell	2,018	8.31
Mary Ellen Kaye	1,113	4.59
John Turmel	133	0.55

=== Chatham-Kent ===
Mayoral Candidate	Vote	%
Randy Hope (X)	9,242	28.55
Marjorie Crew	7,884	24.35
Steve Brent	5,603	17.31
Ian McLarty	4,451	13.75
Jeff Bultje	4,298	13.28
Reno Lachapelle	558	1.72
John Willatt	339	1.05

=== Haldimand County ===
Mayoral Candidate	Vote	%
Ken Hewitt (X)	6,804	52.19
Kevin Smith	3,308	25.37
John Trainer	1,541	11.82
Marnie Knight	1,385	10.62

=== Kawartha Lakes ===
Mayoral Candidate	Vote	%
Andy Letham	16,055	58.01
Donna Villemare	4,742	17.13
Brenda Lee Karagiannis	3,888	14.05
John Macklem	2,338	8.45
Bill Denby	654	2.36

=== Norfolk County ===
Mayoral Candidate	Vote	%
Charlie Luke	10,644	54.15
Dennis Travale (X)	8,166	41.54
Jim Miller	848	4.31

=== Prince Edward County ===
Mayoral Candidate	Vote	%
Robert Leighton Quaff	4,837	51.10
Jeff Goddard	2,817	29.76
Paul Boyd	1,811	19.13

== Separated municipalities ==
=== Belleville ===
Mayoral Candidate	Vote	%
Taso Christopher	3,914	25.98
Pat Culhane	3,753	24.91
Richard David Courneyea	2,520	16.73
Bill Glisky	2,284	15.16
Jill Raycroft	1,874	12.44
Lonnie Herrington	379	2.52
Kenzo Dozono	343	2.28

=== Brockville ===
Mayoral Candidate	Vote	%
David Henderson (X)	2,628	36.76
Louise Severson	2,394	33.49
Cec Drake	2,127	29.75

=== Cornwall ===
Mayoral Candidate	Vote	%
Leslie O'Shaughnessy	6,277	50.78
Bob Kilger (X)	5,396	43.66
Jamie Gilcig	687	5.56

=== Gananoque ===
Mayoral Candidate	Vote	%
Erika Demchuk (X)	838	40.94
James E. Garrah	553	27.02
Joe Truesdell	487	23.79
Don Mills	169	8.26

=== London ===
In June 2014, mayor Joe Fontana resigned after being convicted for misusing government funds. On June 24, Council appointed Joni Baechler as mayor for the remainder of the current term.

=== Kingston ===
Mayoral Candidate	Vote	%
Bryan Paterson	13,577	38.15
Dorothy Hector	8,663	24.34
Rick Downes	8,388	23.57
Brenda Slomka	4,108	11.54
Scott Foster	492	1.38
Michael J. M. Owen	362	1.02

=== Orillia ===
Mayoral Candidate	Vote	%
Steve Clarke	8,090	89.99
John Maxwell	900	10.01

=== Pembroke ===
Mayoral Candidate	Vote	%
Mike LeMay	2,144	47.80
Ed Jacyno (X)	1,380	30.77
Dan Callaghan	961	21.43

=== Peterborough ===
Mayoral Candidate	Vote	%
Daryl Bennett (X)	11,210	41.38
Maryam Monsef	9,879	36.47
Alan Wilson	4,052	14.96
Patti S. Peeters	1,564	5.77
Terry LeBlanc	202	0.75
Tom Young	183	0.68

=== Prescott ===
Mayoral Candidate	Vote	%
Brett Todd (X)	1,105	64.36
Sandra Lawn	482	28.07
Kelly Cole	130	7.57

=== Quinte West ===
Mayoral Candidate	Vote	%
Jim Harrison	6,131	61.02
Terry Cassidy	2,255	22.44
Sandra Carter	1,470	14.63
Monte Hennessy	149	1.48
Claud'R du-Lude	42	0.42

=== Smiths Falls ===
Mayoral Candidate	Vote	%
Shawn James Pankow	1,619	47.17
Ken Graham	1,078	31.41
Rob Peters	680	19.81
Benjamin DuHamel	55	1.60

=== Stratford ===
Mayoral Candidate	Vote	%
Dan Mathieson (X)	8,638	81.54
Don Robinson	1,166	11.01
Martin Weatherall	523	4.94
Matthew Murphy	266	2.51

=== St. Marys ===
Mayoral Candidate	Vote	%
Al Strathdee	2,031	72.85
Steve Grose (X)	757	27.15

=== St. Thomas ===
Mayoral Candidate	Vote	%
Heather Jackson (X)	4,475	45.15
Mark E. Cosens	3,633	36.66
Cliff Barwick	1,803	18.19

=== Windsor ===
Mayoral Candidate	Vote	%
Drew Dilkens	32,271	55.36
John Millson	15,848	27.19
Larry Horwitz	7,293	12.51
Ernie The Bacon Man	640	1.10
Robin Easterbrook	611	1.05
Bruce Martin	365	0.63
Steve Gavrildis	330	0.57
Timothy Dugdale	295	0.51
Mike Tessier	244	0.42
Raymond Poisson	143	0.25
Ronald Van Dyk	132	0.23
Jaysen R. Sylvestre	123	0.21

== Term lengths ==
The Legislative Assembly of Ontario legislation (Bill 81, Schedule H), passed in 2006, sets the length of terms in office for all municipal elected officials at four years.
