= CKIN =

CKIN may refer to:

- CKIN-FM 106.3, a radio station in Montreal, Quebec, Canada
- Chesapeake and Indiana Railroad reporting mark

== See also ==
- Protein kinase C, commonly abbreviated to PKC, also C-kinase, a family of protein kinase enzymes that are involved in controlling the function of other proteins
