= M105 =

M105 or M-105 may refer to:

- Messier 105, an elliptical galaxy in the constellation Leo
- M105, a 1½ ton US Army trailer
- M-105 (Michigan highway), a former state highway in Michigan
- Klimov M-105 aircraft engine
- CFXM-FM, a radio station in Granby, Quebec, branded M105
- WWWM, a radio station in Cleveland, Ohio now known as WMJI

In athletics:

- Masters athletics, an age group for athletes aged 35+
