= Richard Burnett (disambiguation) =

Richard Burnett is a columnist and editor of Montreal's alternative newsweekly Hour.

Richard Burnett may also refer to:

- Dick Burnett (musician) (1883–1977), fiddler and composer
- Dick Burnett (baseball), former owner of the Dallas Rangers baseball team
- Richie Burnett (born 1967), Welsh darts player
- Rick Burnett (musician), in Grinderswitch
- Rick Burnett, presenter on Australian TV series Extra
- Richard Compton-Burnett (born 1961), English cricketer
