= Leslie O'Shaughnessy =

Canadian politician and mayor of Cornwall, Ontario

Mayor of Cornwall, Ontario
- In office December 1, 2014 – December 1, 2018
- Preceded by: Bob Kilger
- Succeeded by: Bernadette Clement

Personal details
- Born: Cornwall, Ontario, Canada

Leslie O'Shaughnessy (April 13, 1954 – August 14, 2023) was a Canadian politician, who was elected mayor of Cornwall, Ontario in the 2014 municipal election.

Born in Cornwall, O'Shaughnessy previously served as reeve of the nearby township of Charlottenburg in the 1990s, and ran as a Progressive Conservative Party of Canada candidate for Stormont—Dundas in the 1997 federal election. He later moved back to Cornwall, and was elected to Cornwall City Council as a city councillor in 2003. He ran for mayor in the 2006 municipal election, but was not elected.

He ran again in the 2010 municipal election and was re-elected as a city councillor, but resigned his seat in 2012 citing concerns about the council's commitment to accountability and transparency. In the 2014 election, he defeated incumbent mayor Bob Kilger. O'Shaughnessy ran for election again in 2018, but finished third behind the winner Bernadette Clement.

He died on August 14, 2023 of cancer.
