= Richard Burnett =

Canadian artist

- Born: Richard Burnett; Montreal, Quebec, Canada
- Other name: Bugs Burnett
- Education: Concordia University
- Occupations: Writer, editor, journalist, and columnist

Richard Burnett, also known as Bugs Burnett, is a Canadian writer, editor, journalist, and columnist. He is known as an often controversial fixture of the Montreal media, with his writing sometimes attracting attention internationally. His column and blog, "Three Dollar Bill", dealt with pop culture, art, and gay life and culture across Canada and around the world. "Three Dollar Bill" was the first—and remains the only—syndicated LGBTQ+ column in Canadian publishing history, and it ran for 15 years.

In 2017, CBC Arts wrote that "If you live in Montreal and you go out at night, you know Richard "Bugs" Burnett. Perhaps that's an understatement. If you live in Montreal and go outside, you know Burnett. Existentially speaking, if Richard Burnett does not attend your event, it might be said that your event never happened."

== Career ==
Burnett began working as a writer in the 1990s for several magazines and newspapers.

=== "Three Dollar Bill" ===
His column and blog, "Three Dollar Bill", dealt with pop culture, art, and gay life and culture across Canada and around the world. He often spoke frankly about topics that were considered taboo. "Three Dollar Bill" was the first—and remains the only—syndicated LGBTQ+ column in Canadian publishing history, and it ran for 15 years. In an interview with CBC, Brunett said the column was averaging more than 1 million readers at its peak.

"Three Dollar Bill" debuted in July 1996 and ran in several alternative newsweeklies. The column first made national news in September 1998 when Winnipeg’s Uptown magazine dropped the column after one installment ignited a citywide furor over gay sex. Montreal Gazette columnist Bill Brownstein reported about this incident in his July 26, 2006 column on the 10th anniversary of "Three Dollar Bill".

Over the last decade, his column has been dropped by a Winnipeg weekly after complaints about its graphic content, and underwent an investigation by the Royal Newfoundland Constabulary for being 'pornographic'. Current Parti Québécois leader André Boisclair is no fan of the man, after Burnett outed him [in 1997] - not out of malice but because Burnett felt that Boisclair, a PQ cabinet minister at the time, was being hypocritical and hurtful.

Brownstein also wrote that "Burnett has interviewed celebs from diva Cher to author Anne Rice. He has crossed swords with B.B. King and Mordecai Richler. He has outed Ricky Martin—again for hypocrisy—and outraged Cyndi Lauper. And he's had death threats."

=== Other work ===
Burnett was one of the original organizers of Montreal’s internationally renowned Divers/Cité festival, was the founding president of the Montreal chapter of the National Lesbian and Gay Journalists Association, is a regular lecturer and panelist at universities and conferences, and co-starred in the first season of the Life Network’s reality TV series Out in the City.

Burnett was also editor-at-large of Montreal's alternative newsweekly Hour for 15 years until the newspaper published its last issue on April 7, 2011. Burnett wrote his POP TART blog for the Montreal Gazette from 2011 to 2016, as well as his weekly Seven Days, Seven Nights arts column from 2014 to 2016.

Burnett also got the last-ever sit-down interview with James Brown before Brown died on December 25, 2006.

Burnett has been writing for the Montreal-based LGBT magazine Fugues (magazine), since 1995.

As his career has progressed, he has devoted a significant amount of his writing into covering opera.

== Controversies ==
He is known as an often controversial fixture of the Montreal media, with his writing sometimes attracting attention internationally.

Burnett's 2004 Hour cover story interview with Jamaican dancehall performer Sizzla was reported on national newscasts in Canada, and made international headlines—including in Jamaica's national newspaper The Jamaica Gleaner—after Sizzla told Burnett, "[Homosexuality] is wrong! Once we stoop to sodomites and homosexuals, it is wrong! ... Burn all things that are wrong. Burn it... We must get rid of Sodom and Gomorrah right now." In response to Burnett and British gay activist Peter Tatchell's criticisms, Sizzla wrote the 2005 song "Nah Apologize" in which he repeats in the chorus "Rastaman nah apologize to no batty boy!"

In 2005, Burnett was quoted about rising new HIV infections in a POZ cover story called "Bite the Bullet" as saying that "If you want to play God, [deliberately] spread HIV and ruin other lives in the process—then do us all a g------ favor and put a f------ bullet through your head instead."

Burnett made more headlines when he criticized the Federation of Gay Games decision to revoke Montreal's 2006 Gay Games after the FGG's acrimonious split with Montreal organizers. "If the Gay Games are the Uganda of the sports world, then the FGG is Idi Amin," Burnett wrote.

Burnett also riled many Canadians when he critiqued the medals of Vancouver's 2010 Winter Olympics. "The gold and bronze medals look like melted chocolate someone pulled out of their back pocket," Burnett told the Associated Press. "The silver medal looks like it still has foil wrap on it."

== Cultural impact ==
Burnett was named one of Alberta-based Outlooks magazine's Canadian Heroes of the Year in their June 2009 issue, and was listed by Quebec's French-language gay publication Fugues as one of that province's 100 most influential gay Quebecers. "As Michael Musto is to New York City, Richard Burnett is to Montreal," The Montreal Buzz stated in April 2010.

Throughout his career, Burnett has been known as a prominent figure in Montreal's nightlife scene. In 2017, CBC Arts wrote that "If you live in Montreal and you go out at night, you know Richard "Bugs" Burnett. Perhaps that's an understatement. If you live in Montreal and go outside, you know Burnett. Existentially speaking, if Richard Burnett does not attend your event, it might be said that your event never happened."

== Influences ==
Burnett cites the late Montreal newspaperman Nick Auf der Maur and The New York Times bestselling author Felice Picano as his two mentors.
