= Sarah Good (politician) =

Her Worship Sarah Good

Mayor of Cornwall
- Incumbent
- Assumed office November 15, 2026
- Preceded by: Justin Towndale

Cornwall City Councillor
- In office November 15, 2022 – November 14, 2026

Personal details
- Born: August 25, 1988 (age 38)

Sarah Good (born August 25, 1988) is a Canadian politician who has served as mayor of Cornwall, Ontario since November 2026. She had previously served as a councillor on Cornwall City Council from 2022 to 2026.

== Early Life and Education ==
Good was born in Lancaster, Ontario, where she lived until the age of 10. She received an Honours bachelor's degree in geography at Carleton University in Ottawa. Sometime after university, she settled down in Cornwall, where she started a family.

== Political career ==
=== Cornwall City Councillor ===
Good was nominated for Cornwall City Council ahead of the 2022 Ontario municipal elections on May 2, 2022. She was the only applicant to file for candidacy on opening day. Good would ultimately finish first with 5,478 votes in the council race, more than any candidate in Cornwall's municipal elections, including the mayor and trustee races.

During her time on Council, Good was heavily involved in talks regarding the city's proposed implementation of a water meter system. In November 2023, she proposed a motion to implement a vacant unit tax in Cornwall. In November 2024, Good voted on a pay raise for Council. This pay raise was sourced from a proposed $47,000 figure for health benefits for Council. Good was ultimately the Councillor to suggest that this money go to a pay increase instead.

In the last year of her term, Good ran for the position of mayor of Cornwall.

=== 2025 Federal Election ===
On March 13, 2025, it was reported that Good was acclaimed as the Liberal candidate for Stormont—Dundas—Glengarry in the 2025 federal election. Her campaign launch event was held in March 2023, 2025. In her campaign, Good emphasized her views as a self-described progressive Liberal.

Good finished in 2nd place behind incumbent MP Eric Duncan. She received 39.8% of the vote and a total of 26,407 votes, the most in the riding for any Federal Liberal candidate since Bob Kilger in 1997.

=== Mayor of Cornwall ===
==== Campaign ====
On March 24, 2026, prior to the 2026 municipal elections, Good announced her intention to run for mayor of Cornwall. In May 2026, Good took to social media to announce that she would step away from municipal politics, citing online harassment and toxicity. On August 20, the day before the deadline to file campaign nomination, Good ultimately re-entered the mayoral race.

Good's campaign emphasized experience, strong leadership, and a desire to increase accountability in municipal affairs. On August 21, 2026, the City of Cornwall disclosed that somebody had complained that Good failed to file an auditor's report for her 2022 bid for Cornwall City Council. On October 2, an affidavit revealed that it was incumbent mayor Justin Towndale who raised these concerns with the city. On the same day, an Ontario Superior Court justice dismissed the referral, citing concerns that the situation may have been outside of the Court's jurisdiction.

On October 27, 2026, the City of Cornwall certified that Good won the 2026 Mayoral Election. She received 7,545 votes. Second place was incumbent mayor Justin Towndale, who received 4,559 votes.

== Electoral Record ==
=== 2026 Cornwall Municipal Election ===
Mayoral Candidate	Vote	%
Sarah Good	7,545	53.9
Justin Towndale (X)	4,559	32.6
Art Levert	1,588	11.3
Nicole Spahich	301	2.2

=== 2025 Canadian Federal Election: Stormont—Dundas—Glengarry ===
2025 Canadian federal election: Stormont—Dundas—Glengarry
Party	Candidate	Votes	%	±%
Conservative	Eric Duncan	37,399	56.32	+1.99
Liberal	Sarah Good	26,407	39.77	+15.06
New Democratic	Mario Leclerc	1,653	2.49	–8.41
Green	Gordon Kubanek	674	1.01	–1.30
Libertarian	Karl Ivan MacKinnon	270	0.41	N/A
Total valid votes		66,407	99.38	
Total rejected ballots		417	0.62	-0.43
Turnout		66,824	68.59	+6.13
Eligible voters		97,432		
Conservative notional hold		Swing		–6.53
Source: Elections Canada
