= CHEF =

Former radio station in Granby, Quebec

Granby, Quebec; Canada
- Frequency: 1450 kHz

Ownership
- Owner: Les Journaux Trans-Canada

History
- First air date: March 14, 1946
- Last air date: January 19, 1996

Technical information
- Power: 10,000 watts

CHEF was a radio station that operated at 1450 kHz on the AM band in Granby, Quebec, Canada.

== History ==
The station was founded in 1945 by the publishers of La Voix de l'Est, Granby's local newspaper. The radio station would have the call sign CHEF, and was expected to commence operations with 250 watts of power in December.

CHEF signed on the air March 14, 1946. It broadcast on a frequency of 1450 kHz with a power of 250 watts.

Over the years since CHEF's sign on in 1946, the station went through a number of different ownerships, formats and technical upgrades. By 1996, the station was owned by La Voix de l'Est's owners, Les Journaux Trans-Canada (since renamed Gesca Limitée), and broadcasting at 10,000 watts.

On January 19, 1996, CHEF left the air due to financial problems. The CRTC revoked the licence on February 28 at the licensee's request.

== Aftermath ==
In 1997, a cooperative formed by former CHEF staff members received a licence for a new FM station at Granby, CFXM-FM, a community radio station broadcasting on 104.9 MHz with an effective radiated power of 200 watts.

The 1450 frequency would be reassigned to Montreal, where CHOU signed on in 2007.
