= Justin Towndale =

Canadian politician

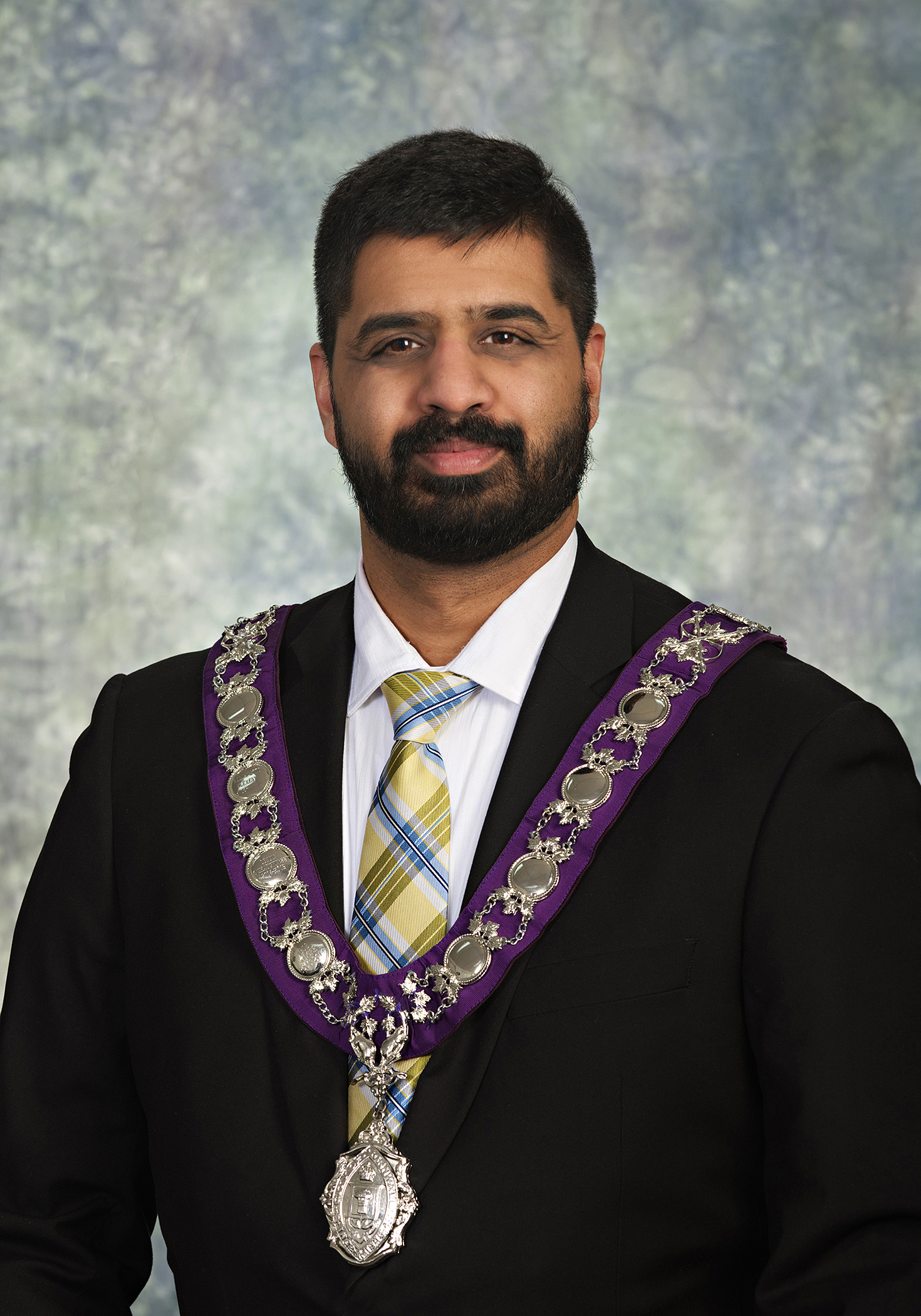
- Mayor Justin Towndale

Mayor of Cornwall
- In office November 15, 2022 – November 14, 2026
- Preceded by: Glen Grant
- Succeeded by: Sarah Good

Cornwall City Councillor
- In office December 1, 2014 – November 14, 2022

Personal details
- Born: February 13, 1983 (age 43) Toronto, Ontario, Canada
- Party: Independent
- Spouse: Sarah Beach
- Education: University of Toronto

Military service
- Allegiance: Canada
- Branch/service: Canadian Army
- Years of service: 2016-Present
- Rank: Captain

Justin Towndale is a Canadian politician who served as the mayor of Cornwall from November 2022 to October 2026. He had previously served as a councillor on the city council.

== Early life ==
Towndale was born in Toronto and moved to Cornwall as an infant after being adopted by his parents, Angelo and Margaret. While Towndale's adoptive parents are Indian, his biological mother was Trinidadian.

His adoptive parents migrated from India to Canada from Kochi, with Angelo arriving in Canada in 1969 and Margaret arriving later, in 1971. Towndale attended The University of St. Michael's College at the University of Toronto. He graduated with an Honours Bachelors of Arts, with a double major in political science and Canadian studies, and a minor in history. Following graduation, Towndale worked at Queen's Park for John Milloy for four years.

Towndale is a captain in the Primary Reserve of the Canadian Armed Forces. He is a member of the Stormont, Dundas and Glengarry Highlanders, and represented the regiment in the commemorative parade in Ottawa to honour the late Queen Elizabeth II.

== Political career ==
=== Cornwall City Councillor ===
As councillor Towndale proposed reducing the size of the Cornwall City Council and to replace the blanket election for councillors with a ward system. Additionally he worked to lift the citywide ban on arcades and worked on the city's COVID-19 response. Additionally as councillor Towndale championed the Nav Centre as an evacuee holding center during the early stages of the pandemic. While on the council in May 2020 Fire Chief Pierre Voisine resigned and took the same job at Clarence-Rockland. In response Towndale tweeted "Just found out our Fire Chief is leaving for the same job in Clarence-Rockland. Know how I found out? Someone sent me a screenshot of the press release from Clarence-Rockland. I would have expected this sort of news from our administration, or Chief himself, first." The city council determined on March 22, 2021, that by tweeting this Towndale had violated the city's code of conduct by issuing "unwelcome" public criticisms of the city government and for "bullying" Mr. Voisine, a city employee. During the end of his time as Councillor and due to his status as a Lieutenant in the SD&G Highlanders, Towndale was selected as an honorary Pallbearer at the Queen Elizabeth Memorial Parade in Ottawa coinciding with the Funeral of Queen Elizabeth II.

=== Mayor of Cornwall ===
==== Campaign ====
The key points that Towndale ran on during his mayoral election included increasing affordable housing, attracting medical professionals to the city, accessibility for the handicapped, police reforms, green initiatives and further cooperation with the Ontario provincial and Canadian federal governments. Additionally, he supported balancing the city's budget, running the city's public transit on Sundays, and supporting the creation of an arts centre despite its $4,500,000–6,500,000 price tag. On election night of October 24 he defeated incumbent interim mayor Glen Grant in the election with 5,169 votes to Grant's 4,088 with a 28.6% turnout and was sworn in as mayor on November 15. Towndale's financial statements reported spending $11,559.27 and declaring a deficit of $1,158.04 on the campaign, making his run for mayor the third largest spend in the municipal election campaign.

==== Mayor ====
During his swearing in ceremony Towndale reaffirmed his campaign promises and that he is "eager to begin work on addressing housing issues including homelessness, to begin work on attracting more doctors and to improve internal processes like permitting." In early June 2023, Towndale's government faced a serious challenge as 40% of the Cornwall Police Service went on leave, including its police chief Shawna Spowart, over concerns that the police service board wasn't addressing issues of leadership problems in the service. Just a week before Spowart went on leave, the chairman of the Cornwall police service board, Michel Payette, resigned. The sudden unavailability of a large portion of the force has left them "ham-strung" and struggling to perform effective enforcement. Towndale has also been a leading voice in town hall meetings. Towndale has also been supportive of a Great Wolf Resorts being built in Cornwall, that he argues will "change the face of Eastern Ontario" and will be "the premier tourist attractions not only in this area, but in the entire province." the 40 acre property is expected to cost 430 million USD to complete and will have an estimated 670,000 guests annually.

Mayor Towndale's greatest challenge during his tenure would be his public dispute with Immigration, Refugees and Citizenship Canada (IRCC). As the Canadian government was in the process of renegotiating the Canada–United States Safe Third Country Agreement to close the Roxham Road loophole, Towndale stated that Cornwall "needs more help from Ottawa to deal with the influx of asylum seekers." The IRCC has sent some 900 asylum seekers to the city of 90,000 and Towndale and the city council argues that due to the lack of proper facilities, and the lack of warning from the IRCC has meant most of the seekers are living in hotel rooms for free, which further strains the city's economy. Towndale stated that the cost of housing the migrants was 50% of total city spending, and called on the IRCC to improve communication with local officials. Towndale stated that he only learned about the agreement to house the asylum seekers in hotels through "unofficial channels" and that he and the city was given "Zero notice, consultation or resources" from the IRCC. Mayor Towndale has worked with Bernadette Clement, former mayor of Cornwall and current Canadian Senator to broach the problem to the federal government. Towndale concluded that "At the end, it's the asylum claimants that will suffer," and that "They'll be left in limbo. They won't have any support, at all." Cornwall is not alone on the issue; some 39,000 asylum seekers have crossed the border at Roxham Road, with the IRCC simply busing them to cities in the region, and leaving local officials to not only find a solution for housing, but also footing the bill.

==== Re-election campaign ====
Mayor Towndale was nominated for re-election on May 4, 2026. During his campaign, Towndale focused on housing, homelessness, access to primary care physicians, and the cost of living. He also campaigned on the successes of his first term. On August 21, 2026, an unknown party alerted the city that Sarah Good, Towndale's primary challenger, had not included an auditor's report for her 2022 City Council bid. In October 2026, it was revealed via an affidavit that Towndale was the party responsible for this concern. On October 2nd, an Ontario Superior Court Justice ruled that Good would be allowed to stay in the race.

On election night, final unofficial results showed that challenger Sarah Good, with 65.2% of the vote, had defeated Mayor Towndale, who had received only 18.5% of the vote. Towndale conceded on the night of the election. The next day, however, The City of Cornwall released a statement revealing that they had failed to count over 2,000 ballots for Towndale. Though this did not change the winner of the election, it revealed Towndale's real vote share to be 32.6%.
