= CHHU-FM =

Multicultural radio station in Halifax, Nova Scotia

- Halifax, Nova Scotia; Canada
- Frequency: 99.1 MHz
- Branding: Radio Middle East

Programming
- Format: Arabic

Ownership
- Owner: Radio Middle East

History
- First air date: April 2016

Technical information
- Class: A (FM)
- Power: 355 watts
- ERP: 49 watts

Links
- Website: CHHU-FM

CHHU-FM is a multicultural and multilingual radio station broadcasting at 99.1 MHz in Halifax, Nova Scotia, Canada, operating under the branding Radio Middle East. The station is owned by Radio Moyen-Orient (Middle East Radio) and licensed to Antoine "Tony" Karam (on behalf of a corporation to be incorporated), who received CRTC approval on September 15, 2015.

CHHU plans on broadcasting programming in ten languages, though its main target audience will be Halifax's Arabic-speaking community, as the station broadcasts only in Arabic during the day and in other languages at night. CHHU currently has no studio in the Halifax area, though they intend on building one in the future; in the interim, programming will originate from a dedicated studio at its Montreal sister station, CHOU.

CHHU began testing on 99.1 MHz on Friday, February 26, 2016; and regular broadcasting started in April 2016.

== See also ==
- CHOU (AM)
