= Glengarry and Stormont Railway =

Defunct Canadian railway

Overview
- Locale: Ontario, Canada
- Dates of operation: 1915–1995

Technical
- Track gauge: 4 ft 8 1/2 in (1,435 mm) standard gauge
- Length: 45 km

The Glengarry and Stormont Railway (G&SR) was a short line railway running from the town of Cornwall in eastern Ontario to connect to the Canadian Pacific Railway's (CP) Ontario and Quebec Railway (O&Q) mainline just inside the Quebec border, a total distance of about 45 kilometres (28 mi). The name refers to the counties it passed through, today amalgamated as Stormont, Dundas and Glengarry.

The line was chartered in 1912 to provide CP service to Cornwall, which was previously served by the Grand Trunk Railway and New York and Ottawa Railway. The line opened in May 1915, and only days later was leased to CP for 99 years. It operated as their Cornwall Subdivision until being abandoned in 1995. As of 2015, the right of way remains in good condition, with small portions being used for a variety of recreational uses.

== History ==
=== Previous attempts ===
Cornwall had long been connected to the Grand Trunk Railway's (GTR) Toronto-Montreal mainline, which ran along the northern section of the downtown area. However, a connection to other lines was desired, both to access additional routes, especially westward, as well as to provide competition for the GTR.

In 1881, Canadian Pacific Railway (CP) interests chartered the Ontario and Quebec Railway to build a line from Toronto to Smiths Falls in eastern Ontario, some distance southwest of Ottawa. Smiths Falls would offer a connection with the Brockville and Ottawa Railway (B&O), which rechartered as the Canada Central Railway (CCR) in 1881 to build an extension to Ottawa. In 1882, the Cornwall Junction Railway was chartered to build a line from Cornwall to meet the CCR at Smiths Falls, and then press on to Perth or Carleton Place.

CP's plans expanded, and additional routes were added to the growing Q&O network. This included purchasing the Atlantic and North-West Railway (A&N) in Quebec from its US owners, and planning for a connecting line between Smiths Falls and the A&N at Montreal. (Note: This part of CP's network is now known as the Winchester Subdivision.) These links made the original Cornwall Junction plans superfluous. The Cornwall Junction Railway rechartered on 2 September 1886 with plans to run northeast out of Cornwall to meet the O&Q at its closest point, about 20 kilometres (12 mi) north of the city. The O&Q extension to Montreal was completed in 1888, but the Cornwall line was never built.

Competition arrived on 23 June 1887, when the Prescott County Railway was chartered to build three lines in the eastern Ontario area based on the Canadian Atlantic Railway's (CAR) mainline running from Ottawa to Montreal, only a short distance north of the O&Q. The first would connect to the CAR at Glen Robertson and run north to Hawkesbury on the Ottawa River, a second would run southwest from Glen Robertson to Cornwall, and the third was a completely separate line just east of Ottawa running from Limoges to Rockland. The company was renamed the Central Counties Railway in April 1880, and leased to the CAR on 17 April 1891. For reasons that are not well recorded, the CCR abandoned plans for their Cornwall connection in 1898.

Next up was the Cornwall and Hawkesbury Railway chartered in 1910 to build almost due north from Cornwall through Martintown and Alexandria to Hawkesbury, and then crossing the Ottawa River to connect to Canadian Pacific's line running along the north shore, meeting it somewhere between Calumet and Grenville in Quebec. This would run parallel to the CCR's Hawkesbury line, a short distance to the west. Nothing came of this initial proposal, and a second attempt to recharter the company in 1914 also led nowhere.

=== Construction ===
The Glengarry and Stormont Railway chartered in May 1912, with their own plans to connect to the O&Q. The original plan was to run almost due north out of Cornwall to the O&Q somewhere near Apple Hill, while a branch line would wye off at Martintown and run eastward for Williamstown and Lancaster. The original alignment was short lived.

On 8 May 1913 the company rechartered with a new alignment running eastward through Williamstown to meet the O&Q further east at a point that became known as Saint-Polycarpe Junction, just west of the small (ghost) town of De Beaujeu. (Note: In many references this point is referred to as Soulanges, although neither Soulanges or Saint-Thomas-de-Soulanages are particularly close.) Minor re-alignments followed over the next year before the settling on the final route.

This last incarnation of the Glengarry and Stormont was finally successful in attracting investment. Track laying was completed on 30 November 1914, leaving only the stations and grading to be completed. The line's completion ceremony was marked by a dinner in Williamstown on 2 December. The first inspection train ran the line into Cornwall on 30 March. The first through train ran from Montreal on 2 April, and the line officially opened on 24 May 1915. On 1 June it was leased to the CPR for 99 years. As part of widespread changes to the railway operating rules, the G&SR officially became part of the CPR and operated as their Cornwall Subdivision.

The Cornwall Street Railway built interchanges at their yards in Cornwall, offering businesses the ability to use the tram network to ship goods to the G&SR. In order to reduce the amount of traffic being carried on the lines on city streets, a new interchange line was built in 1949, which was itself replaced in 1953 by a new switching yard on the north edge of town, just south of the GTR (by this time Canadian National Railway) lines.

=== Abandonment ===
On 27 April 1952 CP received permission to abandon passenger service on the Cornwall Sub. The last passenger train left town on 20 September. This made the passenger station redundant and the short bit of line between Pitt and Sydney streets was abandoned on 31 January 1969.

CP purchased the Cornwall Street Railway on 24 October 1969 in order to use their lines as spurs, but abandoned these plans and sold the lines to CN on 14 October 1970. CP abandoned the entire Cornwall Sub on 25 December 1995. Their short-lived subsidiary, the St. Lawrence and Hudson Railway, lifted the rails in 1998. The company was formally dissolved on 30 September 2004.

== Route ==
From the Ontario Railway Map Collection unless otherwise noted.

The line's main station in Cornwall was located on the corner of Pitt Street and Sixth Street West, running east between Pitt and Sydney. A freight shed was located a block east at Amelia, within a larger L-shaped block of land forming the main railway operating area. Within the roughly rectangular area between Amelia and Adolphus, Sixth and Eight, were the turntable, engine house, water tower and ash pit.

The line exited the rail yard heading northeast for a distance before it curved to the east-northeast at a point just outside town, just south of today's Ontario Highway 401. From there the line runs very straight, passing just north of Williamstown, bending slightly eastward to pass through Glen Gordon, and then east-northeast again for the remainder of the run to Saint-Polycarpe Junction, passing just outside Saint-Télesphore along the way.

As of 2015, the original station grounds between Pitt and Sydney is the parking lot for a Giant Tiger dollar store. The original switchyards are now mostly vacant, except for a Cornwall Electric (Note: Cornwall Electric is the remaining independent part of the Cornwall Street Railway tram service, having sold off their lines to CN and bus service to the city, leaving them as a local distribution company.) building at 7th and Adolphus. A short section between the north end of the yard at Eighth Street and Marlborough, about two blocks, has been developed as a bike path. Between Marlborough and McConnell Avenue the line forms the back of a parking lot for a plaza. The city owns the line as far east as Boundary Road, about 4 kilometres (2.5 mi) east, but it is currently undeveloped.

Between Boundary Road and Country Road 19, near Williamstown, the line is used for private snowmobile and ATV use. From Williamstown to Bridge End some portions have been destroyed by local farmers who took over the land. The remaining 9 kilometres (5.6 mi) from Bridge End to the O&Q at St. Polycarpe Junction are currently unused but in good condition.
