= Cornwall City Council =

Governing body for Cornwall, Ontario, Canada

Cornwall City Council (French: Conseil municipal de Cornwall) is the governing body for the city of Cornwall, Ontario, Canada. The council consists of the mayor and ten councillors. The mayor is elected via a first-past-the-post system while the councillors are elected via a blanket election where each voter can vote for 10 councillors, and the 10 councillors with the most votes are elected to the council.

== 2010–2014 ==
- Bob Kilger, mayor
- Denis Carr, councillor
- Bernadette Clément, councillor
- Maurice Dupelle, councillor
- Syd Gardiner, councillor
- Glen Grant, councillor
- Elaine MacDonald, councillor
- David Murphy, councillor
- André Rivette, councillor
- Leslie O'Shaughnessy, councillor - resigned in 2012 and was succeeded by Gerald Samson in a by-election
- Gerald Samson, councillor
- Denis Thibault, councillor

== 2014–2018 ==
Elected on October 27, 2014, the 2014–2018 council entered office on November 30, 2014.

- Leslie O'Shaughnessy, mayor
- Bernadette Clement, councillor
- Claude E. Macintosh, councillor
- Elaine MacDonald, councillor
- Justin Towndale, councillor
- Maurice Dupelle, councillor
- David Murphy, councillor
- Carilyne Hebert, councillor
- Brock Frost, councillor
- Mark A. Macdonald, councillor
- André Rivette, councillor

== 2018–2022 ==
Elected October 22, 2018.

- Bernadette Clement, mayor - resigned on June 22, 2021 and was succeeded via council appointment by Glen Grant as interim mayor
- Justin Towndale, councillor
- Elaine MacDonald, councillor
- Carilyne Hébert, councillor
- Maurice Dupelle, councillor
- Claude McIntosh, councillor
- Eric Bergeron, councillor
- Glen Garry Grant, councillor
- Dean Hollingsworth, councillor
- Todd Bennett, councillor
- Denis Carr, councillor

== 2022–2026 ==
Elected Monday, October 24, 2022. Took office November 15.

- Justin Towndale, mayor
- Todd Bennett, councillor
- Maurice Dupelle, councillor
- Syd Gardiner, councillor
- Sarah Good, councillor
- Carilyne Hébert, councillor
- Dean Hollingsworth, councillor
- Elaine MacDonald, councillor
- Claude E. McIntosh, councillor
- Fred Ngoundjo, councillor
- Denis Sabourin, councillor
