= CHOU (AM) =

Multilingual radio station in Montreal

- Montreal, Quebec; Canada
- Frequency: 1450 kHz
- Branding: Radio Moyen-Orient

Programming
- Format: multilingual, predominantly Arabic

Ownership
- Owner: Radio Moyen-Orient

History
- Call sign meaning: Chou (شو) means "What?" in Arabic

Technical information
- Class: B (AM); LP (FM)
- Power: 2,000 watts (daytime); 1,000 watts (nighttime) (AM)
- ERP: CHOU-1-FM: 49 watts (FM)
- Repeaters: 104.5 CHOU-1-FM (Montreal); 106.3 CKIN-HD2 (Montreal)

Links
- Website: meradio.ca

CHOU (Arabic: إذاعة الشرق الأوسط Idhā'at ash-Sharq al-'Awsaṭ ; French: Radio Moyen-Orient ; English: Middle East Radio) is a multilingual Canadian radio station broadcasting in Montreal, Quebec at 1450 kHz and retransmitted at 104.5 MHz and 106.3-2 on HD Radio. The main programming is in Arabic language and caters for various Arab and Middle Eastern communities in Greater Montreal and vicinity in Arabic including Lebanese, Syrian, Egyptian and Maghrebi dialects. CHOU also runs a two-hour weekly show in Armenian. It is also offered online and on various applications.

In 2016, Middle East Radio also launched CHHU-FM (99.1 MHz) in Halifax, Nova Scotia, with a multicultural/multilingual programming licence, with most of its programming in the Arabic language in addition to various multilingual programming in 10 different languages.

== History ==
Former Radio Middle East logo.

The station started its Arabic programming in 1996. For almost 10 years, and until early 2007, the station used SCMO (Subsidiary Communications Multiplex Operations) service located under the main carrier of CISM-FM. Subscribing listeners would have to buy special receiving devices to be able to tune in to the broadcasts.

Radio Moyen-Orient/Middle East Radio received approval to broadcast on 1450 by the CRTC on March 15, 2006, enabling the station to broadcast starting January 18, 2007 on the newly assigned AM channel without any need for acquiring special devices by listeners. This resulted in a big increase in the listenership of the station. The 1450 kHz frequency had been previously used by CHEF, a station in Granby, approximately 60 km (37 mi) east of Montreal. That station had stopped operations in 1996 and the frequency was reallocated to CHOU.

Middle East Radio main studios are located on de Meulles Avenue in the Cartierville region of Montreal. CHOU broadcasts on 1450 kHz with a power of 2,000 watts as a class B station, using an omnidirectional antenna. It was originally authorized to use only 1,000 watts; the power increase was implemented after being authorized in 2008.

On October 1, 2013, CHOU submitted an application to the CRTC for a new FM transmitter in St-Léonard, on the east end of Montreal Island, which was to operate at 104.5 MHz with 50 watts. The application was denied by the CRTC on October 7, 2014, as they felt that there were no broadcasting deficiencies of the 1450 AM signal within its immediate broadcast area, in addition to interference concerns with CKDG-FM 105.1, and CBME-FM's 104.7 transmitter in Notre-Dame-de-Grâce, on the west side of Montreal. However, on February 26, 2016, the CRTC reversed course and approved the transmitter application. The FM retransmitter with a height of 60 meters (200 feet), is located near Pie-IX Blvd, and broadcasts mainly cover Eastern Montreal at a low power of 49 watts, but its FM signal reportedly reach parts of Western Montreal, Ahunstic, Ville Saint Laurent and Laval as well, which is a similar coverage as for the AM signal. Unlike other FM stations, the CHOU-1-FM 104.5 FM retransmitting signal is in mono.

=== Ownership ===
The station is owned and operated by 9015-2018 Québec inc., an independent company doing business under the name "Radio Moyen Orient du Canada". The broadcaster received approval to broadcast by the CRTC on March 15, 2006, and began broadcasting on January 18, 2007, with an AM signal on 1450 AM. The two founders/owners of the radio station are Antoine (Tony) Karam and Zeina El-Soueidi.

=== Expansion to Halifax, Nova Scotia ===
On September 15, 2015, Middle East Radio's application for its second radio station channel with a multicultural and multilingual programming licence in Halifax, Nova Scotia was approved by the CRTC. The new station was assigned the call sign CHHU-FM and started broadcasting on 99.1 MHz/FM with a power of 600 watts. The station is owned by Radio Moyen-Orient (in English Middle East Radio) and licensed to Antoine (Tony) Karam (on behalf of a corporation to be incorporated) receiving CRTC approval.

CHHU-FM will eventually broadcast programming in ten languages, though its main target audience will be Halifax's Arabic-speaking community, as the station will broadcast exclusively in Arabic during the day and in other languages during night hours. CHHU-FM currently has no studio in the Halifax area, though they intend on building one in the future; in the interim, programming originates from a dedicated studio at the Montreal sister station, CHOU. where there is a studio dedicated to Halifax programming. CHHU-FM began testing on 99.1 MHz on February 26, 2016, and began regular broadcasting in April 2016.

=== Further planned expansions ===
The Middle East Radio media group also announced that expansion to Halifax will be part of a larger network that will share on-air content. Antoine (Tony) Karam said that his company was building a bigger network that will expand further to Ottawa and Edmonton where there are sizable Arab Canadian communities.

== Format ==
CHOU has a variety format which mainly targets the local Arabic community; most of its programming is accordingly done using the various Arabic dialects including:

- Lebanese dialect
- Syrian dialect
- Egyptian dialect
- Iraqi dialect
- Maghrebi Arabic dialects from Algeria, Tunisia and Morocco.

The station covers local, artistic and religious events for many MENA (Middle East and North Africa) communities in Quebec and Canada.

CHOU also carries news and discussion programming from Voice of Lebanon and Monte Carlo Doualiya.

CHOU also runs a two-hour weekly show in Armenian.

== Rebroadcasters ==
Rebroadcasters of CHOU
City of licence	Identifier	Frequency	Power	Class	RECNet	CRTC Decision
Montreal, Quebec	CHOU-1-FM	104.5 FM	49 watts	LP	Query	2016-72

== See also ==
- CHHU-FM
