= WCHP =

Christian radio station in Champlain, New York, United States

- Champlain, New York; United States
- Broadcast area: Greater Montreal, Canada
- Frequency: 760 kHz
- Branding: WCHP 760 AM

Programming
- Format: Christian radio

Ownership
- Owner: Champlain Radio, Inc.

History
- First air date: August 20, 1985
- Former call signs: WGGD (1984)
- Call sign meaning: "Champlain"

Technical information
- Licensing authority: FCC
- Facility ID: 10130
- Class: D
- Power: 35,000 watts (day); 11 watts (night)
- Transmitter coordinates: 44°56′44.14″N 73°25′46.49″W

Links
- Public license information: Public file; LMS
- Webcast: Listen live
- Website: www.wchp.com

WCHP (760 AM) is a radio station broadcasting a Christian radio format branded as WCHP 760 AM. Licensed to Champlain, New York, the station directs its daytime signal into nearby Montreal, Quebec, Canada, effectively being a border blaster. At night, the station broadcasts at a considerably lower power (11 watts), to protect WJR in Detroit. The station is owned by Champlain Radio, Inc.

== History ==
The station was assigned the call letters WGGD on November 14, 1984. On December 19, 1984, the station changed its call sign to the current WCHP. The station signed on August 20, 1985.
