= Phoenicia (periodical) =

Phoenicia فينيسيا
- Type: Weekly tabloid (2003-2010); Biweekly / monthly tabloid (2011 – April 2014)
- Founded: December 2003; Ceased publication: April 2014
- Language: Arabic, French, English, Armenian
- Headquarters: 9520 l'Acadie Blvd, #216, Montreal, Quebec, Canada H4N 1L8

Phoenicia (Arabic: فينيسيا pronounced féniisya in Arabic) was a Montreal-based Canadian Lebanese / pan-Arab publication that started in December 2003 as a weekly newspaper. Beginning of 2011, and after 6 years as a weekly newspaper, it continued publishing once every two weeks (26 issues per year) and starting June 2013, became a monthly publication (12 issues per year). It stopped publication in April 2014.

Phoenicia was a multilingual newspaper that had published since its start in 2003 in three languages: Arabic, French and English. Beginning with its 16 September 2011, Phoenicia added a fourth language section in Armenian published once every two weeks. When Phoenicia turned into a monthly publication, the Armenian news page was discontinued with last Armenian page supplement published on 3 May 2013. 43 Armenian supplement pages were published in total.

Phoenicia was distributed as a free newspaper throughout Lebanese, Arab and Armenian communities in Montreal, Laval and South Shore (Quebec), in Ottawa (Ontario) and in Halifax (Nova Scotia).

== See also ==
- List of newspapers in Canada
