= CKZW =

- Montreal, Quebec; Canada
- Frequency: 1650 kHz (HD Radio)
- Branding: Radio Shalom; La Radio Gospel

Programming
- Format: News, talk, Jewish radio, French gospel

Ownership
- Owner: Communications Média Évangélique/Gospel Media Communications

History
- First air date: 2006
- Former call signs: CJRS (2007–2016)

Technical information
- Class: C
- Power: 1,000 watts
- Transmitter coordinates: 45°29′15.00″N 73°40′6.96″W
- Repeater: 106.3 CKIN-HD3 (Montreal)

Links
- Website: Jewish format: radio-shalom.ca Gospel format: laradiogospel.ca

CKZW (1650 AM) is a 24-hour non-profit radio station based in Montreal, Quebec, Canada. Broadcasting a French language (and at times English language) Jewish format known as “Radio Shalom”, the station broadcasts at 1650 AM. At certain times, the station also broadcasts a bilingual Christian format known as “La Radio Gospel”.

== History ==
CJRS was initially established in 2001 as a subcarrier FM radio service, “Radio Shalom Montreal”, before relocating to 1650 AM in May 2007. It was Canada's first and only trilingual Jewish radio station. Radio Shalom was also the only all Jewish radio station in North America, broadcasting in French, English and Hebrew. The station was run under president Robert Levy.

Radio Shalom was the only radio station in Canada that broadcasts mizrahi, Yiddish, ladino, klezmer, hassidic and Israeli music. It also had news and talk shows such as the weekly Sunday evening program, The Howie Silbiger Show, which included a live call-in segment. Other shows include those produced by Alexandre Fredeau, and the long-running Montreal Jewish Magazine, hosted by Stanley Asher.

From 2007-2016, the station used the callsign CJRS. The CJRS call sign was previously used by Radiomutuel's Sherbrooke outlet, at 1510 AM on the dial. This station went off the air along with a host of other AM stations in 1994.

=== Radio CMM / CKZW / Le son Gospel du Québec ===
In accordance with Halacha (Jewish law), Jewish programming on Radio Shalom was suspended on Shabbat and on Jewish holidays. During these periods, the station branded itself on-air simply as CJRS 1650 AM, and also as Radio CMM (Communications Michel Mathieu) and "CKZW 1650", Le son gospel du Québec. French language (and at times English language) gospel music and programming were featured during these times. As of 2015, the CKZW call letters had not been registered with the CRTC or with Industry Canada; this finally took place in 2016, according to the Canadian Communications Foundation. It also offers a separate English-language stream. CKZW is programmed by André Joly, the founder of CKZW.

On Friday, April 1, 2016, it was announced that Radio Shalom will be ceasing operations that night at 6 p.m., as the volunteer-run operation lost money needed to keep the station in operation, and efforts to raise additional money through donations were in vain. There was no mention of Radio Shalom's closure on the air: its final program before the switchover was a syndicated Judaica program from France, which was abruptly cut off when it switched to CKZW's feed.

From that point onward, CKZW's Christian format was broadcast at all hours, including at times when Radio Shalom would have been broadcasting. The station's license conditions do not require it to broadcast in French or carry a Jewish format, though it does require it to limit its popular music and be balanced in religious issues. Joly subsequently announced plans to acquire CKZW, then still operating under the CJRS call sign, from Levy, pending CRTC approval.

=== Return of Jewish programming ===
On May 24, 2016, Radio Shalom announced the partial return of Jewish programming to CKZW via their official Facebook page. The content consists of a daily Israeli news program from 8 to 8:30 a.m., and a four-hour program from 7 to 11 p.m.

In the years that followed, additional Jewish programming was gradually added to CKZW's schedule. As of February 2020, the station returned to its prior Jewish format. Just as was the case under the previous version of the format, all Jewish programming is suspended on Shabbat and holidays, with gospel programming airing during those times. The gospel format also airs intermittently during the week and online via a live stream on La Radio Gospel's website.
