= Cornwall, Ontario =

City in Ontario, Canada

Cornwall
- City (single-tier)
- City of Cornwall
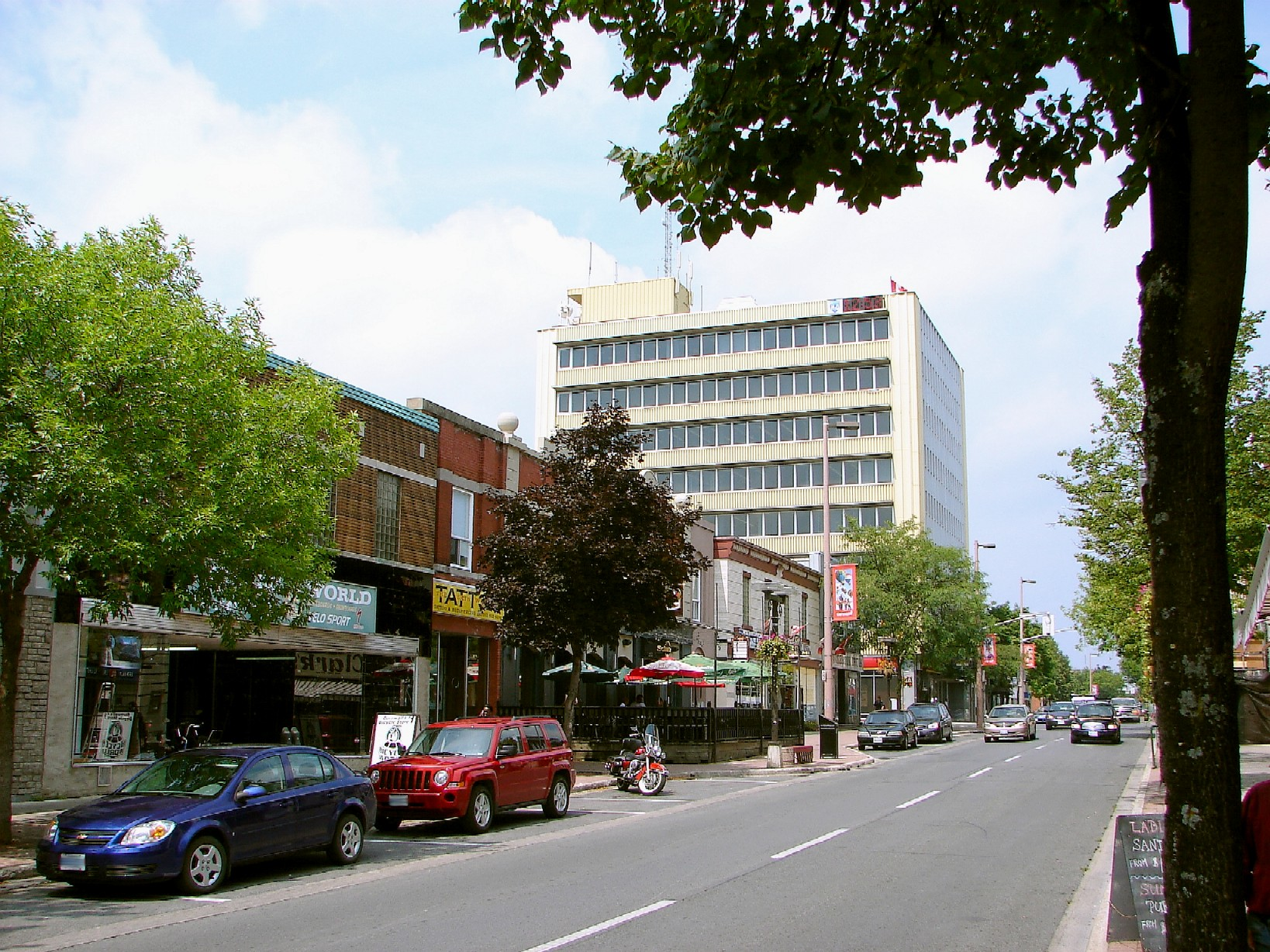

- Flag Coat of arms Logo
- Nicknames: The Friendly City, The Seaway City, The Friendly Seaway City
- Motto: Pro Patria
- Location within Southern Ontario Location within United Counties of Stormont, Dundas and Glengarry
- Coordinates: 45°01′39″N 74°44′24″W
- Country: Canada
- Province: Ontario
- County: Stormont, Dundas and Glengarry (geographically only)
- Founded: 1784
- Incorporated: 1834

Government
  - Mayor: Sarah Good
  - Governing Body: Cornwall City Council
  - MP: Eric Duncan (Conservative)
  - MPP: Nolan Quinn (PC)

Area
  - Land: 61.50 km^{2} (23.75 sq mi)
  - Urban: 32.40 km^{2} (12.51 sq mi)
  - Metro: 509.21 km^{2} (196.61 sq mi)
- Elevation: 64.00 m (209.97 ft)

Population (2021)
  - Total: 47,845
  - Density: 777.9/km^{2} (2,015/sq mi)
  - Urban: 47,286
  - Urban density: 1,459.6/km^{2} (3,780/sq mi)
  - Metro: 61,415
  - Metro density: 120.6/km^{2} (312/sq mi)
- Metropolitan area includes the City of Cornwall and South Stormont Twp.
- Time zone: UTC−5 (EST)
  - Summer (DST): UTC−4 (EDT)
- Postal Code FSA: K6H to K6J
- Area codes: 613, 343
- Website: cornwall.ca

Cornwall is a city in Eastern Ontario, Canada, situated where the provinces of Ontario and Quebec and the U.S. state of New York converge. It is Ontario's easternmost city. Although it is the seat of the United Counties of Stormont, Dundas and Glengarry, Cornwall is administered independently from the county.

Cornwall is named after the English Duchy of Cornwall; the city's coat of arms is based on that of the duchy with its colours reversed and the addition of a "royal tressure," a Scottish symbol of royalty.

It is the urban centre for the surrounding communities of Long Sault and Ingleside to the west; the Mohawk Territory of Akwesasne to the south; St. Andrews West and Avonmore to the north; and Glen Walter, Martintown, Apple Hill, Williamstown, and Lancaster to the east.

The city is located along the north shore of the St. Lawrence River and is home to the St. Lawrence Seaway Management Corporation, which oversees navigation and shipping activities for the St. Lawrence Seaway. It lies within the Quebec City–Windsor Corridor along Ontario Highway 401, is a major port of entry from the United States into Canada, and is positioned to support some of Cornwall's largest industries, which include logistics, distribution, and call centres.

== History ==
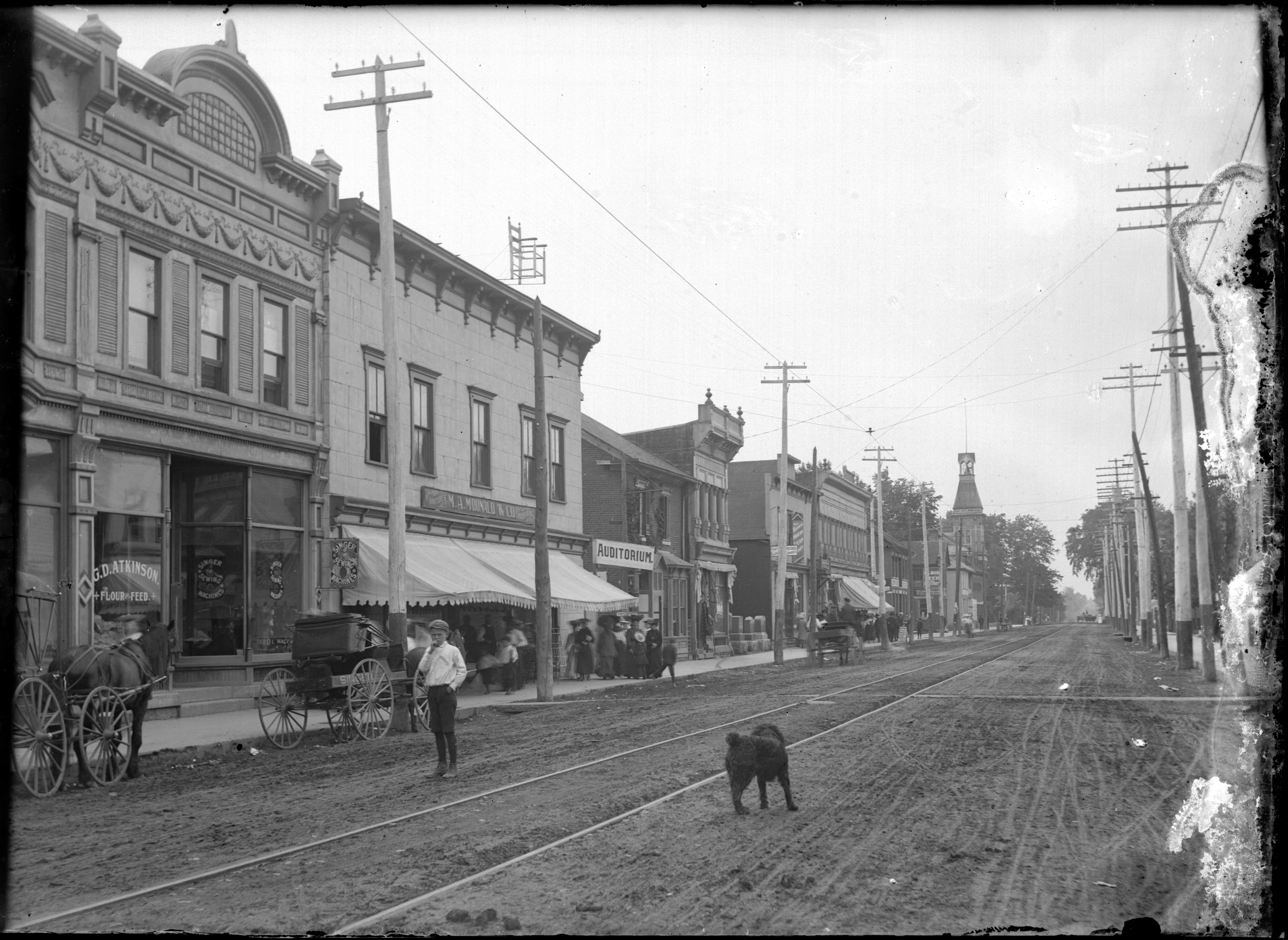
A dog on the street in front of G. D. Atkinson Flour and Feed, 208 Pitt St., Cornwall, c. 1908

Though accounts suggest Europeans filtered into the area and had scattered settlements for some time, the first documented European settlement was established in 1784 by United Empire Loyalists, primarily from the former British colony of New York. In 1787 this settlement became the first in present-day Ontario to be visited by a member of the royal family, Prince William Henry (later William IV).

After the war for US independence, former colonial soldiers loyal to the Crown and other disbanded soldiers and their families were afraid for their lives or uncomfortable in the newly independent United States became United Empire Loyalists as they were later called, and migrated to Canada.

The British government helped them settle throughout the Canadas as a reward for their loyalty and to compensate them for their losses in the United States. One of the chief settlement regions was the St Lawrence River Valley, from Kingston to Cornwall, which would later be known as "Loyalist Country."

Some began to settle at the site of Cornwall, which was then called New Johnstown. Here, many of the new arrivals were of ethnic German, Acts and English origin, and the town is named for Johnstown, New York, the origin of many of them.

The main group was led by Lieutenant-Colonel Sir John Johnson and had soldiers from the First Battalion King's Royal Regiment of New York and a contingent of the 84th Regiment of Foot (Royal Highland Emigrants).

They founded a permanent settlement north of one of a series of portage points (the point was not a settlement, nor was it even a trading post), sometimes referred to as Pointe Maligne by French explorers. The square mile town was temporarily named "Royal Town #2" then "Johnson" or "New Johnstown." It was later renamed to Cornwall for the Duke of Cornwall by the proclamation of Prince George. In 1834, the town became one of the first incorporated municipalities in the British colony of Upper Canada. Much later, during one of a series of annexations, those former portage points were added to the expanded community.

During the War of 1812, the Battle of Hoople's Creek and the Battle of Crysler's Farm were fought nearby. Cornwall was occupied by the United States Army from November 11–13, 1813.

The construction of the Cornwall Canal between 1834 and 1842 accelerated the community's development into a regional and industrial economic "capital" for a growing hinterland of towns and villages.

In 1846, the population was about 1,600, and there were many brick and stone houses, a stone courthouse and jail, and several government offices. There was little industry except for a foundry and two tanneries, but there were many independent tradesmen of various types. Other amenities included two bank agencies, eight taverns, and a ladies' school.

Canal and lock construction in the late 1800s and the early 1900s brought work and international business. The Grand Trunk Railway (CN Rail) built an east-west line through Cornwall in 1856. The New York and Ottawa Railway (NY&O) followed with a north-south line crossing the St. Lawrence, and a station in Cornwall dating to 1898. The Canadian Pacific Railway created a succession of subsidiaries and plans for a Cornwall line starting in the 1880s, which culminated in the Glengarry and Stormont Railway in 1915 to connect to CP's Ontario and Quebec Railway mainline to the northeast for an alternative route to Montreal.

In 1879, a visitor from Scotland enthusiastically declared that the Lochaber dialect of Scottish Gaelic language was better preserved, "with the most perfect accent, and with scarcely any, if any, admixture of English", in Glengarry County and in Cornwall than in Lochaber itself.

The railway connections linked Cornwall and local communities that required access to public services in Cornwall itself, such as high schools and medical services, and helped cement Cornwall's position as a regional centre for a large, rapidly expanding, and increasingly populated rural hinterland. The network of villages and towns surrounding Cornwall helped make the city a local entrepot for business, commerce, media and services.

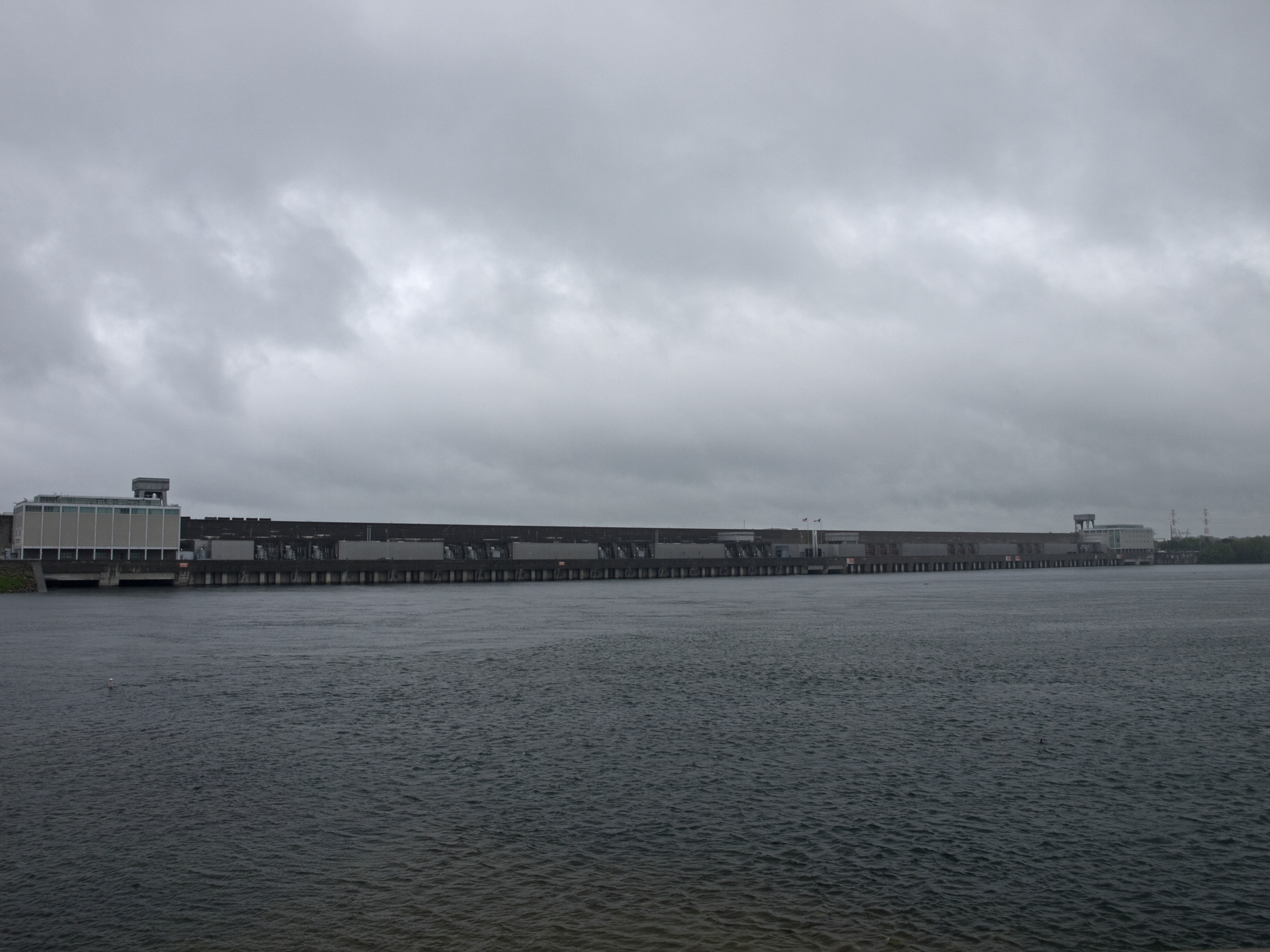
Moses-Saunders Power Dam

In 1944, the city was rocked by the magnitude 5.8 Cornwall–Massena earthquake. There were no deaths or injuries reported, but several chimneys were destroyed or damaged, along with heavy damage to historical masonry structures. For example, the Cornwall Collegiate and Vocational School received heavy damage from masonry work falling through the roof of the gymnasium. Part of the school had to be demolished and reconstructed.

West of Cornwall, along the St. Lawrence River, there were several smaller communities that became known as the Lost Villages. They were submerged in 1958 during the construction of the St. Lawrence Seaway, providing a reservoir for the Moses-Saunders Power Dam, which regulates water levels flowing from Lake Ontario and maintains the levels required to operate the two adjacent Canada-US hydroelectric power generating stations.

== Ethnic history ==
The post-contact regional population was a mixture of French Canadian, Ojibwe and Mohawk residents. Then came an influx of American Loyalists and refugees from the Thirteen Colonies, along with other French Canadian and Acadian migrants. Then poor Scottish and Irish immigrants and refugees who arrived from overseas and other parts of Canada. The different groups mixed and integrated over time, with family names and histories reflecting a blending of different backgrounds that became typical of Eastern Ontario.

Smaller but impressive contributions in the region were made by a host of other migrants, from Jewish traders, craftsmen, and merchants to Eastern European refugees and even a significant body of former slaves. Many of the stories go unreported in standard histories, which pass over the remarkable history of migration in the region. One good example is the story of John Baker, who died in Cornwall in 1871 at the age of 93. Born in Lower Canada, he was said to be the last Canadian born into slavery and had been an active soldier in the War of 1812 who fought in both Canada and Europe. Slavery was ended in the colony of Upper Canada in stages; in 1793, the importing of slaves was banned, and in 1819, Upper Canada Attorney-General John Robinson declared all slaves in the colony to be freed, making Upper Canada the first place in the British Empire and even the world that unequivocally moved towards the formal abolition of chattel slavery. Most of the former slaves settled and integrated into the same communities in which they were freed. By 1833, this process of liberation had succeeded throughout the British Empire by the decision to free all of its slaves. It was the first major state in world history to abolish slavery, and Ontario was the place where the process first bore fruit. John Baker, the last slave to be born into slavery in Canada, died in Cornwall.

"Canada" had been conquered from France after the Seven Years' War and included roughly the areas covered by Quebec and Ontario. In the aftermath of the American Revolution, the British authorities divided the Province of Canada in 1791 into two: Upper Canada for English settlers fleeing persecution in the United States and Lower Canada for the French. That was designed to accommodate Loyalists who had fled postwar reprisals and persecution in the new United States, but the 5,000 English-speaking settlers in the Eastern Township of Quebec were allowed to stay in the French-speaking area, and many French settlers moved into Ontario. Along with the area's original inhabitants, that made the area a patchwork of intersecting ethnicities that later greatly intermingled. Cornwall and the surrounding area, originally called "Royal Settlement #2" and then "New Jamestown," was initially a rough place and was largely left to its own devices. According to contemporary reports, that bred a local culture of intense self-reliance. Adding to the initial history of pragmatic entrepreneurialism, since very early with the founding of the city, provincial and federal governments have typically neglected the area and treated it as little more than a transit corridor. Those who remained in the region tended to be those who had the fortitude and the energy to survive on their own, with little outside assistance.

"The original 516 settlers arrived in Royal Township #2 with minimal supplies and faced years of hard work and possible starvation. Upon their departure from military camps in Montreal, Pointe Claire, Saint Anne, and Lachine in the fall of 1784, Loyalists were given a tent, one month's worth of food rations, clothes, and agricultural provisions by regiment commanders. They were promised one cow for every two families, an axe, and other necessary tools in the near future. For the next three years, bateaux (boat) crews delivered rations to the township, after which residents were left to fend for themselves."

The region's energetic spirit of enterprise and fortitude was well-known in the 19th century. David Thompson, the Welsh-Canadian explorer who mapped the Far West and was called the greatest land geographer in history, drew many of his travelling companions from Cornwall's rural hinterland, with Scottish and native settlers, and he lived in Williamstown.

More recently, Cornwall has seen an increase in the arrival of new immigrants, who tend to integrate and often fare better than immigrants in other parts of the country.

=== Integration ===
The Cornwall region was unusually integrated for rural counties in Ontario. For hundreds of years, the local population has been characterized by a mix of economic migrants, refugees, and opportunists. The mixing of different social classes and ethnic backgrounds was common even early in its history because of the interdependence demanded by isolation and the lack of support from or interference by official authorities.

The original Native population was welcoming, and the Iroquois were known for integrating newcomers into local societies and for adapting to change as it happened. Many people in the region have some Native ancestry as a result, and many communities sit on sites that have been occupied, farmed, or managed for hundreds of years. Some people were pushed out, but others blended into new communities in a process that would go on continuously over many generations.

The lack of strict hierarchy was a characteristic of the region. For example, from the 1780s to the 1830s, a "bee" was a social event that pooled local labour resources for people to come together for collective projects or to help out individual families, and it was often a festive occasion. The early "bees" presaged the development of a varied and integrated culture that ultimately drew on many different classes, backgrounds, and ethnic and linguistic groups, all of which were forced by the harsh reality of life in the region to work together for common goals, the primary of which was survival. The "bees" and different forms of collective shared labour were extremely common all over Eastern Ontario, especially in the early villages of the St. Lawrence Valley.

"In her book 'Roughing It in the Bush,' Susanna Moodie observed that 'people in the woods have a craze for giving and going to bees and run to them with as much eagerness as a peasant runs to a race.' Bees often involved all ranks and nationalities of society. Thomas Need, a sawmill operator in Victoria County, described in 'From Great Wilderness to Seaway Towns' the raising of his facility in 1834 in the following way: 'They assembled in great force, and all worked together in great harmony and goodwill notwithstanding their different stations in life.' These gatherings exhibited the lack of aristocracy in the rural loyalist settlement along the St. Lawrence River and residents' disregard for individuals' former social standing or lineage. The harshness and isolation of frontier living prevented the development of an aristocracy and, instead, united all members of the community in a struggle for survival. Early Loyalists, regardless of the amount of land they owned, depended upon the help of their neighbours to clear land, build homes, and share supplies and food during times of poor harvests."

== Geography ==
=== Environment ===
Cornwall does not enjoy a positive environmental reputation as a result of decades of industrial pollution in the city, the legacy of which is a riverfront contaminated by mercury, zinc, lead, and copper, soil contaminated by coal tar and byproducts, and most evidently, "Big Ben", an 18-hectare (44-acre), 80-metre-tall (260 ft) dumpsite within the city filled with wood bark, paper mill sludge, demolition waste and asbestos.

In September 2008, over public opposition and in spite of Ontario Ministry of Environment (M.O.E.) reports indicating off-site leachate impact from the dump and the likelihood of runoff to the St. Lawrence River, the M.O.E. permitted additional dumping at the "Big Ben" site of creosote and bitumen-contaminated soils from Domtar's former No-co-rode Ltd. site.

Although the area is touted as recreational, it is off-limits until winter when the waste is covered and the odours are subdued. It is then used as a ski hill.

Big Ben Dump in Cornwall

For years, the industrial emissions in the Cornwall area fuelled public health concerns about respiratory disease and cancer. In 1995 Health Canada reported the rate of hospitalization for asthma was approximately double that of Ontario industrial cities such as Hamilton, Sudbury and Windsor. Further research showed that infants under two years of age had four times the expected hospital admission rate for asthma. Lung and male rectal cancer rates were also elevated in comparison with the rest of the province.

The shutdown of the Courtaulds rayon fiber operation (1992) and the Domtar paper mill (2006) has been a significant factor in the city's improved air quality. Cornwall consistently ranks in the top 10 of 40 monitored communities across Ontario. More recently, a Pembina Institute study of 29 communities across Ontario examined a number of environmental, social, and economic factors. Cornwall ranked 13th overall, and its air quality was ranked #1 in the province.

Cornwall was at one point one of only two cities left in the Province of Ontario with only primary sewage treatment facilities. But construction was started in May 2012 on the secondary treatment level plant with the Governments of Canada and Ontario each covering one-third of an estimated $55.5 million construction cost. The City picked up the remaining one-third of the cost of $18.5 million. The secondary treatment level plant was completed in November 2014.

In 2006, the City updated its Strategic Plan, including the objective to develop an environmentally sustainable community.

In 2007, a former city councillor, Naresh Bhargava, began working with the St. Lawrence River Institute of Environmental Sciences on a project called the Community Carbon Reduction Initiative. City Council provided $5,000 in start-up funding for the project. Earlier progress in energy conservation was made when in 1995, the first municipally owned hot water district heating and cogeneration system in Canada went into operation, providing about 4% of the city's daily electrical needs while at the same time heating a number of buildings, including a hospital site, schools, and a municipal library. Cornwall converted all of its traffic signals in 2002 to energy-efficient LEDs that have reduced power usage by more than 600 kW—enough to light close to 70 homes. The data was contained in a report prepared by the city's public works department.

=== Climate ===
Similar to most of Southern Ontario, Cornwall has a humid continental climate (Köppen: Dfa) with cold, snowy winters and warm, humid summers. Precipitation is significant year-round, although the winter months are generally drier than the summer months.

Climate data for Cornwall (1991–2020 normals, extremes 1867–present)
Month	Jan	Feb	Mar	Apr	May	Jun	Jul	Aug	Sep	Oct	Nov	Dec	Year
Record high °C (°F)	18.0 (64.4)	18.0 (64.4)	26.0 (78.8)	31.0 (87.8)	35.6 (96.1)	35.6 (96.1)	37.8 (100.0)	36.5 (97.7)	34.5 (94.1)	28.5 (83.3)	24.0 (75.2)	20.0 (68.0)	37.8 (100.0)
Mean daily maximum °C (°F)	−3.8 (25.2)	−2.1 (28.2)	3.5 (38.3)	11.8 (53.2)	19.8 (67.6)	24.6 (76.3)	27.3 (81.1)	26.3 (79.3)	22.0 (71.6)	14.1 (57.4)	6.9 (44.4)	0.0 (32.0)	12.5 (54.5)
Daily mean °C (°F)	−7.8 (18.0)	−6.4 (20.5)	−0.9 (30.4)	6.9 (44.4)	14.3 (57.7)	19.3 (66.7)	22.2 (72.0)	21.2 (70.2)	16.9 (62.4)	9.7 (49.5)	3.3 (37.9)	−3.3 (26.1)	8.0 (46.4)
Mean daily minimum °C (°F)	−11.8 (10.8)	−10.6 (12.9)	−5.3 (22.5)	2.0 (35.6)	8.8 (47.8)	14.1 (57.4)	17.0 (62.6)	16.2 (61.2)	11.8 (53.2)	5.7 (42.3)	−0.3 (31.5)	−6.7 (19.9)	3.4 (38.1)
Record low °C (°F)	−43.3 (−45.9)	−36.1 (−33.0)	−32.2 (−26.0)	−18.3 (−0.9)	−6.1 (21.0)	0.6 (33.1)	3.3 (37.9)	1.7 (35.1)	−6.1 (21.0)	−9.4 (15.1)	−21.7 (−7.1)	−34.4 (−29.9)	−43.3 (−45.9)
Average precipitation mm (inches)	80.4 (3.17)	63.3 (2.49)	64.4 (2.54)	83.2 (3.28)	85.3 (3.36)	94.8 (3.73)	97.2 (3.83)	82.6 (3.25)	98.9 (3.89)	99.5 (3.92)	81.9 (3.22)	74.8 (2.94)	1,006.3 (39.62)
Average rainfall mm (inches)	30.2 (1.19)	16.7 (0.66)	28.1 (1.11)	71.9 (2.83)	85.3 (3.36)	94.8 (3.73)	97.2 (3.83)	82.6 (3.25)	98.9 (3.89)	98.9 (3.89)	66.4 (2.61)	38.2 (1.50)	809.2 (31.86)
Average snowfall cm (inches)	50.6 (19.9)	47.5 (18.7)	35.0 (13.8)	11.3 (4.4)	0.0 (0.0)	0.0 (0.0)	0.0 (0.0)	0.0 (0.0)	0.0 (0.0)	0.7 (0.3)	15.5 (6.1)	36.9 (14.5)	197.6 (77.8)
Average precipitation days (≥ 0.2 mm)	14.2	11.8	10.6	11.6	12.6	12.3	11.9	11.0	11.7	12.9	13.1	14.5	148.1
Average rainy days (≥ 0.2 mm)	3.8	3.1	5.0	10.6	12.6	12.3	11.9	11.0	11.7	12.6	10.4	6.2	111.2
Average snowy days (≥ 0.2 cm)	11.6	9.4	6.7	2.1	0.04	0.0	0.0	0.0	0.0	0.27	3.3	9.3	42.7
Mean monthly sunshine hours	85.3	114.8	153.0	166.2	209.9	241.2	274.1	229.7	163.7	129.9	75.6	61.0	1,904.3
Percentage possible sunshine	29.9	39.1	41.5	41.1	45.6	51.7	58.0	52.7	43.4	38.1	26.3	22.3	40.8
Source: Environment Canada (sun 1981–2010)

== Demographics ==
In the 2021 Census of Population conducted by Statistics Canada, Cornwall had a population of 47,845 living in 21,386 of its 22,214 total private dwellings, a change of 2.7% from its 2016 population of 46,589. With a land area of 61.5 km^{2} (23.7 sq mi), it had a population density of 778.0/km^{2} (2,014.9/sq mi) in 2021.

As of 2021, 9.9% of Cornwall residents were visible minorities, 5.6% were Indigenous, and the remaining 84.5% were white/European. The largest visible minority groups were South Asian (5.1%) and Black (1.7%).

In 2021, 66.3% of the population were Christian, down from 83.0% in 2011. 50.1% of residents were Catholic, 9.8% were Protestant, 3.4% belonged to other Christian denominations or Christian-related traditions and 3.1% were Christian n.o.s. 26.8% of the population were non-religious or secular, up from 12.1% in 2011. The largest non-Christian religion was Islam, accounting for 3.7% of residents, up from 2.4% in 2011. Hinduism was the second largest, at 1.8% of residents, up from 1.5% in 2011. All other religions and spiritual traditions accounted for 1.4% of the population.

Historical populations

Year	Pop.	±%
1921	7,419	—
1931	11,126	+50.0%
1941	14,117	+26.9%
1951	16,899	+19.7%
1956	18,158	+7.5%
1961	43,639	+140.3%

Year	Pop.	±%
1966	45,766	+4.9%
1971	47,116	+2.9%
1976	46,121	−2.1%
1981	46,144	+0.0%
1986	46,425	+0.6%
1991	47,137	+1.5%

Year	Pop.	±%
1996	47,403	+0.6%
2001	45,640	−3.7%
2006	45,965	+0.7%
2011	46,340	+0.8%
2016	46,589	+0.5%
2021	47,845	+2.7%

Population counts are not adjusted for boundary changes.
Source: Statistics Canada

Ethnic origin (2021)	Population	Percentage
French n.o.s	11,810	25.5%
Canadian	11,195	24.2%
Irish	7,490	16.2%
Scottish	7,210	15.6%
English	6,995	15.1%
French Canadian	2,780	6.0%
German	2,690	5.8%
Caucasian (White), n.o.s.	2,625	2.7%
First Nations n.o.s. + North American Indigenous, n.o.s.	1,935	4.2%
Italian	1,140	2.5%
Dutch	1,105	2.4%
British Isles n.o.s	1,050	2.3%
Mohawk	755	1.6%
Source: StatCan (includes multiple responses)

=== Language ===
As of the 2021 Census, 68.5% of the population reported their Mother Tongue as English, and 19.4% reported speaking French as their Mother Tongue. 38.2% of the population reported speaking both English and French, 60.6% spoke English only, and 0.8% spoke only French.

Mother Tongue (2021)
Language	Population	Percentage (%)
English	32,150	68.5%
French	9,110	19.4%
Non-official language	3,465	7.4%

Knowledge of Official Languages (2021)
Language	Population	Percentage (%)
English only	28,405	60.6%
French only	365	0.8%
Both English and French	17,915	38.2%
Neither English nor French	220	0.5%

== Economy ==
Cornwall has traditionally been a gateway from the Montreal area to the rest of Canada and was and remains a major port of entry into Canada (Canada Border Services abandoned the Cornwall Island post on May 31, 2009, but resumed service on July 13, 2009, at temporary facilities on the city's southern edge.) With the completion of the new low-level bridge connecting Cornwall to Cornwall Island, the C.B.S.A. port was moved to a permanent temporary facility on the canal lands. The city is connected to the United States at Roosevelttown near the municipalities of Massena, New York and Malone, New York via the Three Nations Crossing (Canada, Mohawk, and United States) which traverses the St. Lawrence River.

Cornwall was once home to a thriving cotton processing industry. Courtaulds Canada, Inc.'s viscose rayon manufacturing mill operated until 1992; at one point, it employed nearly 3,000 people. A Cellophane factory was opened in 1971 by British Cellophane, a subsidiary of Courtaulds, as an ancillary to the rayon plant, and traded successively under the names TCF of Canada Limited, BCL Canada Inc. and Courtaulds Films; it too closed in 1992. Domtar, a Quebec-based company, operated a paper mill in the city for nearly 100 years, ceasing operations on March 31, 2006. At its peak, Domtar employed nearly 1,500 employees. In addition, Canadian Industries Limited (C.I.L.) has operated a plant in Cornwall since 1935. The facility has been converted into a major derivatives plant. The site has a long history of mercury contamination, given that for decades the chloralkali process was carried out here. This entailed using used mercury cells to convert brine into caustic soda and chlorine.

Cornwall's industrial base has shifted to a more diversified mix of manufacturing, automotive, high-tech, food processing, distribution centres and call centres. The city hosts the largest supply chain management distribution centre in Canada, Walmart, its massive 1,500,000-square-foot (140,000 m^{2}) facility employing nearly 1,000 people. Target Canada built a new distribution centre in Cornwall's Business Park on a 169-acre (68 ha) parcel of land. The Target Canada distribution centre was operated by Eleven Points Logistics. When Target left Canada, its distribution centre was assumed by Walmart. StarTek (closed), and Teleperformance (closed January 2013) both operated call centres in Cornwall. Teleperformance provided in excess of 300 jobs. In late 2008, Shopper's Drug Mart built a 500,000 sq ft (46,000 m^{2}). distribution facility in Cornwall's Business Park. Over 130 new jobs resulted. Service Canada established a new contact centre which opened in 2010. Over 170 new jobs were created. Cornwall's unemployment rate was about 4% at the time.

Cornwall Square, also known as "The Square," is a two-level 250,000-square-foot (23,000 m^{2}) shopping mall in Cornwall on Water Street East, opposite to Lamoureux Park.

In 2016, Cornwall had the 11th-lowest household median income in Canada and the second-lowest in Ontario, at $51,712.

== Government ==
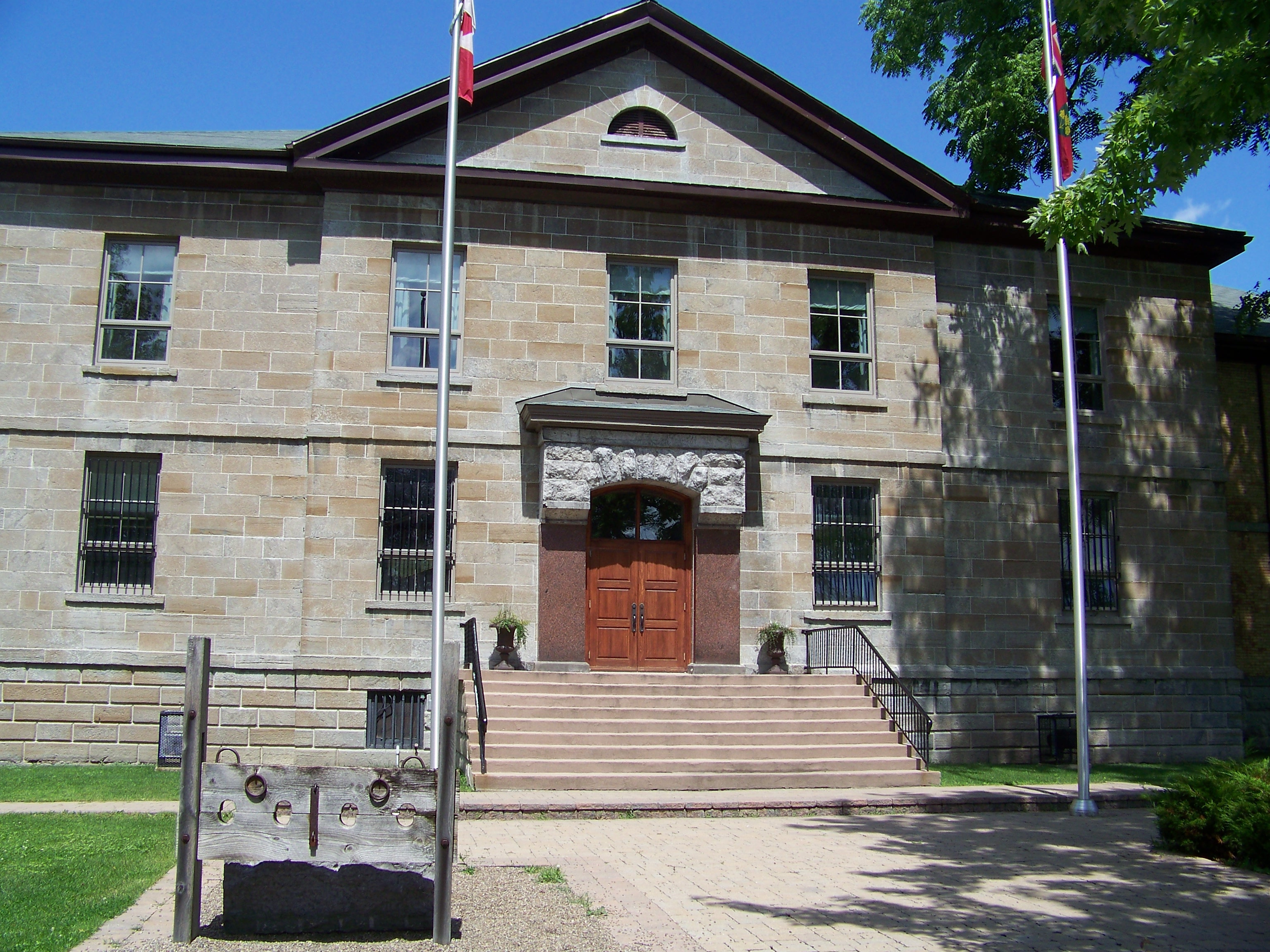
Historic Cornwall Jail, now County Courthouse

=== Municipal ===
The Cornwall City Council the elected eleven-member municipal government composed of a mayor and ten councillors who serve four-year terms and represent the city as a whole. The mayor of Cornwall is Sarah Good, having been elected in 2026, defeating Justin Towndale.

At the 2010 municipal election, 56.5% of eligible voters did not vote as out of 30,655 registered voters, only 13,338 cast ballots (43.5%).

=== Provincial ===
Cornwall is located within the Stormont—Dundas—South Glengarry riding, which is represented by MPP Nolan Quinn (Progressive Conservative Party of Ontario).

Cornwall provincial election results
Year	PC		New Democratic		Liberal		Green	
2022	52%	6,536	18%	2,249	20%	2,523	4%	499
2018	51%	8,052	28%	4,411	17%	2,631	4%	632

=== Federal ===
Stormont—Dundas—South Glengarry is represented federally by Member of Parliament (MP) Eric Duncan (Conservative). John Sandfield Macdonald, the first Premier of Ontario, was from Cornwall and is buried in St. Andrews West at the Catholic Church cemetery. A heritage plaque facing York Street at 211 Water Street West commemorates the 1897 launch of Cornwall's first permanent hospital in the former John Sandfield Macdonald house at that location.

Cornwall federal election results
Year	Liberal		Conservative		New Democratic		Green	
2021	30%	6,094	46%	9,212	13%	2,699	2%	406
2019	33%	6,849	43%	9,036	18%	3,696	4%	822

== Culture ==
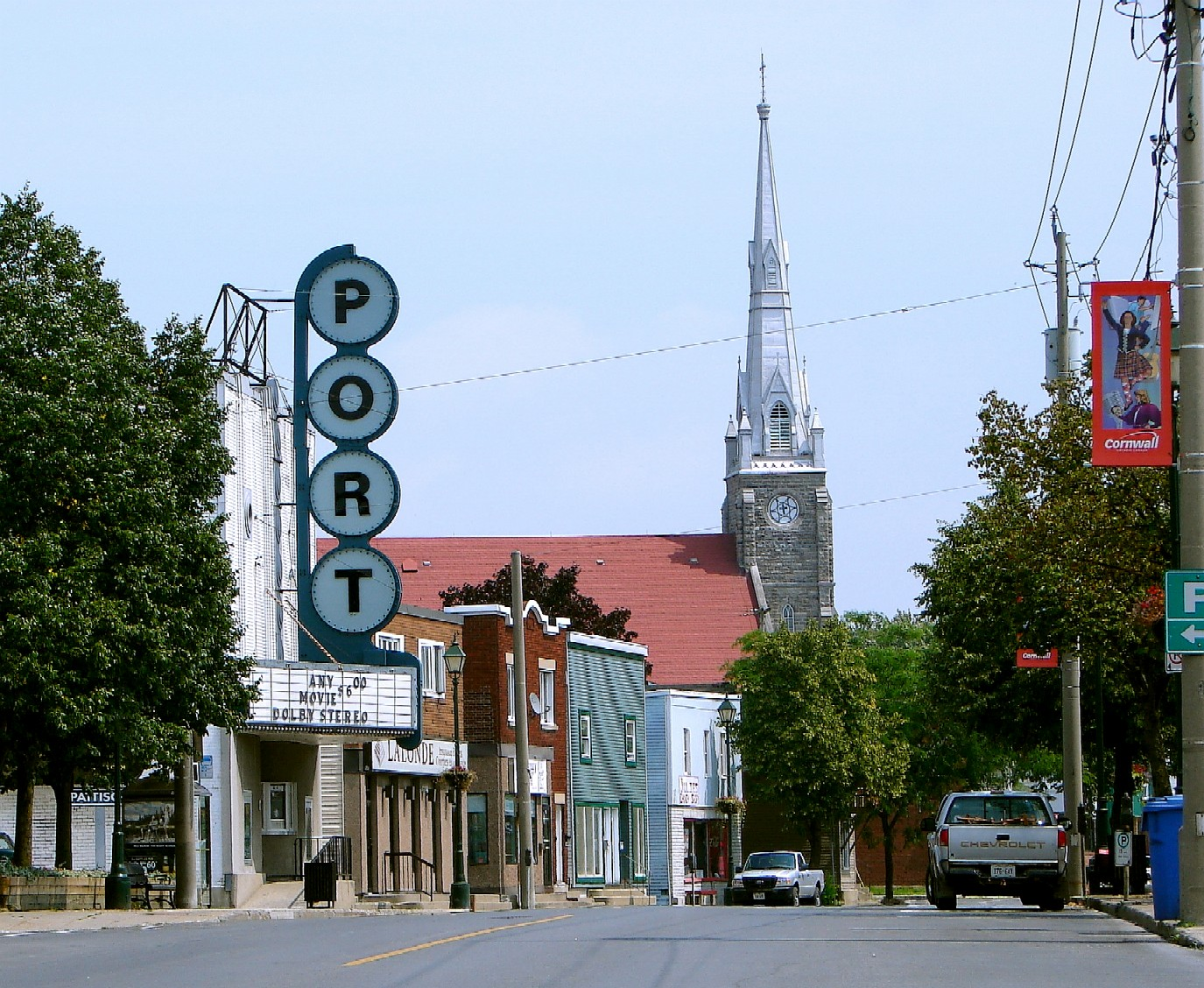
Port Theatre on Montreal Road

The City of Cornwall hosts festivals and special community events, including Canada Day festivities. In 2018, it purchased a building in the downtown core to house its arts and culture centre. The Focus Arts Association organizes multiple exhibitions and coordinates events where artists can connect with and support other artists. Your Arts Council, created to provide artists and the community with the tools and resources they need, offers programs aimed at promoting the work of local artists.

=== Theatre ===
The Aultsville Theatre, named after one of the Lost Villages, is a 680-seat performing arts centre on the St. Lawrence College campus and funded in part by the City of Cornwall. The Port Theatre, built in 1941, hosts movies and live music on its stage. Founded in 2006, the Seaway Valley Theatre Company offers plays, musicals, and comedy shows with cabaret-style seating.

=== Museum ===
Cornwall is home to the Cornwall Community Museum, which is operated by the SD&G Historical Society. In 2022, the United Empire Loyalists Association of Canada relocated its Dominion Office, library, and archives from Toronto to the museum.

=== Gallery ===
The Cline House Gallery offers Cornwall and the surrounding area rotating exhibitions of visual art featuring the work of both local and visiting artists. The Cailuan Gallery offers local artwork and an ongoing Special Selections exhibition.

=== Library ===
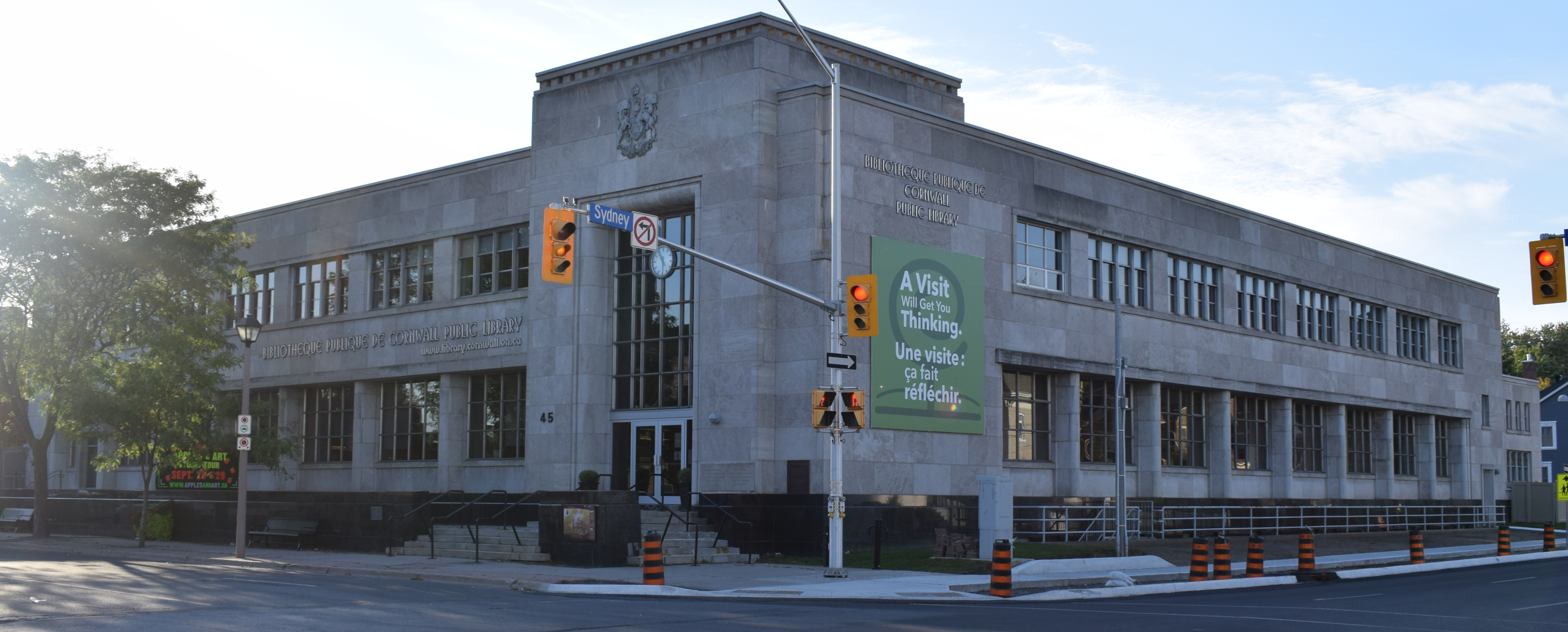
Cornwall Public Library

The Cornwall Public Library, located in the downtown core, is housed in the former 1953 Cornwall Post Office building, which was renovated and designated a heritage site by the Cornwall Municipal Heritage Committee in 1997.

=== Kinsmen Cornwall Lift-Off ===
Lift Off was an annual music and hot air balloon festival that took place in July in Lamoureux Park. It was run by a board of volunteers and was a non-profit organization. The event was the only hot air balloon festival in Ontario. Paying individuals could take a 20- or 90-minute ride in one of 25 sponsored balloons.

Kinsmen Cornwall Lift-Off promoted a variety of local and national talent. Acts included Glass Tiger, Theory of a Deadman, Marianas Trench, Our Lady Peace, Finger Eleven, Kim Mitchell, Sass Jordan, Tom Cochrane, Trooper, Burton Cummings, and David Wilcox. The 2014 lineup featured Great Big Sea's Alan Doyle, Glass Tiger and 54-40 as headliners. This edition was the first to offer a full day of free entertainment, with Glass Tiger headlining. It was attended by over 9,000 people.

2014 was the final year for the Lift-Off festival, as debt from a weather-plagued 2013 event and failure to obtain sponsors forced the cancellation of Lift-Off 2015 and resulted in a decision to discontinue the festival.

=== Ribfest ===
Cornwall Ribfest is an annual festival held by the Stormont Community Optimist Club. It was originally sponsored by the Cornwall Seaway Lions Club. Taking place over four days in late July, Ribfest attracts many for barbecue, beer tent, free live music and midway rides. The 2014 edition of the festival attracted 57,000–60,000 attendees, a number greater than the population of the city. In 2024 the Crash Test Dummies headlined the festival attracting visitors from across the province and upwards of 80,000 people over the weekend.

== Churches ==
Cornwall has a number of historic churches, some of which house some of the oldest congregations in the province.

=== Anglican Church of Canada ===
Trinity Anglican Church was founded in 1784 and was only the fourth Anglican church established in Ontario, the first being established only two years prior. Also known as Bishop Strachan Memorial Church, Trinity has had many noteworthy rectors, including its namesake, Bishop John Strachan, the first Bishop of Toronto. Trinity Church is currently a member church in the Area Parish of the Saint Lawrence in the Anglican Diocese of Ottawa. The current building was consecrated and opened in 1875.

Good Shepherd Anglican Church, also known as The Mountain Family Memorial Church, was established in 1886, but closed down in 2004. The congregation was relocated to the nearby Trinity Anglican Church.

=== Lutheranism ===
Originally established in 1962 as a mission congregation of the Lutheran Church in America, Saint Matthew's Lutheran Church was later incorporated into the Evangelical Lutheran Church in Canada (ELCIC) in 1986. Saint Matthew's Church later left the ELCIC and joined the Canadian Association of Lutheran Congregations (CALC). In 2025 the congregation voted to formally break fellowship with that group and join the Lutheran Church-Canada (LCC).

=== Presbyterian Church in Canada ===
Founded in 1787, local Presbyterians formed the new congregation of Saint John's Presbyterian Church under the leadership of the Reverend John Bethune. The current building dates to 1889 making it one of the oldest buildings in the city.

=== Roman Catholic ===
Cornwall is home to many Roman Catholic Churches:

Blessed Sacrament Roman Catholic Church

Co-Cathedral of the Nativity of the Blessed Virgin Mary

Precious Blood Roman Catholic Church

Saint Columban's Roman Catholic Church was founded in 1829 and its 176 foot (56m) spire can be seen from across the city.

Saint Felix de Valois Roman Catholic Church

Saint Francis de Sales Roman Catholic Church

Saint Peter's Roman Catholic Church

Saint Therese de Lisieux Roman Catholic Church

=== United Church of Canada ===
Knox-Saint Paul's United Church was the result of an amalgamation of two local churches: Saint Paul's Methodist Church (founded in 1792), and Knox Presbyterian Church (founded in 1846), during the founding of the United Church of Canada in 1925.

== Sports ==
Cornwall has two indoor arenas, the Cornwall Civic Complex and the Benson Centre, with three ice surfaces.

=== Hockey ===
Cornwall has been home to a variety of sports teams, the most notable of which was the Cornwall Royals hockey team. The Royals played in both the Quebec Major Junior Hockey League and the Ontario Hockey League before moving to Newmarket in 1992. The Royals won the Memorial Cup in 1972, 1980, and 1981.

From 1993 to 1996, the Cornwall Aces were an American Hockey League franchise, like the Cornwall Royals, that played at the Ed Lumley Arena in the Cornwall Civic Complex. They were the farm team for the National Hockey League franchises, the Quebec Nordiques and the relocated Colorado Avalanche.

The Cornwall Colts is the current Junior A team playing in the Central Canada Hockey League. Cornwall has hosted several major sporting events in its history, including the Ontario Winter Games and Special Olympics. In 2008, Cornwall hosted the Royal Bank Cup, the National Championship for Junior A hockey teams. The Cornwall Colts finished third in the series, winning 2 of 5 games. The Cornwall Colts hosted the Fred Page Cup in 2015 for the Eastern Canadian Championship. The teams represented in the Fred Page Cup are the Maritime Hockey League Champions (Kent Cup), the Ligue de Hockey Junior AAA du Québec Champions (Napa Cup), the Ottawa District champions of the Central Canada Hockey League (Bogart-Nielsen Cup), and a host team chosen by committee two years before the tournament.

The Cornwall River Kings of the Ligue Nord-Américaine de Hockey (LNAH) started playing out of the Cornwall Civic Complex in the fall of 2012 but folded in 2016. The River Kings were replaced by the Cornwall Nationals of the Federal Hockey League, which folded during the 2017–18 season.

=== Soccer ===
Cornwall has three soccer areas, the Kinsmen Junior Soccer Field at Second Street West and Haulage Road; The Benson Centre (for indoor soccer); and Optimist Park on Sunnyside Street and St. Michel Drive.

=== Rugby ===
Cornwall has competitive men's and women's rugby clubs. After many years without rugby in the community, it saw a resurrection in 2006. Both teams compete in the Eastern Ontario Rugby Union, which is located in Ottawa. The home of the Cornwall Crusaders Rugby Football Club is Cornwall Collegiate and Vocational School. The men's and women's teams practice Tuesdays and Thursdays from April until the end of August. The men's team won the Eastern Ontario Men's Division 1 Championship in 2009 and 2010 against the Napanee Outlaws and the Gatineau Mirage, respectively.

The sport of rugby continues to grow in the community. Many high schools throughout Stormont, Dundas, and Glengarry have junior and senior boys' teams as well as varsity girls' teams. These high school teams serve as feeders to the Cornwall Crusaders. Many of the players who play for the Crusaders come from high schools in the S.D.& G. area.

=== Roller derby ===
The Seaway Roller Derby Girls Association is the first roller derby flat track roller derby league in Cornwall and SD&G Counties, established in 2011. The Power Dames is the first official team.

=== Girls' basketball ===
The United Counties girls' basketball team won provincial and international basketball tournaments in the late 1970s and early 1980s. In addition, the city offered girls' and women's basketball from age eight to college graduates. The San Lawrence College women's team also won a college tournament. The teams were coached by Adelore Bergeon and Alan Haskvitz.

== Transportation ==
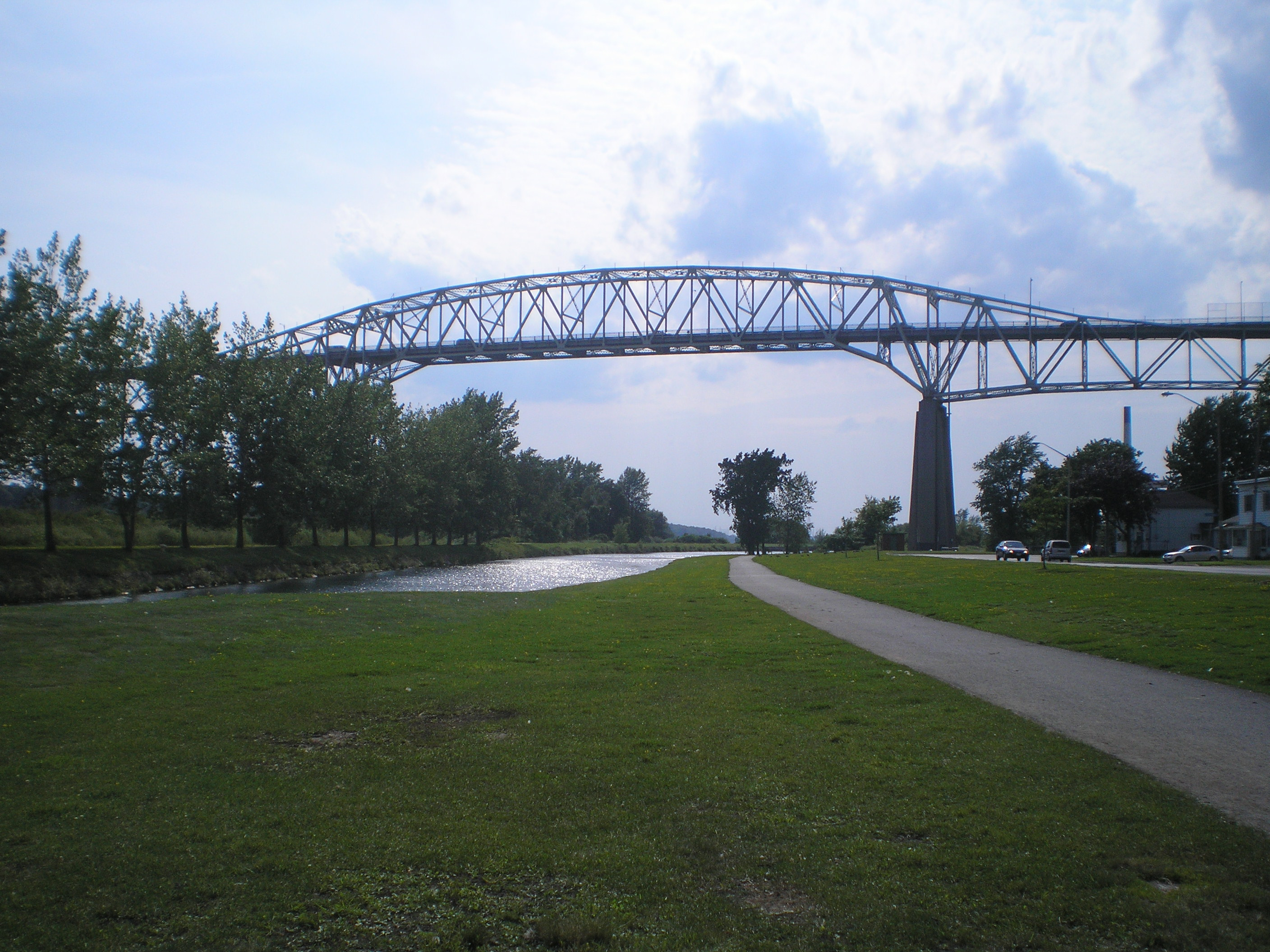
The north span of the Three Nations Crossing seen from Cornwall's west end. This bridge was torn down as it has been replaced by a much shorter low-level bridge to Cornwall Island.

=== Rail ===
The Grand Trunk Railway (CN Rail) built an east-west line through Cornwall in 1856, and its original station dated to that year. The New York and Ottawa Railway (NY&O) followed with a north–south line crossing the St. Lawrence, with a station in Cornwall dating to 1898. Canadian Pacific created a succession of subsidiaries and plans for a Cornwall line starting in the 1880s, culminating in the Glengarry and Stormont Railway in 1915, which connected to CP's Ontario and Quebec Railway mainline to the northeast, creating an alternative route to Montréal.

The expansion of the St. Lawrence Seaway in the 1950s significantly disrupted the city's rail infrastructure, resulting in CN relocating its line northward and the NY&O abandoning its line altogether. A new CN passenger station, which is still in use by Via Rail, was constructed in 1957, and the century-old Grand Trunk station was demolished shortly after, in 1962. The NY&O's passenger service ended in 1957, and its passenger station was demolished in the 1960s as well. CP passenger service ended even earlier, in 1952, and the CP passenger station was demolished in 1969. CP abandoned the line altogether in 1995.

Currently, Cornwall only has one significant rail line, the CN Kingston Subdivision, which functions as the CN mainline between Toronto and Montreal. It also serves as a component of Via Rail's Québec City-Windsor corridor. Passenger trains between Montréal and Toronto stop at the Cornwall railway station, which is located in the city's north end. Via's High-Frequency Rail (HFR) proposal, which would generally improve passenger rail service in Eastern Ontario, would not pass through Cornwall as most of the service improvements are planned to be focused on new lines constructed on abandoned rail rights of way as well as existing Via-owned lines such as the Via Brockville Subdivision.

==== Street railway ====
Around the turn of the 20th century, Cornwall had a burgeoning electric street railway system, which transported freight and passengers throughout the city. The Cornwall Electric Street Railway began passenger operations in 1896 and freight operations in 1899. Passenger operations ended in 1949 with a switch to trolleybus service, and electric freight operations ended in 1971 with the system's sale to CN Rail and subsequent dieselization. During its time, the street railway was significant in the city's social and industrial development. Ultimately, its passenger tram service, after conversion to trolleybus, became the present-day Cornwall Transit, which provides municipal diesel bus service to this day.

=== Public transit ===
With a fleet of 24 buses, Cornwall Transit operates six days a week (excluding Sundays and holidays) on fixed routes and supplementary rush-hour routes. In addition, there is an on-demand "Handi-Transit" service for the disabled. Cornwall Transit also contracts taxi service at a flat rate for Handi-Transit registrants who are ambulatory. The City-operated transit system transports approximately 860,000 passengers every year.

=== Air ===
Cornwall is served by the Cornwall Regional Airport, which is located 10 km (6.2 mi) east of the city near Summerstown. It is open year-round and licensed for day and night VFR IFR operations. The facilities include a 3,500 ft × 100 ft (1,067 m × 30 m) runway, a terminal, hangar, and the Canada Border Services Agency (on request). Domestic and international charter flying service from the airport is offered by Cornwall Aviation.

Massena International Airport in New York is 20 minutes by car from Cornwall.

=== Sea ===
The City of Cornwall is on the St. Lawrence Seaway just east of the Eisenhower and Snell Locks. The Cornwall Harbour and Government Wharf are located on the north bank of the St. Lawrence River in the city's east end.

== Education ==
Cornwall Collegiate and Vocational School became a grade 7–12 school after amalgamating with General Vanier Intermediate School for the 2011–12 school year. The school celebrated its bicentennial in 2006 and is one of the oldest schools in Canada. CCVS offers a complete French immersion program in grades 7–12.

St. Joseph's Secondary School is a part of the Catholic District Board and offers French immersion education. The newest high school in Cornwall is Holy Trinity Catholic Secondary School for grades 7 to 12, opened in response to overpopulation at St. Joseph's. Both schools offer French immersion education.

Cornwall also has two French high schools: l'École secondaire publique l'Héritage, and l'École secondaire catholique La Citadelle. La Citadelle is part of the Roman Catholic separate, French language school board for the Southeastern region of Ontario (CSDCEO). It is home to students from grade 7 to 12. École secondaire publique l'Héritage is part of the public school board responsible for education in the French language in Eastern Ontario (CEPEO) and is home to grade 7 through 12 students.

St. Lawrence Secondary School hosts students in grades 7–12. It was originally St. Lawrence High School, located where La Citadelle is now. Around 2003, it was turned into a school for grades 7–10. It has transitioned back into a high school for grades 7–12. 2012 was to be the first year since 2003 that grade 12s would graduate from the school.

The Statistics Canada 2016 census education profile indicates that 40% of Cornwall's population has a post-secondary certificate, diploma, or degree.

A campus of St. Lawrence College is situated in Cornwall. The St. Lawrence River Institute of Environmental Sciences is located on the college campus and, among other academic and vocational offerings, provides an Environmental Technician program. The St. Lawrence River Institute of Environmental Sciences is a research centre that carries out ecotoxicological studies on large river systems and, in particular, on the Great Lakes/St. Lawrence River ecosystem.

Al-Rashid Islamic Institute is the first Islamic school of any kind in North America, providing higher education in Islamic studies with a boarding facility.

The Seaway Valley Meat Cutting Institute is located in Cornwall and offers apprenticeship programs.

Cornwall is home to the Canadian Forces School of Aerospace Control Operations (CFSACO). CFSACO offers a range of basic and specialty courses and conversion training to Canadian Forces personnel. Military members are trained to become either Air Traffic Controller/Operators or Air Weapons Controller/Operators.

Nav Canada, Canada's air navigation service provider, formerly conducted training for domestic Air Traffic Controllers in Cornwall at the Nav Canada Training Institute and Conference Centre. The facility was purchased in March 2022 by the Devcore Group and rebranded as the DEV Hotel and Conference Centre. Nav Canada leases a portion of the property and continues operations on the site, hosting training for technical operations and leadership.

== Media ==
=== Radio ===
Frequency	Call sign	Branding	Format	Owner	Notes
FM 88.1	CHRI-FM-1		Christian	Christian Hit Radio Inc.	Rebroadcaster of CHRI-FM Ottawa
FM 92.1	CHOD-FM	92.1 GO FM	Franco-Ontarian community	La Radio communautaire Cornwall-Alexandria	
FM 95.5	CBOC-FM	CBC Radio One	Talk radio, public radio	Canadian Broadcasting Corporation	Rebroadcaster of CBO-FM Ottawa
FM 97.3	CKON-FM		First Nations community (from Akwesasne)		
FM 98.1	CBOF-FM-6	Ici Radio-Canada Première	news/talk	Canadian Broadcasting Corporation	French Rebroadcaster of CBOF-FM Ottawa
FM 101.9	CJSS-FM	Boom 101.9	Classic hits	Corus Entertainment	
FM 104.5	CFLG-FM	Fresh Radio	Hot adult contemporary	Corus Entertainment	

Some radio stations from other nearby areas, including Ottawa, Montreal and New York's North Country, are also available.

Defunct

- AM 1220 CJUL - Left the air in 2010
- FM 107.7 CIRG-FM tourist information

=== Television ===
- Channel 8: CTV CJOH-TV-8 (repeater of CJOH-DT Ottawa; formerly CJSS-TV)
- YourTV

=== Print ===
- Cornwall Standard-Freeholder is the city's main daily newspaper and is published by Sun Media, a division of Postmedia Network Inc.
- Seaway News is a weekly newspaper owned by TC Media and includes pages from the French-language L'Express.
- The Cornwall Seeker is a locally owned monthly newsmagazine distributed for free in stores and in print. Founded in 2010, it focuses on arts, culture, and events.
- The French-language newspaper "On a le choix" is a digital media outlet offering both print and audiovisual content. Since 2024, it has been the only local French-language news source in the region and publishes weekly news.

=== Internet ===
- Cornwall Free News

== Notable people ==
Some of the more famous people to hail from the Cornwall area include:

- Barstool Prophets, three of the four members (Glenn Forrester, Graham Greer, and Bobby Tamas) of the Canadian rock band hailed from Cornwall, where the band had its start
- Darby Bergin, 1st Canadian Surgeon General
- Malcolm Burn, musician and record producer
- Roger Caron, bank robber, author, and recipient of the 1978 Governor General's Award for English-language non-fiction for the book Go-Boy!
- Doug Carpenter, former NHL coach
- Solomon Yeomans Chesley, War of 1812 veteran; official with the Indian Department; Member of the Legislative Assembly of the Province of Canada; Mayor of Cornwall (1860–1861)
- Alain Chevrier, former NHL goaltender
- Lionel Chevrier, former Member of Parliament, son of former mayor Joseph Chevrier
- Donald Alexander Cochrane, composer
- Corbett Denneny, former NHL player
- Cy Denneny, brother of Corbett, former NHL player, in the Hockey Hall of Fame
- Lori Dupuis, Olympic gold and silver medalist in women's ice hockey
- Jacob Gallinger, United States politician
- Peter Gatien, New York nightlife impresario
- Lennie Goodings, Publisher, editor, author
- Ryan Gosling, actor
- Derek Grant, ice hockey player
- Christina Julien, former member of the Canadian national women's soccer team
- Chad Kilger, former NHL player
- Bob Kilger, former NHL referee, former mayor, former Member of Parliament, father of Chad Kilger
- Ed "Newsy" Lalonde, captained the Montreal Canadiens in the 1910s and helped the team win its first Stanley Cup in 1916
- Ed Lumley, former mayor, former Member of Parliament, Member of the Order of Canada
- Donald Alexander Macdonald, soldier
- John Sandfield Macdonald, prominent lawyer and the first Premier of Ontario
- Maggie MacDonald, playwright and musician
- Don McKay, Governor General's Award-winning poet and essayist
- Duncan McNaughton, gold medalist in the 1932 Olympics in the high jump
- Ray Miron, hockey player, coach, and executive, inducted into Cornwall Sports Hall of Fame
- Andre Payette, former AHL player
- Scott Pearson, former NHL player, drafted 6th overall to the Toronto Maple Leafs in 1988
- George Beverly Shea, noted gospel singer associated with Billy Graham crusades
- John Strachan, 19th-century Anglican priest and influential Bishop of Toronto
- Orval Tessier, former NHL player, coach of the Chicago Blackhawks and scout
- Colonel The Hon. Philip VanKoughnet, M.P., former landowner of Cornwall
- John Wensink, former NHL player
- Jesse Winchester, former NHL player

== Twin towns – sister cities ==
Cornwall is twinned with:

- Coventry, United Kingdom

== See also ==
- List of francophone communities in Ontario
- Royal eponyms in Canada
