= CFXM-FM =

Radio station in Granby, Quebec, Canada

Coordinates: 45°28′15″N 72°51′43″W

Granby, Quebec; Canada
- Frequency: 104.9 FM
- Branding: M105

Programming
- Language: French
- Format: Easy listening

Technical information
- Class: B
- ERP: 1.07 kWs average 4.29 kWs peak
- HAAT: 356.9 metres (1,171 ft)

Links
- Website: M105 online

CFXM-FM 104.9 MHz is a Canadian radio station that broadcasts a French language commercial easy listening format in Granby, Quebec. The station is branded as M105.

Licensed in 1997, the station is owned by La Coopérative de travail de la radio de Granby, which was founded by former employees of CHEF 1450, which ceased operations in 1996.
