= CKIN-FM =

Multilingual radio station in Montreal, Quebec, Canada

Coordinates: 45°30′11.16″N 73°35′48.12″W

- Montreal, Quebec; Canada
- Frequency: 106.3 MHz (HD Radio)
- Branding: Radio Diali

Programming
- Format: multilingual
- Subchannels: HD2: CHOU simulcast HD3: CKZW simulcast

Ownership
- Owner: Neeti P. Ray; (9427899 Canada Inc.)

History
- First air date: August 2010

Technical information
- Power: 394 watts
- HAAT: 194.4 metres (638 ft)

Links
- Webcast: Listen Live

CKIN-FM (106.3 MHz, "Radio CINA Montréal 106.3") is a radio station in Montreal, Quebec. Owned by Neeti P. Ray, the station broadcasts a multilingual format. The station primarily broadcasts in Arabic, with evening blocks carrying programming in Spanish, and hour-long blocks with programming in Assyrian, Berber, Cantonese, Italian, Hindi and Urdu. Its headquarters are at 1955 Côte-de-Liesse, Saint Laurent, with its transmitter located atop Mount Royal.

The station was originally established in 2010 by Canadian Hellenic Cable Radio (CHCR) as a sister station to CKDG-FM; it mirrored CKDG's format of carrying mainstream music programming during peak times (presented in French), and multicultural programming in the rest of the day. In 2015, the station was sold to Neeti P. Ray, after which the station revamped its schedule to focus primarily on Arabic programming.

In Spring 2026, the station began broadcasting in HD radio on 106.3-1.

== History ==
Former logo of CKIN-FM

On August 20, 2009, Canadian Hellenic Cable Radio Ltd. (CHCR) received Canadian Radio-television and Telecommunications Commission (CRTC) approval to operate a new multilingual specialty radio station at Montreal. The station would serve as a sister to CKDG-FM and use a similar format, under which it would air mainstream programming targeting French listeners during mornings and afternoon drive, and air programming in predominantly in Spanish, Creole, Arabic, Romanian, and Armenian among others throughout the rest of the day.

On May 20, 2015, Canadian Hellenic Cable Radio announced that they intend to sell CKIN-FM to Neeti P. Ray, who owns similarly-formatted stations CINA in Mississauga, Ontario, and CINA-FM in Windsor, Ontario. Ray previously sought licenses for a new station in Montreal twice (in 2007 and 2011), but was turned down in both instances. CHCR intended to use the sale to fund improvements to CKDG. Following the closure of the acquisition, CKIN was rebranded as CINA Radio (a brand shared by Ray's other multilingual stations), and launched a revamped schedule with a larger focus on Arabic and Spanish-language programming. Arabic programming constitutes the majority of its schedule on weekdays and weekends, while Spanish-language programming is aired during the evening hours on weekdays. Hour-long blocks with programming in other languages are carried on weekend mornings to comply with the requirement that CKIN air programming in at least eight languages other than English and French. The changes were meant to improve the viability of the station, as the Arabian and Hispanic communities are among the largest ethnic groups in Montreal. Its Arabic programming was aimed towards a younger audience than its main competitor, CHOU Radio Moyen-Orient.

The owners of CHOU filed a complaint with the CRTC over the shift to Arabic programming, arguing that Ray had promised to maintain CKIN's existing programming, while increasing its production of local South Asian programming. The CRTC dismissed the complaint on October 14, 2016, stating that neither CKIN-FM's license, or the approval of the sale, contained any conditions requiring the station to serve specific cultural groups—only that it must target at least six different groups, and air programs in at least eight different languages besides English and French. Its license has since been renewed through August 31, 2024.
