= CKDG-FM =

Multicultural radio station in Montreal

Coordinates: 45°30′10″N 73°35′46″W

- Montreal, Quebec; Canada
- Frequency: 105.1 MHz
- Branding: 105.1 Mike FM

Programming
- Format: Multilingual

Ownership
- Owner: Groupe CHCR Inc.

History
- First air date: April 17, 2004

Technical information
- Class: A
- ERP: 524 watts
- HAAT: 197.4 metres (648 ft)

Links
- Website: mikefm.ca

CKDG-FM is a radio station located in Montreal, Quebec, Canada. Owned and operated by Groupe CHCR Inc. (formerly Canadian Hellenic Cable Radio), it broadcasts on 105.1 MHz using a directional antenna with an average effective radiated power of 524 watts (class A).

The station broadcasts a multilingual format; on weekdays, the station broadcasts English-language morning and afternoon drive time programming focusing on classic hits music, while the remainder of its schedule is devoted to ethnic programs. Per its CRTC license, 60% of its programming must be ethnic programming, at least half of its programming must be in languages other than French and English, and it must carry programming that serves at least eight different cultural groups in at least six languages.

== History ==
The station was previously known as CHCR when it was on closed circuit cable for decades, before moving to full-fledged over the air FM in early 2004. The station received CRTC approval in 2003 to operate a new ethnic FM radio station in Montreal.

In 2009, the company received approval for a second station, CKIN-FM; this station would air a similar format to CKDG, but with its mainstream programming being in French instead. The station would later be sold to CINA Media Group in 2015.

In 2010, the CRTC renewed CKDG's license under an interim three-year term, citing a failure by the station to pay its mandatory contributions to Canadian content development, and imposing a condition requiring the contributions to be paid by August 2011.

In 2013, the license was renewed for another three-year term for its failure to pay the contributions, and for not submitting annual returns to the CRTC in a timely manner.

In 2016, the license was renewed for another three-year term, this time for insufficient broadcasting of Canadian music, and not sufficiently meeting its requirement to broadcast programming serving eight cultural groups (due to an erroneous classification of "English" and "French Québécois" as being cultural groups); the station's schedule had been amended in late-2015 to address this issue.

On April 1, 2024, former CTV Montreal entertainment reporter Mose Persico (who had been laid off due to cuts by Bell Media) became the station's new afternoon host.
