= 2014 Canadian honours =

Canadian government recognitions

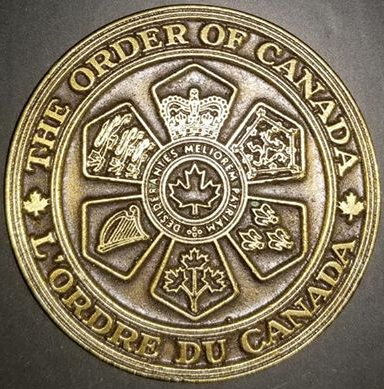
The Seal of the Order of Canada

The following are the appointments to various Canadian Honours of 2014. Usually, they are announced as part of the New Year and Canada Day celebrations and are published within the Canada Gazette during year. This follows the custom set out within the United Kingdom which publishes its appoints of various British Honours for New Year's and for monarch's official birthday. However, instead of the midyear appointments announced on Victoria Day, the official birthday of the Canadian Monarch, this custom has been transferred with the celebration of Canadian Confederation and the creation of the Order of Canada.

However, as the Canada Gazette publishes appointment to various orders, decorations and medal, either Canadian or from Commonwealth and foreign states, this article will reference all Canadians so honoured during the 2014 calendar year.

Provincial Honours are not listed within the Canada Gazette, however they are listed within the various publications of each provincial government. Provincial honours are listed within the page.

== The Order of Canada ==
=== Termination of an appointment within the Order of Canada ===
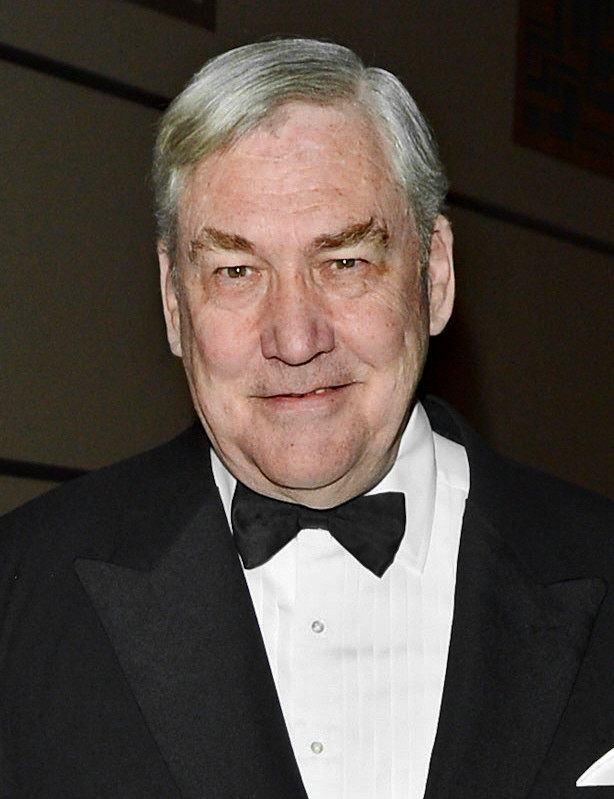
The Right Honourable The Lord Black or Crossharbour was removed from the Order of Canada and the Queen's Privy Council for Canada

- The Right Honourable Conrad Moffat Black, Baron Black of Crossharbour, KCSG
- Louis LaPierre

=== Companions of the Order of Canada ===
- The Honourable Marie Deschamps, C.C.
- The Right Honourable Donald Mazankowski, P.C., C.C., A.O.E. – This is a promotion within the Order
- The Honourable Margaret Norrie McCain, C.C., O.N.B. – This is a promotion within the Order
- R. Murray Schafer, C.C.

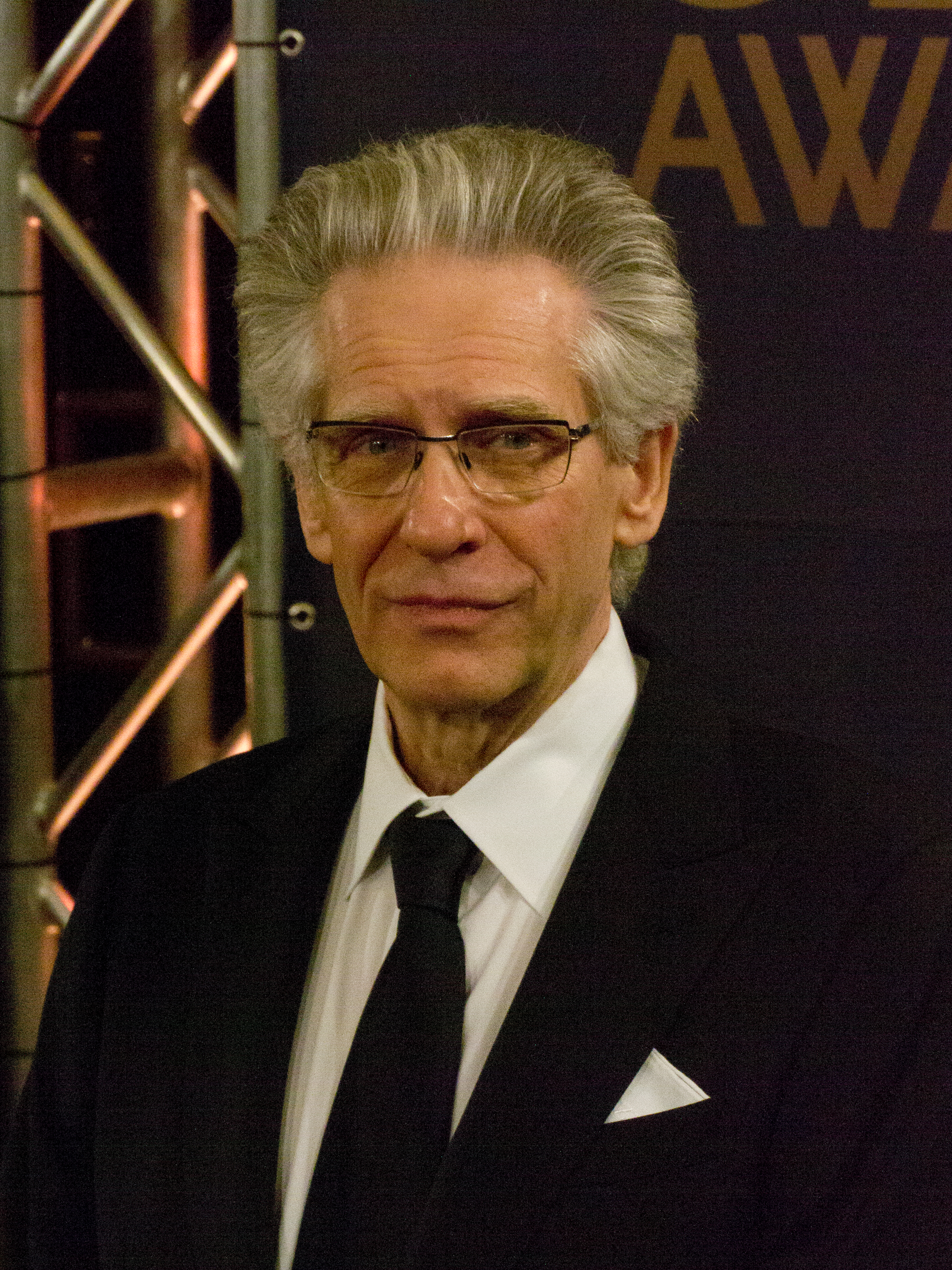
David Paul Cronenberg, CC, OOnt, FRSC, a new Companion of the Order of Canada

- David Cronenberg, C.C., O.Ont. – This is a promotion within the Order
- Richard Leigh Cruess, C.C., O.Q. – This is a promotion within the Order
- General Alfred John Gardyne Drummond de Chastelain, C.C., C.M.M., C.D., C.H. (Ret'd) – This is a promotion within the Order

=== Officers of the Order of Canada ===
- Michael Bliss, O.C. – This is a promotion within the Order
- Gilles Brassard, O.C.
- Douglas Coupland, O.C.
- Jim Cuddy, O.C.
- John Daniel, O.C.

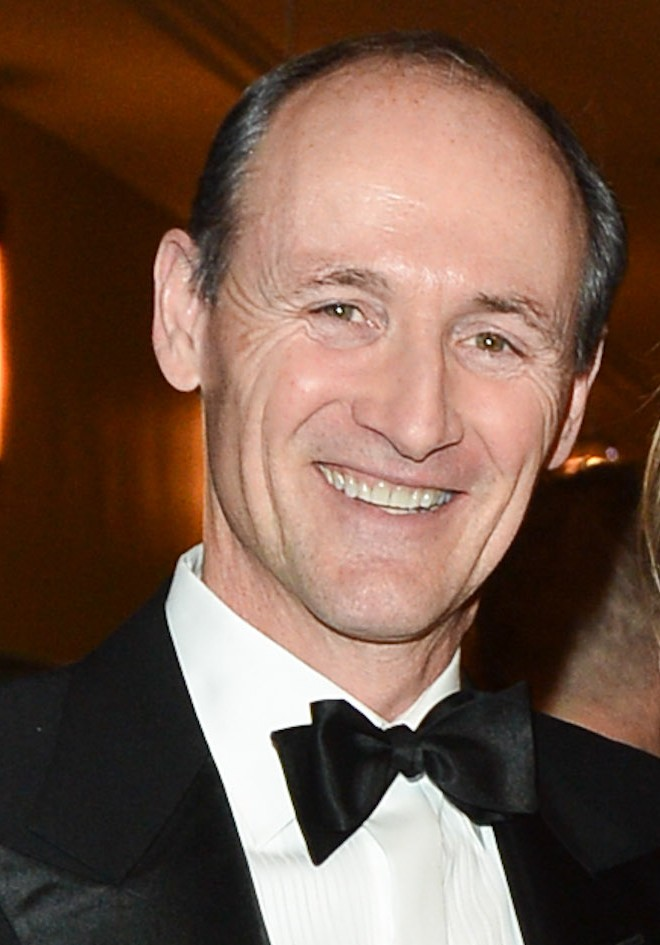
Colm Feore, Officer of the Order of Canada

- Colm Feore, O.C.
- Sherrill E. Grace, O.C.
- Nancy Jane Hermiston, O.C.
- Daniel Ish, O.C.
- David Jenkins, O.C.
- James Gregory Keelor, O.C.
- Patrick Delamere Lafferty, O.C.
- Steve Paikin, O.C.
- Eliot A. Phillipson, O.C.

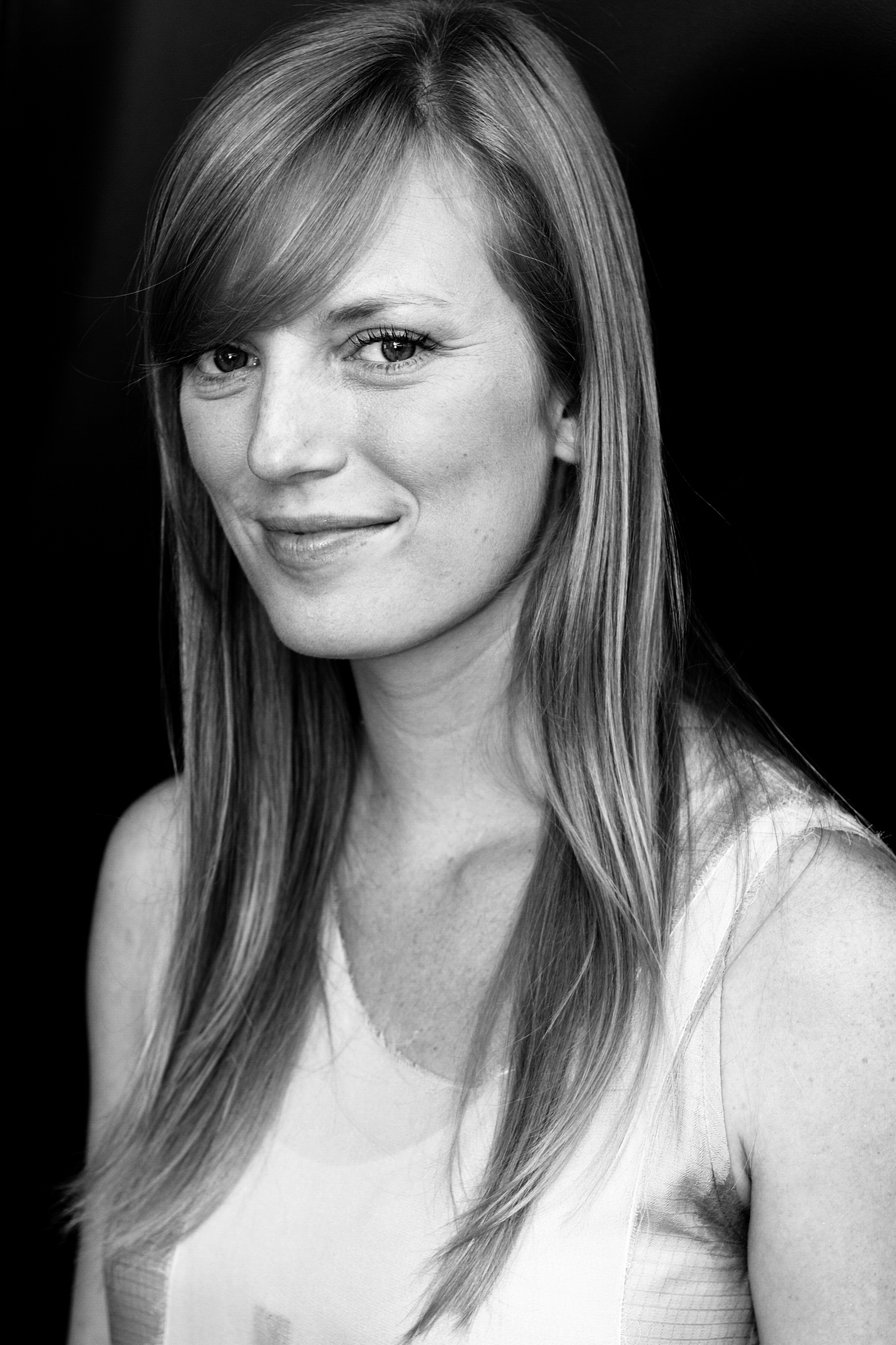
Sarah Polley, a new officer of the Order of Canada

- Sarah Polley, O.C.
- Glenn Pushelberg, O.C.
- Keren Rice, O.C.
- Hartley T. Richardson, O.C., O.M. – This is a promotion within the Order
- The Honourable J. J. Michel Robert, P.C., O.C.
- Michael Rudnicki, O.C.
- Daniel Walter Smith, O.C.
- John M. Thompson, O.C.
- Peter Tugwell, O.C.
- The Most Reverend V. James Weisgerber, O.C., S.O.M.
- George Yabu, O.C.
- Marion Bogo, O.C.
- Philip Branton, O.C.
- James Carter, O.C.
- G. Raymond Chang, O.C.
- Harvey Max Chochinov, O.C., O.M.
- Deborah Cook, O.C.
- Judson Graham Day, O.C., O.N.S., C.D.
- Jean-Marie De Koninck, O.C., C.Q. – This is a promotion within the Order
- David F. Denison, O.C.
- Gerald Finley, O.C.
- Susan French, O.C.
- David Goldbloom, O.C.
- Frederick William Gorbet, O.C. – This is a promotion within the Order

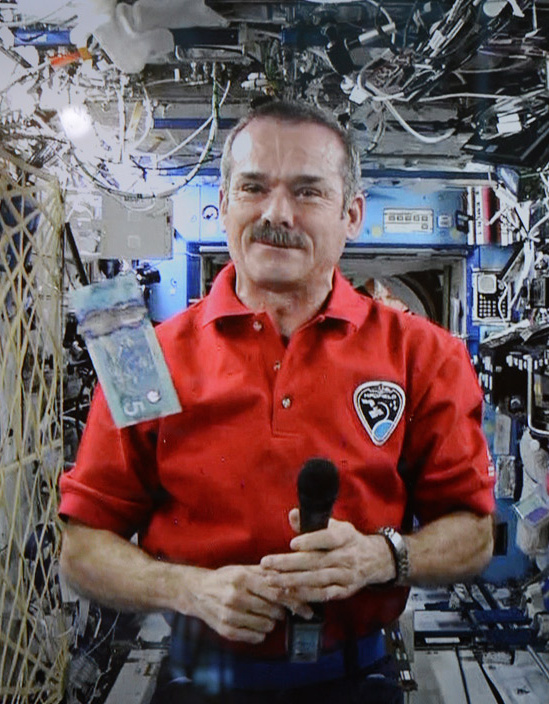
Colonel Chris Austin Hadfield, a new officer of the Order of Canada

- Colonel Chris Austin Hadfield, O.C., O.Ont., M.S.C., C.D. (Ret'd)
- Harold John Jennings, O.C.
- Norman B. Keevil, O.C., O.B.C.

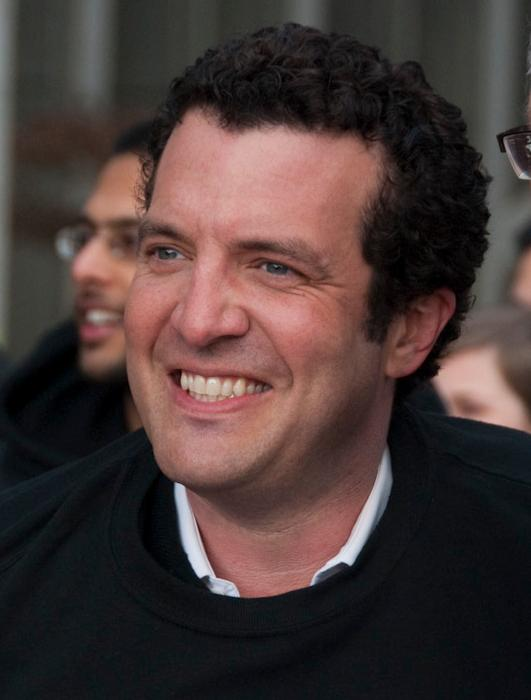
Rick Mercer, Officer of the Order of Canada

- Richard Vincent Mercer, O.C.
- Veena Rawat, O.C.
- Shirley Marie Tilghman, O.C.

=== Members of the Order of Canada ===
- Baha Abu-Laban, C.M.
- Ewan Affleck, C.M.
- Rina Arseneault, C.M.
- Louis Audet, C.M.
- Jeanne Beker, C.M.
- David F. Blair, C.M.
- Shirley Blumberg, C.M.
- Walter Boudreau, C.M., C.Q.
- Ron Burnett, C.M.

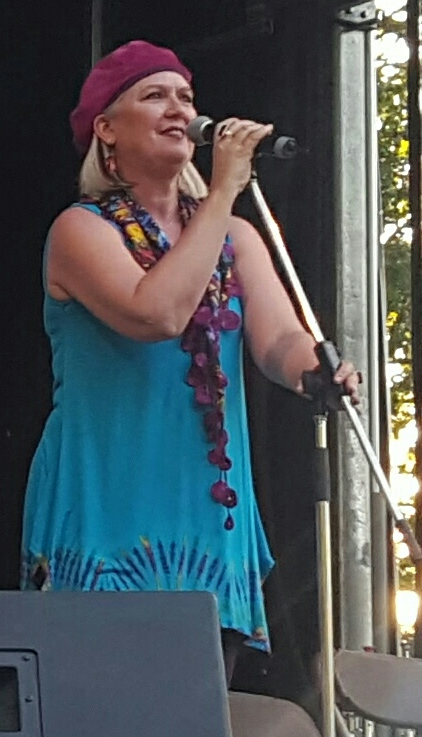
Carmen Campagne, Member of the Order of Canada

- Carmen Campagne, C.M.
- Paul G. S. Cantor, C.M.
- Stephen Carpenter, C.M.
- Denise Clarke, C.M.
- Dennis Cochrane, C.M.
- Marie-Éva de Villers, C.M., C.Q.
- Morton Doran, C.M.
- W. Yvon Dumont, C.M., O.M.
- Marc Dutil, C.M.
- Phil Dwyer, C.M.
- Louise Forestier, C.M.
- Madeleine Gagnon, C.M.
- Peter E. Gilgan, C.M., O.Ont.
- Michael Goldbloom, C.M.
- Philip R. Gosling, C.M.
- Bernard Grandmaître, C.M.
- Roger Greenberg, C.M.
- Catherine Anita Hankins, C.M.
- Morley Hanson, C.M.
- Robert Harding, C.M.
- Mary E. Hofstetter, C.M.
- James Dickinson Irvin, C.M.
- Elisapee Ishulutaq, C.M.
- George Jonas, C.M.
- Danielle Juteau, C.M.
- James Peter (Hamish) Kimmins, C.M.
- Lucia Kowaluk, C.M.
- Francine Lelièvre, C.M., C.Q.
- Douglas Letson, C.M.
- K. Barry Marsden, C.M.
- Murray D. McEwen, C.M.
- W. R. (Bob) McPhee, C.M.
- Djavad Mowafaghian, C.M., O.B.C.
- Wesley Nicol, C.M.
- Constance V. Pathy, C.M., C.Q.
- Juri Peepre, C.M.
- Louise Penny, C.M.
- John Derek Riley, C.M.
- Sandra Rotman, C.M., O.Ont.
- Aurel Schofield, C.M.
- Albert Schultz, C.M.
- Mamdouh Shoukri, C.M., O.Ont.
- Joan C. Snyder, C.M.
- Donald Creighton Rae Sobey, C.M.
- Eric S. Sprott, C.M.
- Jacques Tanguay, C.M.
- Ian Tannock, C.M.
- Tom Traves, C.M.
- Marie-José Turcotte, C.M.
- Sara Vered, C.M.
- William Robert Waters, C.M.
- Robin Williams, C.M.
- Mary Elyse Allan, C.M.
- Kim Baird, C.M.

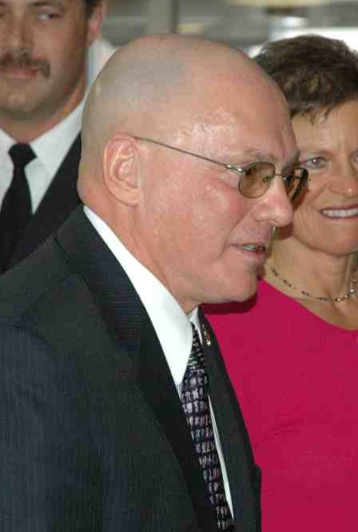
Former Lieutenant-Governor The Honourable Gordon Barnhart, member of the Order of Canada

- The Honourable Gordon L. Barnhart, C.M., S.O.M.
- James W. Borcoman, C.M.
- Brigadier-General Pierre G. Boutet, C.M., C.M.M., C.D. (Ret'd)
- Marcia Ann Boyd, C.M.
- Guy Breton, C.M.
- Vickie Cammack, C.M., M.S.M.
- Norman R. C. Campbell, C.M.
- Timothy W. Casgrain, C.M.
- Jean Chamberlain Froese, C.M.
- Earlaine Collins, C.M.
- Eleanor Collins, C.M.
- Victor Davies, C.M.
- Denise Desautels, C.M.
- François Dompierre, C.M.
- Terrence J. Donnelly, C.M., O.Ont.
- Anthony N. Doob, C.M.
- David K. Elton, C.M.
- Allan B. Etmanski, C.M., M.S.M.
- Lucinda Flemer, C.M.
- Cyril Basil Frank, C.M.
- Irene Fraser, C.M.
- Ross Gaudreault, C.M., O.Q.
- Christiane Germain, C.M., C.Q.
- Jean Giguère, C.M.
- Karen Goldenberg, C.M.
- Dorothy Grant, C.M.
- Jocelyn Greene, C.M.
- H. Wayne Hambly, C.M., O.P.E.I.
- Antony Holland, C.M.
- The Honourable James Knatchbull Hugessen, C.M.
- James D. Irving, C.M.
- Ronald L. Jamieson, C.M., O.Ont.
- Guy Gavriel Kay, C.M.

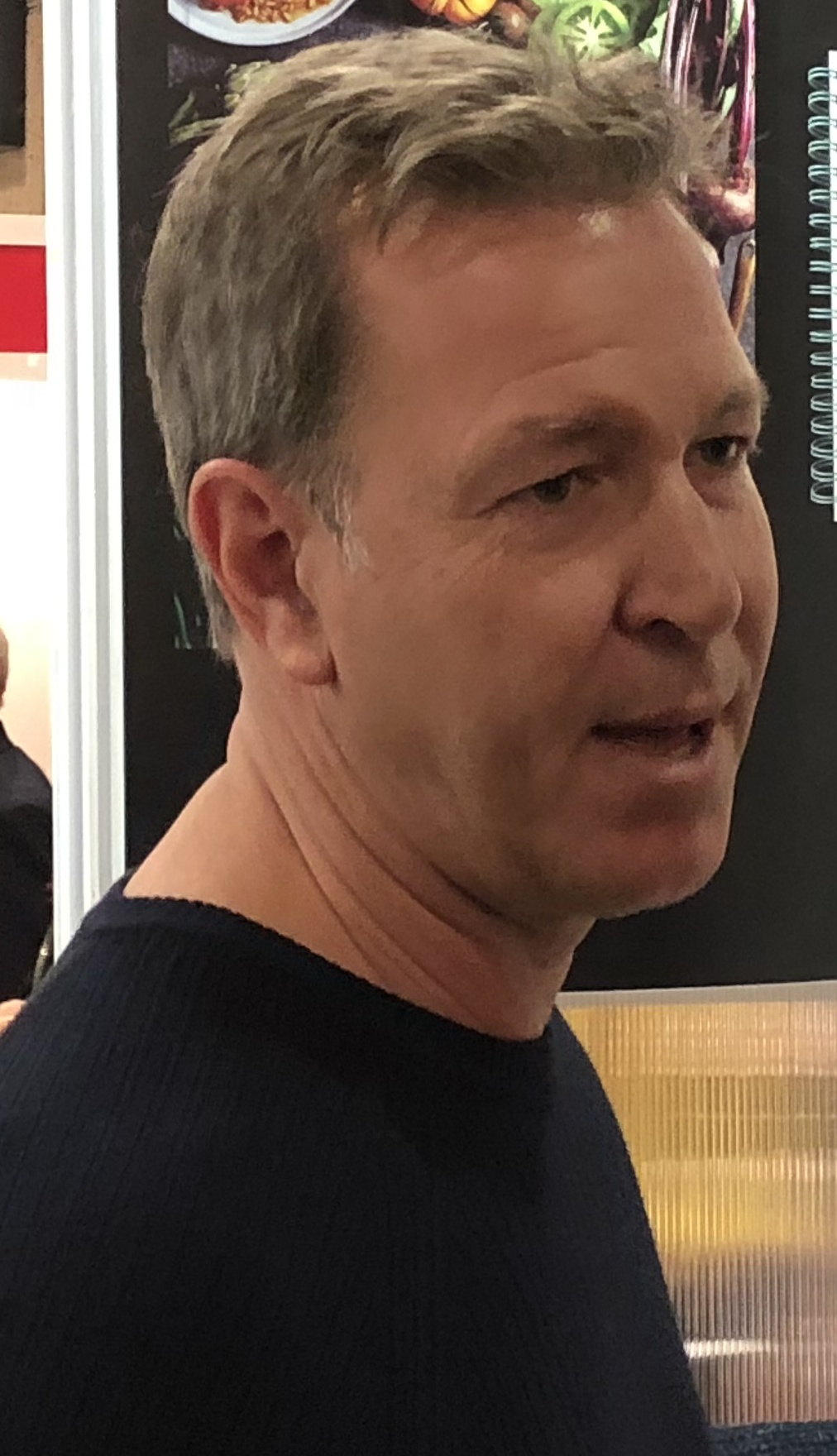
Ricardo Larrivée, member of the Order of Canada

- Ricardo Larrivée, C.M.
- James William Leech, C.M.
- Jack Long, C.M.
- James Low, C.M.
- The Honourable Edward Lumley, P.C., C.M.
- Ramona Lumpkin, C.M.
- Joseph B. Marshall, C.M., O.N.S.
- Carol Martin, C.M.
- Allison McCain, C.M.
- Frank L. McKinnon, C.M.
- Malcolm Bruce McNiven, C.M.
- James Armstrong Munro, C.M.
- Mona Nemer, C.M., C.Q.
- Kimberly Pate, C.M.
- Alexander Peter Pauk, C.M.
- Michel Phaneuf, C.M.
- Kari Polanyi Levitt, C.M.
- Shana Poplack, C.M.
- Marcia Hampton Rioux, C.M.
- Denise Robert, C.M.
- Ronald Rosenes, C.M.
- Roy Shephard, C.M.
- Karl Siegler, C.M.
- René Simard, C.M.
- Donna Eileen Stewart, C.M.
- Constance L. Sugiyama, C.M.
- Alan Robert Twigg, C.M.
- Fawn Wilson White, C.M.
- Norman Willis, C.M.

== Order of Military Merit ==
=== Commanders of the Order of Military Merit ===
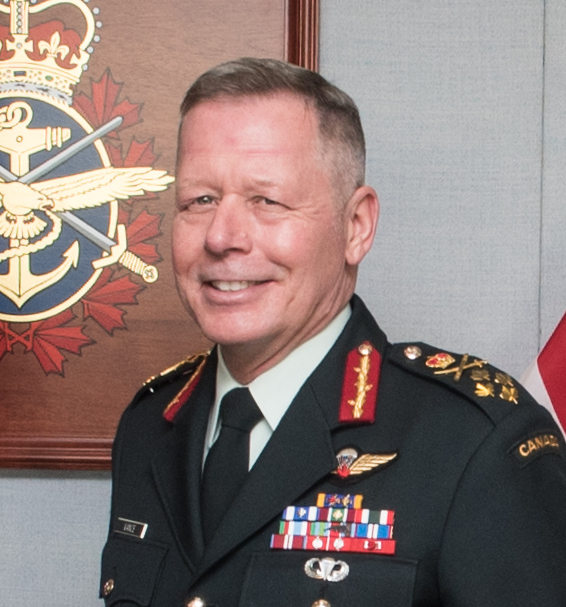
General Jonathan Vance, the current Chief of Defence Staff, was promoted as a Commander of the Order of Military Merit

- Major-General Stephen Joseph Bowes, C.M.M., M.S.C., M.S.M., C.D.
- Major-General Richard Douglas Foster, C.M.M., C.D.
- Rear-Admiral David Christopher Gardam, C.M.M., C.D. – this is a promotion within the Order
- Major-General David Byron Millar, C.M.M., C.D. – this is a promotion within the Order
- Lieutenant-General Jonathan Holbert Vance, C.M.M., M.S.C., C.D. – this is a promotion within the Order
- Major-General Paul Francis Wynnyk, C.M.M., M.S.M., C.D. – this is a promotion within the Order

=== Officers of the Order of Military Merit ===
- Colonel David James Anderson, O.M.M., M.S.M., C.D.
- Captain(N) John Robert Auchterlonie, O.M.M., C.D.
- Colonel Scott Norman Clancy, O.M.M., M.S.M., C.D.
- Colonel Howard Gerard Coombs, O.M.M., C.D.
- Major Joseph Jean Luc Charles Côté, O.M.M., C.D.
- Lieutenant-Colonel Robert Patrick Delaney, O.M.M., C.D.
- Colonel Christian Drouin, O.M.M., M.S.C., C.D.
- Lieutenant-Colonel Robert Bruce Ewing, O.M.M., C.D.
- Colonel Sean Friday, O.M.M., M.S.M., C.D.
- Lieutenant-Colonel Kelly Maria Gash, O.M.M., C.D.
- Colonel Simon Charles Hetherington, O.M.M., M.S.C., C.D.
- Lieutenant-Colonel Lyle Ronald Johnson, O.M.M., C.D.
- Colonel Vihar Govind Joshi, O.M.M., M.S.M., C.D.
- Colonel Joseph Rosaire Aimé Stéphane Lafaut, O.M.M., M.S.C., C.D.
- Brigadier-General Karl Desmond McQuillan, O.M.M., C.D.
- Commander Patrick Montgomery, O.M.M., C.D.
- Brigadier-General Matthew Keith Overton, O.M.M., C.D.
- Lieutenant-Colonel Louis-Henri Rémillard, O.M.M., C.D.
- Colonel Michael Norman Rouleau, O.M.M., M.S.C., C.D.
- Colonel James Carey Taylor, O.M.M., C.D.
- Colonel Carl Jean Turenne, O.M.M., M.S.C., C.D.
- Colonel Steven Joseph Russell Whelan, O.M.M., M.S.M., C.D.

=== Members of the Order of Military Merit ===
- Chief Petty Officer 1st Class Joseph Louis Pierre Auger, M.M.M., C.D.
- Master Warrant Officer Antony Shaun Batty, M.M.M., C.D.
- Chief Warrant Officer Joseph Deova Guy Richard Beauchamp, M.M.M., C.D.
- Master Warrant Officer Joseph Pierre Rock Boucher, M.M.M., C.D.
- Master Warrant Officer Ronda Lauran Bowman, M.M.M., C.D.
- Master Warrant Officer Raymond Joseph Brodeur, M.M.M., M.S.M., C.D.
- Petty Officer 1st Class Darcy Lee Leslie Burd, M.M.M., C.D.
- Master Warrant Officer Joseph Aubert Alain Caron, M.M.M., C.D.
- Major Christopher Kevin Catry, M.M.M., C.D.
- Chief Warrant Officer Gorden Roy Cavanagh, M.M.M., C.D.
- Sergeant Michel Félix-Alexandre Charette, M.M.M.
- Master Warrant Officer Troy Charles Chiasson, M.M.M., C.D.
- Warrant Officer Robin John Crane, M.M.M., M.M.V., C.D.
- Chief Warrant Officer Gary Alvin Crosby, M.M.M., C.D.
- Chief Petty Officer 2nd Class Thomas Alfred Curley, M.M.M., C.D.
- Warrant Officer Mark Victor Cushman, M.M.M., C.D.
- Warrant Officer Joseph Éric Michel D'Astous, M.M.M., C.D.
- Chief Petty Officer 1st Class Keith Edward Davidson, M.M.M., C.D.
- Master Warrant Officer Joseph Réal Richard Deschênes, M.M.M., C.D.
- Chief Warrant Officer Joseph Ralph Kevin Donovan, M.M.M., M.S.M., C.D.
- Chief Petty Officer 2nd Class Joseph Gérard Doucet, M.M.M., C.D.
- Warrant Officer Joseph Claude Éric Drouin, M.M.M., C.D.
- Petty Officer 1st Class Dale Thomas Durand, M.M.M., C.D.
- Major Terrance Michael Evoy, M.M.M., C.D.
- Master Warrant Officer Marie Carmen Chantale Gagnon, M.M.M., C.D.
- Chief Warrant Officer Terry Ronald Serge Joseph Garand, M.M.M., C.D.
- Chief Warrant Officer Cathy Alanna Gaudet, M.M.M., C.D.
- Chief Warrant Officer John Henry Graham, M.M.M., M.S.M., C.D.
- Captain Theresa Marie Green, M.M.M., C.D.
- Petty Officer 2nd Class Martin Harrisson, M.M.M., C.D.
- Master Warrant Officer James Matthew Hebert, M.M.M., C.D.
- Warrant Officer Éric Henry, M.M.M., C.D.
- Master Warrant Officer William Joseph Hinchey, M.M.M., C.D.
- Warrant Officer John Charles Hryniw, M.M.M., C.D.
- Warrant Officer Michael William Jackson, M.M.M., M.M.V., C.D.
- Chief Warrant Officer Carol Jalbert, M.M.M., C.D.
- Master Warrant Officer Christopher Percy Kane, M.M.M., C.D.
- Private William Kataquapit, M.M.M.
- Warrant Officer Suzanne Kavanagh, M.M.M., C.D.
- Chief Warrant Officer Michel Clément Kelly, M.M.M., C.D.
- Chief Petty Officer 1st Class Derek Kitching, M.M.M., C.D.
- Master Warrant Officer Carl Kletke, M.M.M., C.D.
- Master Warrant Officer Joseph Dominique Roger Jean Lafond, M.M.M., C.D.
- Warrant Officer Joseph Bertrand Steve Laforge, M.M.M., C.D.
- Warrant Officer Joseph Lionel Jacques Lamarche, M.M.M., C.D.
- Chief Warrant Officer Walter Allan Laughlin, M.M.M., C.D.
- Chief Petty Officer 1st Class Marie Line Laurendeau, M.M.M., C.D.
- Captain Joseph Ubald Yves Lesieur, M.M.M., C.D.
- Master Warrant Officer Michael Edward Lever, M.M.M., C.D.
- Chief Petty Officer 2nd Class Lawrence Lyver, M.M.M., C.D.
- Master Warrant Officer William Joseph MacInnis, M.M.M., C.D.
- Master Warrant Officer Peter Gregory Manuge, M.M.M., C.D.
- Warrant Officer Brent McDonald, M.M.M., C.D.
- Chief Warrant Officer Raymond Nicholas McEachern, M.M.M., C.D.
- Sub-Lieutenant Murray Milton McKnight, M.M.M., C.D.
- Chief Petty Officer 1st Class Michael John Miller, M.M.M., C.D.
- Master Warrant Officer Keith Paul Mitchell, C.V., M.M.M., M.S.M., C.D.
- Chief Petty Officer 2nd Class Barbara Alena Mondelli, M.M.M., C.D.
- Master Warrant Officer Leonard Thomas Murphy, M.M.M., C.D.
- Warrant Officer Erica Oliver, M.M.M., C.D.
- Master Warrant Officer Joseph Antoine Daniel Parenteau, M.M.M., C.D.
- Warrant Officer Robert Patten, M.M.M., C.D.
- Master Warrant Officer Joseph Roger Daniel Paulhus, M.M.M., C.D.
- Warrant Officer Melinda Elizabeth Pearson, M.M.M., C.D.
- Major Albert Mario Pelletier, M.M.M., C.D.
- Warrant Officer Guylaine Marie Alice Plamondon, M.M.M., C.D.
- Major Joseph Charles Sylvain Rhéaume, M.M.M., C.D.
- Master Warrant Officer Scott Stuart Robinson, M.M.M., C.D.
- Chief Warrant Officer Clarence Boyd Rose, M.M.M., C.D.
- Warrant Officer Glenn Rowlandson, M.M.M., C.D.
- Major Joseph Louis René Roy, M.M.M., C.D.
- Chief Warrant Officer Joseph Philemon Jean-Claude Sénécal, M.M.M., C.D.
- Warrant Officer Gerald Benjamin James Shaw, M.M.M., C.D.
- Major Ryan Denis Smid, M.M.M., M.B., C.D.
- Master Warrant Officer James Maurice Smith, M.M.M., C.D.
- Master Warrant Officer Matthew Michael Taylor, M.M.M., C.D.
- Master Warrant Officer Michael Richard Thompson, M.M.M., C.D.
- Warrant Officer Derek Ashley Thompson, M.M.M., C.D.
- Master Warrant Officer Louise Toussaint-Langlois, M.M.M., C.D.
- Master Warrant Officer Wayne Harold Trainor, M.M.M., C.D.
- Chief Warrant Officer Joseph Léo Stéfan Tremblay, M.M.M., C.D.
- Sergeant Lori Elizabeth Veitch, M.M.M., C.D.
- Chief Petty Officer 1st Class Michel Vigneault, M.M.M., C.D.
- Chief Warrant Officer Helen Gayle Wheeler, M.M.M., C.D.
- Sergeant Timothy Alexander Woznow, M.M.M., C.D.

== Order of Merit of the Police Forces ==
=== Officers of the Order of Merit of the Police Forces ===
Undress ribbon of an Officer of the Order of Merit of the Police Forces

- Deputy Chief Stephen Beckett, O.O.M.
- Chief Charles J. Bordeleau, O.O.M.
- Assistant Commissioner Kevin Charles Brosseau, O.O.M.
- Deputy Chief Trevor Daniel Daroux, O.O.M.
- Deputy Chief Constable Robert Alexander Downie, O.O.M.
- Chief Frank J. Elsner, O.O.M. – This is a promotion within the Order
- Director Michel Foucher, O.O.M.
- Director General Debra Frazer, O.O.M.
- Director Francis Gobeil, O.O.M.
- Chief Troy Hagen, O.O.M. – This is a promotion within the Order
- Deputy Chief Bruce Kenneth Herridge, O.O.M. – This is a promotion within the Order
- Chief Mark Douglas Mander, O.O.M.
- Chief Thomas Andrew McGrogan, O.O.M.
- Assistant Commissioner Gilles Michaud, O.O.M.
- Deputy Chief Murray William Stooke, O.O.M.

=== Members of the Order of Merit of the Police Forces ===
Undress ribbon of a Member of the Order of Merit of the Police Forces

- Chief Superintendent Michael E. Armstrong, M.O.M.
- Chief John T. W. Bates, M.O.M.
- Deputy Chief Lyle T. Beaudoin, M.O.M.
- Chief Jean-Michel Blais, M.O.M.
- Chief Superintendent Roderick Neil Callum Booth, M.O.M.
- Director Louis Bruneault, M.O.M.
- Inspector Kenneth Burton, M.O.M.
- Deputy Chief Mark Stephen Chatterbok, M.O.M.
- Detective Staff Sergeant Dominic S. C. Chong, M.O.M.
- Chief Superintendent Warren Paul Coons, M.O.M.
- Chief Superintendent Gary James Couture, M.O.M.
- Chief Superintendent Marlin A. Degrand, M.O.M.
- Director Michel Desgagné, M.O.M.
- Chief Officer Neil Dubord, M.O.M.
- Constable Stéphane Eid, M.O.M.
- Chief Leanne Jane Fitch, M.O.M.
- Sergeant Brian A. Foote, M.O.M.
- Chief Superintendent William Charles Fordy, M.O.M.
- Chief Inspector Mario Fournier, M.O.M.
- Sergeant Robert Joseph Stephane Gallant, M.O.M.
- Captain Frédérick Gaudreau, M.O.M.
- Detective Staff Sergeant Frank L. Goldschmidt, M.O.M.
- Superintendent Robert Gould, M.O.M.
- Superintendent Kevin Hackett, M.O.M.
- Chief Laurie L. Hayman, M.O.M.
- Superintendent Kenneth Wayne Heslop, M.O.M.
- Chief Superintendent Angela Louise Howe, M.O.M.
- Corporal Laurel Karen Kading, M.O.M.
- Deputy Chief Wayne Kalinski, M.O.M.
- Superintendent Daniel Kinsella, M.O.M.
- Chief Superintendent Scott Alexander Kolody, M.O.M.
- Staff Sergeant Darren Laur, M.O.M.
- Staff Sergeant Andre Pierre LeClair, M.O.M.
- Ms. Rita Lee-Irvine, M.O.M.
- Deputy Chief Allan R. Lekun, M.O.M.
- Chief Jean Paul Levesque, M.O.M.
- Chief Yung-Kai Liu, M.O.M.
- Chief Superintendent Peter Thomas Malo, M.O.M.
- Deputy Chief Constable Delbir Manak, M.O.M.
- Director Randy Mar, M.O.M.
- Superintendent Anne McConnell, M.O.M.
- Constable David McFadden, M.O.M.
- Chief Peter Joseph McIsaac, M.O.M.
- Superintendent Robin Emmanuel McNeil, M.O.M.
- Detective Inspector Thomas A. Murphy, M.O.M.
- Inspector Mark W. Neufeld, M.O.M.
- Detective Inspector Christopher A. Nicholas, M.O.M.
- Detective Inspector William Charles Olinyk, M.O.M.
- Chief Dennis James Poole, M.O.M.
- Superintendent Michael Duthie Porteous, M.O.M.
- Superintendent Gregory Robert Preston, M.O.M.
- Staff Sergeant Peter J. Quilty, M.O.M.
- Sergeant Supervisor Pascal Richard, M.O.M.
- Deputy Chief Frank Roselli, M.O.M.
- Superintendent Lorne Schwartz, M.O.M.
- Deputy Chief T. Brent Shea, M.O.M.
- Superintendent Jeffrey H. Sim, M.O.M.
- Deputy Chief Alban Gerard Singleton, M.O.M.
- Detective Inspector James M. G. Smyth, M.O.M.
- Ms. Florence Stewart, M.O.M.
- Deputy Chief Constable Leslie John Sylven, M.O.M.
- Superintendent John E. Tod, M.O.M.
- Chief Superintendent Larry Tremblay, M.O.M.
- Staff Sergeant Lynne Turnbull, M.O.M.
- Deputy Chief Desmond Walsh, M.O.M.

== Most Venerable Order of the Hospital of St. John of Jerusalem ==
Undress ribbon for all grades of the Most Venerable Order of the Hospital of St. John of Jerusalem

=== Knights and Dames of the Order of St. John ===
- Honorary Colonel Robert Harold Vandewater, MB
- Robert Hector White, ON

=== Commanders of the Order of St. John ===
- Kimberley Eyre, ON
- John Roland McDougall, AB
- Terry Lee Carter-Squire, MB
- Jean Kathryn Chute, BC
- Gary Gerald Corcoran, NL
- David John Griffiths, NL
- Edwin Holder, London, ON
- James Patrick Jeffries, C.D., MB
- Brent Donald Johnson, AB
- Honorary Colonel Susan Margaret Kathler, C.D., MB

=== Officers of the Order of St. John ===
- Sergeant Marc Joseph Luc Boucher, CD, QC
- Virginie Danielle Latour, NS
- Shaun McGrath, ON
- Raymond Ormerod, ON
- Second Lieutenant Owen Peter Patterson, NS
- Mervin Wayne Unger, BC
- Paul Lloyd Vienneau, NS
- Judith Anne Barker, ON
- Marika Lemstra Beaumont, ON
- Allan Burnell Bird, C.D., ON
- Master Warrant Officer William Mark Charlton, C.D., ON
- Sean Michael Large, ON
- Bonnie Jean McIntosh, ON
- Corporal Carolyn Kimberly Picard, ON
- Diane Margaret Rende, ON
- Superintendent John Paul Richards, MOM, BC
- Dawn Elizabeth Mary Roach, ON
- Joseph Bruce Varner, ON

=== Members of the Order of St. John ===
- Trent Latchman Akalu, ON
- Anna Catherine Armstrong, ON
- Kathy Lok Yin Au-Yeung, BC
- Brian James Belanger, ON
- James Bertoia, ON
- Michèle Brunette, ON
- Lieutenant-Colonel (Retired) Gary Ernest Burton, C.D., ON
- Patricia Lynn Ann Coleman, NS
- Christopher Dueck, ON
- Joyce Fowler, ON
- Captain John Colin Hodgson, AB
- Carol Ann Holland, ON
- Sam Kwok, ON
- Lieutenant-Colonel Henri Levasseur, C.D., QC
- Lieutenant-Colonel (Retired) Grant MacDonald, ON
- Patrick Lynn Martin, ON
- Jennifer Mayo, ON
- John Arnold Molyneaux, ON
- Shawn William Nutt, ON
- Pyer-Luc Parent, QC
- Sergeant Kristopher Neil Porlier, AB
- Matthew Rate, ON
- Robert Robertson, ON
- Cynthia Rodrigue, QC
- Earl Patrick Shea, ON
- Konrad Shum, BC
- Corporal Robert David Skelly, ON
- Ute Ellen Dagmar Teubner, ON
- Mary Dora Jean Woolrich, ON
- Laurie Anne Anderson, AB
- Kavitha Balaji, NT
- Mallory Jayne Black, MB
- Clarence Din Kwan Cheng, ON
- Judy Ann Chiu, BC
- Warren Mark Cook, BC
- Michelle Covi Haswell, ON
- Victoria Dorosch, ON
- Nancy Eunson, ON
- Shirley Ellen Evans, ON
- Commissioner Christopher Dorn Lewis, ON
- His Honour, the Honourable Doctor Donald Meredith, ON
- Danielle Andrea Million, AB
- Ross Nicholls, BC
- Tammy Kay Olsen, BC
- Richard Todd Pipe, ON
- Audrey Pryor, NL
- William Cox Reiach, ON
- Jennifer Susan Reiche, ON
- Kevin Rowe, NT
- Phyllis Elizabeth Schneider, ON
- Stefanie Simeone, QC
- Lieutenant(N) Lou Andrew Taddeo, C.D., ON
- Alexander Tsibulski, MB
- Roberta Helen Ursel, BC
- Robin Douglas Walker, ON
- Chris Wilson, NU
- Alexander Ka Kiu Yan, BC
- Constable Cecil Edward Young, ON

== Provincial Honours ==
=== National Order of Québec ===
==== Grand Officers of the National Order of Québec ====
Undress ribbon for a Grand Officer of the National Order of Québec

- Claude Béland, G.O.Q.
- Claude Castonguay, G.O.Q.

==== Honorary Grand Officer ====
- Kent Nagano, G.O.Q.

==== Officers of the National Order of Québec ====
Undress ribbon for an Officer of the National Order of Québec

- Manon Barbeau, O.Q.
- Louise Beaudoin, O.Q.
- Alain Bouchard, O.Q.
- Boris Brott, O.Q.
- Gabriel Filteau, O.Q.
- Ross Gaudreault, O.Q.
- Dany Laferrière, O.Q.
- Marguerite Mendell, O.Q.
- Benoît Pelletier, O.Q.
- Hervé Pomerleau, O.Q.
- Larry Rossy, O.Q.
- Madeleine Roy, O.Q.
- Denis Vaugeois, O.Q.

==== Knight of the National Order of Québec ====
Undress ribbon for a Knight of the National Order of Québec

- Yves Beauchamp, C.Q.
- Jocelyn Demers, C.Q.
- Hélène Desperrier, C.Q.
- François Dompierre, C.Q.
- Pierre Fortin, C.Q.
- Amina Gerba, C.Q.
- Georges-Hébert Germain, C.Q.
- Monique Giroux, C.Q.
- Joé Juneau, C.Q.
- Lucia Kowaluk, C.Q.
- Marie Lavigne, C.Q.
- Gérard Le Chêne, C.Q.
- Michel Lemieux, C.Q.
- Pauline Morrier, C.Q.
- Victor Pilon, C.Q.
- Barry Posner, C.Q.
- Her Worship Colette Roy Laroche, C.Q.
- Gilles Vincent, C.Q.
- Stanley Vollant, C.Q.

=== Saskatchewan Order of Merit ===
Undress ribbon for a member of the Saskatchewan Order of Merit

- No 2014 list (it is shared with 2015)

=== Order of Ontario ===
Undress ribbon for a member of the Order of Ontario

- Mary Anne Chambers – Cabinet Minister and MPP
- Ming-Tat Cheung – cardiologist and medical researcher
- Michael Dan – neurosurgeon and philanthropists
- Don Drummond – economist
- Rick Green – performer, writer and advocate for people with ADD
- Patrick Gullane – head and neck surgeon
- Joseph Halstead – civil servant and administrator
- Alis Kennedy – Métis leader
- Sylvie Lamoureux – teacher, scholar, and academic
- Gilles LeVasseur – lawyer, economist and professor
- Gary Levy – founding Director of the Multi-Organ Transplant Program at Toronto General Hospital
- Sidney B. Linden – former Chief Justice of the Ontario Court of Justice
- Barbara MacQuarrie – advocate for women's rights
- Eva Marszewski – founder and executive director of Peacebuilders International
- Marilyn McHarg – Co-founder and former executive director of the Canadian branch of Doctors Without Borders/Médécins Sans Frontières
- Hans Messner – scientist and physician
- James Murray – philanthropist
- Robert Nixon – former Minister of Finance and leader of the Ontario Liberal Party
- Dhun Noria – surgical pathologist
- Maryka Omatsu – retired Ontario Court Justice and Canada's first Asian-Canadian female judge
- Charles Pachter – artist
- John Ralston Saul – writer and lecturer
- Najmul Siddiqui – entrepreneur, community leader and philanthropist
- Jeffrey Turnbull – physician, humanitarian and medical director of Ottawa Inner City Health
- Dolores Wawia – pioneer in native education
- David Williams – Canadian astronaut, physician and scientist
- Warren Winkler – former labour lawyer, mediator and Chief Justice of Ontario

=== Order of British Columbia ===
Undress ribbon for a member of the Order of British Columbia

- David R. Podmore
- Douglas Coupland
- George Hungerford (2013)
- K. Barry Marsden
- John Brian Patrick Quinn
- Bob Rennie
- Chief Councillor Ellis Ross
- Dr. Aubrey Tingle
- Tung Chan
- Dr. John Cairns
- Dr. Roger Barnsley
- Dr. William (Bill) Clifford
- Dr. Gregory Fahlman (2013)
- Leslie Diamond
- Paul Lacerte
- Gloria Cuccione
- Dr. Hal Weinberg
- Dr. James Hogg
- Jane Hungerford
- Chief Chester Moore
- H. Anne Lippert
- Dana Brynelsen
- Peter Bentley
- Donald Lindsay
- The Honourable Leonard Marchand
- Rudolph North
- Lorne R. Segal

=== Alberta Order of Excellence ===
Undress ribbon for a member of the Alberta Order of Excellence

- Sharon Carry
- Tony Cashman
- Morris Flewwelling
- Colin Glassco
- Julia Hamilton
- Wilton Littlechild
- Fred Mannix
- Reinhard Mühlenfeld (* deceased)

=== Order of Prince Edward Island ===
Undress ribbon for a member of the Order of Prince Edward Island

- H. Wayne Hambly, CM
- Honourable H. Wade MacLauchlan, CM
- Heather Leanne Moyse

=== Order of Manitoba ===
Undress ribbon for a member of the Order of Manitoba

- Lorraine E. Brandson
- Robert Bryan Brennan
- Thomas Ralston Denton
- Donald Duguid
- Ronald (Sam) Fabro
- Raymonde Gagné
- Allan Gotlieb
- Israel Imoukhuede Idonije
- Bob Irving
- Jennifer Judith Jones
- Hermann Kar-Sang Lee
- Roland Penner
- Carole A. Vivier
- Doris Sarah Young

=== Order of New Brunswick ===
Undress ribbon for a member of the Order of New Brunswick

- Roger Augustine
- Wayne Curtis
- Lorraine Diotte
- Roxanne R. Fairweather
- Ivan Hicks
- Himanshu Kumar Mukherjee
- Guy A. Richard
- Cheryl Robertson
- Claude Snow
- Roch Voisine, O.C.

=== Order of Nova Scotia ===
Undress ribbon for a member of the Order of Nova Scotia

- Walter Marven Borden, C.M., O.N.S, DCL, DLitt
- Dr. Richard Ballon Goldbloom, O.C., O.N.S., BSc, MD, CM, FRCPC, DLitt, LLD
- Dr. Stanley Paul Kutcher, O.N.S., BA, MA, MD, FRCPC, FCAHS
- Dr. Wanda Elaine Thomas Bernard, C.M., O.N.S., PhD, RSW
- Ruth Holmes Whitehead, O.N.S., LLD

=== Order of Newfoundland and Labrador ===
Undress ribbon for a member of the Order of Newfoundland and Labrador

- Margaret Kearney
- Kevin St. George
- Sara Rita Sexton
- Colleen Kennedy
- Gilbert Linstead
- Dr. Jane Stuart Green
- Bridget Foster.

== Canadian Bravery Decorations ==
=== Star of Courage ===
Undress ribbon for the Star of Courage

- Master Corporal Shawn Gregory Bretschneider
- Sergeant Janick Joseph Benoit Gilbert, C.D. (posthumous)
- Master Corporal Marco A. Journeyman, C.D.
- Master Corporal Maxime Bernard Lahaye-Lemay
- Daniel Morrison
- Sergeant Daniel Villeneuve, M.B., C.D.

=== Medal of Bravery ===
Undress ribbon for the Medal of Bravery

- Marcus Lucas Alexander
- Julien Allard
- Larry James Angasuk Jr.
- Constable Andrew Robert Aucoin
- Sergeant Paul Charles Avanthay
- Kina Raven Beardy
- Clayton Joseph Beck
- Normand Bourgon
- Kevin Samuel Carras
- Constable Kevin Carroll
- Sheldon Charles Catholique
- Justin Tak Chan (posthumous)
- Constable Norbert Alexander Constant
- Pierre Davignon
- Magalie Dumoulin
- Constable James Arthur Elvish
- Sébastien Frappier
- Constable Todd Anton Ronald Glemser
- Adrien Grenier
- Dennis George Kerridge (posthumous)
- James Patrick Kitchen
- Devin Knot
- Juliette Rose Kokokons
- Joshua Lasas
- Warrant Officer Angel Margaret MacEachern, C.D.
- Brandon L. Manion
- Timothy Mason
- David Bruce Mayo
- Constable Susan McCormick
- Constable Clark McKever
- Jean-Paul Muir, C.D.
- Kelly Natomagan
- Logan Natomagan
- Carly Laura Nikirk
- Andrei Odorico
- Constable Kenneth Ogima
- Teddy John Allen Omilgoituk
- Brett Austin Opikokew
- Sergeant Jacob J. Perkins
- Constable Mark Reast
- Brennan Ellard Richardson
- Marko Romic
- Constable Jason Rybak
- Constable Stephen Lloyd Smulan
- Jonathan Storring
- Blaine Switzer
- Jonathan Thomason
- Giancarlo Torino
- Jason Daniel Totté
- Master Corporal Jean-François Vaillancourt
- Mark Van Sickle (posthumous)
- Donovan H. Vandestadt
- Jeffrey Wakeham
- George Thomas Ward
- William Dennis Ward
- Anthony Williams (posthumous)
- Corporal Scott Joseph Young
- Marcus Lucas Alexander
- Julien Allard
- Larry James Angasuk Jr.
- Constable Andrew Robert Aucoin
- Sergeant Paul Charles Avanthay
- Kina Raven Beardy
- Clayton Joseph Beck
- Normand Bourgon
- Kevin Samuel Carras
- Constable Kevin Carroll
- Sheldon Charles Catholique
- Justin Tak Chan (posthumous)
- Constable Norbert Alexander Constant
- Pierre Davignon
- Magalie Dumoulin
- Constable James Arthur Elvish
- Sébastien Frappier
- Constable Todd Anton Ronald Glemser
- Adrien Grenier
- Dennis George Kerridge (posthumous)
- James Patrick Kitchen
- Devin Knot
- Juliette Rose Kokokons
- Joshua Lasas
- Warrant Officer Angel Margaret MacEachern, C.D.
- Brandon L. Manion
- Timothy Mason
- David Bruce Mayo
- Constable Susan McCormick
- Constable Clark McKever
- Jean-Paul Muir, C.D.
- Kelly Natomagan
- Logan Natomagan
- Carly Laura Nikirk
- Andrei Odorico
- Constable Kenneth Ogima
- Teddy John Allen Omilgoituk
- Brett Austin Opikokew
- Sergeant Jacob J. Perkins
- Constable Mark Reast
- Brennan Ellard Richardson
- Marko Romic
- Constable Jason Rybak
- Constable Stephen Lloyd Smulan
- Jonathan Storring
- Blaine Switzer
- Jonathan Thomason
- Giancarlo Torino
- Jason Daniel Totté
- Master Corporal Jean-François Vaillancourt
- Mark Van Sickle (posthumous)
- Donovan H. Vandestadt
- Jeffrey Wakeham
- George Thomas Ward
- William Dennis Ward
- Anthony Williams (posthumous)
- Corporal Scott Joseph Young

== Meritorious Service Decorations ==
=== Second Award of the Meritorious Service Cross (Military Division) ===
Undress ribbon for a second award of the Meritious Service Cross in the military division

- Major-General Dean James Milner, O.M.M., M.S.C., C.D.

=== Meritorious Service Cross (Military Division) ===
Undress ribbon for Meritious Service Cross in the military division

- Captain Aaron Noble, M.S.C.
- Lieutenant General Daniel P. Bolger, M.S.C. (United States Army)
- Warrant Officer Joseph Claude Camille Pelletier, M.S.C., C.D.

=== Second Award of the Meritorious Service Medal (Military Division) ===
Undress ribbon for the Meritious Service Medal in the military division

- Chief Warrant Officer Daniel Joseph Laurendan Brissette, M.S.M., C.D.
- Colonel Gordon David Corbould, M.S.M., C.D.
- Colonel Joseph Albert Paul Pierre St-Cyr, M.S.M., C.D.

=== Meritorious Service Medal (Military Division) ===
Undress ribbon for the Meritious Service Medal in the military division

- Major Joseph Henri Christian Bergeron, M.S.M., C.D.
- Warrant Officer Joseph Damien Roger Bibaud, M.S.M., C.D.
- Major Scott Charles Alfred Bland, M.S.M., C.D.
- Brigadier General Jack L. Briggs II, M.S.M., (United States Air Force)
- Lieutenant-Commander Douglas Ian Campbell, M.S.M.,
- Colonel Kenneth Chadder, O.M.M., M.S.M., C.D.
- Lieutenant-Colonel Joseph Marcel Edmond Chevarie, M.S.M., C.D.
- Commander Jeffrey Campbell Climenhaga, M.S.M., C.D.
- Colonel Grant Fernand Dame, M.S.M., C.D.
- Colonel Peter Samson Dawe, M.S.M., C.D.
- Captain Gregory Alan Dixon, M.S.M., C.D.
- Captain Aaron Noble, M.S.M.
- Warrant Officer Allan Roy Upshall, M.S.M., C.D.
- Captain(N) Haydn Clyde Edmundson, M.S.M., C.D.
- Captain Islam Elkorazati, M.S.M.
- Colonel Philip Frederick Charles Garbutt, O.M.M., M.S.M., C.D.
- Colonel Michael Richard Gibson, M.S.M., C.D.
- Chief Warrant Officer Stuart Gordon Hartnell, M.M.M., M.S.M., C.D.
- Brigadier-General Douglas Craig Hilton, O.M.M., M.S.M., C.D.
- Petty Officer 1st Class Jeffery Kenney, M.S.M., C.D.
- Sub-Lieutenant David Ronald Lewis, M.S.M.
- Colonel Norman Peter Litterini, M.S.M. (United States Army)
- Lieutenant-Colonel Sylvain Ménard, M.S.M., C.D.
- Captain(N) Rebecca Louise Patterson, M.S.M., C.D.
- Lieutenant-Colonel Paul Gregory Pickell, M.S.M., C.D.
- Colonel Jean François Riffou, M.S.M., C.D.
- Chief Petty Officer 2nd Class Daniel William Rowe, M.S.M., C.D.
- Sergeant Jessie David Scheller, M.S.M.
- Captain Shane Alexander Smith, M.S.M., C.D.
- Colonel Gregory Ronald Smith, M.S.M., C.D.
- Major Leonard Kerry St. George, M.S.M., C.D.
- Captain(N) Douglas Michael Charles Young, M.S.M., C.D.
- Brigadier-General Todd Nelson Balfe, M.S.M., C.D.
- Chief Petty Officer 1st Class Robert Lee Brown, M.M.M., M.S.M., C.D.
- Chief Warrant Officer Martin Joseph Bruno Colbert, M.M.M., M.S.M., C.D.
- Lieutenant-Colonel John Stanley Fife, M.S.M., C.D.
- Colonel Paul Timothy Goddard, M.S.M., C.D.
- Lieutenant-Commander Christopher Daniel Holland, M.S.M., C.D.
- Major Mohamed-Ali Laaouan, M.S.M., C.D.
- Lieutenant-Colonel Joseph Christian Guy Leblanc, M.S.M., C.D.
- Corporal Clinton Jeffrey Lewis, M.S.M., C.D.
- Warrant Officer Michael David Mar, M.S.M., C.D.
- Captain Trevor Mark Pellerin, M.S.M., C.D.
- Lieutenant-Colonel Sean Patrick Lewis, M.S.M., C.D.
- Lieutenant-Colonel Stephen MacDonald, M.S.M., C.D.
- Chief Warrant Officer Gordon William Floyd Morrison, M.M.M., M.S.M., C.D.
- Lieutenant(N) Joseph Jocelyn Nadeau, M.S.M., C.D.
- Major Robin Kent Nickerson, M.S.M., C.D.
- Lieutenant-Colonel James Robert Ostler, M.S.M., C.D.
- Lieutenant-Colonel Roch Pelletier, M.S.M., C.D.
- Captain(N) Ronald Gerald Pumphrey, M.S.M., C.D.
- Warrant Officer Pasqualino Rizzo, M.S.M., C.D.
- Chief Warrant Officer Robert Joseph Thompson, M.S.M., C.D.
- Captain(N) Angus Ian Topshee, M.S.M., C.D.
- Colonel Peter Joseph Williams, M.S.M., C.D.

=== Secret appointments ===
- 8 March 2014: His Excellency the Right Honourable David Johnston, Governor General and Commander-in-Chief of Canada, on the recommendation of the Chief of the Defence Staff, has awarded two Meritorious Service Medals (Military Division) to members of the Canadian Special Operations Forces Command for military activities of high standard that have brought great honour to the Canadian Forces and to Canada. For security and operational reasons, recipients' names and citations have not been released.
- 20 December 2014: His Excellency the Right Honourable David Johnston, Governor General and Commander-in-Chief of Canada, on the recommendation of the Chief of the Defence Staff, has awarded two Meritorious Service Medals (Military Division) to members of the Chief of Defence Intelligence, and one Meritorious Service Medal (Military Division) to a member of the Canadian Special Operations Forces Command for military activities of high professional standard that have brought great honour to the Canadian Armed Forces and to Canada. For security and operational reasons, recipients' names and citations have not been released.

== Commonwealth and Foreign Orders, Decorations and Medal awarded to Canadians ==
=== From Her Majesty The Queen in Right of Australia ===
==== Australian Active Service Medal with International Coalition Against Terrorism Clasp ====
Undress ribbon for the Australian Active Service Medal

- Captain Carson Choy
- Captain Bradley Hardiman

=== From Her Majesty The Queen in Right of the United Kingdom ===
==== Companion of the Most Distinguished Order of Saint Michael and Saint George ====
Undress ribbon for all grades of The Most Distinguished Order of Saint Michael and Saint George

- Mr. Laurent Beaudoin, CC OQ CMG

==== Operational Service Medal with Afghanistan Clasp ====
Undress ribbon for the United Kingdom's Operational Service Medal for Afghanistan

- Major Andrew J. Webb
- Captain Alison Lucas

=== From the President of Austria ===
==== Grand Decoration of Honour for Services to the Republic of Austria ====
Undress ribbon for Grand Decoration of Honour for Services to the Republic of Austria

- Mr. Joel Bell

==== Decoration of Merit (Silver) ====
- Mr. Shawn Gibbons

=== From the President of the Republic of Chile ===
==== Grand Cross of the Order of Bernardo O'Higgins ====
Undress ribbon for the grade of a Grand Cross of the Order of Bernardo O'Higgins

- Mr. Lawrence David Lederman

=== From Her Majesty The Queen of Denmark ===
==== Knight of the Royal Order of the Dannebrog ====
Undress ribbon for the grade of a Knight of the Royal Order of the Dannebrog

- Mr. Kenn Harper
- Mr. Arne Nordtorp

=== From the President of the Republic of Finland ===
Undress ribbon for the grade of a Knight, 1st Class of the Order of the Lion of Finland

==== Knight, 1st Class of the Order of the Lion of Finland ====
- Mr. Patrick Kenniff

=== From the President of the French Republic ===
==== Knight of the National Order of the Legion of Honour ====
Undress ribbon for the grade of a Knight of the National Order of the Legion of Honour

- Mr. Reginald B. Allen
- Mr. Russel Bannock
- Mr. Eric Isaiah Bezanson
- Mr. Donald Joseph Bliss
- Mr. Frederick Brown
- Mr. Ronald William Butcher
- Mr. Archibald Donald Campbell
- Mr. Peter Goodwin Chance
- Mr. John Colson
- Mr. Ronald E. Cox
- Mr. James Andrew Crooks
- Mr. Albert E. Culley
- Mr. Marshall Thomas Desveaux
- Mr. Albert Doiron
- Mr. Roy Ernest Eddy
- Mr. James Francis Edwards
- Mr. Leonard William Fitzgerald
- Mr. Harold Andrew Furlong
- Mr. Walter Kenneth Georgeson
- Mr. Louis Godin
- Mr. Wilmore Stanley Hamilton
- Mr. Kenneth Charles Hanna
- Mr. Russell Frederick Hubley
- Mr. Lloyd Edward Hunt
- Mr. Raymond Donald Knight
- Mr. George Nicholas Kusyk
- Mr. Kenneth Charles Lett
- Mr. James Douglas Lindsay
- Mr. Rex C. F. Luckhart
- Mr. Paul Emile Maisonneuve
- Mr. William Martin
- Mr. Joseph Meagher
- Mr. Albert Henry Minnings
- Mr. James Moffat
- Mr. Reid Byron Myers
- Mr. Kenneth Owen Newell
- Mr. Earl Grant Nisbet (deceased)
- Mr. Edward James O'Halloran (deceased)
- Mr. John Harold Phillips
- Mr. Kenneth John Pratt
- Mr. John Walter Ross
- Mr. Roy Rushton
- Mr. Eugene Raymond Sanford
- Mr. Thomas Patterson Scade
- Mr. Arthur Britton Smith
- Mr. William G. Talbot
- Mr. William Wigglesworth Turner
- Mr. John Jack Vincent Watts
- Mr. Thomas Ross Wheler
- Note – 17 May 2014: The Government of Canada has also approved the award of the National Order of the Legion of Honour (Knight) to all other eligible Canadian veterans, approved by the Government of the Republic of France, who participated in the Allied Invasion of Normandy and Provence. This entitles the accepting and wearing of the decoration. The Chancellery of Honours will keep a record of the names of the recipients.
- Mr. Claude C. Boulanger

==== Officer of the Order of the Academic Palms ====
Undress ribbon for the grade of an Officer of the Order of the Academic Palms

- Mr. Réjean Boivin

==== Knight of the Order of the Academic Palms ====
Undress ribbon for the grade of a Knight of the Order of the Academic Palms

- Mr. Robert Boily
- Mr. Luc Bureau
- Ms. Linda Cardinal
- Ms. Christine Piette
- Mr. Vania Atudorei

==== Commander of the Order of Arts and Letters ====
Undress ribbon for the grade of a Commander of the Order of Arts and Letters

- Mr. Dany Laferrière

==== Officer of the Order of Arts and Letters ====
- Mr. Neil Young, O.C., O.Man
- Ms. Gail Dexter Lord
- Ms. Monique Giroux

==== Knight of the Order of Arts and Letters ====
- Ms. Chantal Pontbriand
- Mr. Douglas Coupland
- Ms. Josette Deslauriers Normandeau
- Ms. Diana Krall
- Mr. Guy Mignault
- Mr. Anthony Phelps
- Mr. Serge Thibodeau
- Mr. Jean-Marc Vallée
- Mr. Ian Wallace

==== National Defence Medal, Bronze Echelon ====
- Major Claudie Thériault

==== Medal of Honour of Labour, Grand Gold Echelon ====
- Mr. Armand Essiminy

=== From the President of the Federal Republic of Germany ===
==== Grand Cross 1st Class of the Order of Merit of the Federal Republic of Germany ====
- The Honourable Noël A. Kinsella, P.C.

==== Cross of the Order of Merit of the Federal Republic of Germany ====
- Ms. Annemarie Heinze
- Professor Henry Horst Mantsch

=== From the President of Hungary ===
==== Commander's Cross of the Order of Merit of Hungary (civil division) ====
- Professor József Tóth
- Mr. Gábor Finta

=== From the President of the Republic of Italy ===
==== Commander of the Order of Merit of the Republic of Italy ====
- Mr. Howard Alper

=== From His Majesty The Emperor of Japan ===
==== Order of the Rising Sun, Gold Rays with Rosette ====
- Her Worship Hazel McCallion

==== Order of the Rising Sun, Gold Rays with Neck Ribbon ====
- Mr. Michael Wade Donnelly

=== From His Majesty The King of the Netherlands ===
==== Inauguration Medal (2013) ====
- Master Warrant Officer Daryl Wayne Corbett
- Major Timothy McClure
- Warrant Officer John Alexander Toth

=== From the Secretary General of the North Atlantic Treaty Organization ===
==== NATO Meritorious Service Medal ====
- Mr. Zobair David Deen
- Colonel Paul Fleury
- Lieutenant-General Marquis Hainse
- Colonel Peter Scott
- Mr. Scott Bruce
- Master Warrant Officer Shaun Patrick Prendergast
- Lieutenant-Commander Dale Turetski

=== From the President of the Republic of Poland ===
==== Commander's Cross of the Order of Merit (with Star) of the Republic of Poland ====
- Mr. Jesse Flis

==== Officer's Cross of the Order of Merit of the Republic of Poland ====
- Mr. Edward Henryk Sliz

==== Knight's Cross of the Order of Merit of the Republic of Poland ====
- Mr. Borys Wrzesnewskyj
- Ms. Halina Drozdzal

==== Officer's Cross of the Order of Polonia Restituta ====
- Mr. Ireneusz Sieranski

==== Knight's Cross of the Order of Polonia Restituta ====
- Mr. Henryk Bystrzycki
- Mr. Józef Bełz

==== Gold Cross of Merit of the Republic of Poland ====
- Ms. Jane Skoryna
- Mr. Jozef Palimaka

==== Silver Cross of Merit of the Republic of Poland ====
- Ms. Natalia Kusendova
- Mr. Marcin Gradka
- Mr. Boleslaw Dranski
- Mr. Wladyslaw Lakomy
- Mr. Bogdan Slominski
- Mr. Marek Wichlacz
- Mr. Boleslaw Wojdylo
- Mr. Jan Zubrzycki

==== Cross of Freedom and Solidarity of the Republic of Poland ====
- Mr. Waldermar Jarocki

==== Long Marital Life Medal ====
- Mr. Aleksander Dębski
- Mrs. Stanislawa Dębska

=== From the President of the Republic of Portugal ===
==== Commander of the Order of Infante D. Henrique ====
- Ms. Nelly Furtado

==== Commander of the Order of Merit of the Republic of Portugal ====
- Mr. Manuel da Costa
- Mr. Emanuel Linhares
- Mrs. Ana Paula Lopes
- Mr. Duarte M. Miranda

==== Honorary Member of the Order of Merit of the Republic of Portugal ====
- Mrs. Kátia Caramujo
- Mr. Jack Prazeres

=== From the Government of the Federation of Russia ===
==== Order of Friendship of the Russian Federation ====
- The Right Honourable Jean Chrétien, PC OM CC QC

=== From the President of Serbia ===
==== Gold Medal of Merit ====
- Mr. Michael Chossudovsky

=== From His Majesty The King of Spain ===
==== Silver Cross of the Order of Civil Merit ====
- Mr. Barry Brown

=== From the President of the United States of America ===
==== Legion of Merit (Degree of Officer) ====
- Brigadier-General Alexander Donald Meinzinger
- Major-General Brett Douglas Cairns
- Brigadier-General Gordon David Corbould
- Brigadier-General Christopher J. Coates
- Colonel Scott Anthony Howden
- Commodore William Truelove

==== Legion of Merit (Degree of Legionnaire) ====
- Captain(N) Haydn C. Edmundson

==== Bronze Star Medal ====
- Major Robert P. Ryan
- Colonel Stéphane P. Boucher
- Colonel Peter K. Scott
- Lieutenant-Colonel Pierre C. St-Laurent
- Colonel Ian Lightbody
- Colonel Ivars A. Miezitis
- Colonel Bryan H. Gagné
- Acting Colonel John M. C. Valtonen

==== Defense Meritorious Service Medal ====
- Major J. L. Guy Langevin

==== Meritorious Service Medal, First Oak Leaf Cluste ====
- Colonel Patrick J. B. Carpentier

==== Meritorious Service Medal ====
- Major Denis G. Gagnon
- Lieutenant-Colonel Lynn S. Stoddart
- Major Michael Urban McCarthy
- Major Marc G. Diamond
- Captain(N) Pierre C. Dickinson
- Major Michel Poirier
- Major Mark Bradley Fathers
- Major Ricardo Dias
- Major Richard A. Jolette
- Major Vahe Ohanessian
- Lieutenant-Colonel James R. Ostler
- Colonel Jean François Riffou
- Major Jeffrey James Schamehorn
- Major Christopher John Young
- Lieutenant-Colonel Robert G. Boucher
- Major Michael E. Wells
- Captain William R. Cooper
- Captain Jeffrey Tebo
- Major Linda R. Ballenthin
- Lieutenant-Colonel Douglas Clark
- Major Bryce M. Graham
- Major David N. Jane
- Lieutenant-Colonel J. E. Ghislain Rancourt
- Lieutenant-Colonel Derek R. Spencer
- Colonel Blaise Francis Frawley

==== Air Medal ====
- Warrant Officer Lisa F. Powers
- Captain Gareth D. Carter

== Erratums of Commonwealth and Foreign Orders, Decorations and Medal awarded to Canadians ==
=== Corrections of 25 January 2014 ===
- The notice published on page 2212 of the September 28, 2013, issue of the Canada Gazette, Part I, is hereby amended as follows:From the President of the French Republic, the National Defence Medal, Bronze Echelon with "Génie and Missions d'opérations extérieures" clasps to Major Michaël R. G. Godard;
- The notice published on page 2422 of the October 26, 2013, issue of the Canada Gazette, Part I, is hereby amended as follows: From the President of the French Republic a Knight of the National Order of the Legion of Honour to Sister Dorothée Dubé;
- The notice published on page 3004 of the December 28, 2013, issue of the Canada Gazette, Part I, is hereby amended as follows: From the President of the French Republic, the National Defence Medal, Bronze Echelon to Captain Marc-André La Haye

=== Corrections of 27 September 2014 ===
- The notice published on page 2284 of the August 30, 2014, issue of the Canada Gazette, Part I, is hereby amended as follows: From the Government of the French Republic, an Officer of the Order of Arts and Letters to Ms. Chantal Pontbriand

=== Corrections of 25 October 2014 ===
- The notice published on page 2284 of the August 30, 2014, issue of the Canada Gazette, Part I, is hereby amended as follows: From the President of the French Republic of France, the President of the Republic of France has not appointed Mr. Christian Dumais-Lvowski to the National Order of the Legion of Honour (Knight).

=== Correction of 6 December 2014 ===
- The notice published on page 2440 of the September 27, 2014, issue of the Canada Gazette, Part I, is hereby amended as follows: From the President of the United States of America, the Bronze Star Medal to Lieutenant-Colonel Pierre C. St-Laurent
