= Kilger =

Kilger is a surname. Notable people with the surname include:

- Bob Kilger (1944–2021), Canadian politician
- Chad Kilger (born 1976), Canadian ice hockey player
