= Guy Lauzon =

Canadian politician (1944–2025)

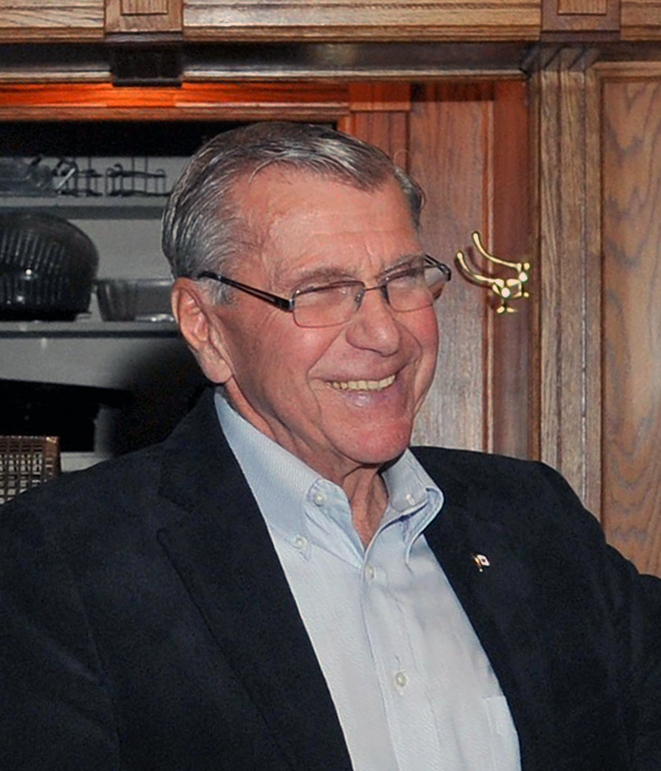
- Lauzon in 2017

Member of Parliament for Stormont—Dundas—South Glengarry
- In office June 28, 2004 – September 11, 2019
- Preceded by: Bob Kilger
- Succeeded by: Eric Duncan

Chair of the Conservative Party of Canada Parliamentary Caucus
- In office November 3, 2008 – November 4, 2015
- Preceded by: Rahim Jaffer
- Succeeded by: David Sweet

Chair of the Standing Committee on Official Languages
- In office May 9, 2006 – May 30, 2007
- Minister: Josée Verner
- Preceded by: Pablo Rodriguez
- Succeeded by: Steven Blaney

Personal details
- Born: April 6, 1944 St. Andrew's West, Ontario, Canada
- Died: June 22, 2025 (aged 81) Cornwall, Ontario, Canada
- Party: Conservative
- Spouse: Frances Lauzon
- Profession: Insurance, agribusiness

Guy Lauzon (French: [gi lozɔ̃]; April 6, 1944 – June 22, 2025) was a Canadian politician who served as the member of Parliament for the riding of Stormont—Dundas—South Glengarry from 2004 to 2019 as a member of the Conservative Party.

== Background ==
Lauzon was born in St. Andrew's West, Ontario and his family roots in the region can be traced to the 19th century.

Lauzon spent over twenty-two years in the federal public service and served as a local union president of the Public Service Alliance of Canada. During the 1990s, he served as chair of the HDRC's United Way and multiple sclerosis research funding campaigns. He retired in 1993, and was until his death, the general manager of Tri-County Protein, a soybean processing plant in Winchester, Ontario.

== Federal politics ==
In the 2000 federal election, Lauzon ran as the Canadian Alliance candidate in Stormont—Dundas—Charlottenburgh, and finished second behind incumbent Liberal Bob Kilger.

=== 38th Parliament ===
The Canadian Alliance and Progressive Conservative Party were merged in 2003, and Lauzon ran as a Conservative in the 2004 election and garnered almost 4,000 votes more than his nearest rival, incumbent Bob Kilger.

Lauzon was appointed the Conservative Party critic for the Treasury Board and Official Languages Committee.

=== 39th Parliament ===
In the 2006 federal election, Lauzon was chosen once more to represent the Conservative Party as the candidate for Stormont—Dundas—South Glengarry. He won 54.7% of the popular vote, defeating his nearest challenger, Tom Manley, by over 14,000 votes.

In 2006, Lauzon was appointed to the deputy whip position of the Conservative party.

In the spring of 2007, Lauzon was ousted from his position as the Official Languages Committee chair in a non-confidence vote (by all three opposition parties) for cancelling a scheduled meeting moments before witnesses were to testify. The hearing was being held to examine the cancellation of a Court Challenges Program, to which the government cut funding. The Conservative government then, following procedures from what the media dubbed the "obstruction manual," decided not to nominate a new chair, shutting down the committee's work.

On October 10, 2007, Lauzon was appointed parliamentary secretary to the minister of agriculture and agri-food and for the Federal Economic Development Initiative for Northern Ontario.

=== 40th Parliament ===
On November 3, 2008, almost a month following that year's federal election, Lauzon was appointed chairman of the Conservative Caucus, succeeding defeated Alberta MP Rahim Jaffer.

=== 41st Parliament ===
Lauzon introduced a bill, C-350, which would ensure any monetary awards owed to an offender as a result of legal action are first used to resolve financial obligations to victims and family members, such as child support dues.

=== 42nd Parliament ===
Lauzon announced on January 26, 2019 that he would not be running in the 2019 election.

== Death ==
Lauzon died at a hospice facility in Cornwall, Ontario on June 22, 2025, at the age of 81. He was predeceased by his wife Frances, who died in August 2021.

== Electoral record ==
2015 Canadian federal election
Party	Candidate	Votes	%	±%	Expenditures
Conservative	Guy Lauzon	27,091	51.1	-11.00	–
Liberal	Bernadette Clement	20,452	38.5	+20.60	–
New Democratic	Patrick Burger	4,332	8.2	-9.3	–
Green	Elaine Kennedy	1,191	2.2	0	–
Total valid votes/expense limit		53,066	100.0		$212,533.29
Total rejected ballots		234	0.43	+0.03	
Turnout		53,300	67.72	+5.02	
Eligible voters		78,706			
Conservative hold		Swing		-15.80	
Source: Elections Canada

2011 Canadian federal election
Party	Candidate	Votes	%	±%	Expenditures
Conservative	Guy Lauzon	29,538	62.1	+4.8	–
Liberal	Bernadette Clement	8,510	17.9	-1.1	–
New Democratic	Mario Leclerc	8,313	17.5	+4.0	–
Green	David Rawnsley	1,038	2.2	-2.0	–
Libertarian	Darcy Neal Donnelly	151	0.3	–	–
Total valid votes/expense limit		47,550	100.0		–
Total rejected ballots		205	0.4	0.0	
Turnout		47,755	62.7	–	
Eligible voters		76,140	–	–	
Conservative hold		Swing		+2.95	

2008 Canadian federal election: Stormont—Dundas—South Glengarry
Party	Candidate	Votes	%	±%	Expenditures
Conservative	Guy Lauzon	25,846	57.3	+2.7	$82,091
Liberal	Denis Sabourin	8,554	19.0	-8.2	$57,264
New Democratic	Darlene Jalbert	6,107	13.5	0.0	$20,455
Independent	Howard Galganov	2,581	5.7	–	$45,371
Green	David Rawnsley	1,880	4.2	+0.8	$7,999
Canadian Action	Dwight Dugas	105	0.2	–	–
Total valid votes/expense limit		45,073		$82,919	
Total rejected ballots		183			
Turnout		45,256	60.1	-4.4	
Eligible voters		75,244			
Conservative hold		Swing		+5.45	
Source: Elections Canada and Canada Elections Database

2006 Canadian federal election
Party	Candidate	Votes	%	±%	Expenditures
Conservative	Guy Lauzon	28,014	54.7	+9.9	$75,147
Liberal	Tom Manley	13,906	27.2	-9.6	$74,262
New Democratic	Elaine MacDonald	6,892	13.5	+2.3	$11,977
Green	Doug Beards	1,713	3.4	-3.9	$4,415
Christian Heritage	Carson Chisholm	663	1.3	n/a	$12,633
Total valid votes		51,188	100.0		
Conservative hold		Swing		+9.75	

2004 Canadian federal election
Party	Candidate	Votes	%	±%
Conservative	Guy Lauzon	21,678	44.8	-3.1
Liberal	Bob Kilger	17,779	36.8	-10.41
New Democratic	Elaine MacDonald	5,387	11.1	+7.04
Green	Tom Manley	3,491	7.2	–
Total valid votes		48,335	100.0	
Total rejected ballots		277	0.60	–
Turnout		48,612	64.5	–
Eligible voters		75,230		
Conservative gain from Liberal		Swing		+7.3

2000 Canadian federal election: Stormont—Dundas—Charlottenburgh
Party	Candidate	Votes	%	±%
Liberal	Bob Kilger	19,113	46.7	-5.8
Alliance	Guy Lauzon	16,151	39.5	+18.9
Progressive Conservative	Michael Bailey	3,635	8.9	-11.2
New Democratic	Kimberley Fry	1,696	4.1	-2.0
Natural Law	Ian Campbell	214	0.5	-0.2
Canadian Action	Georges Elie Novy	127	0.3	
Total valid votes/expense limit		40,936		
Total rejected ballots		256		
Turnout		41,192	61.0	-3.90
Eligible voters		67,476		
Liberal hold		Swing		-12.35
Source: Elections Canada and Canada Elections Database

Political offices
Preceded by Rahim Jaffer	Chair, Government Caucus in the Parliament of Canada; 2008–2015	Succeeded by TBD
Preceded by Rahim Jaffer	Chair, Conservative Caucus in the Parliament of Canada; 2008–2015	Succeeded by David Sweet
