= 2010 Stormont, Dundas and Glengarry United Counties municipal elections =

Elections were held in Stormont, Dundas and Glengarry United Counties, Ontario on October 25, 2010 in conjunction with municipal elections across the province.

== Stormont, Dundas and Glengarry United Counties Council ==
Council consists of the mayors and deputy mayors of each of the townships. It does not include the city of Cornwall.

Position	Elected
North Dundas Mayor	Eric Duncan
North Dundas Deputy Mayor	Gerry Boyce
North Glengarry Mayor	Grant Crack
North Glengarry Deputy Mayor	Chris McDonell
North Stormont Mayor	Dennis Fife
North Stormont Deputy Mayor	Bill McGimpsey
South Dundas Mayor	Steven Byvelds
South Dundas Deputy Mayor	Jim Locke
South Glengarry Mayor	Jim McDonell
South Glengarry Deputy Mayor	Ian McLeod
South Stormont Mayor	Bryan McGillis
South Stormont Deputy Mayor	Tammy Hart

== Cornwall ==
=== Mayor ===
Mayoral Candidate	Vote	%
Bob Kilger (X)	7,471	57
Mark MacDonald	5,168	39
Nicole Spahich	550	0,04

=== Councillors ===
Rang	Councillors Candidate	Vote	%
1.	Bernadette Clement	7043	8
2.	Elaine Macdonald	5955	7
3.	Denis Thibault	5837	7
4.	Denis Carr	5541	7
5.	Glen Grant	5483	7
6.	Maurice Dupelle	5463	6
7.	Syd Gardiner	5341	6
8.	André Rivette	5105	6
9.	David Murphy	4929	6
10.	Leslie O'Shaughnessy	4201	5

== North Dundas ==
Mayoral Candidate	Vote	%
Eric Duncan	3,517	72.59
Alvin Runnalls (X)	1,328	27.41

== North Glengarry ==
Mayoral Candidate	Vote	%
Grant Crack (X)	2,162	
Robert Proulx	660	

== North Stormont ==
Mayoral Candidate	Vote	%
Dennis Fife (X)	Acclaimed	

== South Dundas ==
Mayoral Candidate	Vote	%
Steven Byvelds	1,531	
Lyle Van Allen	1,098	
Dirk Testerink	798	
Del Jones	731	
Ed Merkley	267	

== South Glengarry ==
Mayoral Candidate	Vote	%
Jim McDonell (X)	2649	56
Kevin Demers	634	13
John Warden	1461	31

Deputy Mayoral Candidate	Vote	%
Ian McLeod	2359	51
Frank Prevost	2245	49

== South Stormont ==
Mayoral Candidate	Vote	%
Bryan McGillis (X)	Acclaimed	
