= Ed Lumley =

Canadian politician (1939–2025)

The Honourable Ed Lumley PC CM

Member of the Canadian Parliament for Stormont—Dundas
- In office 1974–1984
- Preceded by: Lucien Lamoureux
- Succeeded by: Norman Warner

Chancellor of the University of Windsor
- In office 2006–2019
- Succeeded by: Mary Jo Haddad

Personal details
- Born: October 27, 1939 Windsor, Ontario, Canada
- Died: April 16, 2025 (aged 85)
- Party: Liberal
- Cabinet: Minister of Communications (1984); Minister of Regional Industrial Expansion (1983–1984); Minister of Industry, Trade and Commerce (1982–1983); Minister of Regional Economic Expansion (1982–1983); Minister of State for Science and Technology (1984); Minister of State (International Trade) (1982); Minister of State (Trade) (1980–1982)
- Portfolio: Parliamentary Secretary to the Minister of Finance (1977–1978); Parliamentary Secretary to the Minister of Regional Economic Expansion (1976–1977)

Edward C. Lumley PC CM (October 27, 1939 – April 16, 2025) was a Canadian corporate executive and politician.

== Life and career ==
Born in Windsor, Ontario, he received a Bachelor of Commerce degree in 1961 from Assumption University (predecessor of the University of Windsor). Lumley established himself in business in Cornwall in the other end of the province before entering politics. He served as Mayor of Cornwall between 1972 and 1974, and was first elected to the House of Commons of Canada as the Liberal Member of Parliament for Stormont—Dundas in the 1974 federal election.

In 1976, Lumley became parliamentary secretary to the Minister of Regional Economic Expansion. From 1977 to 1978, he served as parliamentary secretary to the Minister of Finance.

Lumley survived the 1979 election that defeated the Liberal government. The Liberals returned to power in the 1980 federal election and Prime Minister Pierre Trudeau appointed Lumley to the cabinet as Minister of State for Trade. After serving in a few other minor portfolios, he was promoted to Minister of Industry and Minister of Regional Economic Expansion in 1982.

Trudeau's successor, John Turner, made Lumley his Minister of Communications and Minister of Regional Industrial Expansion in 1984. Lumley was defeated in the 1984 federal election that fall.

Following his electoral defeat, Lumley returned to the private sector and became an influential corporate figure. He served as vice-chairman of BMO Nesbitt Burns from 1991 onwards, lead director of Magna International, and a board member of Bell Canada Enterprises, Canadian National Railway and Air Canada.

In 2000, he was appointed to lead a commission examining salaries and compensation for Members of Parliament.

A friend of the then-prime minister, Paul Martin, he was consulted by Martin's government on various issues.

In 2006, he was appointed Chancellor of the University of Windsor.

On July 1, 2014, he was appointed a Member of the Order of Canada (CM) "for having served his community and country, notably as the federal minister of Industry." He also received the Queen Elizabeth II Golden Jubilee Medal and Queen Elizabeth II Diamond Jubilee Medal in 2002 and 2012 respectively.

On April 16, 2025, Lumley died at the age of 85.

== Sources ==
- Ed Lumley – Parliament of Canada biography
