= Norman Warner =

Canadian politician

Norman Warner MP

Member of the Canadian Parliament for Stormont—Dundas
- In office 1984–1988
- Preceded by: Ed Lumley
- Succeeded by: Bob Kilger

Personal details
- Born: Norman Melvin Warner; 23 December 1943 Ottawa, Ontario
- Died: 1 April 2014 (aged 70) Cornwall, Ontario
- Party: Progressive Conservative
- Spouse: Elizabeth Warner
- Children: Michael Warner
- Occupation: Businessman

Norman Melvin Warner (23 December 1943 – 1 April 2014) was a Canadian businessman and politician. Warner was a Progressive Conservative party member of the House of Commons of Canada. He was an insurance broker by career.

Born in Ottawa, Ontario, he was elected in the Stormont—Dundas electoral district during the 1984 federal election, after defeating the incumbent Minister of State for Science and Technology, Ed Lumley. He then served his federal term in the 33rd Canadian Parliament. He left federal politics after completing this term and did not contest the next 1988 federal election.

During his only term in the House of Commons, Warner unsuccessfully attempted to have the House of Commons declare the Akwesasne First Nations reserve near Cornwall, Ontario as an international banking centre. This was proposed when the federal government planned to confer such status on Montreal and Vancouver.

In 1989, Ontario Provincial Police charged Warner and an accountant with fraud, perjury and theft regarding a case of $113,575 in Ontario provincial grants for a small business development. Warner was found not guilty on all charges by an Ontario court in June 1991.

Warner announced his retirement from Parliament, explaining that he wanted to spend more time with wife, Elizabeth, and his son, Michael, and that the strain of political life was a relevant part of his decision. He died of cancer on 2 April 2014, aged 70.
