= 2014 Stormont, Dundas and Glengarry United Counties municipal elections =

Elections were held in Stormont, Dundas and Glengarry United Counties, Ontario on October 27, 2014 in conjunction with municipal elections across the province.

== Stormont, Dundas and Glengarry United Counties Council ==
Council consists of the mayors and deputy mayors of each of the townships. It does not include the city of Cornwall.

Position	Elected
North Dundas Mayor	Eric Duncan (acclaimed)
North Dundas Deputy Mayor	Gerry Boyce
North Glengarry Mayor	Chris McDonell (acclaimed)
North Glengarry Deputy Mayor	Jamie MacDonald (acclaimed)
North Stormont Mayor	Dennis Fife (acclaimed)
North Stormont Deputy Mayor	Bill McGimpsey
South Dundas Mayor	Evonne Delegarde
South Dundas Deputy Mayor	Jim Locke
South Glengarry Mayor	Ian McLeod
South Glengarry Deputy Mayor	Frank Prevost
South Stormont Mayor	Jim Bancroft
South Stormont Deputy Mayor	Tammy A. Hart

== North Dundas ==
Mayoral Candidate	Vote	%
Eric Duncan (X)	Acclaimed	

== North Glengarry ==
Mayoral Candidate	Vote	%
Chris McDonell (X)	Acclaimed	

== North Stormont ==
Mayoral Candidate	Vote	%
Dennis Fife (X)	Acclaimed	

== South Dundas ==
Mayoral Candidate	Vote	%
Evonne Delegarde	2,807	66.91
Steven Byvelds (X)	1,388	33.09

== South Glengarry ==
Mayoral Candidate	Vote	%
Ian McLeod (X)	2,767	63.25
Dave MacDonald	1,608	36.75

== South Stormont ==
Mayoral Candidate	Vote	%
Jim Bancroft	2,813	55.90
Bryan McGillis (X)	2,219	44.10
