= Stormont—Dundas—Glengarry =

Federal electoral district in Ontario, Canada

Coordinates: 45.17°N 74.95°W

Ontario electoral district
- Interactive map of riding boundaries from the 2025 federal election

Federal electoral district
- Legislature: House of Commons
MP
Eric Duncan
Conservative
- District created: 1966
- First contested: 1968
- Last contested: 2025
- District webpage: profile, map

Demographics
- Population (2011): 100,913
- Electors (2015): 78,167
- Area (km²): 2,665.15
- Pop. density (per km²): 37.9
- Census division: Stormont, Dundas and Glengarry
- Census subdivision(s): Cornwall, South Stormont, South Glengarry, North Dundas, South Dundas, North Glengarry, North Stormont, Akwesasne

Stormont—Dundas—Glengarry (formerly Stormont—Dundas, Stormont—Dundas—Charlottenburgh and Stormont—Dundas—South Glengarry) is a federal electoral district in Ontario, Canada, that has been represented in the House of Commons of Canada since 1968.

== Geography ==
The district includes the United Counties of Stormont, Dundas and Glengarry, including the City of Cornwall and the Mohawks of Akwesasne on Cornwall Island, which are administratively independent of but geographically located within the United Counties.

== History ==
The riding was known as Stormont—Dundas from 1966 to 1999. The riding was created from parts of Stormont and Grenville—Dundas ridings.

It initially consisted of the County of Stormont including the City of Cornwall, and the townships of Williamsburg and Winchester (in the County of Dundas). In 1976, it was redefined to consist of all of the counties of Dundas and Stormont, and the Township of Charlottenburgh in Glengarry County, but excluding the Village of Lancaster. In 1987, it was redefined to consist of the counties of Dundas and Stormont, excluding Akwesasne Indian Reserve No. 59. In 1996, it was redefined to include the Township of Charlottenburgh and Akwesasne Indian Reserve No. 59.

The electoral district's name was changed in 1999 to Stormont—Dundas—Charlottenburgh. It was represented in the House of Commons of Canada from 1997 to 2004, At the time, it consisted of parts of the United Counties of Stormont, Dundas and Glengarry: the Township of Charlottenburgh (Glengarry County), the counties of Dundas and Stormont, and Akwesasne Indian Reserve No. 59.

In the 2003 representation, the riding was re-named Stormont—Dundas—South Glengarry, and consisted of 91.5% of its original territory, and 4.9% of Glengarry—Prescott—Russell riding.

This riding was unchanged during the 2012 electoral redistribution.

Following the 2022 Canadian federal electoral redistribution, this riding was renamed Stormont—Dundas—Glengarry prior to the 2025 Canadian federal election. It gained North Glengarry from Glengarry—Prescott—Russell in the process.

== Demographics ==
According to the 2021 Canadian census

Ethnic groups: 86.9% White, 7.3% Indigenous, 2.5% South Asian, 1.1% Black

Languages: 77.5% English, 20.0% French

Religions: 68.3% Christian (44.4% Catholic, 6.6% United Church, 3.8% Anglican, 2.8% Presbyterian, 10.7% Other), 1.9% Muslim, 28.0% none

Median income: $39,200 (2020)

Average income: $47,160 (2020)

== Member of Parliament ==
This riding has elected the following members of Parliament:

| Parliament | Years | Member | Party |
|---|---|---|---|
Stormont—Dundas; Riding created from Grenville—Dundas and Stormont
| 28th | 1968–1972 | Lucien Lamoureux | Independent |
| 29th | 1972–1974 | Lucien Lamoureux | Independent |
| 30th | 1974–1979 | Ed Lumley | Liberal |
| 31st | 1979–1980 | Ed Lumley | Liberal |
| 32nd | 1980–1984 | Ed Lumley | Liberal |
| 33rd | 1984–1988 | Norman Warner | Progressive Conservative |
| 34th | 1988–1993 | Bob Kilger | Liberal |
| 35th | 1993–1997 | Bob Kilger | Liberal |
| 36th | 1997–2000 | Bob Kilger | Liberal |
Stormont—Dundas—Charlottenburgh
| 37th | 2000–2004 | Bob Kilger | Liberal |
Stormont—Dundas—South Glengarry
| 38th | 2004–2006 | Guy Lauzon | Conservative |
| 39th | 2006–2008 | Guy Lauzon | Conservative |
| 40th | 2008–2011 | Guy Lauzon | Conservative |
| 41st | 2011–2015 | Guy Lauzon | Conservative |
| 42nd | 2015–2019 | Guy Lauzon | Conservative |
| 43rd | 2019–2021 | Eric Duncan | Conservative |
| 44th | 2021–2025 | Eric Duncan | Conservative |
Stormont—Dundas—Glengarry
| 45th | 2025–present | Eric Duncan | Conservative |

== Election results ==
Graph of election results in Stormont—Dundas—South Glengarry (minor parties that never got 2% of the vote or didn't run consistently are omitted) View source data.

=== Stormont—Dundas—Glengarry, 2023 representation order ===
2025 Canadian federal election
** Preliminary results — Not yet official **
| Party | Candidate | Votes | % | ±% | Expenditures |
|---|---|---|---|---|---|
| Conservative | Eric Duncan | 37,441 | 56.43 | +2.11 | |
| Liberal | Sarah Good | 26,318 | 39.66 | +14.95 | |
| New Democratic | Mario Leclerc | 1,653 | 2.49 | –8.41 | |
| Green | Gordon Kubanek | 672 | 1.01 | –1.31 | |
| Libertarian | Karl Ivan MacKinnon | 270 | 0.41 | N/A | |
| Total valid votes/expense limit | | | | | |
| Total rejected ballots | | | | | |
| Turnout | | 66,354 | 68.47 | | |
| Eligible voters | | 96,911 | | | |
| Conservative notional hold | | Swing | | –6.42 | |
Source: Elections Canada

2021 federal election redistributed results
| Party | Vote | % |
|---|---|---|
| Conservative | 31,701 | 54.32 |
| Liberal | 14,419 | 24.71 |
| New Democratic | 6,361 | 10.90 |
| People's | 4,475 | 7.67 |
| Green | 1,351 | 2.32 |
| Free | 25 | 0.04 |
| Independent | 24 | 0.04 |
| Total valid votes | 58,356 | 98.95 |
| Rejected ballots | 622 | 1.05 |
| Registered voters/ estimated turnout | 94,438 | 62.45 |

=== Stormont—Dundas—South Glengarry, 2004–2021 ===
2021 Canadian federal election: Stormont—Dundas—South Glengarry
| Party | Candidate | Votes | % | ±% | Expenditures |
|---|---|---|---|---|---|
| Conservative | Eric Duncan | 29,255 | 55.6 | +1.7 | $108,989.17 |
| Liberal | Denis Moquin | 12,443 | 23.6 | -2.0 | $28,418.33 |
| New Democratic | Trevor Kennedy | 5,804 | 11.0 | -3.3 | $0.00 |
| People's | David Anber | 3,921 | 7.4 | +5.2 | $16,317.85 |
| Green | Jeanie Warnock | 1,230 | 2.3 | -1.7 | $4,574.07 |
| Total valid votes/expense limit | | 52,653 | | | $114,863.35 |
| Total rejected ballots | | 547 | | | |
| Turnout | | 53,200 | 62.0 | -1.83 | |
| Eligible voters | | 85,816 | | | |
Source: Elections Canada

2019 Canadian federal election: Stormont—Dundas—South Glengarry
| Party | Candidate | Votes | % | ±% | Expenditures |
|---|---|---|---|---|---|
| Conservative | Eric Duncan | 28,976 | 53.9 | +2.80 | $83,216.74 |
| Liberal | Heather Megill | 13,767 | 25.6 | -12.90 | $36,007.63 |
| New Democratic | Kelsey Catherine Schmitz | 7,674 | 14.3 | +6.10 | $8,589.61 |
| Green | Raheem Aman | 2,126 | 4.0 | +1.80 | none listed |
| People's | Sabile Trimm | 1,168 | 2.2 | | $3,204.92 |
| Total valid votes | | 53,711 | | | |
| Total rejected ballots | | 533 | | | |
| Turnout | | 54,244 | 63.83 | -3.4 | |
| Eligible voters | | 84,983 | | | |
| Conservative hold | | Swing | | +7.85 | |
Source: Elections Canada and Canada Elections Database

2015 Canadian federal election
| Party | Candidate | Votes | % | ±% | Expenditures |
|---|---|---|---|---|---|
| Conservative | Guy Lauzon | 27,091 | 51.1 | -11.00 | $153,347.15 |
| Liberal | Bernadette Clement | 20,452 | 38.5 | +20.60 | $92,517.79 |
| New Democratic | Patrick Burger | 4,332 | 8.2 | -9.3 | $19,407.39 |
| Green | Elaine Kennedy | 1,191 | 2.2 | 0 | – |
| Total valid votes/expense limit | | 53,066 | | | $212,960.34 |
| Total rejected ballots | | 234 | | | |
| Turnout | | 53,300 | 67.23 | +5.13 | |
| Eligible voters | | 79,275 | | | |
| Conservative hold | | Swing | | -15.8 | |
Source: Elections Canada and Canada Elections Database

2011 Canadian federal election
| Party | Candidate | Votes | % | ±% | Expenditures |
|---|---|---|---|---|---|
| Conservative | Guy Lauzon | 29,538 | 62.1 | +4.8 | – |
| Liberal | Bernadette Clement | 8,510 | 17.9 | -1.1 | – |
| New Democratic | Mario Leclerc | 8,313 | 17.5 | +4.0 | – |
| Green | Wyatt Walsh | 1,038 | 2.2 | -2.0 | – |
| Libertarian | Darcy Neal Donnelly | 151 | 0.3 | – | – |
| Total valid votes/expense limit | | 47,550 | | | |
| Total rejected ballots | | 205 | | | |
| Turnout | | 47,755 | 62.1 | +2.0 | |
| Eligible voters | | 76,915 | | | |
| Conservative hold | | Swing | | +2.95 | |
Source: Elections Canada and Canada Elections Database

2008 Canadian federal election: Stormont—Dundas—South Glengarry
| Party | Candidate | Votes | % | ±% | Expenditures |
|---|---|---|---|---|---|
| Conservative | Guy Lauzon | 25,846 | 57.3 | +2.7 | $82,091 |
| Liberal | Denis Sabourin | 8,554 | 19.0 | -8.2 | $57,264 |
| New Democratic | Darlene Jalbert | 6,107 | 13.5 | 0.0 | $20,455 |
| Independent | Howard Galganov | 2,581 | 5.7 | – | $45,371 |
| Green | David Rawnsley | 1,880 | 4.2 | +0.8 | $7,999 |
| Canadian Action | Dwight Dugas | 105 | 0.2 | – | – |
| Total valid votes/expense limit | | 45,073 | | $82,919 | |
| Total rejected ballots | | 183 | | | |
| Turnout | | 45,256 | 60.1 | -4.4 | |
| Eligible voters | | 75,244 | | | |
| Conservative hold | | Swing | | +5.45 | |
Source: Elections Canada and Canada Elections Database

2006 Canadian federal election
| Party | Candidate | Votes | % | ±% | Expenditures |
|---|---|---|---|---|---|
| Conservative | Guy Lauzon | 28,014 | 54.7 | +9.9 | $75,147 |
| Liberal | Tom Manley | 13,906 | 27.2 | -9.6 | $74,262 |
| New Democratic | Elaine MacDonald | 6,892 | 13.5 | +2.3 | $11,977 |
| Green | Doug Beards | 1,713 | 3.4 | -3.9 | $4,415 |
| Christian Heritage | Carson Chisholm | 663 | 1.3 | n/a | $12,633 |
| Total valid votes | | 51,188 | | | |
| Total rejected ballots | | 214 | | | |
| Turnout | | 51,402 | 67.86 | +3.36 | |
| Eligible voters | | 75,745 | | | |
| Conservative hold | | Swing | | +9.75 | |
Source: Elections Canada and Canada Elections Database

2004 Canadian federal election
| Party | Candidate | Votes | % | ±% |
|---|---|---|---|---|
| Conservative | Guy Lauzon | 21,678 | 44.8 | -3.1 |
| Liberal | Bob Kilger | 17,779 | 36.8 | -10.41 |
| New Democratic | Elaine MacDonald | 5,387 | 11.1 | +7.04 |
| Green | Tom Manley | 3,491 | 7.2 | – |
| Total valid votes | | 48,335 | | |
| Total rejected ballots | | 277 | | |
| Turnout | | 48,612 | 64.5 | +3.5 |
| Eligible voters | | 75,320 | | |
| Conservative gain from Liberal | | Swing | | +7.3 |
Source: Elections Canada and Canada Elections Database

=== Stormont—Dundas—Charlottenburgh, 2000–2004 ===
2000 Canadian federal election: Stormont—Dundas—Charlottenburgh
| Party | Candidate | Votes | % | ±% |
|---|---|---|---|---|
| Liberal | Bob Kilger | 19,113 | 46.7 | -5.8 |
| Alliance | Guy Lauzon | 16,151 | 39.5 | +18.9 |
| Progressive Conservative | Michael Bailey | 3,635 | 8.9 | -11.2 |
| New Democratic | Kimberley Fry | 1,696 | 4.1 | -2.0 |
| Natural Law | Ian Campbell | 214 | 0.5 | -0.2 |
| Canadian Action | Georges Elie Novy | 127 | 0.3 | |
| Total valid votes/expense limit | | 40,936 | | |
| Total rejected ballots | | 256 | | |
| Turnout | | 41,192 | 61.0 | -3.90 |
| Eligible voters | | 67,476 | | |
| Liberal hold | | Swing | | -12.35 |
Source: Elections Canada and Canada Elections Database

=== Stormont—Dundas, 1968–2000 ===
1997 Canadian federal election: Stormont—Dundas
| Party | Candidate | Votes | % | ±% |
|---|---|---|---|---|
| Liberal | Bob Kilger | 22,857 | 52.53 | -10.92 |
| Reform | Charles Dillabough | 8,945 | 20.56 | +6.82 |
| Progressive Conservative | Leslie O' Shaughnessy | 8,741 | 20.09 | +2.50 |
| New Democratic | Sydney Gardiner | 2,671 | 6.14 | +3.45 |
| Natural Law | Ian A. G. Campbell | 295 | 0.68 | -0.32 |
| Total valid votes | | 43,509 | | |
| Total rejected ballots | | 267 | | |
| Turnout | | 43,776 | 64.95 | -3.0 |
| Eligible voters | | 67,404 | | |
Source:Elections Canada and Canada Elections Database

1993 Canadian federal election: Stormont—Dundas
| Party | Candidate | Votes | % | ±% |
|---|---|---|---|---|
| Liberal | Bob Kilger | 27,080 | 63.39 | +17.42 |
| Progressive Conservative | Leslie Ault | 7,498 | 17.55 | -11.79 |
| Reform | Annette Turner | 5,901 | 13.81 | |
| New Democratic | David Moss | 1,153 | 2.70 | -10.01 |
| National | Andy Boyle | 579 | 1.36 | |
| Natural Law | Ian Campbell | 424 | 0.90 | |
| Commonwealth of Canada | Reginald Landry | 79 | 0.19 | |
| Total valid votes | | 42,714 | | |
| Total rejected ballots | | 309 | | |
| Turnout | | 43,023 | 67.95 | -5.15 |
| Eligible voters | | 63,315 | | |
Source: Elections Canada and Canada Elections Database

1988 Canadian federal election: Stormont—Dundas
| Party | Candidate | Votes | % | ±% |
|---|---|---|---|---|
| Liberal | Bob Kilger | 19,698 | 45.97 | +4.82 |
| Progressive Conservative | Eric J. Cameron | 12,572 | 29.34 | -16.67 |
| New Democratic | Steve J. Corrie | 5,448 | 12.71 | -0.12 |
| Confederation of Regions | Bob Noble | 5,135 | 11.98 | |
| Total valid votes | | 42,853 | | |
| Turnout (based on valid votes; total votes not available) | | 42,853 | 73.1 | -0.9 |
| Eligible voters | | 58,632 | | |
Source: Elections Canada and Canada Elections Database

1984 Canadian federal election: Stormont—Dundas
| Party | Candidate | Votes | % | ±% |
|---|---|---|---|---|
| Progressive Conservative | Norman Warner | 21,043 | 46.01 | +10.06 |
| Liberal | Ed Lumley | 18,821 | 41.15 | -11.87 |
| New Democratic | Raymond Lefebvre | 5,869 | 12.83 | +1.80 |
| Total valid votes | | 45,733 | | |
| Total rejected ballots | | 284 | | |
| Turnout | | 46,017 | 74 | +5.4 |
| Eligible voters | | 62,193 | | |
Source: Elections Canada and Canada Elections Database

1980 Canadian federal election: Stormont—Dundas
| Party | Candidate | Votes | % | ±% |
|---|---|---|---|---|
| Liberal | Ed Lumley | 22,251 | 53.02 | +5.95 |
| Progressive Conservative | James C. Bredin | 15,089 | 35.95 | -4.25 |
| New Democratic | Maurice Labelle | 4,629 | 11.03 | -1.70 |
| Total valid votes | | 41,969 | | |
| Total rejected ballots | | 171 | | |
| Turnout | | 42,140 | 68.6 | -4.68 |
| Eligible voters | | 61,418 | | |
Source: Elections Canada and Canada Elections Database

1979 Canadian federal election: Stormont—Dundas
| Party | Candidate | Votes | % | ±% |
|---|---|---|---|---|
| Liberal | Ed Lumley | 20,581 | 47.07 | -5.20 |
| Progressive Conservative | Dick Aubury | 17,575 | 40.20 | -0.04 |
| New Democratic | Brian Peters | 5,568 | 12.73 | +5.24 |
| Total valid votes | | 43,724 | | |
| Turnout (based on valid votes; total votes not available) | | 43,724 | 73.28 | -1.55 |
| Eligible voters | | 59,692 | | |
Source: Elections Canada and Canada Elections Database

1974 Canadian federal election: Stormont—Dundas
| Party | Candidate | Votes | % | ±% |
|---|---|---|---|---|
| Liberal | Ed Lumley | 18,047 | 52.27 | |
| Progressive Conservative | Fern Guindon | 13,895 | 40.24 | +2.72 |
| New Democratic | James Freeman | 2,587 | 7.49 | -1.94 |
| Total valid votes | | 34,529 | | |
| Total rejected ballots | | 140 | | |
| Turnout | | 34,569 | 74.83 | +0.85 |
| Eligible voters | | 46,332 | | |
Source: Elections Canada and Canada Elections Database

1972 Canadian federal election: Stormont—Dundas
| Party | Candidate | Votes | % | ±% |
|---|---|---|---|---|
| Independent | Lucien Lamoureux | 17,347 | 52.64 | -23.24 |
| Progressive Conservative | Grant Campbell | 12,364 | 37.52 | |
| New Democratic | Murray Forsyth | 3,108 | 9.43 | -14.69 |
| Independent | René Benoit | 138 | 0.42 | |
| Total valid votes | | 32,957 | | |
| Turnout (based on valid votes; total votes not available) | | 32,957 | 73.98 | +16.0 |
| Eligible voters | | 44,546 | | |
Source: Elections Canada and Canada Elections Database

1968 Canadian federal election: Stormont—Dundas
| Party | Candidate | Votes | % |
|---|---|---|---|
| Independent | Lucien Lamoureux | 17,014 | 75.88 |
| New Democratic | Tim Wees | 5,409 | 24.12 |
| Total valid votes | | 22,423 | |
| Turnout (based on valid votes; total votes not available) | | 22,423 | 57.98 |
| Eligible voters | | 38,672 | |
Source: Elections Canada and Canada Elections Database

== See also ==
- List of Canadian electoral districts
- Historical federal electoral districts of Canada
