= Eric Duncan (politician) =

Canadian politician (born 1987)

Eric Duncan MP
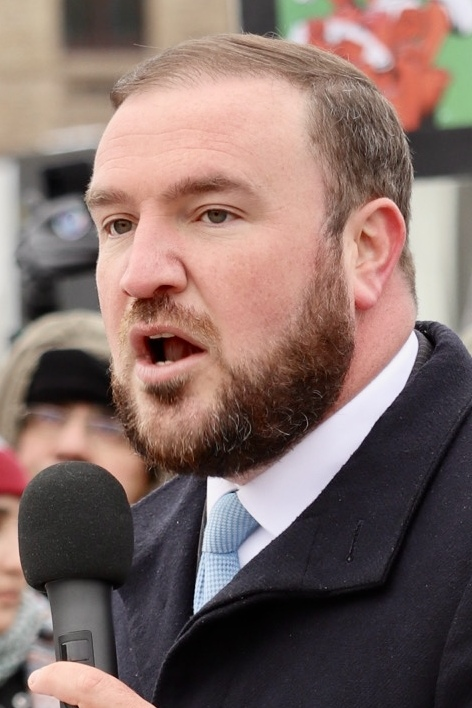
- Duncan in 2022

Shadow Minister for Foreign Affairs
- Incumbent
- Assumed office June 30, 2026
- Leader: Pierre Poilievre
- Shadowing: Anita Anand
- Preceded by: Michael Chong

Conservative Party Caucus Liaison
- In office September 13, 2022 – May 21, 2025
- Leader: Pierre Poilievre
- Preceded by: Tim Uppal
- Succeeded by: Warren Steinley

Conservative Party Question Period Coordinator
- In office September 2, 2020 – September 13, 2022
- Leader: Erin O'Toole; Candice Bergen; Pierre Poilievre
- Preceded by: Position established
- Succeeded by: Chris Warkentin (As Deputy Whip & QP Coordinator)

Member of Parliament for Stormont—Dundas—Glengarry Stormont—Dundas—South Glengarry (2019–2025)
- Incumbent
- Assumed office October 21, 2019
- Preceded by: Guy Lauzon

Personal details
- Born: November 10, 1987 (age 38) Winchester, Ontario, Canada
- Party: Conservative Party of Canada

Eric Dawson Duncan MP (born 10 November 1987) is a Canadian politician who was elected to represent the riding of Stormont—Dundas—South Glengarry in the House of Commons of Canada in the 2019 Canadian federal election. He is a member of the Conservative Party of Canada. Prior to his election to Parliament, Duncan served as mayor of the township of North Dundas from 2010 to 2018. He is the first openly gay Conservative MP to serve in the House of Commons. He was appointed as Shadow Minister for Foreign Affairs in June 2026.

During his term as mayor he came out as gay, and during the 2019 federal election campaign he defended party leader Andrew Scheer over his stance on same-sex marriage by arguing that he would not run as a Conservative if his sexual orientation was not welcomed in the Conservative Party. After the Conservatives increased their seat count but did not displace the governing Liberals as the largest party in the House, Duncan argued that the party should rethink its approach to LGBTQ issues in order to resonate with voters.

In the 44th Parliament, Duncan introduced Private Member's Bill C-396, Stopping the Tax on the Carbon Tax Act, which sought to eliminate the goods and services tax from carbon pollution pricing. The bill did not pass the first reading. Duncan also jointly seconded C-377, An Act to amend the Parliament of Canada Act (need to know) C-358, An Act to amend the Excise Tax Act (carbon pollution pricing) and C-233, An Act to amend the Criminal Code and the Judges Act (violence against an intimate partner).

Duncan attended North Dundas District High School in Chesterville, Ontario.

At the time of the 2025 Canadian federal election, he lived in Cornwall, Ontario.

== Electoral record ==
2025 Canadian federal election: Stormont—Dundas—Glengarry
Party	Candidate	Votes	%	±%
Conservative	Eric Duncan	37,399	56.32	+1.99
Liberal	Sarah Good	26,407	39.77	+15.06
New Democratic	Mario Leclerc	1,653	2.49	–8.41
Green	Gordon Kubanek	674	1.01	–1.30
Libertarian	Karl Ivan MacKinnon	270	0.41	N/A
Total valid votes		66,407	99.38	
Total rejected ballots		417	0.62	-0.43
Turnout		66,824	68.59	+6.13
Eligible voters		97,432		
Conservative notional hold		Swing		–6.53
Source: Elections Canada

2021 Canadian federal election: Stormont—Dundas—South Glengarry
Party	Candidate	Votes	%	±%	Expenditures
Conservative	Eric Duncan	29,255	55.6	+1.7	$108,989.17
Liberal	Denis Moquin	12,443	23.6	-2.0	$28,418.33
New Democratic	Trevor Kennedy	5,804	11.0	-3.3	$0.00
People's	David Anber	3,921	7.4	+5.2	$16,317.85
Green	Jeanie Warnock	1,230	2.3	-1.7	$4,574.07
Total valid votes/expense limit		52,653			$114,863.35
Total rejected ballots		547			
Turnout		53,200	62.0	-1.83	
Eligible voters		85,816			
Source: Elections Canada

2019 Canadian federal election: Stormont—Dundas—South Glengarry
Party	Candidate	Votes	%	±%	Expenditures
Conservative	Eric Duncan	28,976	53.9	+2.80	$83,216.74
Liberal	Heather Megill	13,767	25.6	-12.90	$36,007.63
New Democratic	Kelsey Catherine Schmitz	7,674	14.3	+6.10	$8,589.61
Green	Raheem Aman	2,126	4.0	+1.80	none listed
People's	Sabile Trimm	1,168	2.2		$3,204.92
Total valid votes		53,711			
Total rejected ballots		533			
Turnout		54,244	63.83	-3.4	
Eligible voters		84,983			
Conservative hold		Swing		+7.85	
Source: Elections Canada and Canada Elections Database

2014 North Dundas mayoral election
Mayoral Candidate	Vote	%
Eric Duncan (X)	Acclaimed	

2010 North Dundas mayoral election
Mayoral Candidate	Vote	%
Eric Duncan	3,517	72.59
Alvin Runnalls (X)	1,328	27.41
