= Howard Galganov =

Canadian activist

Howard Galganov (born February 12, 1950, in Montreal, Quebec) is a Canadian political activist who was active as a radio personality in Montreal during the late 1990s. He made headlines in Quebec for being a vocal and confrontational opponent of the Charter of the French Language and Quebec nationalism as one of the most prominent leaders of the "angryphone" movement, before moving to Ontario and criticizing official bilingualism in Canada.

== Early life ==
Howard Galganov was born on February 12, 1950, to a poor Orthodox Jewish family. His father had served during the allied invasion of Sicily and the battle of Monte Cassino, in addition to other countries. Galganov's website says that his father was given an award by Wilhelmina of the Netherlands due to his participation in the Allied liberation of the Netherlands.

Galganov reportedly had an activist history. His grandfather, a Russian Jew, came to Canada to escape communism. In the 1960s, as a member of Montreal's branch of the far-right Jewish Defense League, Galganov threw coffins on the Soviet embassy lawn in Ottawa to protest the treatment of Jewish "refuseniks".

== Quebec activism ==
By the 1990s, Howard Galganov had become an outspoken critic of the Quebec sovereignty movement and of the Canadian government for not defending the rights of English-speaking citizens living in the Canadian province of Quebec, stating that banning the use of English entirely is a violation of the Canadian Charter of Rights and Freedoms. His goals were defending the equality of all languages, laws defending bilingual equality in Canada, defence against the local unlawful banning of all English in print, as well as the freedom of the individual to choose freely for themselves. He worked to bring awareness to those outside of Quebec on perceived human rights abuses being enacted in Quebec against anglophones, as noted by both the United Nations and the Supreme Court of Canada.

After a 1995 Quebec referendum on sovereignty for the province of Quebec, Galganov founded the Quebec Political Action Committee (QPAC), serving as its president (and only member) until 2000. One of Galganov’s first prominent QPAC activities was to organize a protest at Fairview Pointe-Claire, a shopping mall, in 1996 in the predominantly anglophone West Island of Montreal to protest that retail stores were not placing any English on their commercial signs despite being allowed under the Charter of the French Language. Estimated attendance at the protest varied from 500 to 5,000. Galganov followed up this protest with threatened boycotts of prominent retail stores. He also protested the actions of the Office québécois de la langue française on numerous issues including when language inspectors ordered stores to remove kosher products from their shelves just before Passover because they were not labelled in the French language. These activities caused a reaction among fringe Quebec nationalist groups, garnering publicity for Galganov.

Later in 1996, he gave a speech at the Harvard Club of New York City, in spite of requests not to do so from federal and provincial officials concerned that it might discourage foreign investment in Canada; the speech went ahead regardless. In 1997, he opened a store with perfectly equal French and English in all signage, deliberately violating the commercial sign provisions of the Charter of the French Language act in order to provoke reactionary measures and media awareness.

After his QPAC activities, Galganov attempted several more politically related activities. In June 1997, he unsuccessfully ran for parliament in Mount Royal as an independent, coming in second. In 1997, he started hosting an AM radio talk show on Montreal radio station CIQC-AM, first in the morning and then at noon. He was on the air for just over a year (replaced in the morning show by Montreal broadcaster Jim Duff), and made efforts to help rally support for William Johnson in his run for the leadership of Alliance Quebec. He also ran for mayor of the town of Saint-Lazare, Quebec, placing third.

== Ontario activism ==
Shortly after his Saint-Lazare mayoralty campaign, he moved to Eastern Ontario. He ran as an independent candidate in the Ontario riding of Stormont-Dundas-South Glengarry in the federal election of October 14, 2008, advocating an end to official bilingualism and the separation of Quebec from Canada, and finishing fourth with 5.7% of the vote.

Galganov, along with Jean-Serge Brisson, a local business owner, is challenging in provincial court a regulation on mandatory bilingual signage adopted on June 16, 2008, by the township of Russell. He claims that the regulation, by making French-only or English-only signs illegal, is threatening the French language in Ontario. One Galganov associate is Elizabeth Trudeau, an official spokesperson for Canadians for Language Fairness, which battles forced bilingual legislation in Canada, claiming that it elevates "French speakers to first-class status and the rest of us to second and third-class status".
