= Danielle Juteau =

Canadian sociologist

Danielle Juteau CM FRSC
- Born: 13 October 1942 (age 83)
- Education: University of Toronto (PhD)
- Occupations: Sociology professor (ret.), author
- Employer: University of Montreal
- Title: Professor Emeritus

Danielle Juteau (born 13 October 1942) is a Québécoise professor of sociology.

== Biography ==
Professor Emeritus in the Department of Sociology at the University of Montreal, Juteau holds a Bachelor of Arts from Marguerite-Bourgeoys College, a bachelor's degree in sociology from the University of Montreal, and a master's degree and a PhD in sociology from the University of Toronto. Juteau is one of the pioneers of ethnic studies in Canada and around the world.

Juteau taught sociology from 1972 at the University of Ottawa where she received the Teaching Excellence Award. It is at this university that she offered her first course in women's studies. She was one of the first academics to teach courses in feminist studies.

Juteau joined the faculty of the University of Montreal in 1981, when she developed the field of ethnic studies in Quebec. She is the first holder of the chair in Ethnic Relations at the University of Montreal (1991–2003). She also founded the Ethnicity and Society Research Group and the Centre for Ethnic Studies. Juteau revolutionized ethnic studies by going beyond the traditional economy-culture dichotomy, to emphasize the interdependence of the economic, political and symbolic factors that underlie inequalities and identity struggles. Her collaborative work on women's religious communities in Quebec has highlighted the contribution of their free work to the establishment of Quebec society.

Juteau has also been visiting professor at the University of Paris III, at the Free University of Berlin and at York University (in Toronto). Currently retired, she remains very active in the academic world. Her research focuses on the following themes: theorization of ethnicity; social, ethnic and national relations; gender relations and majority-minority relations; and citizenship and pluralism.

== Awards and prizes ==
- 1980 – University of Ottawa Teaching Excellence Award
- 1996 – Member of the Royal Society of Canada
- 2001 – ACFAS (French-Canadian Association for the Advancement of Science) Prix Marcel Vincent
- 2003 – Fellow of the Pierre Elliott Trudeau Foundation
- 2014 – Member of the Order of Canada
