= Chad Kilger =

Canadian ice hockey player (born 1976)

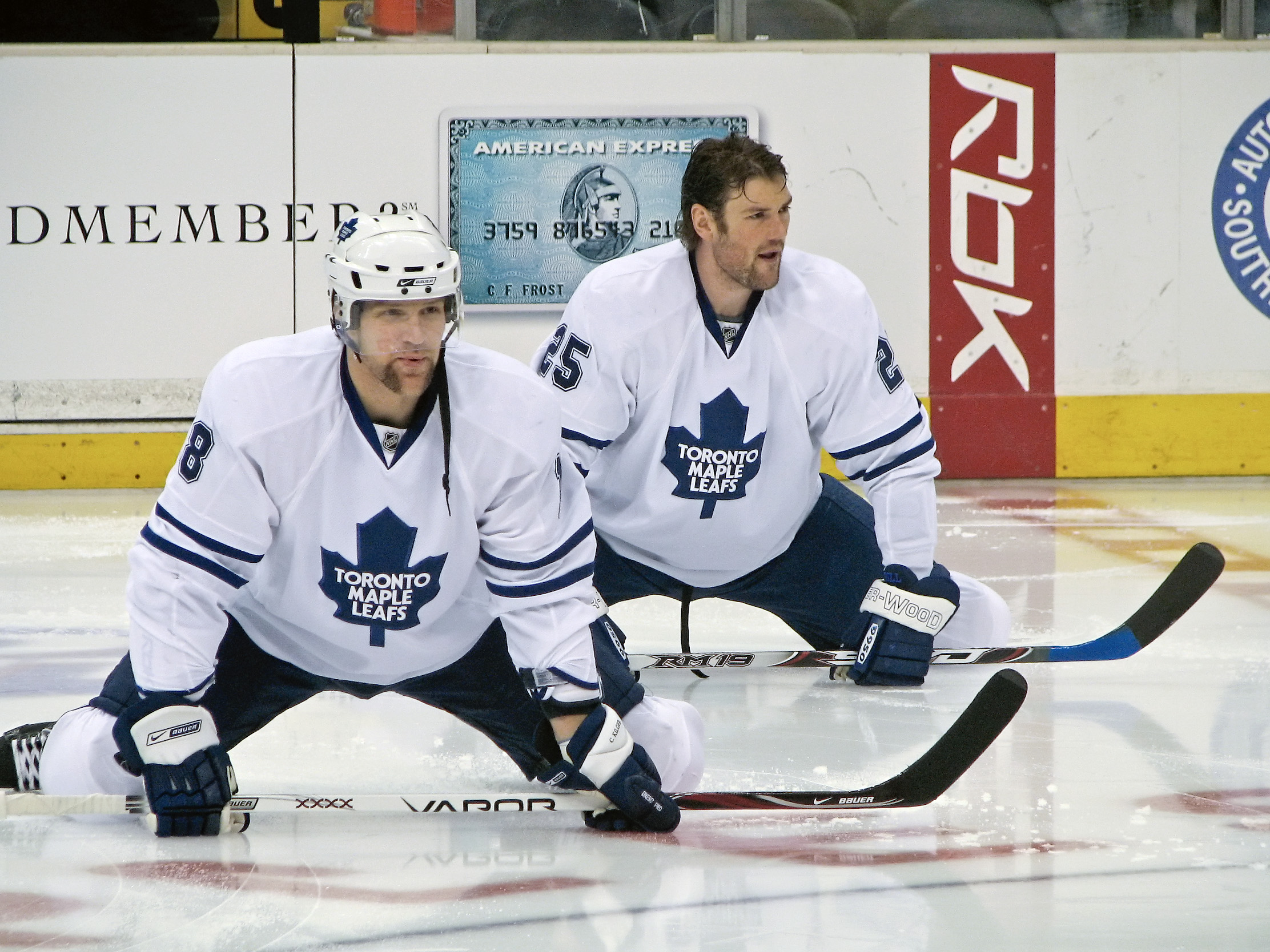
- Kilger (left) alongside Hal Gill in 2008.
- Born: November 27, 1976 (age 49) Cornwall, Ontario, Canada
- Height: 6 ft 4 in (193 cm)
- Weight: 224 lb (102 kg; 16 st 0 lb)
- Position: Right Wing
- Shot: Left
- Played for: Mighty Ducks of Anaheim; Winnipeg Jets; Phoenix Coyotes; Chicago Blackhawks; Edmonton Oilers; Montreal Canadiens; Toronto Maple Leafs
- NHL draft: 4th overall, 1995; Mighty Ducks of Anaheim
- Playing career: 1995–2008

Chad William Lawrence Kilger (born November 27, 1976) is a Canadian former professional ice hockey player. He played for several National Hockey League (NHL) teams, most recently the Toronto Maple Leafs.

== Playing career ==
As a youth, Kilger played in the 1990 Quebec International Pee-Wee Hockey Tournament with the Seaway Valley minor ice hockey team from Cornwall, Ontario.

Kilger played two seasons of junior ice hockey in the Ontario Hockey League with the Kingston Frontenacs. He was subsequently drafted fourth overall by the Mighty Ducks of Anaheim in the 1995 NHL entry draft. He made the team that fall, but on 7 February 1996 he was traded with Oleg Tverdovsky and a third-round draft pick to the Winnipeg Jets for Teemu Selänne, Marc Chouinard and a fourth-round draft choice, and subsequently spent most of his playing time with Winnipeg's minor league affiliate, the Springfield Falcons.

Kilger's numbers did not improve until he was acquired by the Chicago Blackhawks. In 86 games in parts of two seasons with the Blackhawks, he scored 36 points. In March 1999, he was traded to the Edmonton Oilers with Daniel Cleary, Ethan Moreau, and Christian Laflamme for Boris Mironov, Dean McAmmond and Jonas Elofsson, and in December 2000, he was sent to the Montreal Canadiens for Sergei Zholtok. He had early success, but as his ice time dropped so did his point totals. In his first season with the Canadiens he averaged 17:57 in ice time. In March 2004, he was put on waivers and claimed by the Toronto Maple Leafs.

Kilger set the unofficial hockey record for the hardest shot on December 3, 2006, when he was clocked at 106.6 mph (171.6 km/h), beating the old record held by former Sharks defenseman Shawn Heins (106.0 mph; 170.6 km/h). The official NHL record was held at the time by former Washington Capitals defenceman Al Iafrate, whose record was 105.2 mph (169.3 km/h). Kilger's unofficial record was surpassed when Sheldon Souray fired a 106.7 mph (171.7 km/h) shot at the Edmonton Oilers' skills competition in 2009.

=== Failure to report to Florida ===
On the NHL trade deadline date, February 26, 2008, the Leafs dealt Kilger to the Florida Panthers for a third-round draft pick. He immediately requested a leave of absence from Panthers' management, which was granted. However, he did not report to the team at the pre-arranged time, and on March 5, the Panthers suspended him indefinitely without pay. Kilger failed to report to training camp at the beginning of the 2008–09 season, and was officially confirmed to be retired on July 10, 2009.

== Personal ==
Kilger and his family currently reside in Cornwall, Ontario, where all three of his children were born. His father, Bob Kilger was a former Liberal member of Parliament and formerly the mayor of the city of Cornwall. Chad was hired as a firefighter for the City of Cornwall post retirement.

== Career statistics ==
| | | | Regular season | | | | | Playoffs |
| Season | Team | League | GP | G | A | Pts | PIM | GP | G | A | Pts | PIM |
|---|---|---|---|---|---|---|---|---|---|---|---|---|
| 1992–93 | Cornwall Colts | CJHL | 55 | 30 | 36 | 66 | 26 | 6 | 0 | 0 | 0 | 0 |
| 1993–94 | Kingston Frontenacs | OHL | 66 | 17 | 35 | 52 | 23 | 6 | 7 | 2 | 9 | 8 |
| 1994–95 | Kingston Frontenacs | OHL | 65 | 42 | 53 | 95 | 6 | 5 | 2 | 7 | 10 | 0 |
| 1995–96 | Mighty Ducks of Anaheim | NHL | 45 | 5 | 7 | 12 | 22 | — | — | — | — | — |
| 1995–96 | Winnipeg Jets | NHL | 29 | 2 | 3 | 5 | 12 | 4 | 1 | 0 | 1 | 0 |
| 1996–97 | Springfield Falcons | AHL | 52 | 17 | 28 | 45 | 36 | 16 | 5 | 7 | 12 | 56 |
| 1997–98 | Springfield Falcons | AHL | 35 | 14 | 14 | 28 | 33 | — | — | — | — | — |
| 1997–98 | Phoenix Coyotes | NHL | 10 | 0 | 1 | 1 | 4 | — | — | — | — | — |
| 1997–98 | Chicago Blackhawks | NHL | 22 | 3 | 8 | 11 | 6 | — | — | — | — | — |
| 1998–99 | Chicago Blackhawks | NHL | 64 | 14 | 11 | 25 | 30 | — | — | — | — | — |
| 1998–99 | Edmonton Oilers | NHL | 13 | 1 | 1 | 2 | 4 | 4 | 0 | 0 | 0 | 4 |
| 1999–2000 | Edmonton Oilers | NHL | 40 | 3 | 2 | 5 | 18 | 3 | 0 | 0 | 0 | 0 |
| 1999–2000 | Hamilton Bulldogs | AHL | 7 | 4 | 2 | 6 | 4 | — | — | — | — | — |
| 2000–01 | Edmonton Oilers | NHL | 34 | 5 | 2 | 7 | 17 | — | — | — | — | — |
| 2000–01 | Montreal Canadiens | NHL | 43 | 9 | 16 | 25 | 34 | — | — | — | — | — |
| 2001–02 | Montreal Canadiens | NHL | 75 | 8 | 15 | 23 | 27 | 12 | 0 | 1 | 1 | 9 |
| 2002–03 | Montreal Canadiens | NHL | 60 | 9 | 7 | 16 | 21 | — | — | — | — | — |
| 2003–04 | Montreal Canadiens | NHL | 36 | 2 | 2 | 4 | 14 | — | — | — | — | — |
| 2003–04 | Hamilton Bulldogs | AHL | 2 | 1 | 0 | 1 | 0 | — | — | — | — | — |
| 2003–04 | Toronto Maple Leafs | NHL | 5 | 1 | 1 | 2 | 2 | 13 | 2 | 1 | 3 | 0 |
| 2005–06 | Toronto Maple Leafs | NHL | 79 | 17 | 11 | 28 | 63 | — | — | — | — | — |
| 2006–07 | Toronto Maple Leafs | NHL | 82 | 14 | 14 | 28 | 58 | — | — | — | — | — |
| 2007–08 | Toronto Maple Leafs | NHL | 53 | 10 | 7 | 17 | 18 | — | — | — | — | — |
| OHL totals | | | 131 | 59 | 88 | 147 | 118 | 12 | 12 | 4 | 16 | 18 |
| NHL totals | | | 690 | 103 | 108 | 211 | 350 | 36 | 3 | 2 | 5 | 18 |

| Preceded by Oleg Tverdovsky | Anaheim Ducks first-round draft pick 1995 | Succeeded by Ruslan Salei |
