= Marguerite Mendell =

Canadian economist (born 1947)

- Born: November 2, 1947 (age 78); Paris, France
- Education: Concordia University (BA); McGill University (PhD)
- Occupations: Economist, academic

Marguerite Mendell (born 2 November 1947) is a Canadian economist and Distinguished Professor Emerita at Concordia University in Montreal, Quebec. She is known for her work on the social and solidarity economy, social finance and economic democracy, and for co-founding Concordia's Karl Polanyi Institute of Political Economy in 1988.

== Early life and education ==
Mendell was born in Paris and moved to Quebec as a child. She completed undergraduate studies in economics at Concordia University in 1972 and earned a PhD in economics from McGill University in 1983.

== Career ==
Mendell has taught at Concordia's School of Community and Public Affairs since 1986.

In 1988, she co-founded the Karl Polanyi Institute of Political Economy at Concordia, which serves as the repository for the Karl Polanyi Archive.

Her work combines academic research with policy and community-oriented initiatives in areas including the social economy, social finance and impact investing. Concordia has described her as active in international dialogue through conferences and meetings involving organisations such as the OECD and the European Commission.

Mendell has also been associated with the development of microcredit and solidarity finance initiatives in Montreal. A Global Social Economy Forum profile credits her with co-founding the Montreal Community Loan Association in 1990 and collaborating to establish the solidarity finance network CAP Finance in 2009.

== Honours and awards ==
- 2012 – Prix Pierre-Dansereau .
- 2013 – Prix du Québec.
- 2014 – Officer of the National Order of Quebec .
- 2017 – Member of the Order of Canada.
- 2024 – Officer of the Ordre de Montréal.
