= Roxanne R. Fairweather =

Canadian businesswoman

- Born: Saint John, New Brunswick
- Education: B.A., University of Toronto
- Known for: co-CEO of Innovatia

Roxanne R. Fairweather CM ONB is a Canadian businesswoman. She is the co-CEO of Innovatia.

== Early life and education ==
Fairweather was born and raised in Saint John, New Brunswick as one of seven children. She earned her Bachelor of Arts degree from the University of Toronto.

== Career ==
In 2001, Fairweather was appointed the chief operating officer of Innovatia after serving as president of Aliant Wireless. In 2009, Fairweather and David Grebenc assumed full ownership of Innovatia from Bell Aliant Regional Communications Income Fund. Simultaneously, she served as the board chair of FacilicorpNB Ltd. from 2009 to 2013, which worked alongside the New Brunswick government. In her final year with FacilicorpNB, Fairweather's Innovatia hired nearly an entire IT class from the New Brunswick Community College. She also sat as the chair of the University of New Brunswick’s Board of Governors from 2010 until 2012.

In 2014, Fairweather was the recipient of the Order of New Brunswick for her contributions to the business landscape in New Brunswick and named one of the Top 50 CEOs by Atlantic Business magazine. She also collaborated with Achieve Literacy Greater Saint John to raised local children's reading levels and was inducted into the New Brunswick Business Hall of Fame. The following year, she was appointed Chair of Opportunities NB to support and increase job creation and economic growth in the province.

In 2017, Fairweather was named co-chair of Women For 50%, an organization whose goals are to increase female participation in elections. She was subsequently the recipient of the 2018 New Brunswick Humanitarian Award for her advocacy work in early childhood literacy, anti-poverty and gender parity. In the following year, Fairweather was named a Member of the Order of Canada for "her commitment to advancing research and innovation and for creating new and sustainable economic opportunities in Atlantic Canada."
