= Jean Chamberlain Froese =

Canadian obstetrician

- Born: March 27, 1965 (age 61); St. Thomas, Ontario, Canada
- Spouse: Thomas Froese (m. 2001)

Academic background
- Education: BSc, biochemistry, 1991, University of Toronto; MD, 1991, University of Toronto Faculty of Medicine

Jean Chamberlain Froese (born March 27, 1965) is a Canadian obstetrician.

== Early life and education ==
Chamberlain Froese was born on March 27, 1965, in St. Thomas, Ontario, Canada. She grew up in Scarborough as the third of four children born into a middle-class family. She graduated from Peoples Christian Academy in 1984 and enrolled at the University of Toronto for her bachelor's degree in biochemistry. After graduating with her medical degree from the University of Toronto Faculty of Medicine in 1991, Chamberlain Froese completed her residency in Obstetrics and Gynecology. Following her residency, she worked in Yemen, Zimbabwe, Zambia and Pakistan, and continued to spend her career as an obstetrician/gynecologist advocating for mothers and their babies in lower-middle-income countries.

== Career ==
Following her international studies, Chamberlain Froese joined the Department of Obstetrics and Gynecology at McMaster University in 1996 as an assistant professor. From 2005 to 2017, Chamberlain Froese and her family divided their time between Uganda and Canada. As an assistant professor in McMaster University, she established Save the Mothers International to assist African women with pregnancy and childbirth complications. The non-profit also runs the Mother Baby Friendly Hospital Initiative to improve the safety of labour rooms, equipment, and quality of care. She also developed the first African Master of Public Health Leadership curriculum for multi-disciplinary learners at Uganda Christian University. In 2009, Chamberlain Froese was named the recipient of the Teasdale-Corti Humanitarian Award as a Canadian physician "who goes beyond the accepted norms of routine practice to exemplify altruism and integrity, courage and perseverance in the alleviation of human suffering."

As a result of her efforts to "advance maternal health, notably through the creation of an academic program based in Uganda that promotes safe motherhood," Chamberlain Froese was named a Members of the Order of Canada in 2014. Following this, she joined MacGLOBAS in 2017 to help them establish collaborative partnerships with health providers and institutions in Uganda.

== Personal life ==
Chamberlain Froese met her future husband, journalist Thomas Froese, on Victoria Day in 2000 through the Over-30 Unclaimed Precious Jewels Club. They eventually married on July 29, 2001, and have three children together. Chamberlain Froese is a Christian.

== Selected publications ==
- Game Changers
- Where Have All the Mothers Gone
