= Rina Arseneault =

Canadian social worker and activist

- Born: New Brunswick, Canada
- Education: Université de Moncton
- Occupation: Sociologist
- Employer: Order of Canada
- Known for: Activism against family violence
- Awards: Canadian Association of Social Workers Distinguished Service Award; Governor General's Awards in Commemoration of the Persons Case; Muriel McQueen Fergusson Foundation Award

Rina Arseneault CM is a Canadian social worker, researcher, activist, and educator. She is the associate director at the University of New Brunswick’s Murial McQueen Fergusson Centre for Family Violence Research. In 2013, Arseneault was appointed a Member of the Order of Canada.

== Early life and education ==
Arseneault was born in New Brunswick, Canada, as one of 14 children. She was often treated differently than her brothers and faced gender discrimination from her father, who wanted her to end her education after grade 10. Arseneault was forced to leave home and she negotiated with an elderly neighbour who allowed her to live with her if she took care of the housework. Arseneault earned her Bachelor of Arts and Master's degree in social work from the Université de Moncton while working at Crossroads for Women/Carrefour our femmes, Inc., a shelter for abused women and their children.

== Career ==
In 1993, Arseneault joined the Muriel McQueen Fergusson Centre for Family Violence Research, at UNB in their inaugural opening year after being convinced by the Chair of the New Brunswick Coalition of Transition House. While there, she was the recipient of the 1997 NB Advisory Council on the Status of Women Recognition Award for her contribution to improving the status of women in New Brunswick. A few years later, she was awarded the 2002 Muriel McQueen Fergusson Foundation Award for "outstanding contributions toward preventing and eliminating family violence in Canada."

In 2013, Arseneault was appointed a Member of the Order of Canada. Three years later, she received the Canadian Association of Social Workers Distinguished Service Award. While working for the Murial McQueen Fergusson Centre for Family Violence Research, Arseneault helped conduct a study which showed that women in rural New Brunswick had more difficulty escaping violence than those in urban areas. Two years later, she was selected to attend United Nations Commission on the Status of Women. In December 2018, Arseneault was the recipient of the Governor General's Awards in Commemoration of the Persons Case. She retired from the Muriel McQueen Fergusson Centre January 1st, 2029.

== Personal life ==
Arseneault and her husband Dan have three sons together.
