= Bob Kilger =

Canadian politician (1944–2021)

The Honourable Bob Kilger PC

Mayor of Cornwall
- In office November 13, 2006 – October 27, 2014
- Preceded by: Phil Poirier
- Succeeded by: Leslie O'Shaughnessy

Deputy Speaker of the House of Commons of Canada Chair of Committees of the Whole
- In office January 30, 2001 – May 23, 2004
- Speaker: Peter Milliken
- Preceded by: Peter Milliken (2000)
- Succeeded by: Chuck Strahl

Chief Government Whip
- In office October 23, 1996 – January 14, 2001
- Prime Minister: Jean Chrétien
- Preceded by: Don Boudria
- Succeeded by: Marlene Catterall

Member of Parliament for Stormont—Dundas—Charlottenburgh (Stormont—Dundas; 1988–2000)
- In office November 21, 1988 – June 28, 2004
- Preceded by: Norman Warner
- Succeeded by: Guy Lauzon (Stormont—Dundas—South Glengarry)

Personal details
- Born: Robert Peter Paul Kilger; June 29, 1944 Cornwall, Ontario, Canada
- Died: November 29, 2021 (aged 77)
- Party: Liberal
- Portfolio: Chief Government Whip (1996–2001); Deputy Speaker and Chairman of Committees of the Whole of the House of Commons (2001–2004)

Robert Peter Paul Kilger PC (June 29, 1944 – November 29, 2021) was a Canadian politician.

Born in Cornwall, Ontario, Kilger was the former Liberal member of Parliament for the Cornwall region, representing the riding Stormont—Dundas—South Glengarry from 2000 to 2004, and Stormont—Dundas from 1988 to 2000. He was Chief Government Whip, and Deputy Speaker and Chairman of Committees of the Whole of the House of Commons.

He lost his seat in the 2004 election to Conservative candidate Guy Lauzon. Prior to his political life, he was a businessman and also had a varied hockey career. He played professionally in the minor leagues, became an NHL official, and later coached the Cornwall Royals to a Memorial Cup victory in 1981. His son was former National Hockey League forward Chad Kilger.

Kilger was elected Mayor of the City of Cornwall on November 13, 2006, with 49.4 per cent of the popular vote. He was re-elected on October 25, 2010. On October 27, 2014, Kilger lost the 2014 mayoral race to Leslie O'Shaughnessy by nearly 1000 votes. He died on November 29, 2021, at the age of 77, from cancer, which he was first diagnosed with 11 years prior.
