= 2006 IIHF World Championship =

2006 edition of the IIHF World Championship

Tournament details
- Host country: Latvia
- Venues: 2 (in 1 host city)
- Dates: 5–21 May
- Opened by: Vaira Vīķe-Freiberga
- Teams: 16

Final positions
- Champions: Sweden (8th title)
- Runners-up: Czech Republic
- Third place: Finland
- Fourth place: Canada

Tournament statistics
- Games played: 56
- Goals scored: 329 (5.88 per game)
- Attendance: 324,794 (5,800 per game)
- Scoring leader: (Canada) Sidney Crosby (16 points)

Awards
- MVP: (Sweden) Niklas Kronwall

The 2006 IIHF World Championship was held in between 5–21 May 2006 in Riga, Latvia. It was the 70th annual event, and was run by the International Ice Hockey Federation (IIHF).

One of the requirements of the IIHF for Latvia to host the event was that a new arena would be constructed. Sweden was the stand-by organizer in case the arena was delayed, but the construction was completed on schedule, marking the first time a former Soviet state apart from Russia has hosted the event. The mascot of the championships was a beaver called RIX (after Riga International Airport's IATA code.)

Sweden shut out the Czech Republic 4-0 in the Gold Medal Game to win the IIHF World Championships. Sweden had won the 2006 Winter Olympic Men's Ice Hockey Gold 3-2 versus Finland in Turin, Italy two months earlier. They therefore became the first hockey team to win both the Winter Olympics and the IIHF World Championships in the same year.

== Venues ==
Arena Riga Capacity: 10,300	2006 IIHF World Championship is located in Riga	Skonto Hall Capacity: 6,500
Latvia – Riga	2006 IIHF World Championship is located in Riga	Latvia – Riga

== Nations ==
The following 16 nations qualified for the elite hockey tournament – 13 nations from Europe, two nations from North America and one nation from Asia are represented.

Asia

- Kazakhstan (Note: Automatic qualifier after a top 14 placement at the 2005 IIHF World Championship)

Europe

- Czech Republic
- Denmark
- Belarus
- Finland
- Latvia (Note: Qualified as hosts (and as automatic qualifier))
- Italy (Note: Qualified through winning a promotion at the 2005 IIHF World Championship Division I)
- Norway
- Russia
- Slovenia
- Slovakia
- Sweden
- Switzerland
- Ukraine

North America

- Canada
- United States

== Preliminary round ==
Sixteen participating teams were placed in the following four groups. After playing a round-robin, the top three teams in each group advanced to the qualifying round. The last team in each group competed in the relegation round.

Groups A and D were played in Kloten, groups B and C in Berne.

=== Group A ===
Team	Pld	W	D	L	GF	GA	GD	Pts	Qualification
Finland	3	2	1	0	13	6	+7	5	Qualifying round
Czech Republic	3	1	2	0	9	8	+1	4	Qualifying round
Latvia	3	1	1	1	6	7	−1	3	Qualifying round
Slovenia	3	0	0	3	8	15	−7	0	Relegation round

Source: IIHF

All times local (UTC +3)

5 May 2006; 17:15	Finland	5–3 (1–2, 2–1, 2–0)	Slovenia	Arena Riga; Attendance: 5386

Game reference

Fredrik Norrena
Goalies
Robert Kristan
Referee:
(Russia) Alexander Poliakov

	0–1	7:10 - A. Kranjc (A. Kopitar) (PP1)
	0–2	14:41 - A. Kopitar (M. Sotlar, M. Rodman) (PP1)
17:07 - T. Kallio (P. Nummelin (PP1)	1–2
25:03 - A. Miettinen (J. Jokinen) (PP1)	2–2
	2–3	27:21 - A. Kopitar (T. Razingar, M. Rodman) (PP1)
37:44 - S. Bergenheim (M. Lehtonen)	3–3
41:56 - T. Kallio (A. Miettinen, J. Jokinen) (PP1)	4–3
53:16 - M. Lehtonen (J. Viuhkola) (PP1)	5–3

18 min
Penalties
30 min
49
Shots
16

5 May 2006; 21:15	Latvia	1–1 (1–1, 0–0, 0–0)	Czech Republic	Arena Riga; Attendance: 10669

Game reference
Sergejs Naumovs	Goalies	Milan Hnilička	Referee: (Canada) Brent Reiber
6:22 - A. Sirokovs / 1–0; / 1–1 / 19:32 - D. Výborný			Referee: (Canada) Brent Reiber
22 min	Penalties	6 min	Referee: (Canada) Brent Reiber
12	Shots	32	Referee: (Canada) Brent Reiber

7 May 2006; 16:15	Czech Republic	5–4 (4–1, 1–2, 0–1)	Slovenia	Arena Riga; Attendance: 9018

Game reference

Milan Hnilička
Goalies
Gaber Glavic
Robert Kristan
Referee:
(Germany) Richard Schuetz

1:09 - T. Plekanec (J. Hlaváč, T. Kaberle)	1–0
3:04 - J. Balaštík (T. Kaberle, M. Erat) (PP1)	2–0
10:35 - M. Erat (D. Výborný, T. Kaberle) (PP1)	3–0
13:23 - Z. Michálek (M. Erat, D. Výborný) (PP1)	4–0
	4–1	14:30 - E. Murič (T. Hafner)
	4–2	20:24 - M. Sotlar (T. Razingar, A. Kopitar) (PP1)
24:28 - Z. Michalek (M. Erat, J. Balaštík) (PP1)	5–2
	5–3	34:54 - A. Kranjc (A. Kopitar, T. Razingar)
	5–4	59:59 - T. Razingar (U. Vidmar)

10 min
Penalties
18 min
41
Shots
16

7 May 2006; 20:15	Finland	5–0 (0–0, 2–0, 3–0)	Latvia	Arena Riga; Attendance: 10,616

Game reference

Antero Niittymäki
Goalies
Sergejs Naumovs
Referee:
(Canada) Chris Savage

24:32 - J. Viuhkola (J. Hentunen, M. Lehtonen) (PP1)	1–0
35:02 - T. Kallio (SH1)	2–0
48:38 - V. Peltonen (P. Nummelin) (PP1)	3–0
51:51 - A. Berg (P. Nummelin, J. Jokinen) (PP1)	4–0
55:10 - J. Rita (E. Pirnes)	5–0

47 min
Penalties
20 min
41
Shots
18

9 May 2006; 16:15	Slovenia	1–5 (1–0, 0–4, 0–1)	Latvia	Arena Riga; Attendance: 9539

Game reference

Robert Kristan
Goalies
Sergejs Naumovs
Referee:
(Sweden) Marcus Vinnerborg

5:35 - Sivic (Zagar)	1–0
	1–1	24:15 - A. Semjonovs (A. Ņiživijs, M. Rēdlihs)
	1–2	28:20 - M. Cipulis (J. Sprukts)
	1–3	29:51 - A. Jerofejevs (L. Tambijevs, A. Ņiživijs) (PP)
	1–4	37:51 - L. Tambijevs (A. Ņiživijs)
	1–5	50:06 - H. Vasiļjevs (A. Sirokovs, A. Tribuncovs) (PP2)

24 min
Penalties
16 min
18
Shots
29

9 May 2006; 20:15	Czech Republic	3–3 (2–1, 1–0, 0–2)	Finland	Arena Riga; Attendance: 6758

Game reference

Milan Hnilička
Goalies
Antero Niittymäki
Referee:
(Slovakia) Peter Jonak

2:28 - M. Erat (J. Balaštík) (PP1)	1–0
2:52 - J. Balaštík (J. Hlinka)	2–0
	2–1	8:19 - L. Kukkonen (M. Lehtonen, J. Hentunen) (PP1)
34:41 - J. Hlaváč (D. Výborný)	3–1
	3–2	40:30 - A. Berg (P. Nummelin, J. Jokinen) (PP1)
	3–3	58:48 - P. Nummelin (J. Jokinen)

24 min
Penalties
18 min
27
Shots
24

=== Group B ===
Team	Pld	W	D	L	GF	GA	GD	Pts	Qualification
Sweden	3	2	1	0	12	6	+6	5	Qualifying round
Switzerland	3	2	1	0	9	6	+3	5	Qualifying round
Ukraine	3	1	0	2	7	8	−1	2	Qualifying round
Italy	3	0	0	3	3	11	−8	0	Relegation round

Source: IIHF

All times local (UTC +3)

6 May 2006; 16:15	Switzerland	3–1 (0–0, 0–1, 3–0)	Italy	Skonto Arena; Attendance: 4450

Game reference

David Aebischer
Goalies
Jason Muzzatti
Referee:
(United States) Rick Looker

	0–1	30:18 - A. Iob (G. de Bettin, J. Parco) (PP1)
44:56 - I. Rüthemann (S. Jeannin, M. Plüss)	1–1
52:31 - P. Della Rossa	2–1
59:40 - M. Plüss (I. Rüthemann, S. Blindenbacher)	3–1

24 min
Penalties
26 min
41
Shots
14

6 May 2006; 20:15	Ukraine	2–4 (1–1, 1–2, 0–1)	Sweden	Skonto Arena; Attendance: 3492

Game reference

Kostyantyn Simchuk
Goalies
Johan Holmqvist
Referee:
(Slovakia) Peter Jonak

	0–1	17:55 - F. Emvall (A. Karlsson) (PP1)
19:16 - K. Kasianchuk (Y. Dyachenko) (PP1)	1–1
	1–2	20:50 - Emvall (B. Melin) (PP1)
34:55 - A. Mikhov (O. Shafarenko)	2–2
	2–3	38:55 - A. Karlsson (B. Melin, R. Sundin) (PP1)
	2–4	46:38 - M. Hannula (J. Nordquist) (PP1)

18 min
Penalties
12 min
24
Shots
45

8 May 2006; 16:15	Switzerland	2–1 (2–0, 0–1, 0–0)	Ukraine	Skonto Arena; Attendance: 4609

Game reference

David Aebischer
Goalies
Igor Karpenko
Referee:
(Czech Republic) Milan Minar

9:57 - G. Bezina (S. Jeannin) (PP1)	1–0
18:06 - A. Ambühl (SH1)	2–0
	2–1	33:54 - A. Mikhnov (O. Materukhin, A. Sryubko)

30 min
Penalties
36 min
25
Shots
26

8 May 2006; 20:15	Sweden	4–0 (2–0, 1–0, 1–0)	Italy	Skonto Arena; Attendance: 3586

Game reference

Stefan Liv
Goalies
Jason Muzzatti
Thomas Tragust
Referee:
(United States) David Hansen

14:02 - A. Karlsson (N. Kronwall, J. Franzén) (PP1)	1–0
16:00 - J. Lundqvist (H. Zetterberg, M. Johansson) (PP1)	2–0
22:36 - K. Jönsson (A. Holmqvist, J. Franzén) (PP1)	3–0
47:19 - K. Jönsson (N. Kronwall)	4–0

14 min
Penalties
12 min
30
Shots
13

10 May 2006; 16:15	Italy	2–4 (0–1, 1–1, 1–2)	Ukraine	Skonto Arena; Attendance: 2174

Game reference

Jason Muzzatti
Goalies
Kostyantyn Simchuk
Referee:
(Canada) Chris Savage

	0–1	14:54 - K. Kasianchuck (V. Shakhraychuk, A. Ostroushko) (PP1)
	0–2	21:08 - R. Salnikov (V. Bobrovnikov, Y. Dyachenko) (PP1)
32:25 - G. Busillo (C. Trevisani, J. Cirone)	1–2
	1–3	51:11 - I. Gunko (V. Lytvynenko)
55:38 - C. Borgatello (A. Molteni) (PP1)	2–3
	2–4	57:56 - Y. Dyachenko (Gunko)

52 min
Penalties
42 min
21
Shots
27

10 May 2006; 20:15	Sweden	4–4 (1–0, 0–1, 3–3)	Switzerland	Skonto Arena; Attendance: 3031

Game reference

Johan Holmqvist
Goalies
David Aebischer
Referee:
(Russia) Alexander Poliakov

13:43 - H. Zetterberg (M. Johansson, N. Kronwall)	1–0
	1–1	23:19 - V. Wirz (M. Streit, R. Lemm) (PP2)
44:11 - H. Zetterberg	2–1
44:37 - J. Mattsson (A. Karlsson, N. Kronwall)	3–1
	3–2	45:02 - R. Sannitz (S. Jeannin, M. Streit)
51:16 - A. Karlsson (F. Emvall, N. Kronwall)	4–2
	4–3	51:35 - I. Rüthemann (M. Plüss, P. Della Rossa)
	4–4	56:44 - R. Sannitz (S. Jeannin, R. Lemm)

12 min
Penalties
14 min
29
Shots
17

=== Group C ===
Team	Pld	W	D	L	GF	GA	GD	Pts	Qualification
Russia	3	3	0	0	17	6	+11	6	Qualifying round
Belarus	3	2	0	1	11	5	+6	4	Qualifying round
Slovakia	3	1	0	2	10	6	+4	2	Qualifying round
Kazakhstan	3	0	0	3	2	23	−21	0	Relegation round

Source: IIHF

All times local (UTC +3)

6 May 2006; 16:15	Belarus	2–1 (0–0, 2–1, 0–0)	Slovakia	Arena Riga; Attendance: 6,960

Game reference

Andrei Mezin
Goalies
Ján Lašák
Karol Križan
Referee:
(United States) David Hansen

34:18 - D. Meleshko (A. Zhurik) (PP1)	1–0
	1–1	37:29 - I. Čiernik (M. Kováčik, R. Kapuš)
39:27 - O. Antonenko (A. Skabelka, M. Grabovsky) (PP1)	2–1

12 min
Penalties
18 min
36
Shots
13

6 May 2006; 20:15	Russia	10–1 (4–1, 4–0, 2–0)	Kazakhstan	Arena Riga; Attendance: 7,190

Game reference

Sergei Zvyagin
Alexander Fomichev
Goalies
Roman Medvedev
Sergey Tambulov
Referee:
(Finland) Jari Levonen

1:36 - A. Ovechkin (E. Malkin, M. Sushinsky) (PP1)	1–0
2:44 - D. Arkipov (I. Nikulin) (PP1)	2–0
10:44 - K. Gorovikov (I. Grigorenko)	3–0
	3–1	17:40 - Y. Koreshkov (A. Koreshkov, T. Zhailauov) (PP1)
18:48 - D. Bykov (A. Kruchinin, I. Yemeleyev) (PP1)	4–1
24:13 - A. Ovechkin (E. Malkin)	5–1
26:41 - E. Malkin (SH1)	6–1
29:39 - A. Ovechkin (E. Malkin) (PP1)	7–1
32:24 - A. Semin (D. Arkhipov, I. Nikulin)	8–1
44:38 - A. Semin (I. Nikulin, D. Zaripov)	9–1
53:52 - A. Semin (D. Zaripov, I. Nikulin) (PP1)	10–1

26 min
Penalties
40 min
27
Shots
17

8 May 2006; 16:15	Russia	3–2 (1–0, 0–2, 2–0)	Belarus	Arena Riga; Attendance: 7,945

Game reference

Sergei Zvyagin
Goalies
Andrei Mezin
Referee:
(Canada) Chris Savage

10:57 - I. Yemeleyev (D. Bykov) (PP1)	1–0
	1–1	21:40 - O. Antonenko (A. Kostitsyn) (PP2)
	1–2	23:28 - A. Makritsky (U. Denisov, E. Kurilin)
43:28 - D. Kulyash (K. Gorovikov) (PP1)	2–2
53:19 - A. Kharitonov (I. Yemeleyev)	3–2

16 min
Penalties
20 min
28
Shots
15

8 May 2006; 20:15	Slovakia	6–0 (0–0, 3–0, 3–0)	Kazakhstan	Arena Riga; Attendance: 6,788

Game reference

Karol Križan
Goalies
Sergey Ogureshnikov
Referee:
(Sweden) Marcus Vinnerborg

20:41 - R. Kapuš (Mari. Hossa, Marc. Hossa) (PP1)	1–0
32:42 - T. Surový (R. Pavlikovský, M. Bartovič) (PP1)	2–0
39:48 - M. Bartovič (R. Pavlikovský, Mari. Hossa)	3–0
49:05 - R. Pavlikovský (M. Zálešák, I. Čiernik)	4–0
55:06 - M. Kováčik	5–0
56:22 - M. Jurčina (T. Surový)	6–0

14 min
Penalties
32 min
52
Shots
8

10 May 2006; 16:15	Slovakia	3–4 (2–2, 1–1, 0–1)	Russia	Arena Riga; Attendance: 7,467

Game reference

Karol Križan
Goalies
Sergei Zvyagin
Referee:
(Canada) Brett Reiber

	0–1	3:56 - D. Kulyash (I. Grigorenko, V. Khomitsky) (PP1)
6:00 - T. Surový (M. Cibák)	1–1
9:03 - A. Kollar (SH1)	2–1
	2–2	17:26 - E. Malkin
	2–3	27:23 - D. Zaripov (V. Khomitsky) (PP1)
36:45 - I. Čiernik (D. Milo) (PP1)	3–3
	3–4	46:22 - A. Mikhnov (D. Arkhipov, A. Semin) (PP1)

22 min
Penalties
41 min
27
Shots
25

10 May 2006; 20:15	Kazakhstan	1–7 (1–1, 0–3, 0–3)	Belarus	Arena Riga; Attendance: 6359

Game reference

Sergey Ogureshnikov
Sergey Tambulov
Goalies
Andrei Mezin
Referee:
(United States) Rick Looker

	0–1	2:07 - Kostitsyn (Skabelka, Kopat) (PP1)
18:57 - Spiridonov (Krasnoslabotsev, Pupkov)	1–1
	1–2	29:08 - Zadelenov (Makritsky, Mezin) (SH1)
	1–3	34:28 - Chupris (Zadelenov, Erkovich) (PP1)
	1–4	39:25 - Grabovsky (Kostyuchenok) (PP1)
	1–5	45:11 - Zadelenov (Grabovsky, Ugarov)
	1–6	46:13 - Dudik (Mikhalev, Ugarov)
	1–7	48:42 - Grabovsky

22 min
Penalties
39 min
32
Shots
35

=== Group D ===
Team	Pld	W	D	L	GF	GA	GD	Pts	Qualification
Canada	3	3	0	0	14	5	+9	6	Qualifying round
United States	3	2	0	1	7	3	+4	4	Qualifying round
Norway	3	1	0	2	8	13	−5	2	Qualifying round
Denmark	3	0	0	3	6	14	−8	0	Relegation round

Source: IIHF

All times local (UTC +3)

5 May 2006; 16:15	United States	3–1 (0–1, 1–0, 2–0)	Norway	Skonto Arena; Attendance: 4300

Game reference

Craig Anderson
Goalies
Pal Grotnes
Referee:
(Sweden) Marcus Vinnerborg

	0–1	13:32 - Jakobsen (Holtet) (PP1)
21:21 - Brown (Hilbert) (PP1)	1–1
45:42 - Brown (PP1)	2–1
55:46 - Brown (Malone, Komisarek) (PP1)	3–1

18 min
Penalties
16 min
31
Shots
21

5 May 2006; 20:15	Denmark	3–5 (0–3, 3–0, 0–2)	Canada	Skonto Arena; Attendance: 3427

Game reference

Peter Hirsch
Goalies
Marc Denis
Referee:
(Czech Republic) Milan Minar

	0–1	5:01 - Boyes (Bergeron, Stuart) (PP1)
	0–2	7:18 - Crosby (Boyes, Bergeron) (PP2)
	0–3	13:41 - Comrie (DuPont)
27:43 - F. Nielsen (Kjaergaard) (SH1)	1–3
30:46 - J. Nielsen (Johnsen, Kjaergaard) (PP1)	2–3
37:49 - Staal (Green)	3–3
	3–4	43:17 - Crosby (Bergeron)
	3–5	53:09 - Richards (Carter)

16 min
Penalties
10 min
23
Shots
44

7 May 2006; 16:15	United States	3–0 (0–0, 2–0, 1–0)	Denmark	Skonto Arena; Attendance: 3886

Game reference

Craig Anderson
Goalies
Peter Hirsch
Referee:
(Canada) Brent Reiber

20:33 - Alberts (Brown)	1–0
26:32 - Stastny (Suter, Kelser)	2–0
52:52 - Park (Hilbert)	3–0

12 min
Penalties
14 min
37
Shots
19

7 May 2006; 20:15	Canada	7–1 (3–0, 4–0, 0–1)	Norway	Skonto Arena; Attendance: 3983

Game reference

Alex Auld
Goalies
Pal Grotnes
Mathias Gundersen
Referee:
(Russia) Alexander Poliakov

8:09 - Bergeron (Robidas, Crosby) (PP1)	1–0
8:33 - Boyes (Crosby)	2–0
13:35 - Comrie	3–0
21:05 - Crosby (Bergeron, Hamhuis)	4–0
23:00 - Williams (Comrie, Hamhuis) (PP1)	5–0
31:56 - Bergeron (Crosby, Schultz)	6–0
33:53 - Shanahan (Cammalleri) (PP1)	7–0
	7–1	47:42 - Thoresen (Ask) (PP2)

14 min
Penalties
26 min
36
Shots
15

9 May 2006; 16:15	Norway	6–3 (1–2, 3–0, 2–1)	Denmark	Skonto Arena; Attendance: 3885

Game reference

Mathias Gundersen
Goalies
Peter Hirsch
Referee:
(Germany) Richard Schuetz

16:36 - Trygg (Myrvold, Vikingstad) (PP1)	1–0
	1–1	17:30 - Green (D. Nielsen) (PP1)
	1–2	19:59 - Staal (Green) (PP2)
28:41 - Hansen (Bastiansen, Ask) (PP1)	2–2
30:02 - Skrøder (Trygg, Vikingstad) (PP1)	3–2
33:34 - Thoresen (Vikingstad, Myrvold) (PP1)	4–2
41:08 - Holtet (Bastiansen, Ask)	5–2
	5–3	43:43 - Hansen (D. Nielsen) (PP1)
59:18 - Vikingstad (Trygg)	6–3

20 min
Penalties
18 min
45
Shots
23

9 May 2006; 20:15	Canada	2–1 (0–1, 1–0, 1–0)	United States	Skonto Arena; Attendance: 4553

Game reference

Alex Auld
Goalies
Jason Bacashihua
Referee:
(Finland) Jari Levonen

	0–1	13:53 - Kessel (Slater, Stafford)
29:01 - Crosby (Bergeron)	1–1
47:44 - Shanahan (Cammalleri, Williams) (PP1)	2–1

16 min
Penalties
18 min
30
Shots
19

== Qualifying round ==
The top three teams from each group in the preliminary round advance to the qualifying round. The top three teams from Groups A and D advance to Group E, and the top three teams from Groups B and C advance to Group F.

Teams in the qualifying round carry forward the results and points gained in the preliminary round with the teams that they have played and advance with. Teams, which have played in the preliminary round, do not meet again in the qualifying round.

=== Group E ===
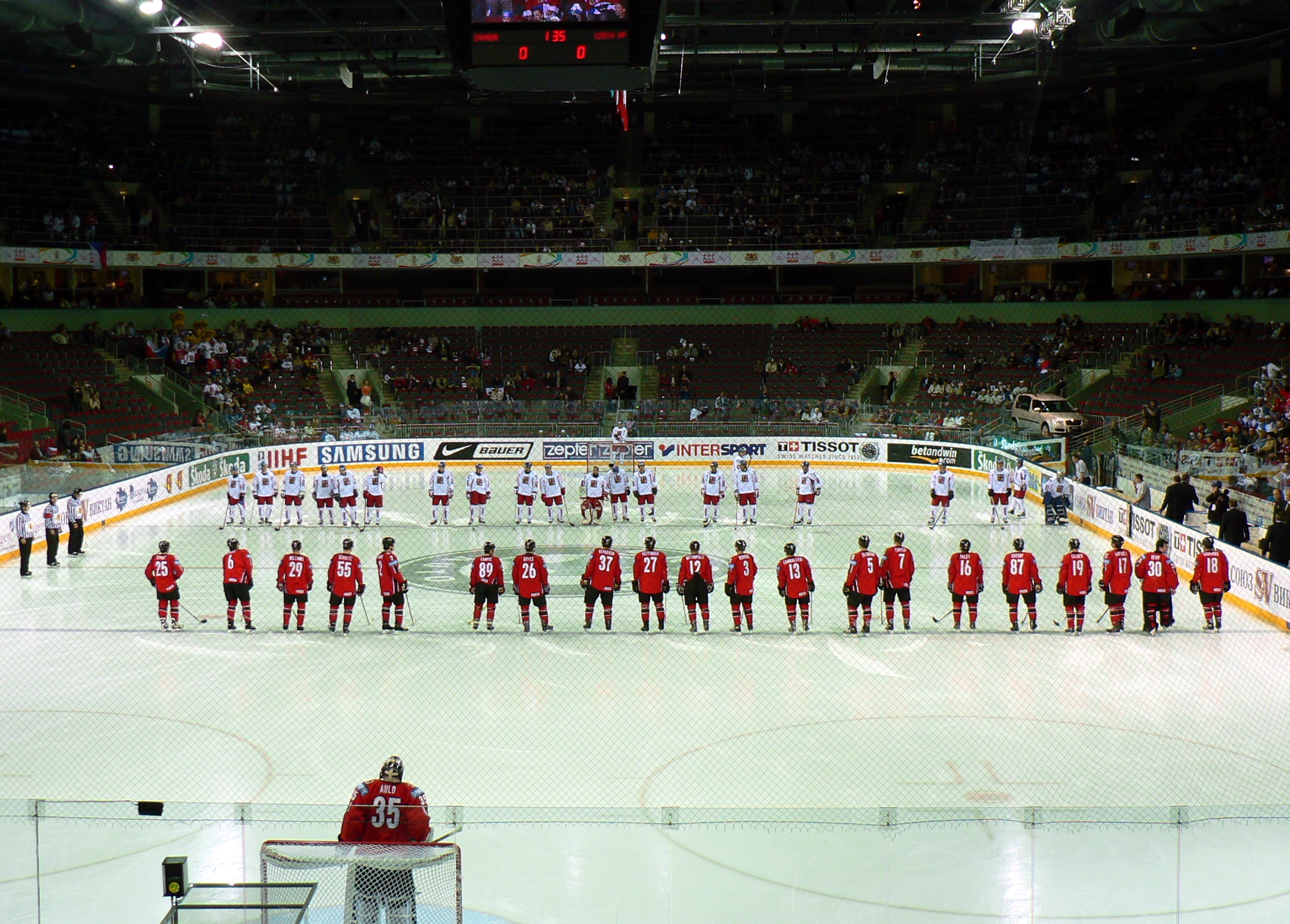
Czech Republic against Canada

Team	Pld	W	D	L	GF	GA	GD	Pts	Qualification
Canada	5	4	0	1	28	10	+18	8	Playoff round
Finland	5	3	1	1	17	7	+10	7	Playoff round
United States	5	3	0	2	11	10	+1	6	Playoff round
Czech Republic	5	2	2	1	14	12	+2	6	Playoff round
Latvia	5	1	1	3	7	23	−16	3	Eliminated
Norway	5	0	0	5	5	20	−15	0	Eliminated

Source: IIHF

All times local (UTC+3)

11 May 2006; 20:15	Canada	11–0 (4–0, 1–0, 6–0)	Latvia	Arena Riga; Attendance: 8389

Game reference

Marc Denis
Goalies
Sergejs Naumovs
Martins Raitums
Referee:
(United States) Rick Looker

5:41 - Williams (Stuart) (PP1)	1–0
8:49 - Crosby (Williams) (PP2)	2–0
14:40 - Boyes (Williams) (PP1)	3–0
17:43 - Bergeron (Boyes, Crosby) (PP1)	4–0
25:58 - Shanahan (Williams, Cammalleri) (PP1)	5–0
40:24 - Carter (Calder, Schultz)	6–0
41:18 - Pettinger (Daley, Metropolit) (PP2)	7–0
42:24 - Richards (Stuart, Carter) (PP1)	8–0
45:59 - Calder (PP1)	9–0
46:31 - Calder (Hamhuis, Richards)	10–0
50:17 - Hartnell (Metropolit) (PP1)	11–0

16 min
Penalties
32 min
40
Shots
26

12 May 2006; 16:15	Czech Republic	3–1 (0–1, 2–0, 1–0)	Norway	Arena Riga; Attendance: 7004

Game reference

Milan Hnilička
Goalies
Mathias Gundersen
Referee:
(Russia) Alexander Poliakov

	0–1	12:21 - Ask (Hansen) (PP1)
27:21 - Hlaváč (Škoula, Richter)	1–1
38:31 - Balaštík (Richter)	2–1
58:26 - Tenkrát (Hlinka)	3–1

10 min
Penalties
10 min
42
Shots
21

12 May 2006; 20:15	Finland	4–0 (1–0, 2–0, 1–0)	United States	Arena Riga; Attendance: 7379

Game reference

Antero Niittymäki
Goalies
Craig Anderson
Referee:
(Czech Republic) Milan Minar

11:13 - Koivu (Luoma, Jokinen)	1–0
26:01 - Bergenheim (Ruutu, Hahl)	2–0
32:44 - Nummelin (Koivu) (PP2)	3–0
54:27 - Kukkonen (Hahl)	4–0

14 min
Penalties
14 min
33
Shots
24

13 May 2006; 20:15	United States	4–2 (0–0, 2–1, 2–1)	Latvia	Arena Riga; Attendance: 9083

Game reference

Craig Anderson
Goalies
Sergejs Naumovs
Referee:
(Slovakia) Peter Jonak

20:59 - Malone (Cullen, Brown)	1–0
	1–1	22:12 - Dārziņš
34:19 - Brown (Kessel) (PP1)	2–1
	2–2	41:00 - Semjonovs (Daugaviņš) (PP1)
42:27 - Patrick O'Sullivan (Cullen) (PP1)	3–2
49:50 - Suter (PP1)	4–2

24 min
Penalties
22 min
27
Shots
24

14 May 2006; 16:15	Norway	0–3 (0–1, 0–1, 0–1)	Finland	Arena Riga; Attendance: 7345

Game reference

Mathias Gundersen
Goalies
Fredrik Norrena
Referee:
(Slovakia) Peter Jonak

0–1	9:35 - Hentunen (Pirnes, Kallio)
0–2	33:30 - Jokinen (Nummelin) (PP1)
0–3	55:58 - Pirnes (Hentunen, Kallio)

14 min
Penalties
12 min
18
Shots
40

14 May 2006; 20:15	Canada	4–6 (1–3, 2–1, 1–2)	Czech Republic	Arena Riga; Attendance: 7474

Game reference

Alex Auld
Goalies
Milan Hnilička
Referee:
(Germany) Richard Schuetz

	0–1	6:34 - Hubáček (Hlinka)
	0–2	8:06 - Výborný
	0–3	13:30 - Plekanec (Irgl)
15:44 - Robidas	1–3
21:51 - Richards (Calder)	2–3
31:26 - Hamhuis (Boyes, Crosby)	3–3
	3–4	35:04 - Irgl
41:01 - Crosby (Bergeron)	4–4
	4–5	46:29 - Balaštík (Škoula)
	4–6	53:39 - Erat (Výborný)

8 min
Penalties
10 min
31
Shots
40

15 May 2006; 20:15	Finland	2–4 (1–2, 0–1, 1–1)	Canada	Arena Riga; Attendance: 7171

Game reference

Antero Niittymäki
Fredrik Norrena
Goalies
Marc Denis
Referee:
(Sweden) Marcus Vinnerborg

	0–1	5:58 - Bergeron (Boyes, Crosby) (PP1)
	0–2	16:57 - Carter (SH1)
18:15 - Koivu (Saravo)	1–2
	1–3	26:33 - Carter (SH1)
50:46 - Nummelin (Luoma, Koivu) (PP1)	2–3
	2–4	51:36 - Boyes (Crosby, Bergeron)

24 min
Penalties
16 min
40
Shots
25

16 May 2006; 15:15	Czech Republic	1–3 (0–2, 1–0, 0–1)	United States	Arena Riga; Attendance: 7441

Game reference

Milan Hnilička
Goalies
Jason Bacashihua
Referee:
(Russia) Alexander Poliakov

	0–1	13:03 - Malone
	0–2	19:43 - Cullen (Park, Hilbert)
27:25 - Michálek (Erat, Výborný)	1–2
	1–3	47:25 - Brown (Malone)

6 min
Penalties
6 min
26
Shots
27

16 May 2006; 19:15	Latvia	4–2 (2–0, 1–1, 1–1)	Norway	Arena Riga; Attendance: 9173

Game reference

Sergejs Naumovs
Goalies
Mathias Gundersen
Referee:
(Czech Republic) Milan Minar

6:44 - Reķis (Cipulis) (PP1)	1–0
8:34 - Blinovs (Širokovs)	2–0
	2–1	30:58 - Skrøder (Vikingstad, Myrvold) (PP1)
36:02 - Dārziņš (Rēdlihs)	3–1
53:16 - Semjonovs (Tambijevs) (PP1)	4–1
	4–2	59:34 - Nygard (Jakobsen)

12 min
Penalties
18 min
25
Shots
18

=== Group F ===
Team	Pld	W	D	L	GF	GA	GD	Pts	Qualification
Russia	5	4	1	0	22	11	+11	9	Playoff round
Sweden	5	2	2	1	17	15	+2	6	Playoff round
Belarus	5	3	0	2	16	10	+6	6	Playoff round
Slovakia	5	2	1	2	19	10	+9	5	Playoff round
Switzerland	5	1	2	2	12	15	−3	4	Eliminated
Ukraine	5	0	0	5	4	29	−25	0	Eliminated

Source: IIHF

All times local (UTC +3)

11 May 2006; 16:15	Russia	6–0 (1–0, 0–0, 5–0)	Ukraine	Arena Riga; Attendance: 6963

Game reference

Sergei Zvyagin
Alexander Fomichev
Goalies
Igor Karpenko
Referee:
(Germany) Richard Schuetz

16:06 - Sushinski (Ovechkin, Kulyash) (PP1)	1–0
41:03 - Sushinski (Ovechkin, Malkin) (PP1)	2–0
46:06 - Ovechkin (Kruchinin, Sushinski)	3–0
48:19 - Kulyash (Nikulin) (PP2)	4–0
53:47 - Mozyakin (Misharin)	5–0
57:03 - Grigorenko (Mozyakin, Gorovikov) (PP1)	6–0

8 min
Penalties
41 min
50
Shots
25

12 May 2006; 16:15	Switzerland	2–2 (0–1, 0–1, 2–0)	Slovakia	Skonto Arena; Attendance: 2325

Game reference

David Aebischer
Goalies
Karol Križan
Referee:
(Canada) Chris Savage

	0–1	14:18 - Cibák
	0–2	31:33 - Milo (Pavlikovsky, Surový) (PP1)
49:50 - Reichert (Plüss) (PP1)	1–2
58:04 - Jeannin (Bezina)	2–2

37 min
Penalties
14 min
19
Shots
15

12 May 2006; 20:15	Sweden	4–1 (4–0, 0–0, 0–1)	Belarus	Skonto Arena; Attendance: 2209

Game reference

Johan Holmqvist
Goalies
Sergei Shabanov
Referee:
(Finland) Jari Levonen

4:16 - Nylander (Zetterberg, Johansson) (PP1)	1–0
7:18 - Nordquist (Timander, Jönsson)	2–0
16:40 - Johansson (Franzén)	3–0
18:58 - Hållberg (Samuelsson, Timander)	4–0
	4–1	49:14 - Zadelenov (Meleshko, Chupris)

24 min
Penalties
22 min
42
Shots
23

13 May 2006; 20:15	Belarus	9–1 (1–0, 3–1, 5–0)	Ukraine	Skonto Arena; Attendance: 2732

Game reference

Andrei Mezin
Goalies
Igor Karpenko
Referee:
(Germany) Richard Schuetz

10:36 - Grabovski (Skabelka) (PP1)	1–0
22:11 - Kostyuchenok (Grabovski, Kostitsyn) (PP1)	2–0
22:37 - Antonenko (Skabelka, Zadelenov)	3–0
35:47 - Grabovski (Kostitsyn, Zadelenov) (PP1)	4–0
	4–1	39:47 - Gunko (Bobrovnikov)
45:06 - Dudik (Skabelka)	5–1
46:17 - Skabelka (Antonenko) (PP2)	6–1
56:40 - Kopat (Zadelenov, Skabelka)	7–1
57:26 - Grabovski (Kostitsyn)	8–1
57:48 - Dudik (Mikhalev) (PP1)	9–1

14 min
Penalties
38 min
39
Shots
32

14 May 2006; 16:15	Russia	6–3 (1–0, 1–2, 4–1)	Switzerland	Skonto Arena; Attendance: 3729

Game reference

Sergey Zvyagin
Goalies
David Aebischer
Referee:
(Czech Republic) Milan Minar

13:55 - Zaripov (Kulemin, Sushinski)	1–0
22:26 - Arkhipov (Mikhnov, Semin)	2–0
	2–1	22:36 - Paterlini (Ambühl, Reichert)
	2–2	32:33 - Forster (Wirz, Déruns)
40:51 - Bykov (Zaripov, Sushinski) (PP1)	3–2
42:38 - Nikulin (Mikhnov, Arkhipov) (PP1)	4–2
	4–3	45:17 - Bezina (Streit, Blindenbacher) (PP2)
57:25 - Kulemin	5–3
59:45 - Malkin (Atyushov)	6–3

14 min
Penalties
14 min
31
Shots
25

14 May 2006; 20:15	Slovakia	5–2 (2–0, 2–2, 1–0)	Sweden	Skonto Arena; Attendance: 2882

Game reference

Karol Križan
Goalies
Daniel Henriksson
Referee:
(United States) David Hansen

1:45 - Marián Hossa (Pavlikovsky, Marcel Hossa)	1–0
8:57 - Cibák (Jurčina, Marián Hossa) (PP1)	2–0
21:57 - Vydarený (Čiernik, Milo) (PP1)	3–0
	3–1	22:20 - Johansson (Mattsson, Zetterberg)
	3–2	23:29 - Karlsson (Emvall, Mattson) (PP1)
26:22 - Marcel Hossa (Marián Hossa, Pavlikovsky) (PP1)	4–2
46:33 - Kollar (Milo) (SH1)	5–2

16 min
Penalties
14 min
21
Shots
36

15 May 2006; 20:15	Sweden	3–3 (1–2, 2–0, 0–1)	Russia	Skonto Arena; Attendance: 3983

Game reference

Johan Holmqvist
Goalies
Maxim Sokolov
Referee:
(Canada) Chris Savage

	0–1	1:22 - Ovechkin (Kulemin, Malkin)
7:33 - Samuelsson (K. Jönsson, Nylander) (PP1)	1–1
	1–2	11:28 - Mikhnov (Zhukov, Arkhipov) (PP1)
20:14 - Samuelsson (K. Jönsson) (PP1)	2–2
22:58 - J. Jönsson (Hållberg, Samuelsson)	3–2
	3–3	55:47 - Mikhnov (Semin, Khomitsky)

16 min
Penalties
18 min
29
Shots
24

16 May 2006; 15:15	Switzerland	1–2 (0–1, 0–1, 1–0)	Belarus	Skonto Arena; Attendance: 3170

Game reference

David Aebischer
Goalies
Andrei Mezin
Referee:
(United States) David Hansen

	0–1	9:04 - Skabelka (Grabovski)
	0–2	29:58 - Zadelenov (Skabelka, Meleshko)
48:17 - Plüss (Rüthemann)	1–2

10 min
Penalties
10 min
30
Shots
21

16 May 2006; 19:15	Ukraine	0–8 (0-1, 0-4, 0-3)	Slovakia	Skonto Arena; Attendance: 2982

Game reference

Igor Karpenko
Goalies
Karol Križan
Referee:
(Finland) Jari Levonen

0–1	12:52 - Kapuš (Čiernik, Bartovič)
0–2	21:36 - Milo (Marcel Hossa, Marián Hossa)
0–3	25:11 - Štrbák (Kapuš, Bartovič) (PP1)
0–4	35:46 - Kováčik (Kollar)
0–5	36:58 - Bartovič
0–6	44:25 - Kapuš (Bartovič)
0–7	49:19 - Hudec (Štrbák, Kollar) (PP1)
0–8	58:25 - Jurčina (Pavlikovsky) (PP1)

18 min
Penalties
8 min
10
Shots
37

== Relegation round ==
The relegation round is composed of the four teams that placed last in Groups A through D. They play in a round-robin fashion, and the bottom two teams get relegated to the Division I group in next year's World Championships.

=== Group G ===
Team	Pld	W	D	L	GF	GA	GD	Pts	Qualification or relegation
Denmark	3	2	1	0	11	5	+6	5	Qualified for the 2007 IIHF World Championship
Italy	3	1	1	1	6	10	−4	3	Qualified for the 2007 IIHF World Championship
Kazakhstan	3	1	0	2	9	6	+3	2	Relegated to Division I
Slovenia	3	0	2	1	6	11	−5	2	Relegated to Division I

Source: IIHF

All times local (UTC +3)

May 12, 2006; 12:15	Slovenia	3–3 (0–2, 1–1, 2–0)	Denmark	Arena Riga; Attendance: 7666

Game reference

Robert Kristan
Goalies
Peter Hirsch
Referee:
(United States) David Hansen

	0–1	1:38 - Dahlmann (Nielsen, Kjaergaard) (PP1)
	0–2	8:43 - Staal (Green, Damgaard) (PP1)
24:50 - Razingar (Kopitar) (PP1)	1–2
	1–3	25:12 - Staal
40:23 - Kranjc (Rodman) (PP1)	2–3
57:59 - Sotlar (Kopitar, Kranjc)	3–3

10 min
Penalties
8 min
24
Shots
32

May 12, 2006; 12:15	Italy	3–2 (1–0, 0–2, 2–0)	Kazakhstan	Skonto Arena; Attendance: 3,193

Game reference

Jason Muzzatti
Goalies
Sergey Ogureshnikov
Referee:
(Sweden) Marcus Vinnerborg

5:30 - G. Busillo (C. Borgatello, J. Cirone) (PP1)	1–0
	1–1	28:24 - A. Samokhvalov (A. Litvinenko) (PP1)
	1–2	33:35 - T. Zhailauov (A. Koreshkov, A. Argokov) (PP1)
44:55 - G. Busillo (A. Helfer)	2–2
50:16 - A. Helfer (G. Busillo) (PP1)	3–2

14 min
Penalties
26 min
25
Shots
37

May 13, 2006; 16:15	Kazakhstan	5–0 (2–0, 3–0, 0–0)	Slovenia	Arena Riga; Attendance: 7,563

Game reference

Sergey Ogureshnikov
Goalies
Robert Kristan
Referee:
(Canada) Brent Reiber

6:09 - R. Starchenko (M. Belyayev)	1–0
7:48 - A. Pchelyakov (K. Shafranov)	2–0
27:10 - A. Litvinenko (A. Pchelyakov, Y. Blokhin) (PP1)	3–0
29:56 - R. Starchenko (A. Trockshinskiy, M. Belyayev)	4–0
32:11 - V. Krasnoslabotsev (N. Zarzhitskiy, A. Spiridonov)	5–0

22 min
Penalties
35 min
25
Shots
31

May 13, 2006; 16:15	Italy	0–5 (0–1, 0–1, 0–3)	Denmark	Skonto Arena; Attendance: 2,640

Game reference

Jason Muzzatti
Goalies
Peter Hirsch
Referee:
(United States) Rick Looker

0–1	4:16 - M. Bødker
0–2	37:19 - K. Staal (D. Nielsen, M. Green) (PP1)
0–3	49:46 - F. Nielsen
0–4	55:23 - F. Nielsen (K. Staal) (PP1)
0–5	59:50 - J. Damgaard (J. Nielsen) (PP2)

69 min
Penalties
12 min
15
Shots
39

May 15, 2006; 16:15	Slovenia	3–3 (1–0, 2–1, 0–2)	Italy	Arena Riga; Attendance: 6,574

Game reference

Robert Kristan
Goalies
Jason Muzzatti
Thomas Tragust
Referee:
(Canada) Brent Reiber

5:01 - A. Kranjc (M. Rodman, T. Razingar) (PP1)	1–0
22:03 - A. Kopitar (A. Kranjc)	2–0
25:25 - D. Kontrec (A. Kopitar)	3–0
	3–1	27:26 - L. Ansoldi (S. Margoni, J. Parco)
	3–2	44:35 - L. Ansoldi
	3–3	58:21 - M. Strazzabosco (G. de Bettin, G. Busillo)

10 min
Penalties
10 min
31
Shots
30

May 15, 2006; 16:15	Denmark	3–2 (1–0, 1–1, 1–1)	Kazakhstan	Skonto Arena; Attendance: 2,903

Game reference

Peter Hirsch
Goalies
Sergey Ogureshnikov
Referee:
(Finland) Jari Levonen

13:27 - C. Kjærgaard (PP1)	1–0
34:17 - J. Hansen (J. Damgaard)	2–0
	2–1	36:46 - Y. Pupkov (A. Spiridonov) (PP1)
57:26 - J. Damgaard (M. Green, J. Nielsen) (PP2)	3–1
	3–2	59:40 - A. Argokov (Y. Koreshkov)

12 min
Penalties
14 min
27
Shots
24

== Playoff round ==
=== Bracket ===
Quarterfinals
F1	Russia	3
E4	Czech Republic	4
E2	Finland	3
F3	Belarus	0
E1	Canada	4
F4	Slovakia	1
F2	Sweden	6
E3	United States	0

Semifinals
QF1	Czech Republic	3
QF2	Finland	1
QF4	Canada	4
QF3	Sweden	5

Finals
SF1	Czech Republic	0
SF2	Sweden	4
Bronze medal game
SF2	Canada	0
SF1	Finland	5

=== Quarter-finals ===
17 May 2006; 15:15	Sweden	6–0 (2–0, 2–0, 2–0)	United States	Arena Riga; Attendance: 2,800

Game reference

Johan Holmqvist
Goalies
Craig Anderson
Jason Bacashihua
Referee:
(Canada) Brent Reiber

2:48 - M. Hannula (R. Sundin)	1–0
15:40 - M. Hannula (N. Kronwall, K. Jönsson)	2–0
25:51 - M. Samuelsson (M. Nylander)	3–0
35:34 - K. Jönsson (M. Nylander, M. Samuelsson) (PP1)	4–0
48:41 - M. Hannula (J. Nordquist)	5–0
58:36 - A. Karlsson (T. Mårtensson, N. Kronwall) (PP1)	6–0

10 min
Penalties
14 min
33
Shots
18

17 May 2006; 19:15	Canada	4–1 (0–1, 1–0, 3–0)	Slovakia	Arena Riga; Attendance: 7,129

Game reference

Marc Denis
Goalies
Karol Križan
Referee:
(Russia) Alexander Poliakov

	0–1	17:36 - D. Milo (Mari. Hossa)
34:35 - M. Cammalleri (B. Shanahan)	1–1
52:53 - P. Bergeron (D. Hamhuis)	2–1
54:23 - S. Crosby (P. Bergeron)	3–1
54:32 - J. Carter	4–1

4 min
Penalties
10 min
42
Shots
23

18 May 2006; 16:15	Russia	3–4 (OT) (1–0, 0–1, 2–2, 0–1)	Czech Republic	Arena Riga; Attendance: 8,082

Game reference

Maxim Sokolov
Goalies
Milan Hnilička
Referee:
(Sweden) Marcus Vinnerborg

2:30 - A. Ovechkin (E. Malkin, N. Kulemin)	1–0
	1–1	25:45 - T. Kaberle (D. Výborný, M. Erat) (PP1)
	1–2	43:39 - J. Hlinka (PP1)
45:10 - S. Mozyakin (K. Gorovikov)	2–2
	2–3	47:06 - P. Štefan (J. Hlinka, T. Kaberle) (PP1)
58:55 - A. Mikhnov (V. Atyushov, A. Ovechkin)	3–3
	3–4	67:58 - Z. Irgl (D. Výborný)

18 min
Penalties
16 min
34
Shots
36

18 May 2006; 20:15	Finland	3–0 (1–0, 0–0, 2–0)	Belarus	Arena Riga; Attendance: 7,164

Game reference

Fredrik Norrena
Goalies
Andrei Mezin
Referee:
(Canada) Chris Savage

9:24 - R. Hahl (J. Ruutu, S. Bergenheim)	1–0
43:58 - V. Peltonen (P. Nummelin, O. Jokinen)	2–0
54:48 - O. Jokinen (V. Peltonen, P. Nummelin) (PP2)	3–0

14 min
Penalties
10 min
41
Shots
20

=== Semi-finals ===
20 May 2006; 16:15	Finland	1–3 (1–0, 0–1, 0–2)	Czech Republic	Arena Riga; Attendance: 8,763

Game reference

Fredrik Norrena
Goalies
Milan Hnilička
Referee:
(Germany) Richard Schuetz

8:03 - R. Hahl (J. Ruutu, P. Nummelin)	1–0
	1–1	28:26 - T. Plekanec (Z. Irgl) (SH1)
	1–2	56:17 - D. Výborný (T. Kaberle) (PP1)
	1–3	59:14 - J. Hlinka (EN)

45 min
Penalties
37 min
34
Shots
21

20 May 2006; 20:15	Canada	4–5 (2–3, 1–2, 1–0)	Sweden	Arena Riga; Attendance: 8,845

Game reference

Marc Denis
Alex Auld
Goalies
Johan Holmqvist
Referee:
(Czech Republic) Milan Minář

	0–1	1:27 - N. Kronwall (M. Nylander)
	0–2	4:11 - J. Jönsson (M. Samuelsson, M. Nylander) (PP1)
8:11 - K. Calder (M. Richards)	1–2
	1–3	11:52 - T. Mårtensson (M. Timander)
16:38 - M. Comrie (M. Cammalleri) (PP1)	2–3
	2–4	21:33 - M. Samuelsson (P. Hallberg, M. Nylander)
	2–5	22:41 - J. Nordquist (M. Hannula)
39:25 - S. Crosby	3–5
43:38 - P. Bergeron (S. Crosby, J. Williams) (PP1)	4–5

18 min
Penalties
39 min
32
Shots
25

=== Bronze medal game ===
21 May 2006; 16:15	Canada	0–5 (0–1, 0–2, 0–2)	Finland	Arena Riga; Attendance: 9,365

Game reference

Alex Auld
Goalies
Fredrik Norrena
Referee:
(Slovakia) Peter Jonak

0–1	4:06 - T. Kallio (E. Pirnes, A. Miettinen) (PP1)
0–2	25:20 - O. Jokinen (P. Nummelin, M. Lehtonen) (PP2)
0–3	36:18 - R. Hahl
0–4	42:55 - A. Miettinen (P. Nummelin)
0–5	53:56 - J. Jokinen (P. Nummelin, V. Peltonen) (PP2)

32 min
Penalties
34 min
37
Shots
33

=== Gold medal game ===
21 May 2006; 20:15	Sweden	4–0 (2–0, 2–0, 0–0)	Czech Republic	Arena Riga; Attendance: 9,800

Game reference

Johan Holmqvist
Goalies
Milan Hnilička
Referee:
(Germany) Richard Schuetz

14:36 - J. Mattsson (N. Kronwall, A. Karlsson)	1–0
15:13 - F. Emvall (J. Mattsson, A. Karlsson)	2–0
24:07 - N. Kronwall (R. Sundin, M. Nylander)	3–0
37:01 - J. Jönsson (M. Samuelsson, M. Nylander) (PP2)	4–0

10 min
Penalties
10 min
26
Shots
15

== Ranking and statistics ==
2006 IIHF World Championship winners

Sweden
8th title

=== Tournament Awards ===
- Best players selected by the directorate:
  - Best Goaltender: (Sweden) Johan Holmqvist
  - Best Defenceman: (Sweden) Niklas Kronwall
  - Best Forward: (Canada) Sidney Crosby
  - Most Valuable Player: (Sweden) Niklas Kronwall
- Media All-Star Team:
  - Goaltender: (Belarus) Andrei Mezin
  - Defence: (Sweden) Niklas Kronwall, (Finland) Petteri Nummelin
  - Forward: (Canada) Sidney Crosby, (Russia) Alexander Ovechkin, (Czech Republic) David Výborný

=== Final standings ===
The final standings of the tournament according to IIHF:

1st place, gold medalist(s)	Sweden
2nd place, silver medalist(s)	Czech Republic
3rd place, bronze medalist(s)	Finland
4	Canada
5	Russia
6	Belarus
7	United States
8	Slovakia
9	Switzerland
10	Latvia
11	Norway
12	Ukraine
13	Denmark
14	Italy
15	Kazakhstan
16	Slovenia

=== Scoring leaders ===
List shows the top skaters sorted by points, then goals. If the list exceeds 10 skaters because of a tie in points, all of the tied skaters are left out.

Player	GP	G	A	Pts	+/−	PIM	POS
(Canada) Sidney Crosby	9	8	8	16	+7	10	F
(Canada) Patrice Bergeron	9	6	8	14	+5	2	F
(Finland) Petteri Nummelin	9	3	11	14	-1	2	D
(Sweden) Niklas Kronwall	8	2	8	10	+3	10	D
(Russia) Alexander Ovechkin	7	6	3	9	+6	6	F
(Belarus) Mikhail Grabovski	7	5	4	9	+2	2	F
(Sweden) Andreas Karlsson	9	5	4	9	0	6	F
(Sweden) Mikael Samuelsson	8	4	5	9	+7	4	F
(Slovenia) Anže Kopitar	6	3	6	9	-2	2	F
(Russia) Evgeni Malkin	7	3	6	9	+7	6	F

Source: IIHF.com

=== Leading goaltenders ===
Only the top five goaltenders, based on save percentage, who have played 40% of their team's minutes are included in this list.

Player	MIP	SOG	GA	GAA	SVS%	SO
(Finland) Fredrik Norrena	325:43	122	6	1.11	95.08	3
(Belarus) Andrei Mezin	417:01	239	14	2.01	94.14	0
(Slovakia) Karol Križan	379:41	142	12	1.90	91.55	3
(Russia) Sergey Zvyagin	278:32	105	9	1.94	91.43	1
(Canada) Marc Denis	262:41	123	11	2.51	91.06	1

Source: IIHF.com

== IIHF broadcasting rights ==
- Austria
  - Austrian Matches: ORF
  - Other Matches: ORF Sport Plus
- Canada
  - English: TSN
  - French: RDS
- Czech Republic: Czech Television (ČT2, ČT4 Sport)
- Denmark: TV2 Sport
- Finland: YLE
- France: Sport+
- Germany
  - German Matches: ARD, ZDF
  - Other Matches: DSF
- Latvia: TV3, 3+ Latvia
- Norway
  - Norwegian Matches: NRK
  - Other Matches: Viasat SportN, Viasat Sport 3
- Russia: RTR Sport
- Slovakia: STV
- Slovenia: RTV Slovenija
- Sweden: Viasat
- Switzerland
  - German: SF zwei
  - French: TSR 2
  - Italian: TSI 2
- Ukraine: Megasport

== IIHF honors and awards ==
The 2006 IIHF Hall of Fame induction ceremony has held in Riga during the World Championships. Bo Tovland of Sweden was given the Paul Loicq Award for outstanding contributions to international ice hockey.

IIHF Hall of Fame inductees

- Henryk Gruth, Poland
- Anatoli Khorozov, Ukraine
- Kent Nilsson, Sweden
- Vladimir Petrov, Russia
- Shoichi Tomita, Japan
- Juhani Wahlsten, Finland

== See also ==
- 2006 in ice hockey
- 2006 IIHF World U18 Championships
- 2006 World Junior Ice Hockey Championships
