= 2006 IIHF World Championship final =

Ice hockey match

	1	2	3	Total
Czech Republic	0	0	0	0
Sweden	2	2	0	4
- Date: May 21, 2006
- Arena: Arena Riga
- City: Riga
- Attendance: 9,800

The 2006 IIHF World Championship final was an ice hockey match that took place on 21 May 2006 at the Arena Riga in Riga, Latvia, to determine the winner of the 2006 IIHF World Championship. Sweden defeated the Czech Republic 4–0 to win its 8th championship. It is the only time the Czechs have lost the gold medal game in tournament history.

== Background ==
The game marked the first time that Sweden and the Czech Republic would meet in the World Championship finals. The Czech Republic were finalists for the second time in as many years, and they were defending champions having beaten Canada to win the 2004 edition. However, Sweden were just coming off a gold medal winning performance at the 2006 Olympics. This was seen as either a curse or good-luck, on the one hand, no team had ever won Olympic and World Championship gold in the same year, on the other it showed the strength of the Swedish team.

== Venue ==
The Arena Riga in Riga was determined to host the final of the championship. Previously at the tournament, the venue hosted both the semi-finals, and also the Bronze medal match. In the final, the attendance was 9,800.

== The Match ==
=== Summary ===
Jesper Mattsson opened the scoring for Sweden at 14:36 minutes into the first period, assisted by Niklas Kronwall, and Andreas Karlsson. This ended up being the game-winning goal. Just 37 seconds later Fredrik Emvall put one in five-hole on Milan Hnilička, assisted by Karlsson, and Mattson.

At 4:07 into the second period, Kronwall received a pass from Ronnie Sundin, off of Michael Nylander and rushed down the right wing, cut into the slot and put it backhand on Hnilička. With only minutes remaining in the second period Jörgen Jönsson fired a successful one-timer shot from a pass by Mikael Samuelsson.

The Czechs were lacking offense and only managed 15 shots the entire game including only 4 in the second period. The Swedes dominated all three zones, and Johan Holmqvist, the Swedish goaltender came away with only the second ever shutout in a single game World Championship final.

The Swedish coach, Bengt-Åke Gustafsson, said of his team's historic win: "Most people believed it was impossible. To win an Olympics by itself is an achievement that was something special. But coming here with a new team, new guys, is special as well."

=== Details ===
May 21, 2006; 20:15	Sweden	4 – 0 (2–0, 2–0, 0–0)	Czech Republic	Arena Riga; Attendance: 9800

Game reference

Johan Holmqvist
Goalies
Milan Hnilička
Referee:
(Germany) Richard Schuetz

14:36 - Mattson (Kronwall, Karlsson)	1 – 0
15:13 - Emvall (Mattsson, Karlsson)	2 – 0
24:07 - Kronwall (Sundin, Nylander)	3 – 0
37:01 - Jönsson (Samuelsson, Nylander) (PP2)	4 – 0

10 min
Penalties
10 min
26
Shots
15

== See also ==
- 2006 IIHF World Championship
- Sweden men's national ice hockey team
- Czech Republic national ice hockey team
