= Andrej Kollár =

Andrej Kollár may refer to:

- Andrej Kollár (ice hockey, born 1977)
- Andrej Kollár (ice hockey, born 1999)
