= Khomitsky =

Khomitsky (Russian: Хомицкий) is a Slavic masculine surname; its feminine counterpart is Khomitskaya (Russian: Хомицкая). It may refer to:

- Sergey Khomitsky (born 1974), Belarusian boxer
- Vadim Khomitsky (born 1982), Russian ice hockey defenceman
