= Jaroslav Balaštík =

Czech ice hockey player (born 1979)

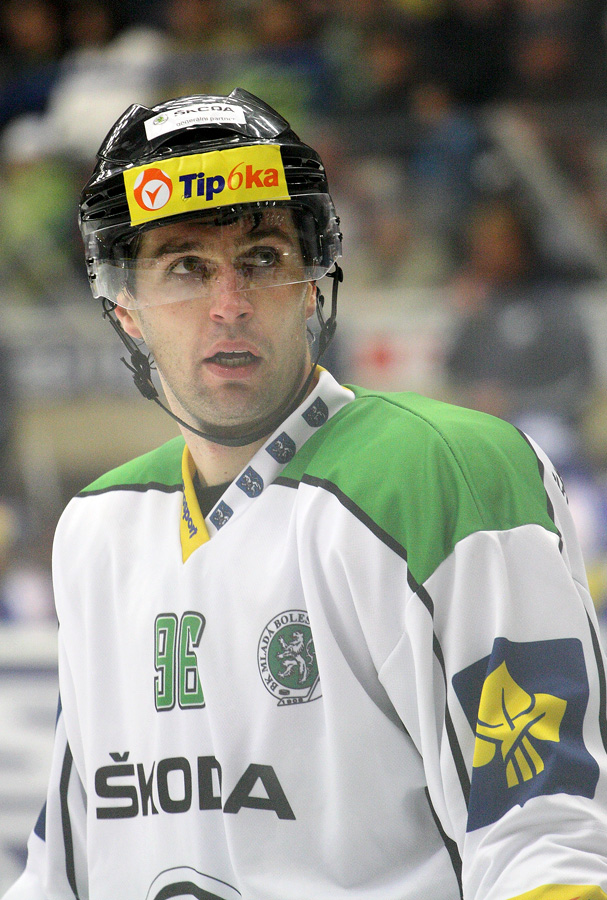
- Balaštík with BK Mladá Boleslav in 2011
- Born: November 28, 1979 (age 46) Uherské Hradiště, Czechoslovakia
- Height: 6 ft 3 in (191 cm)
- Weight: 205 lb (93 kg; 14 st 9 lb)
- Position: Right wing
- Shot: Left
- Played for: HC Zlín; HPK; Columbus Blue Jackets; HV71; BK Mlada Boleslav; HC Bílí Tygři Liberec
- National team: Czech Republic
- NHL draft: 184th overall, 2002; Columbus Blue Jackets
- Playing career: 1998–2015

Jaroslav Balaštík (born November 28, 1979) is a Czech former professional ice hockey player who most notably played with HC Zlin in the Czech Extraliga and the Columbus Blue Jackets in the National Hockey League (NHL).

== Playing career ==
Coming through the Czech professional hockey ranks Balaštík was drafted as an overage player in the 6th round, 184th overall in the 2002 NHL entry draft. After playing eight seasons (1997–2005) with HC Zlín in the Czech Extraliga, and part of one season (2002–03) with HPK in the Finnish SM-liiga; Balaštík started 2005 season with the Syracuse Crunch, the Blue Jackets' American Hockey League affiliate. He was quickly promoted to the big club, where he became somewhat of a shootout-specialist, going 6-for-9 for the season.

In his second season with the Blue Jackets and limited opportunity, on December 13, 2006, Balaštík was released and contracted by the Swedish Jönköping-based club HV71 in the Swedish elite league Elitserien. In HV71, Balaštík played with his fellow countryman Jan Hrdina, with whom he has played previously in Columbus Blue Jackets in NHL.

From 2007 to 2008 he rejoined HC Zlin in the Czech Republic and played 5 of the past 6 seasons with the team, defecting to BK Mlada Boleslav for a single season in 2011–12. He closed out his career after three more seasons with the club, before moving to HC Bílí Tygři Liberec.

== Career statistics ==
=== Regular season and playoffs ===
			Regular season					Playoffs
Season	Team	League	GP	G	A	Pts	PIM	GP	G	A	Pts	PIM
1995–96	AC ZPS Zlín	CZE U18
1996–97	AC ZPS Zlín	CZE U18	45	27	24	51		—	—	—	—	—
1997–98	HC ZPS–Barum Zlín	CZE U20	36	21	35	56		7	2	3	5
1997–98	HC ZPS–Barum Zlín	ELH	5	0	2	2	0	—	—	—	—	—
1997–98	HC Uherské Hradiště	CZE.3	23	4	5	9		—	—	—	—	—
1998–99	HC ZPS–Barum Zlín	ELH	41	4	8	12	10	9	1	0	1	27
1998–99	HC Kometa Brno	CZE.2	10	3	4	7	6	—	—	—	—	—
1998–99	HC ZPS–Barum Zlín	CZE U20	—	—	—	—	—	2	0	0	0
1999–2000	HC Barum Continental Zlín	CZE U20	4	5	5	10	2	—	—	—	—	—
1999–2000	HC Barum Continental Zlín	ELH	48	7	10	17	18	4	0	1	1	2
2000–01	HC Barum Continental Zlín	ELH	52	8	17	25	32	6	1	1	2	6
2001–02	HC Continental Zlín	ELH	50	25	19	44	32	11	3	5	8	14
2002–03	HC Hamé Zlín	ELH	31	14	8	22	26	—	—	—	—	—
2002–03	HPK	SM-liiga	13	5	7	12	2	13	4	3	7	6
2003–04	HC Hamé Zlín	ELH	51	29	18	47	54	17	9	9	18	32
2004–05	HC Hamé Zlín	ELH	52	30	16	46	74	17	4	9	13	52
2005–06	Columbus Blue Jackets	NHL	66	12	10	22	26	—	—	—	—	—
2005–06	Syracuse Crunch	AHL	14	3	3	6	6	—	—	—	—	—
2006–07	Columbus Blue Jackets	NHL	8	1	1	2	4	—	—	—	—	—
2006–07	Syracuse Crunch	AHL	6	2	3	5	6	—	—	—	—	—
2006–07	HV71	SEL	25	3	10	13	4	14	5	2	7	34
2007–08	RI Okna Zlín	ELH	52	29	11	40	72	—	—	—	—	—
2008–09	RI Okna Zlín	ELH	52	20	16	36	72	5	0	0	0	26
2009–10	PSG Zlín	ELH	45	21	21	42	32	6	8	5	13	8
2010–11	PSG Zlín	ELH	52	22	13	35	34	4	2	1	3	4
2011–12	BK Mladá Boleslav	ELH	52	17	16	33	38	—	—	—	—	—
2012–13	PSG Zlín	ELH	52	26	13	39	28	19	4	4	8	4
2013–14	PSG Zlín	ELH	52	20	11	31	34	17	4	5	9	14
2014–15	PSG Zlín	ELH	14	3	2	5	6	—	—	—	—	—
2014–15	Bílí Tygři Liberec	ELH	23	2	1	3	10	—	—	—	—	—
ELH totals			724	277	202	479	572	115	36	40	76	189
NHL totals			74	13	11	24	30	—	—	—	—	—

Medal record

Representing Czech Republic

Ice hockey

World Championships
Silver medal – second place	2006 Latvia	

=== International ===
Year	Team	Event	Result	GP	G	A	Pts	PIM
1997	Czech Republic	EJC	5th	6	1	2	3	0
1999	Czech Republic	WJC	7th	6	2	3	5	0
2003	Czech Republic	WC	4th	8	1	0	1	2
2006	Czech Republic	WC	2nd place, silver medalist(s)	9	4	2	6	2
2007	Czech Republic	WC	7th	6	0	0	0	4
Junior totals				12	3	5	8	0
Senior totals				23	5	2	7	8

== Awards ==
- Named Best Forward in Czech Extraliga in 2004–05.

== Records ==
- Most goals scored in Czech Extraliga in seasons 2003–04 and 2004–05.
- Most points in Czech Extraliga playoffs in season 2003–04.
- Most goals scored in Czech Extraliga playoffs in season 2003–04.
