= Per Hållberg =

Swedish ice hockey player

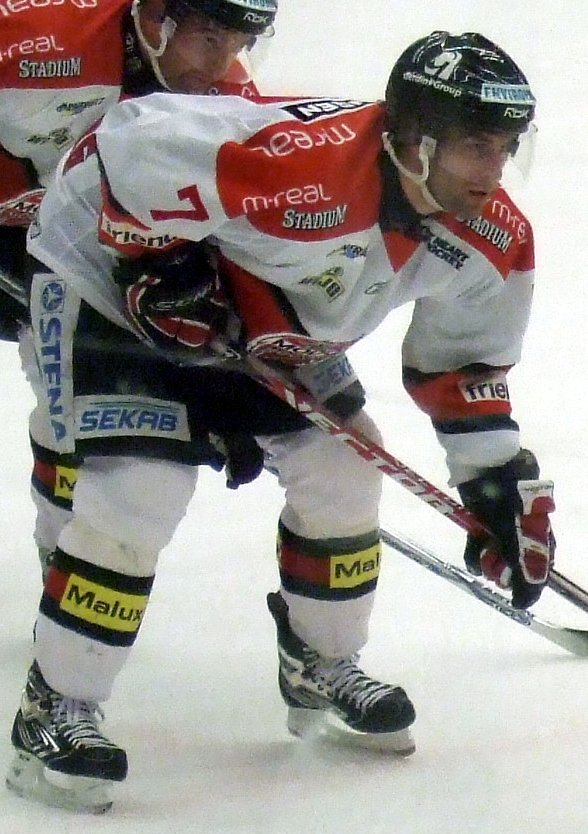
- Born: March 24, 1978 (age 47); Örnsköldsvik, SWE
- Height: 5 ft 10 in (178 cm)
- Weight: 182 lb (83 kg; 13 st 0 lb)
- Position: Defence
- Shoots: Left
- SEL team Former teams: Växjö Lakers Hockey; Färjestads BK; Modo Hockey
- Playing career: 1996–present

Medal record

Representing Sweden

World Championships
Gold medal – first place	2006 Riga	
Silver medal – second place	2004 Prague	

Per Hållberg (born March 24, 1978, in Örnsköldsvik, Sweden) is a Swedish professional ice hockey player currently playing for Växjö Lakers Hockey of the Elitserien (SEL). Hållberg has played over 500 games in the Elitserien. He has won both the Swedish Championship and the World Championship one time each.

== Playing career ==
Hållberg started his career with his hometown club, Modo Hockey, as a child and made his debut in Elitserien for Modo in 1994–95 at the age of 17. He played a few games in 1994–95 and 1995–96, but in 1996–97 he became a regular.

In 1999 Hållberg played his first Swedish Championship final, but Modo lost to Brynäs IF. The following season Modo came to the finals once again, but lost again, this time to Djurgårdens IF. Two years later Modo once more came to the finals, but once again they lost, Färjestads BK won with 3–0 in a best-of-five series. Now Hållberg was tired of silver and seconds places and he decide to change club. He therefore signed with Färjestad, the same club that had defeated him a few months earlier. With no better luck than before, Färjestad made it to the finals but lost three consecutive finals, twice (2003 and 2005) to Frölunda HC and once (2004) against HV71.

In 2004 Hållberg represented Sweden in the World Championship. Sweden lost in the finals to Canada.

During the 2005–06 season Hållberg announced that he would leave Färjestad after the season and that he had signed with the Swiss club EV Zug. That meant that this was maybe his last chance to win the Swedish Championship. And finally Hållberg got his gold when Färjestad defeated Frölunda HC with 4–2 in best-of-seven series. The same season Hållberg also played with the Swedish national team, and there also he won a gold medal at the World Championship.

Hållberg then went over to Modo Hockey in 2007 to play there for four seasons. On June 1, 2011, Hållberg signed a one-year contract with Växjö Lakers Hockey of the Elitserien (SEL).

== Achievements ==
- Silver medal at the World Championship in 2004.
- Swedish Champion with Färjestads BK in 2006.
- Gold medal at the World Championship in 2006.

== Career statistics ==
			Regular season					Playoffs
Season	Team	League	GP	G	A	Pts	PIM	GP	G	A	Pts	PIM
1994–95	Modo Hockey	SEL	2	0	1	1	0	—	—	—	—	—
1995–96	Modo Hockey	SEL	1	0	0	0	2	—	—	—	—	—
1996–97	Modo Hockey	SEL	37	2	4	6	16	—	—	—	—	—
1997–98	Modo Hockey	SEL	46	4	3	7	32	9	0	0	0	6
1998–99	Modo Hockey	SEL	50	2	12	14	36	13	2	3	5	12
1999–00	Modo Hockey	SEL	41	1	5	6	38	13	2	1	3	8
2000–01	Modo Hockey	SEL	40	3	8	11	38	7	1	4	5	4
2001–02	Modo Hockey	SEL	45	1	9	10	32	13	2	1	3	6
2002–03	Färjestads BK	SEL	47	4	11	15	63	12	1	3	4	22
2003–04	Färjestads BK	SEL	48	8	9	17	30	17	2	2	4	12
2004–05	Färjestads BK	SEL	32	3	5	8	26	0	0	0	0	0
2005–06	Färjestads BK	SEL	48	3	7	10	56	18	1	7	8	20
2006–07	EV Zug	NLA	32	3	13	16	30	9	1	5	6	18
2007–08	Modo Hockey	SEL	40	2	15	17	48	2	0	2	2	0
2008–09	Modo Hockey	SEL	45	2	6	8	34	—	—	—	—	—
SEL totals			522	35	95	130	451	104	11	23	34	90
NLA totals			32	3	13	16	30	9	1	5	6	18
