= Jonas Nordquist =

Swedish ice hockey player (born 1982)

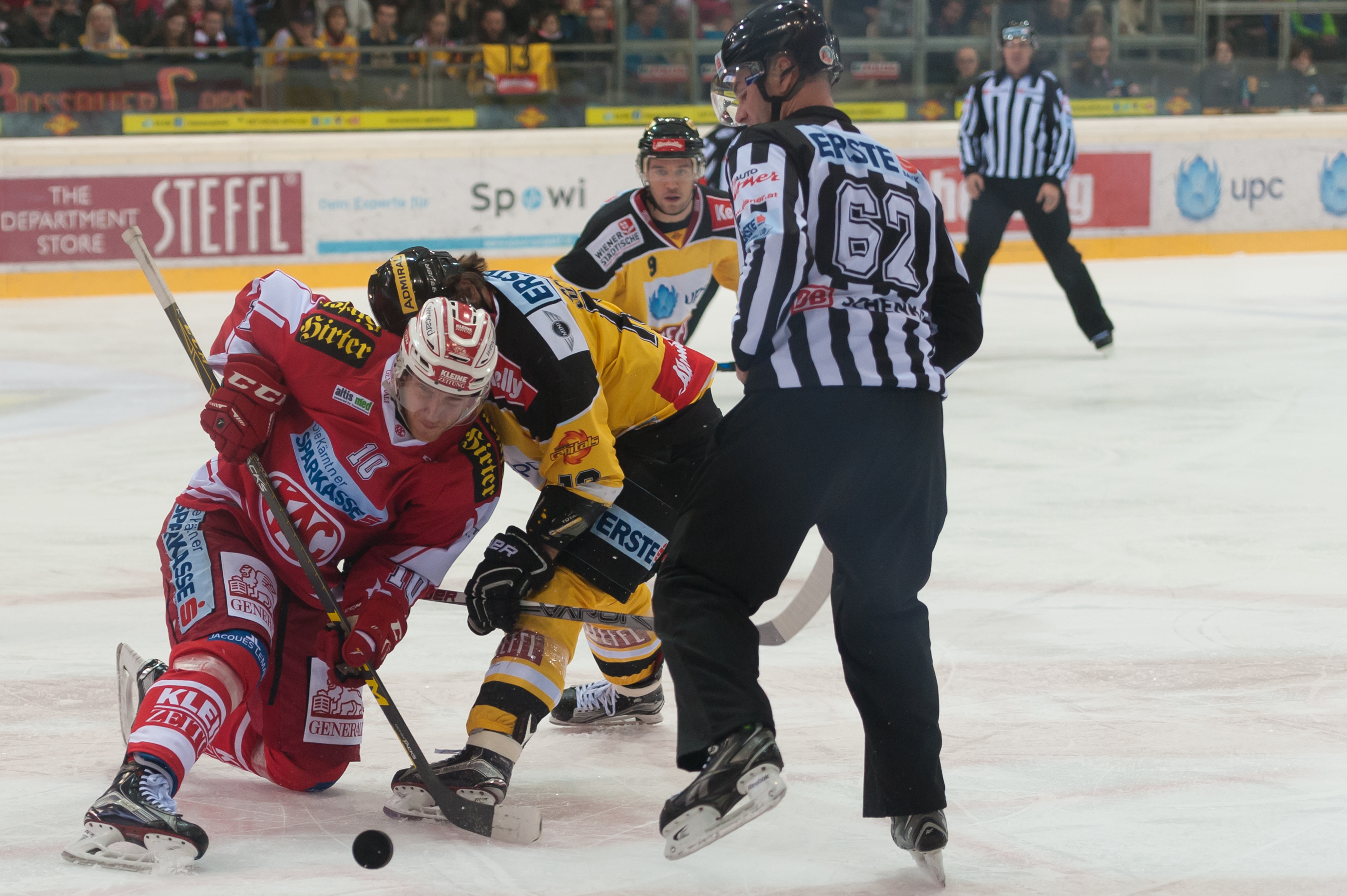
- Born: 26 April 1982 (age 44) Leksand, Sweden
- Height: 6 ft 3 in (191 cm)
- Weight: 202 lb (92 kg; 14 st 6 lb)
- Position: Centre
- Shot: Left
- Played for: Leksands IF; Luleå HF; Chicago Blackhawks; Frölunda HC; Brynäs IF; EC KAC
- National team: Sweden
- NHL draft: 49th overall, 2000; Chicago Blackhawks
- Playing career: 1999–2016

Jonas Martin Nordquist (born 26 April 1982) is a Swedish former professional ice hockey centre, who last played for EC KAC in Austrian Hockey League (EBEL). Nordquist was drafted by the Chicago Blackhawks in the 2nd round of the 2000 NHL entry draft (49th overall). He played in three games in the 2006-07 season with the Blackhawks, recording 2 assists.

== Playing career ==
He has predominantly played in his native Sweden, appearing in over 500 games with Leksands IF, Luleå HF, Frölunda HC and Brynäs IF in the Swedish Hockey League before signing an optional two-year contract in Austria, with EC KAC of the EBEL on 13 April 2015.

After one season in Klagenfurt, helping the club with 19 points in 46 games, Nordstrom's tenure with the club was ended after it exercising an opt-out clause on 23 March 2016.

In 2017 Nordquist ended his career as a player.

== Career statistics ==
=== Regular season and playoffs ===
			Regular season					Playoffs
Season	Team	League	GP	G	A	Pts	PIM	GP	G	A	Pts	PIM
1998–99	Leksands IF	J20	32	14	25	39		—	—	—	—	—
1999–2000	Leksands IF	J18 Allsv	1	0	2	2	0	5	3	5	8	0
1999–2000	Leksands IF	J20	36	15	24	39	32	2	0	0	0	2
1999–2000	Leksands IF	SEL	3	0	0	0	0	—	—	—	—	—
2000–01	Leksands IF	J20	10	6	13	19	6	5	1	6	7	2
2000–01	Leksands IF	SEL	35	2	2	4	4	—	—	—	—	—
2001–02	Leksands IF	J20	5	4	6	10	2	4	10	2	12	4
2001–02	Leksands IF	Allsv	37	8	6	14	16	3	0	1	1	0
2002–03	Rögle BK	Allsv	41	16	22	38	8	10	2	1	3	4
2003–04	Luleå HF	SEL	47	13	11	24	18	3	0	0	0	2
2004–05	Luleå HF	SEL	49	16	16	32	12	4	1	1	2	0
2005–06	Luleå HF	SEL	46	19	22	41	30	6	1	2	3	6
2006–07	Norfolk Admirals	AHL	65	15	26	41	18	6	3	4	7	0
2006–07	Chicago Blackhawks	NHL	3	0	2	2	2	—	—	—	—	—
2007–08	Frölunda HC	SEL	45	9	19	28	37	7	0	2	2	6
2008–09	Frölunda HC	SEL	37	8	6	14	6	—	—	—	—	—
2009–10	Brynäs IF	SEL	33	5	14	19	8	5	1	2	3	0
2010–11	Brynäs IF	SEL	50	13	18	31	18	1	0	0	0	0
2011–12	Brynäs IF	SEL	48	9	14	23	16	17	1	9	10	2
2012–13	Brynäs IF	SEL	48	4	13	17	20	2	0	1	1	0
2013–14	Brynäs IF	SHL	51	14	21	35	14	5	0	1	1	2
2014–15	Brynäs IF	SHL	53	6	16	22	8	7	2	2	4	2
2015–16	EC KAC	EBEL	46	3	16	19	14	7	1	1	2	10
SHL totals			541	118	172	290	191	57	6	20	26	20

=== International ===
Year	Team	Event	Result	GP	G	A	Pts	PIM
1999	Sweden	WJC18	2nd place, silver medalist(s)	7	1	2	3	0
2000	Sweden	WJC18	3rd place, bronze medalist(s)	6	2	4	6	0
2001	Sweden	WJC	2nd place, silver medalist(s)	7	0	2	2	0
2002	Sweden	WJC	6th	7	1	4	5	2
2006	Sweden	WC	1st place, gold medalist(s)	9	2	2	4	6
Junior totals				27	4	12	16	2
Senior totals				9	2	2	4	6

== Awards and honors ==
Award	Year
SHL
Le Mat trophy (Brynäs IF)	2012

== Transactions ==
- 24 June 2000 - Drafted by the Chicago Blackhawks in the 2nd round, 49th overall.
- 15 September 2009 - Signed a three-year contract with Brynäs IF
