= Karol Križan =

Slovak ice hockey player

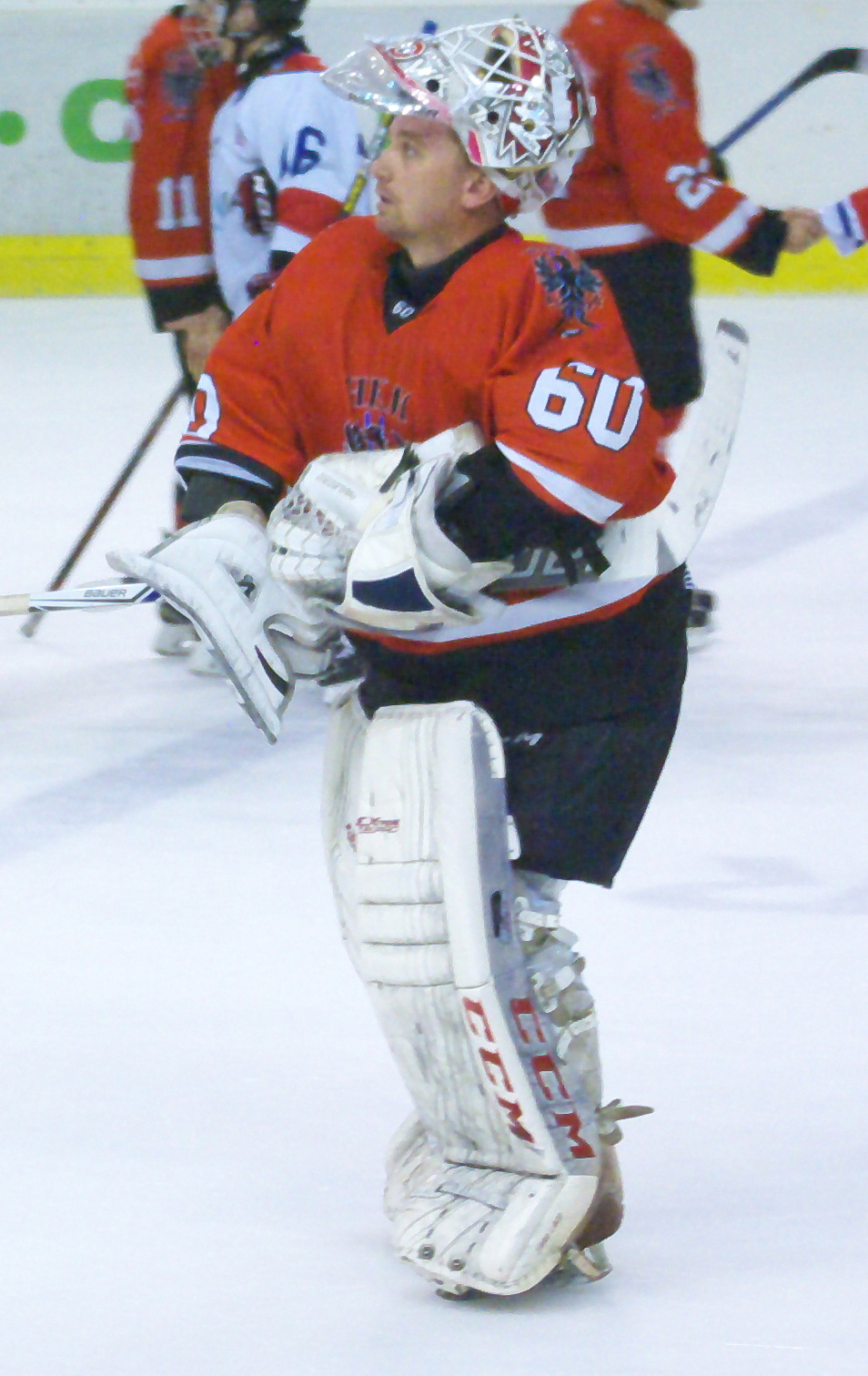
- Born: June 5, 1980 (age 45) Žilina, Czechoslovakia
- Height: 5 ft 10 in (178 cm)
- Weight: 185 lb (84 kg; 13 st 3 lb)
- Position: Goaltender
- Catches: Left
- Slovak 2. Liga team Former teams: HKM Rimavská Sobota; MHk 32 Liptovský Mikuláš; HKm Zvolen; MODO; HC Ambrì-Piotta; MHC Martin; HKm Detva; Växjö Lakers; Ritten/Renon; HK FTC Nové Zámky; Tønsberg Vikings; MsHK Žilina
- National team: Slovakia
- Playing career: 2000–present

Karol Križan (born June 5, 1980 in Žilina, Czechoslovakia, now Slovakia) is a professional Slovak professional ice hockey goaltender currently playing for HKM Rimavská Sobota in the Slovak 2. Liga.

== Career ==
Križan played three and a half seasons with Modo Hockey of the Swedish Elitserien between September 2005 and December 2008.

In the play of Modo against Timrå IK he scored a goal and recorded a shutout at the same time. He also led Modo to the Swedish Championship in 2007 with the help of his backup Michal Zajkowski. On December 17, 2008, he left Modo and moved to HC Ambrì-Piotta. On June 30, 2009, he returned to his homeland Slovakia to sign for MHC Martin.

Krizan was loaned to HK Detva of the Slovak 1.Liga during the season, playing four games there. Krizan then left Detva and Martin to sign with Växjö Lakers Hockey of the HockeyAllsvenskan on January 2, 2011. After the end of the 2010–11 season, Krizan was not offered an extended contract with Växjö. On July 28, 2011, Krizan signed a one-year contract with the Serie A team Sportverein Ritten-Renon. Before the 2013 season, Krizan signed a contract with Tønsberg Vikings in the Norwegian Get-ligaen.

== International ==
Krizan played with the Slovakia men's national ice hockey team in the 2004, 2005 and 2006 Men's World Ice Hockey Championships, as well as the 2006 Winter Olympics.
