= Andrei Kruchinin =

Kazakhstani-born Russian ice hockey player

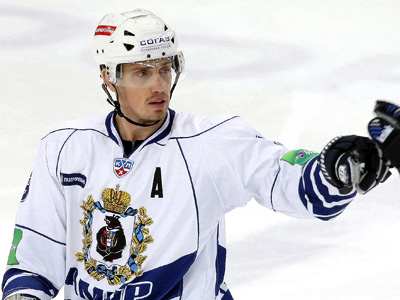
- Born: 18 May 1978 (age 47) Karaganda, Kazakhstan
- Height: 6 ft 1 in (185 cm)
- Weight: 196 lb (89 kg; 14 st 0 lb)
- Position: Defence
- Shot: Left
- National team: Russia
- NHL draft: 189th overall, 1998; Montreal Canadiens
- Playing career: 1996–2015

Andrei Kruchinin (born 18 May 1978) is a Kazakhstani-born Russian professional ice hockey defenceman. He was selected by the Montreal Canadiens in the 7th round (189th overall) of the 1998 NHL entry draft.

Kruchinin competed in the 2006 IIHF World Championship as a member of the Russia men's national ice hockey team.
