= Denis Arkhipov =

Russian ice hockey player (born 1979)

- Born: May 19, 1979 (age 47) Kazan, Russian SFSR, URS
- Height: 6 ft 4 in (193 cm)
- Weight: 213 lb (97 kg; 15 st 3 lb)
- Position: Centre
- Shot: Left
- KHL team Former teams: Torpedo Nizhny Novgorod; Ak Bars Kazan; Nashville Predators; Chicago Blackhawks; Atlant Moscow Oblast; Neftekhimik Nizhnekamsk; CSKA Moscow
- National team: Russia
- NHL draft: 60th overall, 1998; Nashville Predators
- Playing career: 1996–2013

Denis Mikhailovich Arkhipov (Russian: Денис Михайлович Архипов; born May 19, 1979) is a Russian former professional ice hockey player. He played in the National Hockey League (NHL) with the Nashville Predators and Chicago Blackhawks between 2000 and 2007, and then in the Kontinental Hockey League between 2008 and 2013. Internationally Arkhipov played for the Russian national team at the junior and senior level, including the 2003 and 2006 World Championships.

== Playing career ==
Arkhipov was selected 60th overall in the third round of the 1998 NHL entry draft, the second choice of the Nashville Predators.

He made his National Hockey League (NHL) debut on January 8, 2001 in a 2–1 loss against the Vancouver Canucks in Vancouver. During this game he notched his first NHL point when he got an assist on a Richard Lintner goal against Bob Essensa. Two days later he scored his first NHL goal in a 5–2 win at the Edmonton Oilers. He scored when he took a Scott Hartnell pass and got it past Tommy Salo. He also got an assist on a Marián Cisár goal to make this his first ever NHL multi-point game.

In the 2001–02 NHL season he played in all 82 games with a career high 42 points. He led the Predators in goals, game-winning goals (6) and shooting percentage (16.9%). That year he centered the "Vowel Line" which also included, Vladimír Országh on right wing, and Martin Erat at left wing. They were called the Vowel Line because their last names all start with vowels.

Arkhipov played the 2004–05 NHL lockout season in the Russian Super League, and remained there for the 2005–06 season before signing as a free agent with the Chicago Blackhawks on July 6, 2006.

== Records ==
Youngest player in Predator's franchise history to score 20 goals.

== Career statistics ==
=== Regular season and playoffs ===
			Regular season					Playoffs
Season	Team	League	GP	G	A	Pts	PIM	GP	G	A	Pts	PIM
1994–95	Itil–2 Kazan	RUS-2	2	0	0	0	0	—	—	—	—	—
1995–96	Ak Bars–2 Kazan	RUS-2	38	4	4	8	0	—	—	—	—	—
1996–97	Ak Bars Kazan	RSL	1	1	0	1	0	—	—	—	—	—
1996–97	Ak Bars–2 Kazan	RUS-3	26	8	5	13	4	—	—	—	—	—
1997–98	Ak Bars Kazan	RSL	30	2	2	4	2	—	—	—	—	—
1997–98	Ak Bars–2 Kazan	RUS-3	13	6	7	13	6	—	—	—	—	—
1998–99	Ak Bars Kazan	RSL	35	12	1	13	22	13	5	3	8	6
1998–99	Ak Bars–2 Kazan	RUS-3	3	1	1	2	0	—	—	—	—	—
1999–00	Ak Bars Kazan	RSL	32	7	10	17	14	18	5	5	10	4
2000–01	Milwaukee Admirals	IHL	40	9	8	17	11	—	—	—	—	—
2000–01	Nashville Predators	NHL	40	6	7	13	4	—	—	—	—	—
2001–02	Nashville Predators	NHL	82	20	22	42	16	—	—	—	—	—
2002–03	Nashville Predators	NHL	79	11	24	35	32	—	—	—	—	—
2003–04	Nashville Predators	NHL	72	9	12	21	22	—	—	—	—	—
2004–05	Ak Bars Kazan	RSL	45	9	8	17	28	4	0	0	0	0
2005–06	Khimik Moscow Oblast	RSL	50	8	8	16	28	9	2	1	3	0
2006–07	Chicago Blackhawks	NHL	79	10	17	27	54	—	—	—	—	—
2007–08	Ak Bars Kazan	RSL	56	10	17	27	22	9	1	3	4	6
2008–09	Atlant Moscow Oblast	KHL	56	10	12	22	24	7	1	3	4	8
2009–10	Neftekhimik Nizhnekamsk	KHL	55	14	15	29	48	4	1	0	1	4
2011–12	Neftekhimik Nizhnekamsk	KHL	54	9	17	26	60	—	—	—	—	—
2012–13	CSKA Moscow	KHL	8	0	2	2	4	—	—	—	—	—
2012–13	Torpedo Nizhny Novgorod	KHL	8	1	1	2	0	—	—	—	—	—
RSL totals			249	49	46	95	116	53	13	12	25	16
KHL totals			181	34	47	81	136	11	2	4	6	12
NHL totals			352	56	82	138	128	—	—	—	—	—

=== International ===
Medal record

Representing Russia

World Junior Championships
Gold medal – first place	1999 Winnipeg	

Year	Team	Event	GP	G	A	Pts	PIM
1998	Russia	WJC	7	1	2	3	2
1999	Russia	WJC	7	5	2	7	4
2003	Russia	WC	7	2	1	3	12
2006	Russia	WC	7	2	4	6	6
Junior totals			14	6	4	10	6
Senior totals			14	4	5	9	18
