= Dmitri Bykov (ice hockey) =

Russian ice hockey player (born 1977)

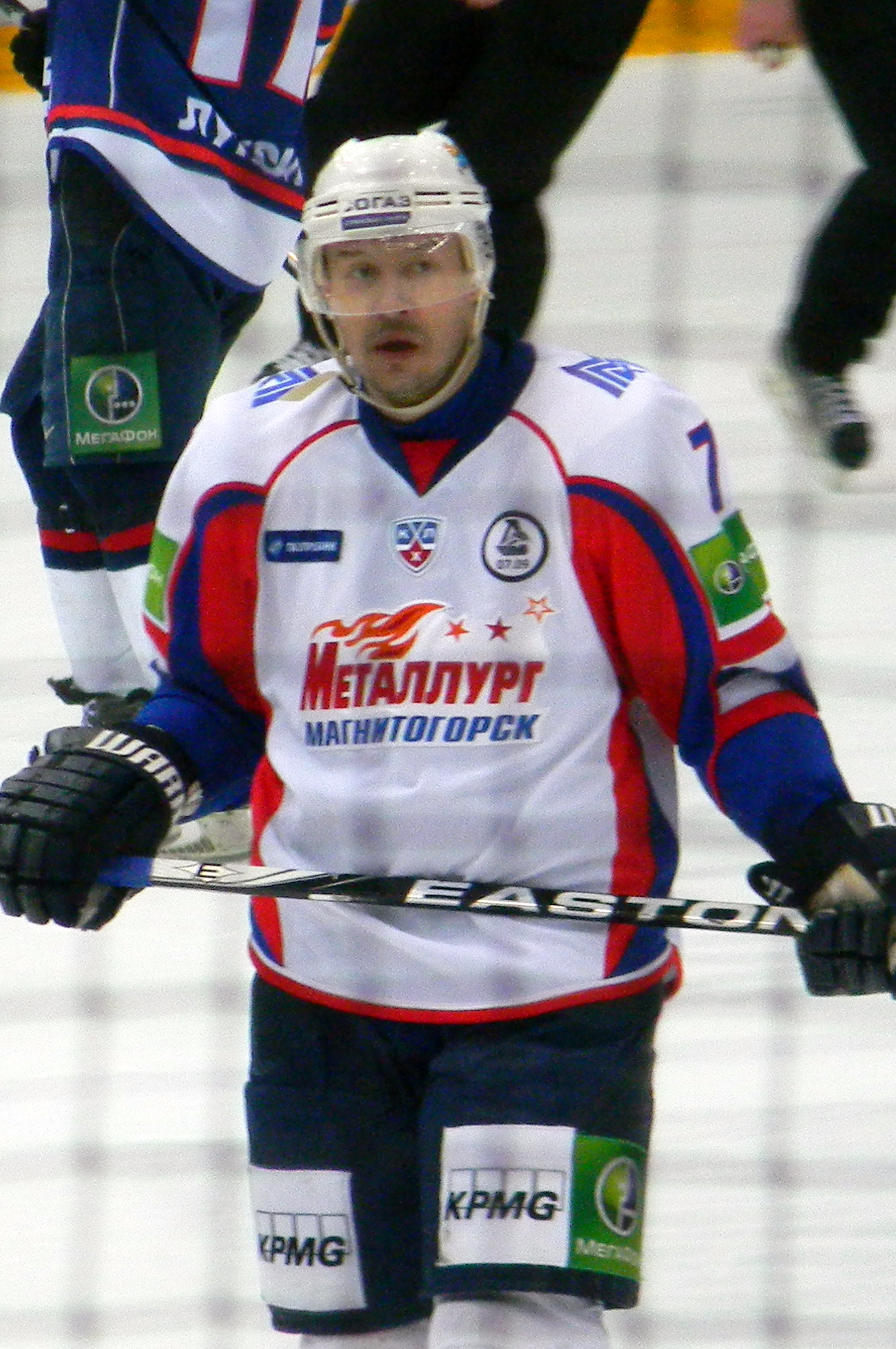
- Born: May 5, 1977 (age 49) Izhevsk, Soviet Union
- Height: 6 ft 1 in (185 cm)
- Weight: 194 lb (88 kg; 13 st 12 lb)
- Position: Defence
- Shot: Left
- Played for: CSK VVS Samara; Lada Tolyatti; Torpedo Yaroslavl; Ak Bars Kazan; Detroit Red Wings; Dynamo Moscow; Atlant Moscow Oblast; Metallurg Magnitogorsk; Torpedo Nizhny Novgorod; Amur Khabarovsk
- National team: Russia
- NHL draft: 258th Overall, 2001; Detroit Red Wings
- Playing career: 1995–2015

Dmitri Vyacheslavovich Bykov (Russian: Дми́трий Вячесла́вович Бы́ков; born May 5, 1977) is a Russian former ice hockey defenceman.

== Playing career ==
Bykov has played one season in the NHL, the 2002–03 season with the Detroit Red Wings. In 71 games, he scored two goals and 10 assists for 12 points, with 43 penalty minutes. Bykov and Red Wings management had an agreement where Bykov could opt to return to Russia after the sole season, which he did.

== Career statistics ==
=== Regular season and playoffs ===
			Regular season					Playoffs
Season	Team	League	GP	G	A	Pts	PIM	GP	G	A	Pts	PIM
1994–95	Sokol Lukhovitsy	RUS-4	30	5	—	—	—	4	0	0	0	2
1995–96	CSK VVS Samara	IHL	50	1	2	3	39	—	—	—	—	—
1996–97	CSK VVS Samara	RSL	44	1	6	7	20	2	0	0	0	2
1997–98	CSK VVS Samara	RSL	27	0	5	5	14	—	—	—	—	—
1997–98	Lada Tolyatti	RSL	9	0	1	1	4	—	—	—	—	—
1997–98	Torpedo Yaroslavl	RSL	10	1	2	3	6	7	0	1	1	10
1998–99	CSK VVS Samara	RSL	2	0	0	0	0	—	—	—	—	—
1998–99	Lada Tolyatti	RSL	39	0	6	6	24	7	1	0	1	8
1999–2000	Ak Bars Kazan	RSL	35	3	8	11	18	18	0	2	2	8
1999–2000	Ak Bars–2 Kazan	RUS-3	3	0	1	1	4	—	—	—	—	—
2000–01	Ak Bars Kazan	RSL	33	3	7	10	24	4	0	1	1	4
2000–01	Ak Bars–2 Kazan	RUS-3	2	1	0	1	2	—	—	—	—	—
2001–02	Ak Bars Kazan	RSL	50	1	1	2	38	11	0	0	0	4
2002–03	Detroit Red Wings	NHL	71	2	10	12	43	4	0	0	0	0
2003–04	Ak Bars Kazan	RSL	55	5	11	16	42	8	2	1	3	14
2004–05	Ak Bars Kazan	RSL	31	2	2	4	22	4	0	0	0	0
2005–06	Dynamo Moscow	RSL	26	3	2	5	16	4	0	1	1	4
2006–07	Khimik Moscow Oblast	RSL	46	11	6	17	48	1	0	0	0	0
2007–08	Khimik Moscow Oblast	RSL	45	4	13	17	61	5	1	2	3	6
2008–09	Atlant Moscow Oblast	KHL	54	7	13	20	54	7	1	2	3	6
2009–10	Atlant Moscow Oblast	KHL	54	4	14	18	46	—	—	—	—	—
2010–11	Atlant Moscow Oblast	KHL	53	3	12	15	46	24	1	3	4	14
2011–12	Atlant Moscow Oblast	KHL	49	2	8	10	30	—	—	—	—	—
2012–13	Torpedo Nizhny Novgorod	KHL	28	0	0	0	25	—	—	—	—	—
2013–14	Amur Khabarovsk	KHL	37	2	3	5	12	—	—	—	—	—
IHL & RSL totals			509	35	74	109	382	70	4	9	13	56
NHL totals			71	2	10	12	43	4	0	0	0	0
KHL totals			275	18	52	70	213	46	4	5	9	28

=== International ===
Year	Team	Event	GP	G	A	Pts	PIM
1999	Russia	WC	6	0	0	0	10
2002	Russia	WC	5	3	1	4	2
2004	Russia	WC	6	0	0	0	4
2006	Russia	WC	7	2	1	3	6
Senior totals			24	5	2	7	22
