= Dušan Milo =

Slovak ice hockey player

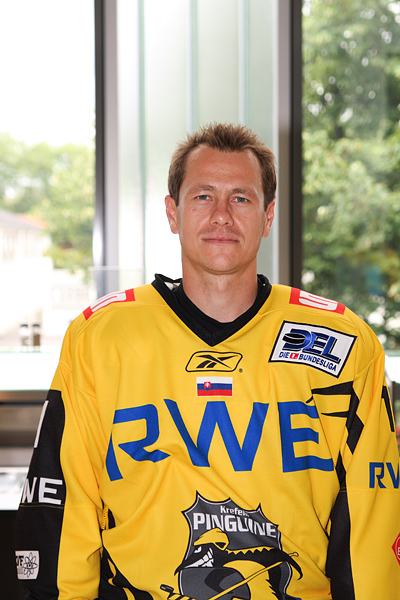
- Born: March 5, 1973 (age 52); Nitra, Czechoslovakia
- Height: 5 ft 10 in (178 cm)
- Weight: 185 lb (84 kg; 13 st 3 lb)
- Position: Defence
- Shot: Left
- Slovak Extraliga team: HK Nitra
- National team: Slovakia
- NHL draft: Undrafted
- Playing career: 1993–2018

Dušan Milo (born March 5, 1973) is a Slovak professional ice hockey defenceman. He is currently playing for HK Nitra in the Slovak Extraliga (SVK).

== Career statistics ==
=== Regular season and playoffs ===
			Regular season					Playoffs
Season	Team	League	GP	G	A	Pts	PIM	GP	G	A	Pts	PIM
1993–94	AC/HC Nitra	SVK	36	1	8	9		—	—	—	—	—
1994–95	AC/HC Nitra	SVK	33	5	8	13	10	—	—	—	—	—
1995–96	AC/HC Nitra	SVK	41	6	9	15	10	—	—	—	—	—
1996–97	AC/HC Nitra	SVK	49	8	22	30	38	—	—	—	—	—
1997–98	HKm Nitra	SVK	33	2	10	12	10	—	—	—	—	—
1998–99	HKm Nitra	SVK	50	9	20	29	32	—	—	—	—	—
1999–2000	HK 36 Skalica	SVK	56	4	8	12	20	—	—	—	—	—
2000–01	HKm Zvolen	SVK	55	6	12	18	24	10	2	2	4	2
2001–02	HKm Zvolen	SVK	47	7	14	21	20	—	—	—	—	—
2002–03	Modo Hockey	SEL	47	4	7	11	22	6	0	2	2	6
2003–04	Modo Hockey	SEL	26	2	1	3	16	—	—	—	—	—
2003–04	Lausanne HC	NLA	10	0	6	6	20	—	—	—	—	—
2004–05	HKm Nitra	SVK	37	4	11	15	18	5	1	4	5	4
2005–06	HK Dynamax Nitra	SVK	54	5	27	32	50	13	2	2	4	25
2006–07	Krefeld Pinguine	DEL	50	3	19	22	36	2	0	0	0	0
2007–08	Krefeld Pinguine	DEL	49	11	31	42	26	—	—	—	—	—
2008–09	Krefeld Pinguine	DEL	50	7	26	33	44	7	0	0	0	16
2009–10	Krefeld Pinguine	DEL	4	0	2	2	2	—	—	—	—	—
2010–11	Krefeld Pinguine	DEL	51	5	26	31	40	8	0	1	1	4
2011–12	Krefeld Pinguine	DEL	52	2	16	18	44	—	—	—	—	—
2012–13	Krefeld Pinguine	DEL	37	2	9	11	49	2	0	0	0	0
2013–14	HK Nitra	SVK	56	4	29	33	34	16	1	4	5	0
2014–15	HK Nitra	SVK	55	1	15	16	14	12	1	2	3	6
2015–16	HK Nitra	SVK	46	2	8	10	12	15	0	2	2	4
2018–19	HK Levice	SVK.3	11	0	5	5	4	—	—	—	—	—
SVK totals			648	64	201	265	292	71	7	16	23	41
DEL totals			293	30	129	159	241	19	0	1	1	20

=== International ===
He played 90 matches in the Slovak national team, scored 15 goals. He holds a gold medal from the 2002 World Championships and a bronze medal from the 2003 World Championships. He also represented at the 2006 World Championships and the 2002 Olympic Games in Salt Lake City.

WC 2002

His first world championships were the World Cup in Sweden, when he was a member of the team coach Ján Floc. He played in the third defensive pair with Martin Štrbák. [3] He scored the only goal of Slovakia in the match against Finland in the basic group (1: 2). He scored the winning goal in the superstructure against the home team Sweden (2: 1). He also scored in the group's match against Russia (6: 4). Slovakia won over Russia in the final 4: 3 and became the world champion.

WC 2006

Coach František Hossa nominated him for the Latvian Riga World Championship. In the match against Switzerland, he scored the second goal of Slovakia (2: 2). He also scored in the match against Ukraine in the last match of the superstructure part (9: 0). He scored his team's only goal in the quarterfinals against Canada (1: 4).

Year	Team	Event	GP	G	A	Pts	PIM
2002	Slovakia	OG	2	0	2	2	0
2002	Slovakia	WC	9	3	2	5	4
2003	Slovakia	WC	9	0	1	1	6
2006	Slovakia	WC	7	3	3	6	2
Senior totals			27	6	8	14	12
