= Marc Reichert =

Swiss ice hockey player

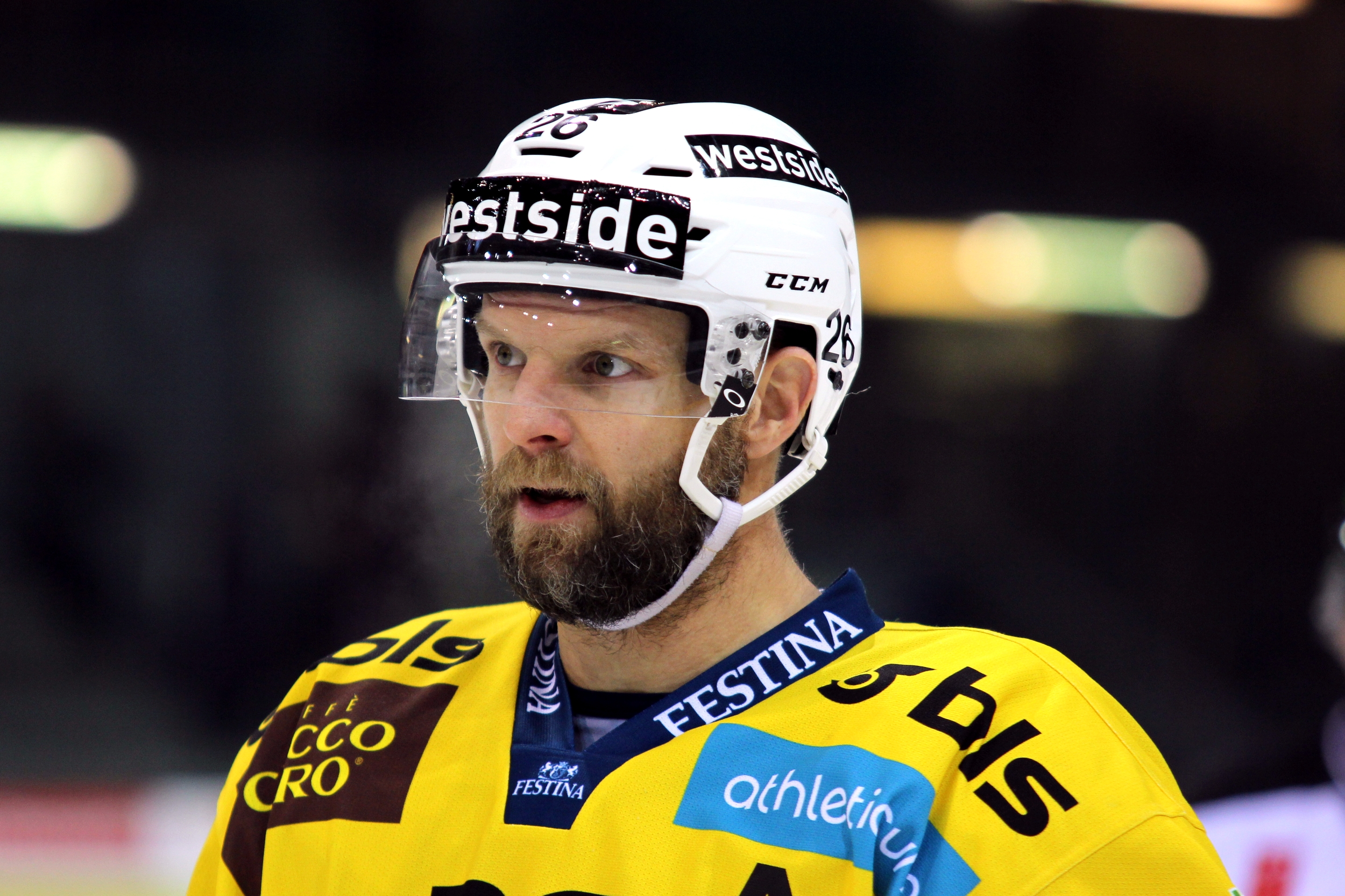
- Born: March 22, 1980 (age 44); Bern, Switzerland
- Height: 6 ft 3 in (191 cm)
- Weight: 209 lb (95 kg; 14 st 13 lb)
- Position: Forward
- Shoots: Left
- NLA team Former teams: SC Bern; Kloten Flyers; HC Ambrì-Piotta
- National team: Switzerland
- Playing career: 1997–present

Marc Reichert (born March 22, 1980) is a Swiss professional ice hockey player. He is currently playing for the SC Bern of Switzerland's National League A (NLA).
