= Jesper Mattsson (ice hockey) =

Swedish ice hockey player (born 1975)

- Born: May 13, 1975 (age 51) Malmö, SWE
- Height: 5 ft 11 in (180 cm)
- Weight: 198 lb (90 kg; 14 st 2 lb)
- Position: Forward
- Shoots: Right
- Played for: Saint John Flames; Färjestad BK; Malmö Redhawks
- NHL draft: 18th overall, 1993; Calgary Flames
- Playing career: 1991–present

Jesper Mattsson (born May 13, 1975) is a retired Swedish professional ice hockey centre. He was drafted by the Calgary Flames in the 1993 NHL entry draft in the 1st round as the 18th pick overall.

== Career ==
When Mattsson was a junior, he was considered to be a big star in the future and in 1991, at just 16 years old, he played in Elitserien for his hometown club Malmö IF and before turing 19, he had won the Swedish championship twice (1992 and 1994). In 1993 Calgary Flames drafted him 18th overall in the 1993 NHL Draft. After his fourth season in Elitserien with Malmö IF, Mattsson signed a contract with the Flames. But Mattsson had a rough time in North America, and despite 2 1/2 seasons there he never dressed for a single Flames game, and played exclusively with Calgary's farm team, the Saint John Flames of the AHL. During his third season with Saint John he decided to move back to Sweden and Malmö IF and he finished the season with Malmö. He continued to play with Malmö for another six years with varied results.

In the summer of 2004 he decided it was time to move again and this time he signed a three-year contract with Malmö rival SEL team, Färjestad BK. His first seasons with Färjestad was a big disappointment, he only scored 15 points in 48 games, his worst season since 1994. But he played better in the playoffs, scoring 8 points in 15 games. But despite Mattsson's effort Färjestad lost in the finals against Frölunda HC. In his second season with Färjestad he showed the fans that he could play better and he scored 32 points (19 goals, 13 assists) in 45 games. His 19 goals was career high for Mattsson. Mattsson had a good post-season that year as well, tallying 17 points in 18 games, and helped Färjestad capture the Swedish championship.

For the 2010–11 season, Jesper Mattsson returned to Malmö, this time in the second-tier league HockeyAllsvenskan. He played there for two seasons, scoring 58 points in 77 games. After the 2011–12 season, Mattsson retired from ice hockey as he was not offered a new contract with Malmö.

== Changing position ==
For the 2007-08 season, Mattsson was briefly converted into playing defense after playing as a forward his whole career up to this point.

== International ==
Mattsson represented Sweden in the 1999 Ice Hockey World Championship, winning a Bronze medal, and in the 2006 Ice Hockey World Championship, winning a Gold medal.

== Career statistics ==
=== Regular season and playoffs ===
			Regular season					Playoffs
Season	Team	League	GP	G	A	Pts	PIM	GP	G	A	Pts	PIM
1991–92	Malmö IF	SEL	24	0	1	1	2	—	—	—	—	—
1992–93	Malmö IF	SEL	40	9	9	18	14	5	0	0	0	0
1993–94	Malmö IF	SWE U20	5	5	0	5	14	—	—	—	—	—
1993–94	Malmö IF	SEL	40	3	6	9	14	9	1	2	3	2
1994–95	Malmö IF	SEL	36	9	6	15	30	9	2	0	2	18
1995–96	Saint John Flames	AHL	73	12	26	38	18	9	1	1	2	2
1996–97	Saint John Flames	AHL	72	22	18	40	32	3	1	1	2	0
1997–98	Saint John Flames	AHL	29	7	11	18	30	—	—	—	—	—
1997–98	Malmö IF	SEL	16	3	5	8	8	—	—	—	—	—
1998–99	Malmö IF	SEL	48	14	16	30	49	8	2	1	3	4
1999–2000	Malmö IF	SEL	50	17	19	36	40	6	0	0	0	6
2000–01	Malmö IF	SEL	49	17	17	34	63	9	2	2	4	6
2001–02	MIF Redhawks	SEL	49	12	10	22	26	5	1	1	2	4
2002–03	MIF Redhawks	SEL	42	13	12	25	32	—	—	—	—	—
2003–04	MIF Redhawks	SEL	48	19	14	33	24	—	—	—	—	—
2004–05	Färjestads BK	SEL	48	5	10	15	47	15	4	4	8	6
2005–06	Färjestads BK	SEL	45	19	13	32	50	18	4	13	17	16
2006–07	Färjestads BK	SEL	51	10	26	36	79	9	1	3	4	12
2007–08	Färjestads BK	SEL	46	4	24	28	71	12	3	4	7	10
2008–09	Färjestads BK	SEL	45	17	21	38	34	13	1	4	5	8
2009–10	Färjestads BK	SEL	52	3	24	27	50	7	2	2	4	6
2010–11	Malmö Redhawks	SWE.2	28	8	15	23	20	—	—	—	—	—
2010–11	Frölunda HC	SEL	23	7	8	15	8	—	—	—	—	—
2011–12	Malmö Redhawks	SWE.2	49	16	19	35	30	6	0	0	0	10
SEL totals			752	181	241	422	629	125	23	36	59	98
AHL totals			174	41	55	96	80	12	2	2	4	2

=== International ===
Year	Team	Event	GP	G	A	Pts	PIM
1992	Sweden	EJC	5	2	1	3	0
1993	Sweden	EJC	6	8	2	10	12
1995	Sweden	WJC	7	0	6	6	22
1999	Sweden	WC	10	0	1	1	4
2006	Sweden	WC	9	2	3	5	4
Junior totals			18	10	9	19	34
Senior totals			19	2	4	6	8

Preceded by Cory Stillman	Calgary Flames' first-round draft pick 1993	Succeeded by Chris Dingman
