= Ivan Čiernik =

Slovak ice hockey player (born 1977)

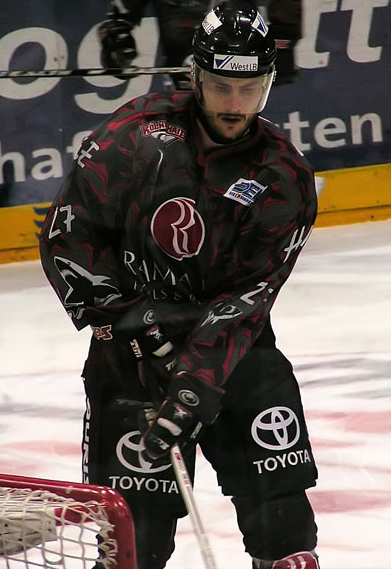
- Born: October 30, 1977 (age 48) Levice, Czechoslovakia
- Height: 6 ft 1 in (185 cm)
- Weight: 222 lb (101 kg; 15 st 12 lb)
- Position: Left wing
- Shot: Left
- Played for: Ottawa Senators; Washington Capitals; EHC Wolfsburg; Kölner Haie; HC Sibir Novosibirsk; Malmö Redhawks; Hannover Scorpions; Augsburger Panther
- National team: Slovakia
- NHL draft: 216th overall, 1996; Ottawa Senators
- Playing career: 1997–2018

Ivan Čiernik (born October 30, 1977) is a Slovak former professional ice hockey player. He last played for Eispiraten Crimmitschau of DEL2. He also previously played in the National Hockey League (NHL). Čiernik played a total of 89 games in the NHL for the Ottawa Senators and Washington Capitals.

== Playing career ==
Čiernik was drafted as 216th overall in 1996 by the Ottawa Senators. He has played for the Washington Capitals and played a total of 89 regular season NHL games, scoring 12 goals and 14 assists. He has also played for Kölner Haie of the Deutsche Eishockey Liga (DEL) and for Sibir Novosibirsk of the Kontinental Hockey League (KHL).

On July 22, 2011, Čiernik signed a one-year contract (with an optional one-year extension) with the Malmö Redhawks of the HockeyAllsvenskan.

The following season, Čiernik returned to the DEL signing a contract with his third German club, the Hannover Scorpions on July 9, 2012. After one season, with the Scorpions ceasing participation in the DEL, Čiernik left to sign a one-year contract with Augsburger Panther on July 5, 2013.

== Career statistics ==
=== Regular season and playoffs ===
			Regular season					Playoffs
Season	Team	League	GP	G	A	Pts	PIM	GP	G	A	Pts	PIM
1994–95	HC Nitra	Slovak U20	30	22	15	37	36	—	—	—	—	—
1994–95	HK Nitra	Slovak	7	1	0	1	2	—	—	—	—	—
1995–96	HC Nitra	Slovak U20	4	4	1	5	58	—	—	—	—	—
1995–96	HK Nitra	Slovak	35	9	7	16	36	8	3	3	6	6
1996–97	HC Nitra	Slovak U20	4	5	4	9	0	—	—	—	—	—
1996–97	HK Nitra	Slovak	41	11	19	30	78	—	—	—	—	—
1997–98	Ottawa Senators	NHL	2	0	0	0	0	—	—	—	—	—
1997–98	Worcester IceCats	AHL	53	9	12	21	38	1	0	0	0	2
1998–99	Adirondack Red Wings	AHL	21	1	4	5	4	—	—	—	—	—
1998–99	Cincinnati Mighty Ducks	AHL	32	10	3	13	10	2	0	0	0	2
1999–00	Grand Rapids Griffins	IHL	66	13	12	25	64	6	0	6	6	2
2000–01	Ottawa Senators	NHL	4	2	0	2	2	—	—	—	—	—
2000–01	Grand Rapids Griffins	IHL	66	27	38	65	53	10	5	6	11	26
2001–02	Ottawa Senators	NHL	23	1	2	3	4	—	—	—	—	—
2001–02	Grand Rapids Griffins	AHL	2	2	1	3	0	—	—	—	—	—
2001–02	Washington Capitals	NHL	6	0	1	1	2	—	—	—	—	—
2001–02	Portland Pirates	AHL	26	10	5	15	28	—	—	—	—	—
2002–03	Washington Capitals	NHL	47	8	10	18	24	2	1	0	1	6
2002–03	Portland Pirates	AHL	13	4	6	10	6	—	—	—	—	—
2003–04	Washington Capitals	NHL	7	1	1	2	0	—	—	—	—	—
2003–04	Portland Pirates	AHL	54	10	21	31	43	7	2	1	3	0
2004–05	Grizzly Adams Wolfsburg	DEL	50	26	22	48	91	7	4	2	6	22
2005–06	Kölner Haie	DEL	51	29	31	60	86	9	4	2	6	30
2006–07	Kölner Haie	DEL	47	17	31	48	58	9	6	5	11	18
2007–08	Kölner Haie	DEL	56	38	28	66	104	14	11	2	13	14
2008–09	HC Sibir Novosibirsk	KHL	50	5	14	19	40	—	—	—	—	—
2009–10	Kölner Haie	DEL	55	27	30	57	89	3	3	0	3	2
2010–11	Kölner Haie	DEL	52	12	23	35	30	5	1	3	4	18
2011–12	Malmö Redhawks	Allsv	41	7	6	13	24	—	—	—	—	—
2012–13	Hannover Scorpions	DEL	52	25	20	45	46	—	—	—	—	—
2013–14	Augsburger Panther	DEL	52	20	25	45	44	—	—	—	—	—
2014–15	Augsburger Panther	DEL	52	16	14	30	53	—	—	—	—	—
2015–16	Augsburger Panther	DEL	50	9	9	18	26	—	—	—	—	—
NHL totals			89	12	14	26	32	2	0	1	1	6
