= Konstantin Gorovikov =

Russian ice hockey player

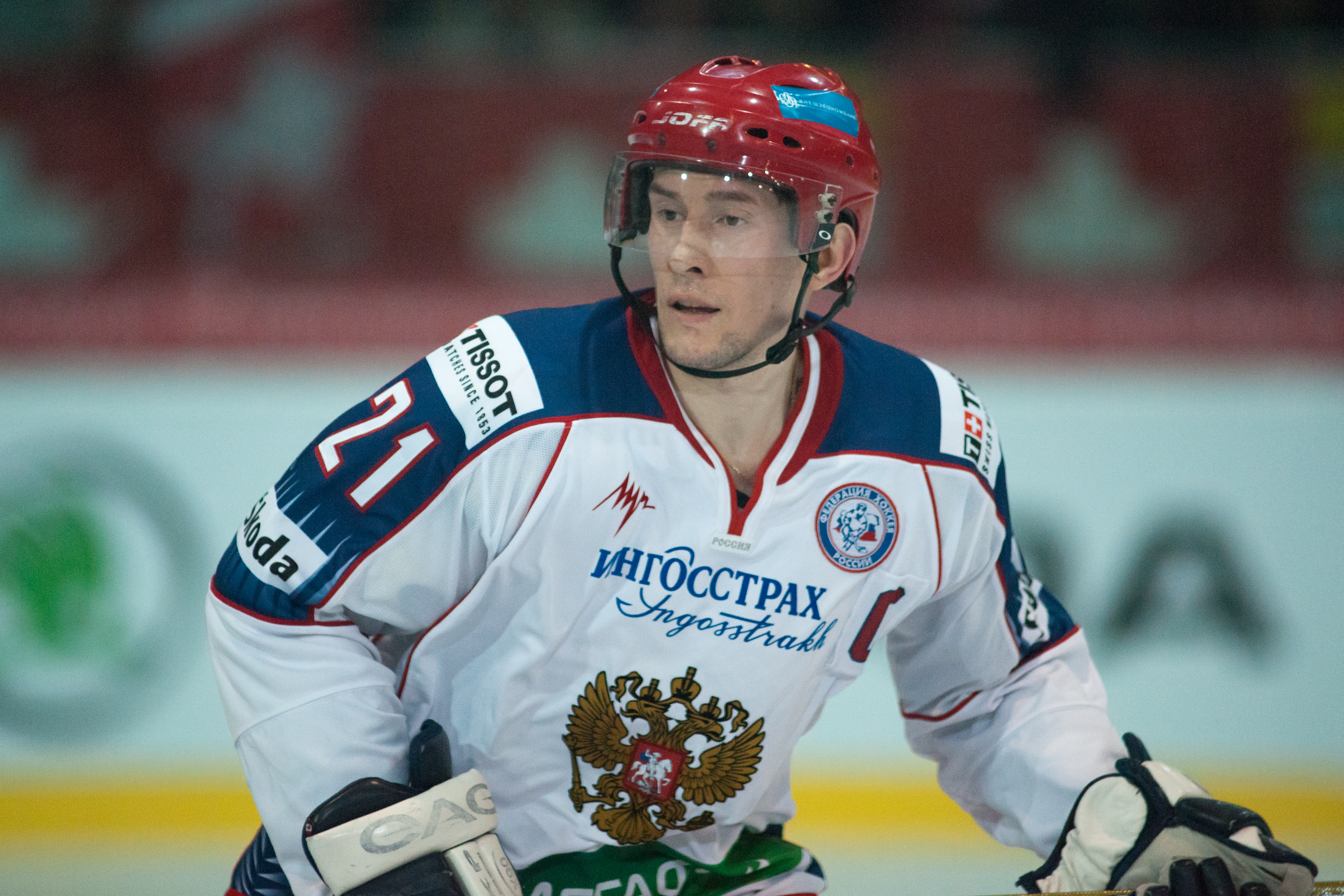
- Born: August 31, 1977 (age 48) Novosibirsk, Russian SFSR, Soviet Union
- Height: 5 ft 11.5 in (182 cm)
- Weight: 178 lb (81 kg; 12 st 10 lb)
- Position: Centre
- Shot: Left
- Played for: Salavat Yulaev Ufa; Severstal Cherepovets; Avangard Omsk; SKA Saint Petersburg; Dynamo Moscow
- National team: Russia
- NHL draft: 269th overall, 1999; Ottawa Senators
- Playing career: 1994–2017

Konstantin Vladimirovich Gorovikov (Russian: Константин Владимирович Горовиков; born August 31, 1977) is a Russian former professional ice hockey forward He most recently played for Dynamo Moscow of the Kontinental Hockey League (KHL). He was a member of the Russia men's national ice hockey team and won the 2008 IIHF World Championship and 2009 IIHF World Championship. He won the Gagarin Cup twice with Dynamo in 2012 and 2013.

== Career statistics ==
=== Regular season and playoffs ===
			Regular season					Playoffs
Season	Team	League	GP	G	A	Pts	PIM	GP	G	A	Pts	PIM
1994–95	SKA Saint Petersburg	IHL	13	1	0	1	4	2	0	0	0	0
1995–96	SKA Saint Petersburg	IHL	45	2	4	6	18	2	0	0	0	0
1996–97	SKA Saint Petersburg	RSL	37	4	2	6	18	—	—	—	—	—
1997–98	SKA Saint Petersburg	RSL	44	6	12	18	22	—	—	—	—	—
1998–99	SKA Saint Petersburg	RSL	42	12	7	19	14	—	—	—	—	—
1999–00	Grand Rapids Griffins	IHL	57	9	14	23	30	8	1	0	1	4
2000–01	Grand Rapids Griffins	IHL	68	7	19	26	48	—	—	—	—	—
2001–02	Salavat Yulaev Ufa	RSL	51	13	18	31	32	—	—	—	—	—
2002–03	Salavat Yulaev Ufa	RSL	48	10	5	15	44	3	0	1	1	0
2003–04	Severstal Cherepovets	RSL	50	7	9	16	26	—	—	—	—	—
2004–05	SKA Saint Petersburg	RSL	60	14	19	33	48	—	—	—	—	—
2005–06	Avangard Omsk	RSL	49	14	15	29	62	13	2	3	5	16
2006–07	Avangard Omsk	RSL	54	12	16	28	70	11	2	2	4	6
2007–08	SKA Saint Petersburg	RSL	50	12	22	34	40	9	0	2	2	31
2008–09	SKA Saint Petersburg	KHL	48	10	11	21	50	3	0	1	1	4
2009–10	SKA Saint Petersburg	KHL	53	7	17	24	32	3	0	2	2	0
2010–11	Dynamo Moscow	KHL	54	11	27	38	32	6	2	2	4	2
2011–12	Dynamo Moscow	KHL	43	6	13	19	28	21	6	14	20	16
2012–13	Dynamo Moscow	KHL	40	2	16	18	22	21	2	7	9	16
2013–14	Dynamo Moscow	KHL	42	4	20	24	38	7	0	2	2	8
2014–15	Dynamo Moscow	KHL	48	5	14	19	42	3	1	0	1	0
2015–16	Dynamo Moscow	KHL	55	7	14	21	36	9	2	2	4	2
2016–17	Dynamo Moscow	KHL	48	3	13	16	14	10	0	0	0	8
RSL totals			485	104	125	229	376	36	4	8	12	53
KHL totals			431	55	145	200	294	83	13	30	43	56

=== International ===
Year	Team	Event	Result	GP	G	A	Pts	PIM
2006	Russia	WC	5th	7	1	3	4	8
2008	Russia	WC	1st place, gold medalist(s)	9	2	2	4	8
2009	Russia	WC	1st place, gold medalist(s)	9	1	4	5	4
2011	Russia	WC	4th	9	0	2	2	2
Senior totals				34	4	11	15	22
