= Daniel Nielsen =

Danish ice hockey player

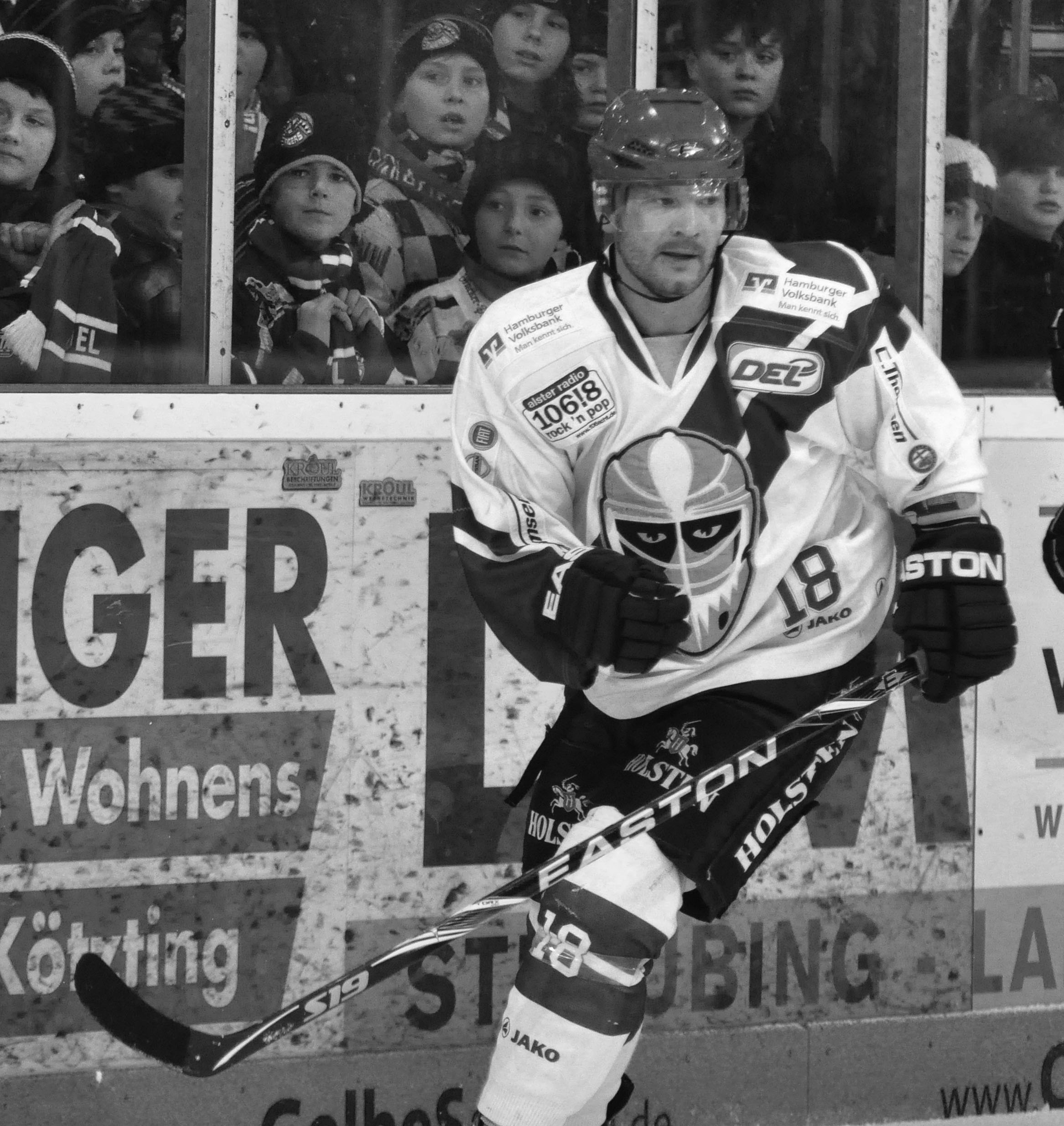
- Born: October 31, 1980 (age 45) Herning, Denmark
- Height: 1.83 m (6 ft 0 in)
- Weight: 80 kg (176 lb; 12 st 8 lb)
- Position: Defence
- Shoots: Right
- ML team Former teams: Herning Blue Fox; Leksands IF; Hamburg Freezers
- National team: Denmark
- Playing career: 1998–present

Daniel Nielsen (born October 31, 1980) is a Danish professional ice hockey player who is currently playing for the Herning Blue Fox of the Metal Ligaen. He played for German club Hamburg Freezers after spending the majority of his professional career with current club Herning Blue Fox in Denmark's top league, AL-Bank Ligaen. Nielsen has competed in several World Cup events including 2002, 2003, 2004, 2006, 2007, 2008, 2009, and also the 2010 IIHF World Championship as a member of the Denmark men's national ice hockey team.
