= Vadim Khomitsky =

Russian ice hockey player (born 1982)

- Born: July 21, 1982 (age 43) Voskresensk, Soviet Union
- Height: 6 ft 1 in (185 cm)
- Weight: 196 lb (89 kg; 14 st 0 lb)
- Position: Defence
- Shot: Left
- Played for: CSKA Moscow; Iowa Stars; HC Khimik Voskresensk; Atlant Moscow Oblast; Ak Bars Kazan; Torpedo Nizhny Novgorod; Avangard Omsk; HC Sochi
- National team: Russia
- NHL draft: 123rd overall, 2000; Dallas Stars
- Playing career: 1998–2019

Vadim Khomitsky (born July 21, 1982) is a Russian former professional ice hockey defenceman who is currently an assistant coach for HC Sochi in the Kontinental Hockey League (KHL) with whom he last played for.

Khomitsky was drafted 123rd overall in the 2000 NHL entry draft by the Dallas Stars. He spent four seasons with CSKA Moscow before signing with the Stars organization. He played 16 games over two seasons for the Iowa Stars in the American Hockey League, splitting his time in Russia with Khimik Mytishchi.

== Personal life ==
In 2006, he married former ice skating champion Maria Butyrskaya. She is a figure skater who, in 1998, had posed for the Russian edition of Playboy magazine. They have three children together.

== Career statistics ==
=== Regular season and playoffs ===
			Regular season					Playoffs
Season	Team	League	GP	G	A	Pts	PIM	GP	G	A	Pts	PIM
1998–99	Khimik Voskresensk	RSL	—	—	—	—	—	—	—	—	—	—
1999–2000	Khimik Voskresensk	RUS.2	13	0	0	0	31	—	—	—	—	—
1999–2000	Khimik–2 Voskresensk	RUS.3	9	1	0	1	16	—	—	—	—	—
1999–2000	CSKA Moscow	RUS.2	11	0	1	1	10	—	—	—	—	—
2000–01	CSKA Moscow	RUS.2	44	2	7	9	89	—	—	—	—	—
2000–01	CSKA–2 Moscow	RUS.3	2	1	1	2	0	—	—	—	—	—
2001–02	CSKA Moscow	RUS.2	56	2	15	17	57	14	0	3	3	10
2002–03	CSKA Moscow	RSL	51	3	2	5	60	—	—	—	—	—
2003–04	CSKA Moscow	RSL	54	3	3	6	46	—	—	—	—	—
2003–04	CSKA–2 Moscow	RUS.3	1	0	0	0	0	—	—	—	—	—
2004–05	CSKA Moscow	RSL	60	1	5	6	105	—	—	—	—	—
2005–06	CSKA Moscow	RSL	51	5	5	10	110	7	0	0	0	6
2006–07	Iowa Stars	AHL	9	1	6	7	24	—	—	—	—	—
2006–07	Khimik Moscow Oblast	RSL	29	6	5	11	50	9	1	1	2	22
2007–08	Iowa Stars	AHL	7	1	0	1	10	—	—	—	—	—
2007–08	Khimik Moscow Oblast	RSL	27	1	3	4	34	5	1	2	3	8
2008–09	Atlant Moscow Oblast	KHL	45	2	4	6	114	7	2	0	2	25
2009–10	Atlant Moscow Oblast	KHL	51	1	4	5	57	4	1	0	1	4
2010–11	Atlant Moscow Oblast	KHL	49	2	4	6	114	15	2	2	4	31
2011–12	Ak Bars Kazan	KHL	37	0	3	3	44	9	0	0	0	8
2012–13	Ak Bars Kazan	KHL	36	0	6	6	61	18	0	2	2	21
2013–14	Torpedo Nizhny Novgorod	KHL	38	1	3	4	82	7	0	0	0	6
2014–15	Torpedo Nizhny Novgorod	KHL	36	1	2	3	24	—	—	—	—	—
2014–15	Avangard Omsk	KHL	16	2	4	6	8	11	1	0	1	16
2015–16	Torpedo Nizhny Novgorod	KHL	31	3	2	5	49	—	—	—	—	—
2016–17	HC Sochi	KHL	9	0	0	0	4	—	—	—	—	—
2017–18	HC Sochi	KHL	48	3	5	8	62	3	0	0	0	2
2018–19	HC Sochi	KHL	23	2	0	2	18	2	0	0	0	0
RSL totals			272	19	23	42	405	21	2	3	5	36
KHL totals			419	17	37	54	591	76	6	4	10	113

=== International ===
Year	Team	Event	Result	GP	G	A	Pts	PIM
2006	Russia	WC	5th	7	0	3	3	2
Senior totals				7	0	3	3	2
