= Igor Karpenko =

Ukrainian ice hockey player (born 1976)

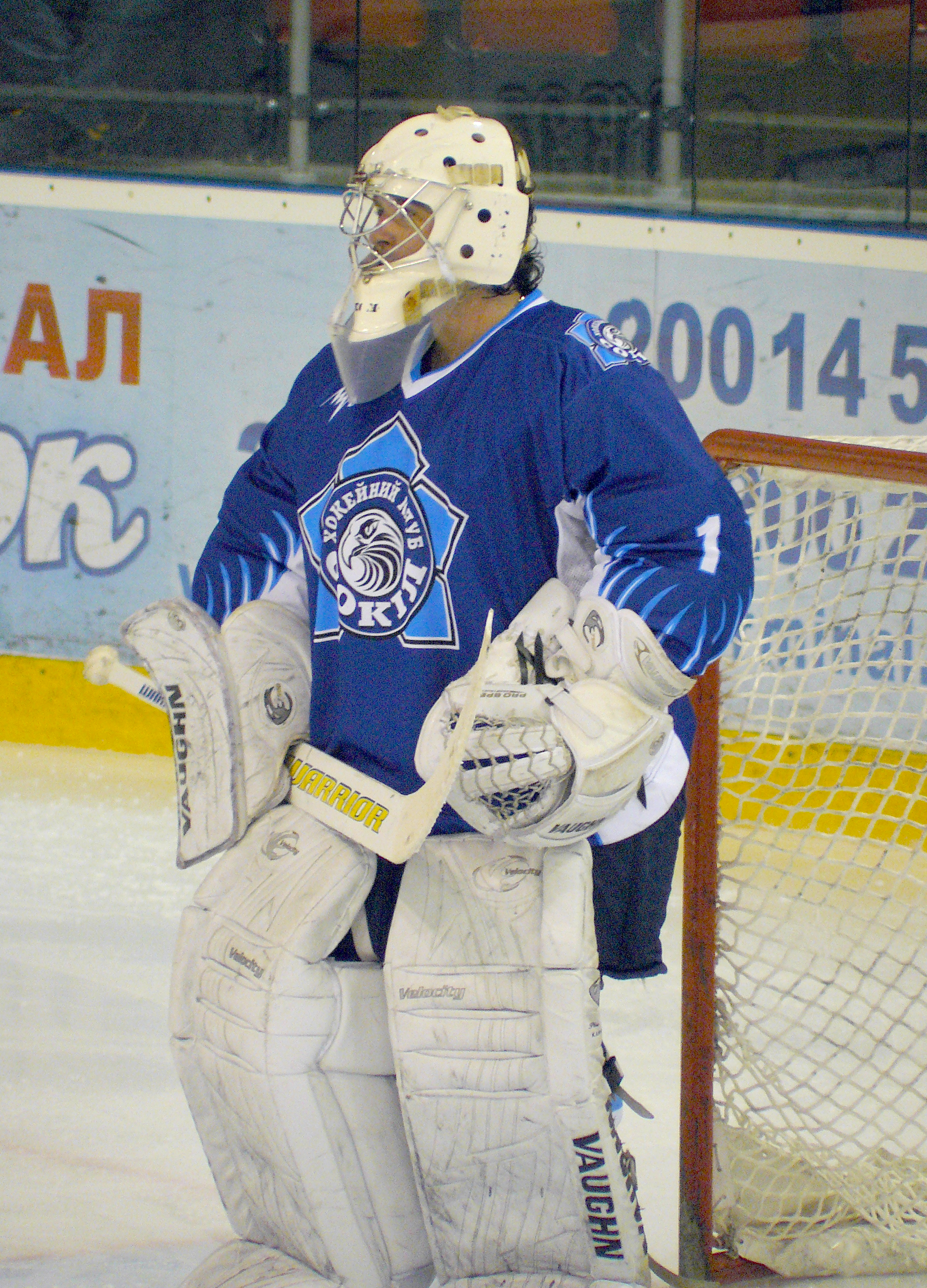
- Born: July 23, 1976 (age 49) Kiev, Ukrainian SSR, Soviet Union
- Height: 5 ft 8 in (173 cm)
- Weight: 187 lb (85 kg; 13 st 5 lb)
- Position: Goaltender
- Caught: Left
- PHL team Former teams: Sokil Kyiv; Port Huron Border Cats; Las Vegas Thunder; Saint John Flames; Johnstown Chiefs; Metallurg Magnitogorsk; HC MVD; HC Dinamo Minsk
- National team: Ukraine
- NHL draft: 185th overall, 1995; Mighty Ducks of Anaheim
- Playing career: 1994–2013

Igor Vasilovich Karpenko (Ігор Васильович Карпенко, Ihor Vasylyovych Karpenko; born July 23 1976) is a Ukrainian former professional ice hockey goaltender who last played for Sokil Kyiv of the Professional Hockey League. He was selected 185th overall by the Mighty Ducks of Anaheim in the 1995 NHL entry draft and spent one season in North America playing for minor league teams. However the majority of his career was spent in Europe, playing for teams in Belarus, Russia, and Ukraine. Internationally Karpenko represented Ukraine in multiple World Championships both at the junior and senior level, and played in the 2002 Winter Olympics.
