= Valentin Wirz =

Swiss ice hockey player

- Born: September 9, 1981 (age 44) Fribourg, Switzerland
- Height: 6 ft 0 in (183 cm)
- Weight: 198 lb (90 kg; 14 st 2 lb)
- Position: Left wing
- Shoots: Left
- NLA team: SC Bern
- National team: Switzerland
- NHL draft: Undrafted
- Playing career: 1998–present

Valentin Wirz (born September 9, 1981) is a Swiss professional ice hockey player. He is currently playing for the SC Bern of Switzerland's National League A.
