= HKM Rimavská Sobota =

- City: Rimavská Sobota, Slovakia
- League: Slovenská hokejová liga
- Founded: 1995
- Home arena: Rimavská Sobota Ice Stadium
- Colours: Red, white, black
- Captain: Vladislav Solomonchak
- Website: www.hkmrs.webnode.sk

HKM Rimavská Sobota is a professional Slovak ice hockey team playing in the Slovenská hokejová liga. They play their games at Rimavská Sobota Ice Stadium in the Slovak town of Rimavská Sobota. The club was founded in 1995.

== Honours ==
=== Domestic ===
Slovak 2. Liga

- (gold) Winners (1): 2022-23
- (silver) Runners-up (2): 2011–12, 2018–19
