= Fredrik Emvall =

Swedish ice hockey player

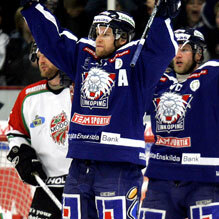
- Born: June 28, 1976 (age 50) Växjö, Sweden
- Height: 6 ft 4 in (193 cm)
- Weight: 212 lb (96 kg; 15 st 2 lb)
- Position: Left wing
- Shot: Left
- Played for: Linköpings HC
- National team: Sweden
- Playing career: 1992–2010

Karl Arne Fredrik Emvall (born June 28, 1976) is a Swedish former professional ice hockey player. He played most of his career as a forward in Linköpings HC, where he's been alternate captain (2003–2007) and even captain for one season (2007–2008).

Emvall announced his retirement on May 6, 2010. He served as the general manager for Linköpings HC from the 2014–15 season through to the 2018–19 season.
