= Andrej Kollár (ice hockey, born 1977) =

Slovak ice hockey player

- Born: 12 January 1977 (age 48); Topoľčany, Czechoslovakia
- Height: 6 ft 5 in (196 cm)
- Weight: 225 lb (102 kg; 16 st 1 lb)
- Position: Forward
- Shot: Left
- Played for: HK Poprad; HC Slovan Bratislava; HK 36 Skalica; HK Nitra; HK Dukla Trenčín; PSG Berani Zlín
- National team: Slovakia
- NHL draft: Undrafted
- Playing career: 1995–2011

Andrej Kollár (born 12 January 1977) is a Slovak former professional ice hockey player.

== Career ==
Kollár played in the Slovak Extraliga for HK Poprad, HC Slovan Bratislava, HK 36 Skalica, HK Nitra and HK Dukla Trenčín. He also played in the Czech Extraliga for PSG Berani Zlín.

After retiring, he worked as general manager for Dukla Trenčín from 2011 to 2013.

== Career statistics ==
			Regular season					Playoffs
Season	Team	League	GP	G	A	Pts	PIM	GP	G	A	Pts	PIM
1995–96	HC VTJ Telvis Topoľčany	Slovak2	51	17	10	27	38	—	—	—	—	—
1996–97	HC VTJ Telvis Topoľčany	Slovak2	37	12	16	28	101	—	—	—	—	—
1997–98	HC VTJ Telvis Topoľčany	Slovak2	42	17	22	39	72	—	—	—	—	—
1998–99	HC VTJ Telvis Topoľčany	Slovak2	34	20	17	37	26	—	—	—	—	—
1999–00	HC VTJ Telvis Topoľčany	Slovak2	43	31	31	62	100	—	—	—	—	—
2000–01	HC SKP Poprad	Slovak	30	12	6	18	32	—	—	—	—	—
2000–01	HC Slovan Bratislava	Slovak	25	4	5	9	6	—	—	—	—	—
2001–02	HC Slovan Bratislava	Slovak	47	8	19	27	55	16	4	4	8	12
2002–03	HC Slovan Bratislava	Slovak	3	0	0	0	2	—	—	—	—	—
2002–03	HK SKP Poprad	Slovak	45	9	19	28	102	—	—	—	—	—
2003–04	HK 36 Skalica	Slovak	52	16	11	27	100	—	—	—	—	—
2004–05	HK Nitra	Slovak	25	2	7	9	18	—	—	—	—	—
2005–06	HK Nitra	Slovak	50	9	31	40	113	13	5	1	6	55
2006–07	HK Dukla Trencin	Slovak	36	14	16	30	26	14	2	8	10	41
2006–07	HK 95 Povazska Bystrica	Slovak2	1	0	0	0	0	—	—	—	—	—
2007–08	HK Dukla Trencin	Slovak	49	26	19	45	160	14	5	12	17	49
2008–09	PSG Zlin	Czech	51	12	14	26	30	5	1	2	3	4
2009–10	PSG Zlin	Czech	19	1	6	7	24	—	—	—	—	—
2009–10	HK Dukla Trencin	Slovak	28	10	12	22	44	—	—	—	—	—
2010–11	HK Dukla Trencin	Slovak	12	3	3	6	16	—	—	—	—	—
2010–11	HK Nitra	Slovak	12	2	7	9	4	—	—	—	—	—
Slovak totals			414	115	155	270	678	61	16	26	42	163
