= Cornwall Nationals =

- City: Cornwall, Ontario
- League: Federal Hockey League
- Founded: 2016
- Folded: 2018
- Home arena: Ed Lumley Arena
- Colours: Black, red, white, gold
- Owner(s): Rodney Rivette & Will Beauvais
- General manager: Basem Awwad
- Head coach: Joel Trottier
- Media: Cornwall Standard Freeholder

Franchise history
- 2016–2018: Cornwall Nationals

The Cornwall Nationals were a minor league professional ice hockey team in the Federal Hockey League (FHL) that played in the 2016–17 season and folded during the 2017–18 season. Based in Cornwall, Ontario, the Nationals played their home games at the Ed Lumley Arena.

== History ==
The Nationals were founded in September 2016, when the Cornwall River Kings of the Ligue Nord-Américaine de Hockey (LNAH) folded just prior to the 2016–17 season. The team was led by general manager Mitch Gagne and team president Rodney Rivette. Prior to creating the Nationals, Rivette led a last-minute fundraising campaign to save the River Kings but did not get enough support in time for the LNAH's deadlines.

On September 14, 2016, the city of Cornwall, Ontario, approved a team called the Cornwall Nationals to begin play for the 2016–17 season out of the Ed Lumley Arena. On September 16, the Federal Hockey League (FHL) approved of the addition to the league for the upcoming season. On September 17, Rivette and Gagne presented the first four players (Lou Dickenson, Jeff Legue, Jason Lepine, and Kris McCarthy) and revealed logo and jerseys.

Midway through their first season, team president Rodney Rivette bought out Mitch Gagne's share of the team and Gagne left his position of general manager on 18 December. On December 21, the Nationals announced that it had secured another local investor, Will Beauvais, to help support the team. Nationals forward, Basem Awwad, also took over general manager duties at that time. On February 28, 2017, captain Joel Trottier took over as head coach.

On February 20, 2018, Rivette announced that the team folded during the season and were unable to continue citing lack of spectators and income, despite the team sitting in second place in the league standings. Their last game was played on February 17 in a 13–6 win against the North Shore Knights in front of a crowd of 358.
