= Chad Wiseman =

Canadian ice hockey player and coach

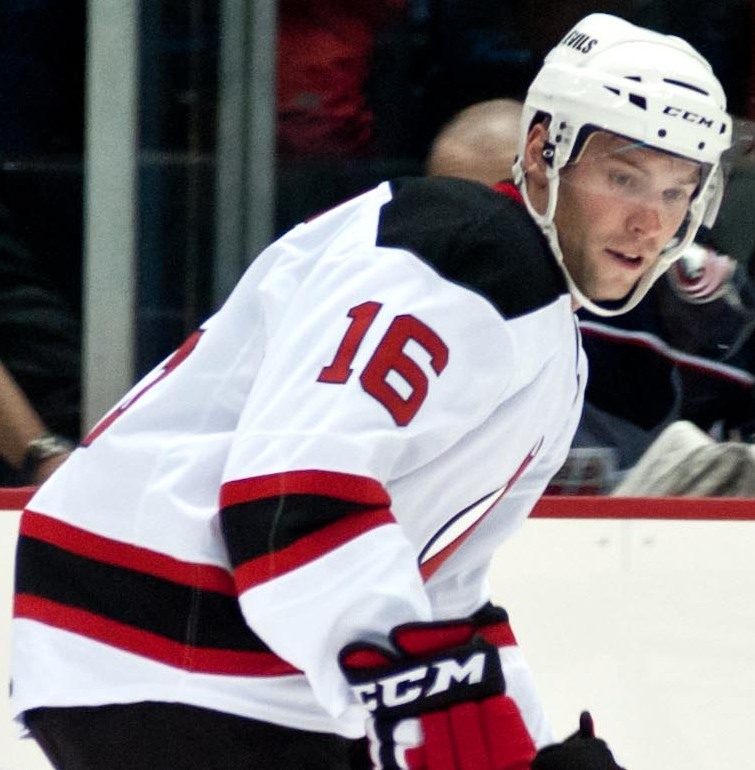
- Wiseman with the Albany Devils in 2011
- Born: March 25, 1981 (age 45) Burlington, Ontario, Canada
- Height: 6 ft 1 in (185 cm)
- Weight: 209 lb (95 kg; 14 st 13 lb)
- Position: Left wing
- Shot: Left
- Played for: San Jose Sharks; New York Rangers; Grizzly Adams Wolfsburg; Nippon Paper Cranes
- NHL draft: 246th overall, 2000; San Jose Sharks
- Playing career: 2001–2014

Chad Wiseman (born March 25, 1981) is a Canadian professional ice hockey coach and former player. As a player, he played 9 games in the National Hockey League (NHL) for the San Jose Sharks and New York Rangers between 2003 and 2005. After retiring in 2015, he became the head coach and general manager of the New York/Metropolitan Riveters of the National Women's Hockey League from 2015 to 2018. He was the head coach for the Guelph Storm of the Ontario Hockey League from 2022 to 2024.

== Biography ==
Wiseman was born in Burlington, Ontario. As a youth, he played in the 1995 Quebec International Pee-Wee Hockey Tournament with a minor ice hockey team from Wexford, Toronto.

=== Junior hockey ===
Wiseman was drafted in the third round, 42nd overall, by the newly formed expansion team, the Mississauga IceDogs of the Ontario Hockey League, in the 1998 OHL Priority Selection.

Wiseman played in his first OHL game on September 25, 1998, as he was held off the scoresheet in a 10–0 loss to the Kingston Frontenacs. In his next game, Wiseman earned his first career OHL point, an assist on the first ever goal scored by the IceDogs in franchise history, scored by Lou Dickenson, in a 6–1 loss to the Peterborough Petes. Wiseman scored his first career OHL goal on October 25, scoring against Ben Vanderklok of the Barrie Colts in a 7–4 loss. On November 1, Wiseman recorded his first career multi-point game, scoring a goal and earning an assist in a 4–4 tie against the Windsor Spitfires. On December 20, Wiseman scored a goal and added three assists for his first career four point game, however, the IceDogs lost to the Sudbury Wolves 8–7 in overtime. Wiseman finished the 1998–99 season scoring 11 goals and adding 25 assists for 36 points in 64 games, ranking him third in team scoring.

Wiseman came back for a second season with the IceDogs in 1999–00, where he saw his offensive numbers improve. On September 25, Wiseman had his first career two goal game, as he also added an assist, in a 3–2 win over the Belleville Bulls. He finished the season leading the IceDogs in scoring, as Wiseman scored 23 goals and 68 points in 68 games.

Wiseman began the 2000–01 season with the IceDogs. On October 6, he recorded his second career four-point game, as Wiseman had a goal and three assists in 6–5 loss to the Barrie Colts. Just over three weeks later, Wiseman again had a four-point game, scoring a goal and three assists in a 7–4 loss to the London Knights. Just after the OHL Christmas break, Wiseman was traded to the Plymouth Whalers. In 30 games with the IceDogs, Wiseman scored 15 goals and 44 points.

Wiseman was traded to the Plymouth Whalers midway through the 2000–01 season. On December 29, played in his first game with the Whalers, scoring two goals against Ryan Aschaber, as Plymouth defeated the Windsor Spitfires 3–1. Overall, in 32 games with the Whalers, Wiseman scored 11 goals and 27 points, helping the club finish in first place in the West Division. On March 24, Wiseman played in his first career OHL post-season game, scoring a goal against Robert Gherson of the Sarnia Sting in an 8–4 victory. In 19 playoff games, Wiseman led the Whalers with 12 goals, and added eight assists for 20 points, as Plymouth lost to the Ottawa 67's in the J. Ross Robertson Cup finals in six games.

=== Professional career ===
==== San Jose Sharks (2000–2003) ====
Wiseman was drafted in the ninth round, 246th overall by the San Jose Sharks in the 2000 NHL entry draft held at the Pengrowth Saddledome in Calgary, Alberta.

Following his junior hockey career, Wiseman joined the Sharks American Hockey League affiliate, the Cleveland Barons in the 2001–02 season. In 76 games with Cleveland, Wiseman scored 21 goals and 50 points, finishing third in team scoring.

Wiseman returned to the Barons for the 2002–03 season, where he appeared in 77 games, scoring 17 goals and 52 points, which ranked him second in team scoring. In March 2003, Wiseman was called up to the National Hockey League and made his NHL debut on March 4 against the Edmonton Oilers, as he was held with no points in a 2–1 loss. In four NHL games during the 2002–03 season, Wiseman had no points.

On August 12, 2003, Wiseman was traded to the New York Rangers for Nils Ekman.

==== New York Rangers (2003–2006) ====
Wiseman spent the majority of the 2003–04 with the Rangers American Hockey League affiliate, the Hartford Wolf Pack. In 62 games with the Wolf Pack, Wiseman led the team in scoring with 25 goals and 52 points in 62 games. In the post-season, Wiseman scored a team high five goals and 11 points in 15 games, as Hartford lost to the Wilkes-Barre/Scranton Penguins in the Eastern Conference finals.

Wiseman earned a brief call-up to the New York Rangers and played in his first game with New York on January 8, 2004, as he was held with no points in a 3–2 loss against the Carolina Hurricanes. On January 15, Wiseman scored his first career NHL goal and point, scoring against Martin Brodeur of the New Jersey Devils in the third period of a 3–3 tie. In four games with the Rangers in 2003–04, Wiseman scored one goal.

In 2004–05, Wiseman appeared in 60 games with the Wolf Pack, scoring 17 goals and 33 points. In six playoff games, Wiseman scored a goal and two points.

Wiseman returned to Hartford for the 2005–06 season, as in 69 games, he scored 19 goals and 55 points, helping the club reach the post-season. In 11 playoff games, Wiseman scored three goals and nine points. Wiseman also played in one game with the Rangers during the 2005–06 regular season, as he earned an assist. Wiseman also played in his first career post-season game with New York, as he had no points in a 4–1 loss to the New Jersey Devils.

==== Washington Capitals (2006–2007) ====
On July 14, 2006, Wiseman signed a one-year, two-way contract with the Washington Capitals. Wiseman would spend the 2006–07 with the Capitals American Hockey League affiliate, the Hershey Bears. In 48 games with the Bears, Wiseman scored 15 goals and 35 points. In the post-season, Wiseman scored two goals and eight points in 16 games, as Hershey lost to the Hamilton Bulldogs in the Calder Cup finals.

==== EHC Wolfsburg Grizzly Adams (2007–2008) ====
On July 9, 2007, Wiseman signed a one-year contract with EHC Wolfsburg Grizzly Adams of the Deutsche Eishockey Liga in Germany. In 28 games during the 2007–08 season, Wiseman scored 10 goals and 23 points, though Wolfsburg failed to qualify for the playoffs.

==== New Jersey Devils (2008–2009) ====
On July 17, 2008, Wiseman signed a one-year, two-way contract with the New Jersey Devils. Wiseman would play with the Lowell Devils in the 2008–09 season, scoring nine goals and 19 points in an injury plagued season, as he appeared in only 23 games.

==== Springfield Falcons (2009–2010) ====
Wiseman signed with the Springfield Falcons of the American Hockey League for the 2009–10 season. On January 17, Wiseman scored four goals and six points in a 6–3 win over the Wilkes-Barre/Scranton Penguins. In 67 games, Wiseman scored 24 goals and 59 points, finishing second in team scoring.

==== New Jersey Devils (2010–2013) ====
On July 28, 2010, Wiseman signed a two-year, two-way contract worth $1.05 million with the New Jersey Devils. Wiseman spent the entire season in 2010–11 season with the Albany Devils of the American Hockey League, as he scored 16 goals and 44 points in 48 games. On March 9, Wiseman scored four goals in 9:03, setting a franchise record for goals in a period and tying the record for goals in a game, as Albany defeated the Bridgeport Sound Tigers 5–4.

Wiseman returned to Albany for the 2011–12 season, as he scored five goals and 19 points in 37 games. Following the season, Wiseman signed a one-year AHL contract with the club.

In 2012–13, Wiseman scored three goals and 13 points in 36 games with Albany.

==== Östersunds IK (2013–2014) ====
Wiseman joined Östersunds IK of Division 1, the third-tier league in Sweden. In 23 games, Wiseman scored 11 goals and 30 points, finishing third in team scoring. In four playoff games, Wiseman had a goal and three points.

==== Nippon Paper Cranes (2014–2015) ====
Wiseman played with the Nippon Paper Cranes of the Asia League Ice Hockey for the 2014–15 season. In 36 games, Wiseman scored 14 goals and 29 points.

Following the season, Wiseman announced his retirement from hockey.

== Coaching career ==
=== New York Riveters (2015–2018) ===
On August 4, 2015, Wiseman became the head coach for the New York Riveters of the National Women's Hockey League (NWHL) in the league's inaugural season. In their first season in 2015–16, the Riveters finished in last place in the NWHL with a 4–12–2 record, earning 10 points. In the post-season, New York lost to the Boston Pride in two games.

Wiseman remained the head coach of the Riveters and took on general manager duties in the 2016–17 season. New York finished in second place in the league with a 8–7–3 record, earning 19 points. In the playoffs, the Riveters lost to the Buffalo Beauts in the league semi-finals.

The club rebranded as the Metropolitan Riveters in the 2017–18 season. Wiseman led the Riveters to a league best 13–3–0 record, earning 26 points. In the playoffs, Metropolitan defeated the Connecticut Whale 5–0 in the semi-final game, earning a berth to the Isobel Cup. In the final game, Metropolitan shut out the Buffalo Beauts 1–0 to win the championship.

Following the season, Wiseman stepped down as head coach of the Riveters.

==== Burlington Cougars (2018) ====
Following the championship season with the Riveters, he returned to his hometown to coach the Burlington Cougars of the Ontario Junior Hockey League. for the 2018–19 season. However, prior to coaching any games for the Cougars, he was named an assistant coach for the Guelph Storm in the major junior Ontario Hockey League.

==== Guelph Storm (2018–2024) ====
Wiseman joined the Guelph Storm of the Ontario Hockey League as an assistant coach under head coach George Burnett. In the 2018–19 season, Guelph finished with a 40–18–6–4 record, earning 90 points and fourth place in the Western Conference. The Storm would win the J. Ross Robertson Cup, as they defeated the Ottawa 67's in six games in the championship round, earning a berth into the 2019 Memorial Cup. At the Memorial Cup, Guelph lost to the Rouyn-Noranda Huskies 6–4 in the semi-final game.

Wiseman returned to the Storm for the 2019–20 season as he was promoted to an associate coach, as Guelph finished the season with a 32–23–3–5 record, earning 72 points and sixth place in the Western Conference. Due to COVID-19, the post-season was cancelled.

Due to the COVID-19 pandemic, the 2020–21 OHL season was cancelled.

In 2021–22, Wiseman returned as an associate coach with the Storm. Guelph finished the season with a 36–24–5–3 record, earning 80 points and fifth place in the Western Conference. In the post-season, the Storm lost in the conference quarter-finals.

The Storm named Scott Walker as head coach for the 2022–23 season, as Burnett stepped down to focus on general manager duties. Wiseman remained the associate coach of the club. After two games, Walker stepped down as head coach due to health issues, and Wiseman took over head coaching duties. On October 7, Wiseman coached his first game as head coach of the Storm, as they lost 5–3 to the Flint Firebirds. The next night, on October 8, Wiseman earned his first career OHL coaching victory as Guelph defeated the Niagara IceDogs 5–2. Under Wiseman, the Storm had a record of 35–27–4, as the club finished in second place in the Midwest Division and sixth in the Western Conference. In the playoffs, Guelph lost to the Sarnia Sting in six games in the conference quarter-finals.

Wiseman returned to the Storm for the 2023-24 season. Guelph finished the season with a 33-28-7 record, earning 73 points and fourth place in the Midwest Division, sixth overall in the Western Conference. In the post-season, the Storm were swept by the Sault Ste. Marie Greyhounds in four games in the conference quarter-finals.

Following the season, the Storm relieved Wiseman of his duties.

== Career statistics ==
| | | | Regular season | | | | | Playoffs |
| Season | Team | League | GP | G | A | Pts | PIM | GP | G | A | Pts | PIM |
|---|---|---|---|---|---|---|---|---|---|---|---|---|
| 1997–98 | Burlington Cougars | OPJHL | 50 | 28 | 36 | 64 | 31 | — | — | — | — | — |
| 1998–99 | Mississauga IceDogs | OHL | 64 | 11 | 25 | 36 | 29 | — | — | — | — | — |
| 1999–00 | Mississauga IceDogs | OHL | 68 | 23 | 45 | 68 | 53 | — | — | — | — | — |
| 2000–01 | Mississauga IceDogs | OHL | 30 | 15 | 29 | 44 | 22 | — | — | — | — | — |
| 2000–01 | Plymouth Whalers | OHL | 32 | 11 | 16 | 27 | 12 | 19 | 12 | 8 | 20 | 22 |
| 2001–02 | Cleveland Barons | AHL | 76 | 21 | 29 | 50 | 61 | — | — | — | — | — |
| 2002–03 | Cleveland Barons | AHL | 77 | 17 | 35 | 52 | 44 | — | — | — | — | — |
| 2002–03 | San Jose Sharks | NHL | 4 | 0 | 0 | 0 | 4 | — | — | — | — | — |
| 2003–04 | Hartford Wolf Pack | AHL | 62 | 25 | 27 | 52 | 45 | 15 | 5 | 6 | 11 | 12 |
| 2003–04 | New York Rangers | NHL | 4 | 1 | 0 | 1 | 0 | — | — | — | — | — |
| 2004–05 | Hartford Wolf Pack | AHL | 60 | 17 | 16 | 33 | 74 | 6 | 1 | 1 | 2 | 6 |
| 2005–06 | Hartford Wolf Pack | AHL | 69 | 19 | 36 | 55 | 65 | 11 | 3 | 6 | 9 | 22 |
| 2005–06 | New York Rangers | NHL | 1 | 0 | 1 | 1 | 4 | 1 | 0 | 0 | 0 | 2 |
| 2006–07 | Hershey Bears | AHL | 48 | 15 | 20 | 35 | 80 | 16 | 2 | 6 | 8 | 16 |
| 2007–08 | Grizzly Adams Wolfsburg | DEL | 28 | 10 | 13 | 23 | 41 | — | — | — | — | — |
| 2008–09 | Lowell Devils | AHL | 23 | 9 | 10 | 19 | 23 | — | — | — | — | — |
| 2009–10 | Springfield Falcons | AHL | 67 | 24 | 35 | 59 | 83 | — | — | — | — | — |
| 2010–11 | Albany Devils | AHL | 48 | 16 | 28 | 44 | 47 | — | — | — | — | — |
| 2011–12 | Albany Devils | AHL | 37 | 5 | 14 | 19 | 11 | — | — | — | — | — |
| 2012–13 | Albany Devils | AHL | 36 | 3 | 10 | 13 | 27 | — | — | — | — | — |
| 2013–14 | Östersunds IK | SWE-3 | 23 | 11 | 19 | 30 | 53 | 4 | 2 | 1 | 3 | 2 |
| 2014–15 | Nippon Paper Cranes | ALH | 36 | 14 | 15 | 29 | 26 | — | — | — | — | — |
| AHL totals | | | 603 | 171 | 260 | 431 | 560 | 48 | 11 | 19 | 30 | 56 |
| NHL totals | | | 9 | 1 | 1 | 2 | 8 | 1 | 0 | 0 | 0 | 2 |

== Coaching record ==
=== OHL ===
| Team | Year | Regular season | | | | | | Postseason |
| Team | Year | G | W | L | OTL | Pts | Finish | Result |
|---|---|---|---|---|---|---|---|---|
| Guelph Storm | 2022–23 | 66 | 35 | 27 | 4 | 74 | 2nd in Midwest | Lost in conference quarter-finals (2–4 vs. SAR) |
| Guelph Storm | 2023–24 | 68 | 33 | 28 | 7 | 73 | 4th in Midwest | Lost in conference quarter-finals (0–4 vs. SOO) |
| OHL totals | 2022–2024 | 134 | 68 | 55 | 11 | 147 | 0 Division titles | 0 J. Ross Robertson Cups – (2–8, 0.200) |

=== NWHL ===
| Team | Year | Regular season | | | | | | Postseason |
| Team | Year | G | W | L | OTL | Pts | Finish | Result |
|---|---|---|---|---|---|---|---|---|
| New York Riveters | 2015–16 | 18 | 4 | 12 | 2 | 10 | 4th in NWHL | Lost in league semi-finals (0–2 vs. BOS) |
| New York Riveters | 2016–17 | 18 | 8 | 7 | 3 | 19 | 2nd in NWHL | Lost in league semi-finals (2–4 vs. BUF) |
| Metropolitan Riveters | 2017–18 | 16 | 13 | 3 | 0 | 26 | 1st in NWHL | Won in league semi-finals (5–0 vs. CON); Won Isobel Cup (1–0 vs. BUF) |
| NWHL totals | 2015–2018 | 52 | 25 | 22 | 5 | 55 | 1 Regular season title | 1 Isobel Cup |
