= Windsor Wild =

- City: Windsor, Quebec
- League: LNAH
- Founded: 2011
- Folded: 2012
- Colors: Red, green
- General manager: Jean-François Labbé
- Head coach: Éric Dandenault

Franchise history
- 1996 to 2001: Windsor Papetiers
- 2001 to 2003: Windsor Lacroix
- 2003 to 2011: Sherbrooke Saint-François
- 2011 to 12: Windsor Wild
- 2012-16: Cornwall River Kings

Championships
- Regular season titles: None
- Division titles: None

The Windsor Wild were an ice hockey team based in Windsor, Quebec that played in the Ligue Nord-Américaine de Hockey (LNAH). Formerly the Sherbrooke Saint-François, the Wild played in the LNAH during the 2011-12 season. They moved to Cornwall, Ontario following the season.
