= St. Clair Shores Fighting Saints =

Sports team

- City: St. Clair Shores, Michigan
- League: Federal Hockey League
- Founded: 2016
- Home arena: St. Clair Shores Civic Arena
- Colors: Blue, green, gold, white
- Owner: Global Hockey Management (Michael Kolarik)
- General manager: Brandon Contratto
- Head coach: Dave Debol
- Media: St. Clair Shores Sentinel; The Macomb Daily; Michigan Regional Sports Network

Franchise history
- 2016–2017: St. Clair Shores Fighting Saints
- 2017–2018: North Shore Knights

The St. Clair Shores Fighting Saints were a minor professional ice hockey team in the Federal Hockey League that began play in the 2016–17 season based in St. Clair Shores, Michigan. The Fighting Saints played their home games at the St. Clair Shores Civic Arena during their first season. In their second season, they relocated to Kingsville, Ontario, as the North Shore Knights and played home games in several other cities in Ontario and Quebec.

== History ==
On April 20, 2016, it was announced that St. Clair Shores had landed an FHL team to begin play for the 2016–17 season at the Civic Arena. On May 10, it was announced that Brandon Contratto would be the general manager, Michael Kolarik of Global Hockey Management would run the team, and St. Clair Shores native and former Hartford Whalers player Dave Debol would serve as head coach.

On May 18, the Fighting Saints name, logo, colors and jerseys were announced.

When the schedule was released for the 2017–18 season, the Fighting Saints were listed with home games in Gravenhurst, Ontario, Témiscaming, Quebec, South River, Ontario, and Kingsville, Ontario. The team was later announced to have relocated to Kingsville as the North Shore Knights.
