= Cornwall Civic Complex =

Multi-purpose sports facility in Cornwall, Canada

- Interactive map of Cornwall Civic Complex
- Address: 100 Water Street East
- Location: Cornwall, Ontario, Canada
- Owner: City of Cornwall
- Operator: City of Cornwall
- Capacity: Concerts: 5,700; Ice hockey: 3,983 (1976–2008); 4,639 (2008–present); Theatre: 2,000
- Surface: 200 feet (61 m) x 85 feet (26 m) (Ed Lumley Arena)
- Record attendance: 4,018 (Game 7 of 1996 Bogart Cup Final)

Construction
- Opened: 1976
- Renovated: 2005, 2008

Tenants
- Cornwall Royals (QMJHL/OHL) (1976–1992); Cornwall Colts (CCHL) (1992–1997, 2007–present); Cornwall Aces (AHL) (1993–1996); Cornwall Comets (LHSPAA) (2004–2006); Cornwall River Kings (LNAH) (2012–2016); Cornwall Nationals (FHL) (2016–2018)

Website
- https://www.cornwall.ca/en/play-here/civic-complex.aspx

Cornwall Civic Complex is a sports facility located in Cornwall, Ontario, Canada. The complex contains an NHL-sized rink named the Ed Lumley Arena that was built in 1976. The complex also features a swimming pool which was opened in September 2005. The Ed Lumley Arena is the home of the Cornwall Colts of the Central Canada Hockey League (CCHL).

== History of the Ed Lumley Arena ==
The Ed Lumley Arena was built along with the building in 1976, and it previously held 3,983 seats. The seating capacity was increased to 4,639 in 2008 when the city decided to finish the lower bowl section in the arena at the same time the complex was renovated.

It was once home to several former ice hockey teams including the Cornwall Royals of the Quebec Major Junior Hockey League (QMJHL) and Ontario Hockey League (OHL), the Cornwall Aces of the American Hockey League (AHL), the Cornwall River Kings of the Ligue Nord-Américaine de Hockey (LNAH), and the Cornwall Nationals of the Federal Prospects Hockey League (FPHL). In May 2008, the Ed Lumley Arena was host to the Royal Bank Cup.

The largest crowd recorded at the arena was during Game 7 of the 1996 Bogart Cup Final, when a crowd of more than 4,000 people saw the Cornwall Colts defeating the Gloucester Rangers 4–3 to win the Bogart Cup at home.

The Cornwall Civic Complex has also hosted such concerts as country legend Charley Pride, Canadian rockers Nickelback, Bryan Adams, and Rush, as well as other Canadian acts Great Big Sea, Celine Dion, Rita MacNeil, Barenaked Ladies, Hedley, Lights, and These Kids Wear Crowns. Legendary rocker Alice Cooper performed at the Cornwall Civic Complex in October 2006. It has also held many WWE wrestling events and boxing events.

== The restaurant/bar inside the complex ==
The complex had a restaurant/bar inside, on the southwest side of the building. The first restaurant was called The Blue Room during the days of the Royals. It was then changed to Resto-Bar Jazzy. After Jazzy closed, it was empty for nearly five years. In 2005, a new sports bar and grill opened up, called Don Cherry's Sports Bar & Grill, a franchise originally owned by former NHL coach and star of Coach's Corner on Hockey Night in Canada, Don Cherry. In April 2009, Don Cherry's was renamed On Tap Sports Bar & Grill, which has since closed.
