= 1996–97 IHL season =

North American ice hockey season

1996-97 IHL season
- League: International Hockey League
- Sport: Ice hockey
- Duration: October 4, 1996 – June 15, 1997
- Games: 82
- Teams: 19

Regular season
- Fred A. Huber Trophy: Detroit Vipers
- Season MVP: Frederic Chabot (Aeros)
- Top scorer: Rob Brown (Wolves)

Playoffs
- Playoffs MVP: Peter Ciavaglia (Vipers)

Turner Cup
- Champions: Detroit Vipers
- Runners-up: Long Beach Ice Dogs

Seasons
- ← 1995–96 1997–98 →

The 1996–97 IHL season was the 52nd season of the International Hockey League, a North American minor professional league. 19 teams participated in the regular season, and the Detroit Vipers won the Turner Cup.

== Offseason ==
The Atlanta Knights relocated to Quebec to become the Quebec Rafales due to the Omni being demolished to make room for Philips Arena.

The Peoria Rivermen organization left the IHL and joined the ECHL. The IHL franchise relocated to San Antonio to become the San Antonio Dragons.

After the Winnipeg Jets relocation to Phoenix to become the Phoenix Coyotes, the Phoenix Roadrunners competed for fans. The Minnesota Moose were purchased by a group by Canadian businessmen and relocated to Winnipeg, Manitoba to become the Manitoba Moose to provide a new tenant at Winnipeg Arena and keeping pro hockey in the city.

The Los Angeles Ice Dogs relocated to Long Beach retaining the same name due to poor attendance.

The San Francisco Spiders folded due to bankruptcy, low attendance, even though on weekends and holidays did very well, and issues with Cow Palace.

== Regular season ==
=== Eastern Conference ===
Central	GP	W	L	SOL	GF	GA	Pts
Indianapolis Ice	82	44	29	9	289	230	97
Cleveland Lumberjacks	82	40	32	10	286	280	90
Michigan K-Wings	82	31	44	7	208	272	69
Fort Wayne Komets	82	28	47	7	223	318	63

North	GP	W	L	SOL	GF	GA	Pts
Detroit Vipers	82	57	17	8	280	188	122
Orlando Solar Bears	82	53	24	5	305	232	111
Cincinnati Cyclones	82	43	29	10	254	248	96
Québec Rafales	82	41	30	11	267	248	93
Grand Rapids Griffins	82	40	30	12	244	246	92

=== Western Conference ===
Midwest	GP	W	L	SOL	GF	GA	Pts
San Antonio Dragons	82	45	30	7	276	278	97
Kansas City Blades	82	38	29	15	271	270	91
Chicago Wolves	82	40	36	6	276	290	86
Milwaukee Admirals	82	38	36	8	253	298	84
Manitoba Moose	82	32	40	10	262	300	74

South	GP	W	L	SOL	GF	GA	Pts
Long Beach Ice Dogs	82	54	19	9	309	247	117
Houston Aeros	82	44	30	8	247	228	96
Utah Grizzlies	82	43	33	6	259	254	92
Las Vegas Thunder	82	41	34	7	287	299	89
Phoenix Roadrunners	82	27	42	13	239	309	67

== Turner Cup playoffs ==
First round
E1	Detroit	3
E8	Michigan	1
E4	Cincinnati	0
E5	Quebec	3
E2	Orlando	3
E7	Grand Rapids	2
E3	Indianapolis	1
E6	Cleveland	3
W1	Long Beach	3
W8	Milwaukee	0
W4	Utah	3
W5	Kansas City	0
W2	San Antonio	3
W7	Chicago	1
W3	Houston	3
W6	Las Vegas	0

Quarterfinals
E1	Detroit	4
E5	Québec	2
E2	Orlando	1
E6	Cleveland	4
W1	Long Beach	4
W4	Utah	0
W2	San Antonio	1
W3	Houston	4

Semifinals
E1	Detroit	4
E6	Cleveland	1
W1	Long Beach	4
W3	Houston	1

Turner Cup Finals
E1	Detroit	4
W1	Long Beach	2

=== First round ===
==== (E1) Detroit Vipers vs. (E8) Michigan K-Wings ====
April 17	Michigan K-Wings	4–3	Detroit Vipers	The Palace of Auburn Hills

April 21	Michigan K-Wings	1–4	Detroit Vipers	The Palace of Auburn Hills

April 25	Detroit Vipers	4–3	OT	Michigan K-Wings	Wings Stadium

April 26	Detroit Vipers	4–1	Michigan K-Wings	Wings Stadium

Detroit won series 3–1

==== (W1) Long Beach Ice Dogs vs. (W8) Milwaukee Admirals ====
April 18	Milwaukee Admirals	5–6	Long Beach Ice Dogs	Long Beach Sports Arena

April 20	Milwaukee Admirals	3–4	OT	Long Beach Ice Dogs	Long Beach Sports Arena

April 25	Long Beach Ice Dogs	1–0	OT	Milwaukee Admirals	Bradley Center

Long Beach won series 3–0

==== (E2) Orlando Solar Bears vs. (E7) Grand Rapids Griffins ====
April 17	Grand Rapids Griffins	3–1	Orlando Solar Bears	Orlando Arena

April 21	Grand Rapids Griffins	5–4	OT	Orlando Solar Bears	Orlando Arena

April 23	Orlando Solar Bears	4–1	Grand Rapids Griffins	Van Andel Arena

April 26	Orlando Solar Bears	2–1	Grand Rapids Griffins	Van Andel Arena

April 28	Grand Rapids Griffins	2–3	Orlando Solar Bears	Orlando Arena

Orlando won series 3–2

==== (W2) San Antonio Dragons vs. (W7) Chicago Wolves ====
April 18	Chicago Wolves	3–5	San Antonio Dragons	Freeman Coliseum

April 20	Chicago Wolves	4–3	OT	San Antonio Dragons	Freeman Coliseum

April 23	San Antonio Dragons	3–2	Chicago Wolves	Rosemont Horizon

April 24	San Antonio Dragons	3–2	OT	Chicago Wolves	Rosemont Horizon

San Antonio won series 3–1

==== (E3) Indianapolis Ice vs. (E6) Cleveland Lumberjacks ====
April 18	Cleveland Lumberjacks	3–6	Indianapolis Ice	Pepsi Coliseum

April 19	Cleveland Lumberjacks	6–3	Indianapolis Ice	Pepsi Coliseum

April 24	Indianapolis Ice	1–2	Cleveland Lumberjacks	Gund Arena

April 26	Indianapolis Ice	2–3	OT	Cleveland Lumberjacks	Gund Arena

Cleveland won series 3–1

==== (W3) Houston Aeros vs. (W6) Las Vegas Thunder ====
April 19	Las Vegas Thunder	2–4	Houston Aeros	The Summit

April 20	Las Vegas Thunder	2–4	Houston Aeros	The Summit

April 25	Houston Aeros	1–0	Las Vegas Thunder	Thomas & Mack Center

Houston won series 3–0

==== (E4) Cincinnati Cyclones vs. (E5) Québec Rafales ====
April 18	Québec Rafales	2–1	Cincinnati Cyclones	Riverfront Coliseum

April 19	Québec Rafales	7–3	Cincinnati Cyclones	Riverfront Coliseum

April 25	Cincinnati Cyclones	3–4	Québec Rafales	Colisée de Québec

Québec won series 3–0

==== (W4) Utah Grizzlies vs. (W5) Kansas City Blades ====
April 18	Kansas City Blades	0–2	Utah Grizzlies	Delta Center

April 21	Kansas City Blades	3–4	OT	Utah Grizzlies	Delta Center

April 24	Utah Grizzlies	6–2	Kansas City Blades	Kemper Arena

Utah won series 3–0

=== Quarterfinals ===
==== (E1) Detroit Vipers vs. (E5) Quebec Rafales ====
May 1	Québec Rafales	1–3	Detroit Vipers	The Palace of Auburn Hills

May 3	Québec Rafales	3–1	Detroit Vipers	The Palace of Auburn Hills

May 7	Detroit Vipers	2–1	Québec Rafales	Colisée de Québec

May 9	Detroit Vipers	6–3	Québec Rafales	Colisée de Québec

May 10	Detroit Vipers	2–6	Québec Rafales	Colisée de Québec

May 12	Québec Rafales	0–3	Detroit Vipers	The Palace of Auburn Hills

Detroit won series 4–2

==== (W1) Long Beach Ice Dogs vs. (W4) Utah Grizzlies ====
May 2	Utah Grizzlies	1–2	Long Beach Ice Dogs	Long Beach Sports Arena

May 4	Utah Grizzlies	1–4	Long Beach Ice Dogs	Long Beach Sports Arena

May 7	Long Beach Ice Dogs	4–1	Utah Grizzlies	Delta Center

May 9	Long Beach Ice Dogs	3–2	OT	Utah Grizzlies	Delta Center

Long Beach won series 4–0

==== (E2) Orlando Solar Bears vs. (E6) Cleveland Lumberjacks ====
May 2	Cleveland Lumberjacks	5–4	Orlando Solar Bears	Orlando Arena

May 3	Cleveland Lumberjacks	3–2	OT	Orlando Solar Bears	Orlando Arena

May 7	Orlando Solar Bears	3–5	Cleveland Lumberjacks	Gund Arena

May 10	Orlando Solar Bears	3–2	Cleveland Lumberjacks	Gund Arena

May 11	Orlando Solar Bears	4–6	Cleveland Lumberjacks	Gund Arena

Cleveland won series 4–1

==== (W2) San Antonio Dragons vs. (W3) Houston Aeros ====
May 2	Houston Aeros	4–0	San Antonio Dragons	Freeman Coliseum

May 3	Houston Aeros	4–3	OT	San Antonio Dragons	Freeman Coliseum

May 6	San Antonio Dragons	2–5	Houston Aeros	The Summit

May 9	San Antonio Dragons	2–1	Houston Aeros	The Summit

May 10	San Antonio Dragons	3–4	Houston Aeros	The Summit

Houston won series 4–1

=== Semifinals ===
==== (E1) Detroit Vipers vs. (E6) Cleveland Lumberjacks ====
May 16	Cleveland Lumberjacks	2–4	Detroit Vipers	The Palace of Auburn Hills

May 18	Cleveland Lumberjacks	1–4	Detroit Vipers	The Palace of Auburn Hills

May 22	Detroit Vipers	1–3	Cleveland Lumberjacks	Gund Arena

May 24	Detroit Vipers	6–4	Cleveland Lumberjacks	Gund Arena

May 25	Cleveland Lumberjacks	1–3	Detroit Vipers	The Palace of Auburn Hills

Detroit won series 4–1

==== (W1) Long Beach Ice Dogs vs. (W3) Houston Aeros ====
May 15	Long Beach Ice Dogs	1–4	Houston Aeros	The Summit

May 18	Houston Aeros	3–5	Long Beach Ice Dogs	Long Beach Sports Arena

May 19	Houston Aeros	2–5	Long Beach Ice Dogs	Long Beach Sports Arena

May 21	Long Beach Ice Dogs	5–3	Houston Aeros	The Summit

May 22	Long Beach Ice Dogs	4–2	Houston Aeros	The Summit

Long Beach won series 4–1

=== Turner Cup Finals ===
==== (E1) Detroit Vipers vs. (W1) Long Beach Ice Dogs ====
May 30	Long Beach Ice Dogs	3–5	Detroit Vipers	The Palace of Auburn Hills

June 1	Long Beach Ice Dogs	3–0	Detroit Vipers	The Palace of Auburn Hills

June 9	Detroit Vipers	5–1	Long Beach Ice Dogs	Long Beach Sports Arena

June 11	Detroit Vipers	3–1	Long Beach Ice Dogs	Long Beach Sports Arena

June 13	Detroit Vipers	1–2	OT	Long Beach Ice Dogs	Long Beach Sports Arena

June 15	Long Beach Ice Dogs	0–2	Detroit Vipers	The Palace of Auburn Hills

Detroit won series 4–2

== Awards ==
1997 IHL awards
Turner Cup	Detroit Vipers
Fred A. Huber Trophy: (Best regular-season record)	Detroit Vipers
Frank Gallagher Trophy: (Eastern Conference playoff champion)	Detroit Vipers
Ken Ullyot Trophy: (Western Conference playoff champion)	Long Beach Ice Dogs
Comeback Player of the Year Award:	Kevin Smyth, Orlando Solar Bears
Commissioner's Trophy: (Best coach)	John Van Boxmeer, Long Beach Ice Dogs
Gary F. Longman Memorial Trophy: (Best first-year player)	Sergei Samsonov, Detroit Vipers
Governor's Trophy: (Best defenceman)	Brad Werenka, Indianapolis Ice
I. John Snider, II Trophy: (Leadership and humanitarian contribution)	Tim Breslin, Chicago Wolves
Ironman Award: (Best two-way player over 82 games)	Brad Werenka, Indianapolis Ice
James Gatschene Memorial Trophy: (Most valuable player, regular season)	Frederic Chabot, Houston Aeros
James Norris Memorial Trophy: (Goaltenders with fewest goals allowed)	Rich Parent and Jeff Reese, Detroit Vipers
Ken McKenzie Trophy: (Best U.S.-born first-year player)	Brian Felsner, Orlando Solar Bears
Leo P. Lamoureux Memorial Trophy: (Player with most points)	Rob Brown, Chicago Wolves
Norman R. "Bud" Poile Trophy: (Most valuable player, playoffs)	Peter Ciavaglia, Detroit Vipers
