= Cornwall River Kings =

- City: Cornwall, Ontario
- League: LNAH
- Founded: 2012
- Folded: 2016
- Home arena: Cornwall Civic Complex
- Colours: Red, white
- Owners: Steve Moreau, Kim Williams, Kaitlyn Moreau, Courtney Moreau
- General manager: Rick Lalonde
- Head coach: Bob Desjardins
- Captain: Brennan Barker

Franchise history
- 1996–2001: Windsor Papetiers
- 2001–2003: Windsor Lacroix
- 2003–2011: Sherbrooke Saint-François
- 2011–2012: Windsor Wild
- 2012–2016: Cornwall River Kings

Championships
- Regular season titles: None
- Division titles: None

The Cornwall River Kings were a professional ice hockey team based in Cornwall, Ontario, Canada and members of the Ligue Nord-Américaine de Hockey (LNAH). They played their home games at Ed Lumley Arena at the Cornwall Civic Complex. The team was also formerly known as the Windsor Wild of Windsor, Quebec before moving to Cornwall in 2012.

== History ==
=== Year one: 2012–13 ===
The team was purchased in 2012 by Bernard Villeneuve and brought to Cornwall to play in the Cornwall Civic Complex. Led by veterans Yves Sarault and Eric Meloche, Cornwall went 20-17-3 in its first LNAH season, finishing third overall in the regular season. The River Kings were captained by Steve Simons and crowd favourites included Francis Lessard and Tyler Howe. In the first round of the playoffs, the River Kings eliminated St-Georges 3–1. Cornwall was ousted in five games at the hands of Sorel in the LNAH semi-finals.

=== Year two: 2013–14 ===
In the summer of 2013, the team was purchased by the David Small led group, just before the team would have folded. The LNAH grew to eight teams in 2013 and the River Kings compiled 16-20-4 record to finish seventh in the regular season. Nicolas Corbeil led Cornwall in goals (25) and points (44). Chris Cloutier became a fan-favourite at the Civic Complex, earning 277 penalty minutes in 38 games with the River Kings. Cornwall would fall to eventual LNAH champion Jonquiere in a tough first round series (4-2). The River Kings dropped a 3-2 decision at the hands of the Marquis on home ice in front of more than 3,000 fans.

=== Year three: 2014–15 ===
In spring 2014, the team was sold to Cornwall real estate agent Brock Frost. The team was sold again, pending league approval, to Darren Madden in November 2014. On December 4, 2014, Darren Madden withdrew his application to purchase the team. On December 9, 2014, the LNAH took control of the team with hopes of finding a suitable owner. On December 10, 2014, Steve Moreau and family, founders of E-Steam Canada, The Hot Sauce Kiosk and VenLyn Group was announced as the new team owner.

Cornwall went 11-26-3 in 2014–15, finishing last in the league. Rookie forward Antony Courcelles thrilled fans at the Civic Complex with his speed and accurate shot. Courcelles led the River Kings in goals (21) and points (34). Defenceman Sasha Pokulok, the team's first ever draft pick in 2012, had 27 points in 32 games. Enforcer Curtis Tidball, acquired midway through the season, became popular with local hockey fans, earning 102 penalty minutes in 13 games with Cornwall. The River Kings took on Sorel in the first round of the LNAH playoffs. Despite finishing 37 points behind the Eperviers, Cornwall took the regular season champions to the limit, eventually falling 4–3.

=== Year four: 2015–16 ===
As stability finally arrived at the ownership level, the River Kings could never recover from a poor start and a decimated blueline due to injury. The River Kings finished eighth in the LNAH with an 11-25-4 record. A massive overhaul was done at the trade deadline and Cornwall finished the regular season strong. The River Kings went 7-1-1 in a nine-game stretch before the playoffs. Francois Ouimet and Sy Nutkevitch led the River Kings in scoring with 32 points. Newly acquired forward Keven Veilleux was a force late in the season, scoring 13 points in 12 games. In the playoffs, the River Kings were ousted by the first-place Jonquiere Marquis in four straight games.

=== 2016: folding ===
On August 19, 2016, the River Kings' owners announced that the team would no longer continue operations due to lack of fan support and the heavy financial burdens of running the team. The owners claimed they had to close their other businesses to keep the team operating during the previous season and they could no longer operate the team. Within 12 hours, the city removed the River Kings logo from centre ice, even while the ownership was working to find last-minute financing. The owners announced on August 23 that they were unable to convince any new investors due to the only thing the team could offer would be revenue from ticket sales and advertisement as a sponsor. The team could not offer revenue from beer or concession stands or discounts on ice time. However, on August 23, the final efforts of a group of fans, led by local Rodney Rivette, had claimed to have raised over $60,000 in pledged commitments since the announcement about folding in the hopes to convince the league to keep the team.

The LNAH Board of Governors were to meet on August 22 to determine the fate of the team in order to try to keep eight teams for the 2016–17 season, however, the decision was then postponed to August 24. The league then decided to give an August 29 deadline on whether to find a way to compete with eight teams or rearrange the schedules of the remaining seven teams. On August 29, the LNAH announced that the fundraising by the River Kings' fans fell short of the necessary requirements and the league decided to play the season with seven teams. The River Kings players would be made available via a dispersal draft on August 31.

The team would be quickly replaced by a team in the Federal Hockey League called the Cornwall Nationals in September. The Nationals were created by Rodney Rivette and Mitch Gagne after failing to save the River Kings. But they will be making a return in the 2023/24 season and they will be affiliated with the Belleville Senators .
