= Sergei Zvyagin =

Russian ice hockey player

Sergei Zvyagin (Russian: Сергей Звягин; born February 17, 1971, in Moscow, Russia) is a Russian ice hockey goaltender.

== Career ==
He started with Krylia Sovetov in the Russian Hockey League in 1990. He played for the Soviet Union at the 1991 World Junior Ice Hockey Championships. Moved to the United States in 1994 where he played for the Detroit Falcons ice hockey team. He also played with other hockey teams in the United States including Quad City Mallards, Michigan K-Wings, and San Antonio Dragons. He played in Roller Hockey International with the Oakland Skates and New Jersey Rockin' Rollers. Zvyagin played in the 2006 European Champions Cup and was noted for stopping 4 goals in one game. He plays in his father's favorite team the Moscow Dynamo as a goaltender and joined then in September 2009 to Vityaz Podolsk.

== Honours ==
- IIHF European Champions Cup: 2006
- Turnir na prizy LenVO: 2006

Preceded by Rich Parent	CoHL Best Goaltender of the Year; 1996–97	Succeeded by Darryl Gilmour
