= Éric Dandenault =

Canadian ice hockey player and coach

- Born: March 10, 1970 (age 55) Sherbrooke, Quebec, Canada
- Height: 6 ft 0 in (183 cm)
- Weight: 196 lb (89 kg; 14 st 0 lb)
- Position: Defence
- Shot: Right
- Played for: Hershey Bears; Cincinnati Cyclones; Berlin Capitals; Augsburger Panther; DEG Metro Stars
- NHL draft: Undrafted
- Playing career: 1991–2006

Éric Dandenault (born March 10, 1970) is a Canadian former professional ice hockey player who played in the American Hockey League (AHL), International Hockey League (IHL), and Deutsche Eishockey Liga (DEL). He signed a three-year contract as an undrafted free agent with the Philadelphia Flyers and started his pro career in 1991 with their AHL affiliate, the Hershey Bears. He was the head coach of the Windsor Wild in the Ligue Nord-Américaine de Hockey (LNAH).
