= Darryl Gilmour =

Canadian ice hockey player

- Born: February 13, 1967 (age 59) Winnipeg, Manitoba, Canada
- Height: 6 ft 0 in (183 cm)
- Weight: 180 lb (82 kg; 12 st 12 lb)
- Position: Goaltender
- Played for: NHL; Philadelphia Flyers; Los Angeles Kings; AHL; Hershey Bears; New Haven Nighthawks; Springfield Indians; ECHL; Nashville Knights; IHL; Phoenix Roadrunners; Fort Wayne Komets; Kalamazoo Wings; Minnesota Moose; Milwaukee Admirals; CoHL/UHL; Muskegon Fury; Quad City Mallards; Madison Monsters
- NHL draft: 48th overall, 1985; Philadelphia Flyers
- Playing career: 1987–1999

Darryl Gilmour (born February 13, 1967) is a Canadian retired professional ice hockey goaltender. He was selected by the Philadelphia Flyers in the third round (48th overall) of the 1985 NHL entry draft.

== Awards and honours ==
- 1987–88: Calder Cup champion (Hershey Bears)

Award	Year
WHL (East) First All-Star Team	1985–86
UHL Best Goaltender	1997–98

Preceded by Sergei Zvyagin	UHL Best Goaltender; 1997–98	Succeeded by Joe Dimaline
