= Rich Parent =

Canadian ice hockey player

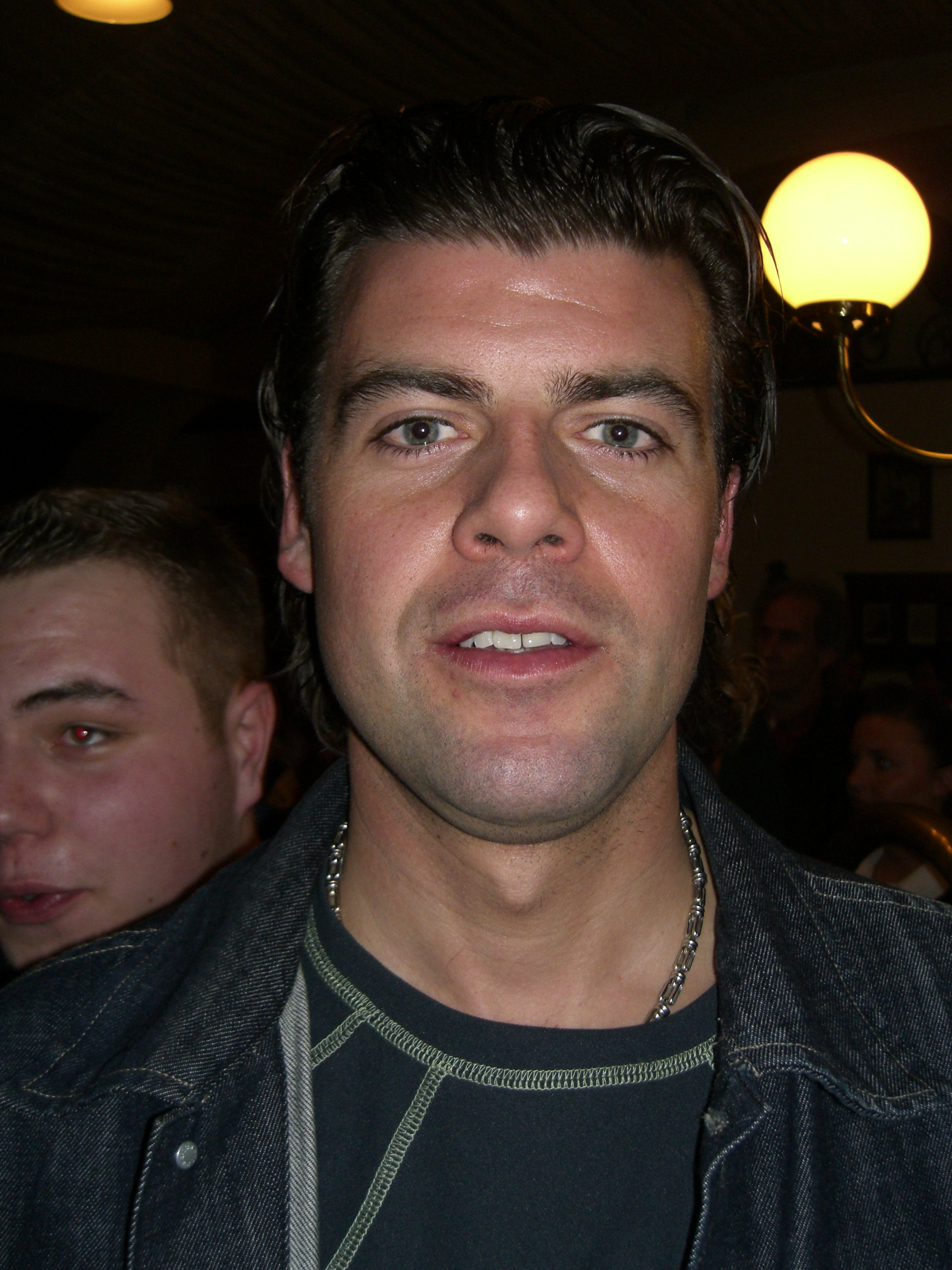
- Born: March 29, 1973 (age 53) Montreal, Quebec, Canada
- Height: 6 ft 3 in (191 cm)
- Weight: 215 lb (98 kg; 15 st 5 lb)
- Position: Goaltender
- Caught: Left
- Played for: St. Louis Blues; Tampa Bay Lightning; Pittsburgh Penguins; Iserlohn Roosters; Kassel Huskies; Eisbären Berlin; Hannover Scorpions
- NHL draft: Undrafted
- Playing career: 1994–2006

Rich Parent (born March 29, 1973) is a Canadian former professional ice hockey goaltender who played 32 games in the National Hockey League (NHL) with the St. Louis Blues, Tampa Bay Lightning and Pittsburgh Penguins between 1997 and 2001.

He is the former Head Coach of the now defunct Mississippi Sea Wolves of the Federal Prospects Hockey League.

== Playing career ==
Born in Montreal, Quebec, Parent began his junior career in the Western Hockey League (WHL) as the goalie of the Spokane Chiefs. After one year with the Chiefs, Parent turned professional when he joined the Muskegon Fury of the Colonial Hockey League (CoHL). During the 1995–96 season, Parent was a CoHL first team All-Star, named the CoHL Most Outstanding Goalie, and also played 19 games with the Detroit Vipers of the International Hockey League and 2 games with the Rochester Americans of the American Hockey League. The following season Parent played full-time with the Vipers and led them to a Turner Cup victory. The St. Louis Blues signed Parent to a contract following the season and Parent made his debut in the NHL, playing for 12 minutes in a game for the Blues.

For the 1998–99 season Parent split the year between the Blues and the Worcester IceCats, the Blues' minor league affiliate. During the season, he was injured by a slapshot by teammate Al MacInnis and was diagnosed with a ruptured testicle. Midway through 1999–2000 season Parent was traded to the Tampa Bay Lightning, where he played in a career-high 14 games for the Lightning. The 2000–01 season saw Parent sign as a free agent with the Pittsburgh Penguins. He played 7 games with the Penguins, but played the majority of the season for their affiliate, the Wilkes-Barre/Scranton Penguins.

In July 2001 Parent signed on to play in Germany, playing for Iserlohn, Kassel, Berlin and Hannover before retiring in 2006.

== Career statistics ==
=== Regular season and playoffs ===
| | | | Regular season | | | | | | | | | Playoffs |
| Season | Team | League | GP | W | L | T | MIN | GA | SO | GAA | SV% | GP | W | L | MIN | GA | SO | GAA | SV% |
|---|---|---|---|---|---|---|---|---|---|---|---|---|---|---|---|---|---|---|---|
| 1991–92 | Fort McMurray Oil Barons | AJHL | 23 | — | — | — | 1,363 | 90 | 0 | 3.96 | — | 9 | — | — | 519 | 30 | 1 | 3.47 | — |
| 1991–92 | Vernon Lakers | BCJHL | 2 | 0 | 1 | 0 | 52 | 5 | 0 | 5.77 | — | — | — | — | — | — | — | — | — |
| 1992–93 | Spokane Chiefs | WHL | 36 | 12 | 14 | 2 | 1,767 | 129 | 2 | 4.38 | .876 | 1 | 0 | 0 | 5 | 0 | 0 | 0.00 | 1.000 |
| 1993–94 | Fort McMurray Oil Barons | AJHL | 29 | — | — | — | 1,712 | 91 | 1 | 3.19 | — | — | — | — | — | — | — | — | — |
| 1994–95 | Muskegon Fury | CoHL | 35 | 17 | 11 | 3 | 1,867 | 112 | 1 | 3.60 | .889 | 13 | 7 | 3 | 725 | 47 | 1 | 3.89 | .869 |
| 1995–96 | Muskegon Fury | CoHL | 36 | 23 | 7 | 4 | 2,087 | 85 | 2 | 2.44 | .930 | — | — | — | — | — | — | — | — |
| 1995–96 | Rochester Americans | AHL | 2 | 0 | 1 | 0 | 90 | 6 | 0 | 4.02 | .875 | — | — | — | — | — | — | — | — |
| 1995–96 | Detroit Vipers | IHL | 19 | 16 | 0 | 1 | 1,040 | 48 | 2 | 2.77 | .908 | 7 | 3 | 3 | 363 | 22 | 0 | 3.64 | .901 |
| 1996–97 | Detroit Vipers | IHL | 53 | 31 | 13 | 4 | 2,815 | 104 | 4 | 2.22 | .920 | 15 | 8 | 3 | 786 | 21 | 1 | 1.60 | .939 |
| 1997–98 | St. Louis Blues | NHL | 1 | 0 | 0 | 0 | 13 | 0 | 0 | 0.00 | 1.000 | — | — | — | — | — | — | — | — |
| 1997–98 | Manitoba Moose | IHL | 26 | 8 | 12 | 2 | 1,334 | 69 | 3 | 3.10 | .905 | — | — | — | — | — | — | — | — |
| 1997–98 | Detroit Vipers | IHL | 7 | 4 | 0 | 3 | 417 | 15 | 0 | 2.15 | .907 | 5 | 1 | 0 | 157 | 6 | 0 | 2.29 | .907 |
| 1998–99 | St. Louis Blues | NHL | 10 | 4 | 3 | 1 | 519 | 22 | 1 | 2.54 | .886 | — | — | — | — | — | — | — | — |
| 1998–99 | Worcester IceCats | AHL | 20 | 8 | 8 | 2 | 1,100 | 56 | 1 | 3.05 | .893 | — | — | — | — | — | — | — | — |
| 1999–00 | Tampa Bay Lightning | NHL | 14 | 2 | 7 | 1 | 698 | 43 | 0 | 3.70 | .878 | — | — | — | — | — | — | — | — |
| 1999–00 | Utah Grizzlies | IHL | 27 | 17 | 7 | 3 | 1,571 | 58 | 1 | 2.21 | .919 | — | — | — | — | — | — | — | — |
| 1999–00 | Detroit Vipers | IHL | 10 | 3 | 5 | 1 | 539 | 23 | 1 | 2.56 | .923 | — | — | — | — | — | — | — | — |
| 2000–01 | Pittsburgh Penguins | NHL | 7 | 1 | 1 | 3 | 332 | 17 | 0 | 3.08 | .887 | — | — | — | — | — | — | — | — |
| 2000–01 | Wilkes-Barre/Scranton Penguins | AHL | 35 | 17 | 12 | 5 | 2,043 | 80 | 2 | 2.35 | .922 | 21 | 13 | 8 | 1347 | 58 | 1 | 2.58 | .912 |
| 2001–02 | Iserlohn Roosters | DEL | 19 | — | — | — | 1,056 | 43 | 2 | 2.44 | .910 | — | — | — | — | — | — | — | — |
| 2002–03 | Kassel Huskies | DEL | 36 | — | — | — | 1,964 | 72 | 6 | 2.20 | .922 | 7 | — | — | 418 | 21 | 0 | 3.01 | .922 |
| 2003–04 | Eisbären Berlin | DEL | 27 | — | — | — | 1,572 | 62 | 1 | 2.37 | .910 | 5 | — | — | 314 | 15 | 0 | 2.87 | .892 |
| 2004–05 | Hannover Scorpions | DEL | 24 | — | — | — | 1,368 | 67 | 1 | 2.94 | .899 | — | — | — | — | — | — | — | — |
| 2005–06 | Iserlohn Roosters | DEL | 11 | — | — | — | 607 | 38 | 0 | 3.75 | .883 | — | — | — | — | — | — | — | — |
| NHL totals | | | 32 | 7 | 11 | 5 | 1,561 | 82 | 1 | 3.15 | .882 | — | — | — | — | — | — | — | — |

== Awards ==
- 1996: ColHL First Team All-Star
- 1996: ColHL Outstanding Goaltender
- 1997: James Norris Memorial Trophy (Fewest Goals Allowed in IHL. Shared with Jeff Reese.)

| Preceded by Maxim Mikhailovsky | CoHL Best Goaltender of the Year; 1995–96 | Succeeded by Sergei Zvyagin |
