= UHL Best Goaltender =

- Description: Awarded annually to the best goaltender in the United Hockey League as selected by league general managers, head coaches, and media members
- Country: United States
- Presented by: United Hockey League

The UHL Best Goaltender (prior to 1997 was Colonial Hockey League Best Goaltender of the Year) was awarded annually to the best goaltender in the United Hockey League (UHL) as selected by league general managers, head coaches, and members of the media.

== List of winners ==
Season	Winner	Team	Pts
1991–92	Jamie Stewart	Michigan Falcons	
1992–93	Jamie Stewart	Detroit Falcons	
1993–94	Jean-Francois Labbe	Thunder Bay Senators	
1994–95	Maxim Mikhailovsky	Detroit Falcons	
1995–96	Rich Parent	Detroit Vipers	
1996–97	Sergei Zvyagin	Michigan K-Wings	
1997–98	Darryl Gilmour	Madison Monsters	
1998–99	Joe Dimaline	Muskegon Fury	
1999–00	Brian Regan	Missouri River Otters	
2000–01	Blair Allison	New Haven Knights	
2001–02	Sylvain Daigle	Muskegon Fury	
2002–03	Tom Lawson	Fort Wayne Komets	
2003–04	Kevin St. Pierre	Fort Wayne Komets	
2004–05	Michel Robinson	Rockford IceHogs	
2005–06	Joel Martin	Kalamazoo Wings	
2006–07	Kevin St. Pierre	Fort Wayne Komets	
