= Maxim Mikhailovsky =

Russian ice hockey player

- Born: July 24, 1969 (age 56) Moscow, Russia
- Height: 6 ft 0 in (183 cm)
- Weight: 192 lb (87 kg; 13 st 10 lb)
- Position: Goaltender
- Caught: Left
- Played for: RSL; HC CSKA Moscow; HC Lada Togliatti; Severstal Cherepovets; Torpedo Nizhny Novgorod; AHL; Adirondack Red Wings; IHL; Detroit Vipers; Milwaukee Admirals; CoHL; Detroit Falcons; RHI; Los Angeles Blades
- National team: Russia
- NHL draft: Undrafted
- Playing career: 1988–2006

Maxim Mikhailovich Mikhailovsky (Russian: Максим Михайлович Михайловски; born July 24, 1969) is a Russian former professional ice hockey goaltender.

Mikhailovsky competed at the 1997 Men's World Ice Hockey Championships as a member of the Russia men's national ice hockey team. He played for HC CSKA Moscow. He was inducted into the Russian and Soviet Hockey Hall of Fame in 1993.

Mikhailovsky appeared on the cover of RHI Roller Hockey '95 video game.

== Awards and honours ==
Award	Year
UHL Best Goaltender	1994–95

Preceded by Jean-Francois Labbe	CoHL Best Goaltender of the Year; 1994–95	Succeeded by Rich Parent
