= Jean-François Labbé =

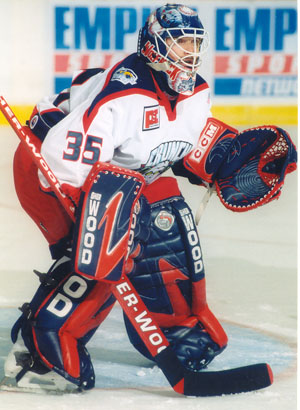
- Labbé with the Syracuse Crunch during the 2001–02 season
- Born: June 15, 1972 (age 54) Sherbrooke, Quebec, Canada
- Height: 5 ft 10 in (178 cm)
- Weight: 172 lb (78 kg; 12 st 4 lb)
- Position: Goaltender
- Caught: Left
- Played for: New York Rangers; Columbus Blue Jackets; HC Lada Togliatti; Augsburger Panther; Thomas Sabo Ice Tigers; Vienna Capitals
- NHL draft: Undrafted
- Playing career: 1993–2011

Jean-François Labbé (born June 15, 1972) is a Canadian former professional ice hockey goaltender who played 15 games in the National Hockey League with the New York Rangers and the Columbus Blue Jackets between 2000 and 2003.

== Playing career ==
As a youth, he played in the 1984 and 1986 Quebec International Pee-Wee Hockey Tournaments with a minor ice hockey team from Sherbrooke.

After playing four seasons in the Quebec Major Junior Hockey League, Labbé began a very successful American Hockey League career. He played for the Prince Edward Island Senators, Cornwall Aces, Hershey Bears, Hamilton Bulldogs, Hartford Wolf Pack and Syracuse Crunch in his AHL tenure. His best season came in 1996–1997 with the Hershey Bears, when he won both the Hap Holmes Memorial Award for lowest goals against average and the Les Cunningham Award for league MVP. Labbé won the Calder Cup with the Hartford Wolf Pack in 2000.

Labbé appeared in 15 NHL games: one with the New York Rangers at the end of the 1999–2000 season and 14 with the Columbus Blue Jackets during the 2001–02 and 2002–03 seasons.

He played for the Saint-Georges Garaga in the Ligue Nord-Américaine de Hockey in 2003–2004 after a short stint with the Tolyatti Lada in the Russian Hockey Super League.

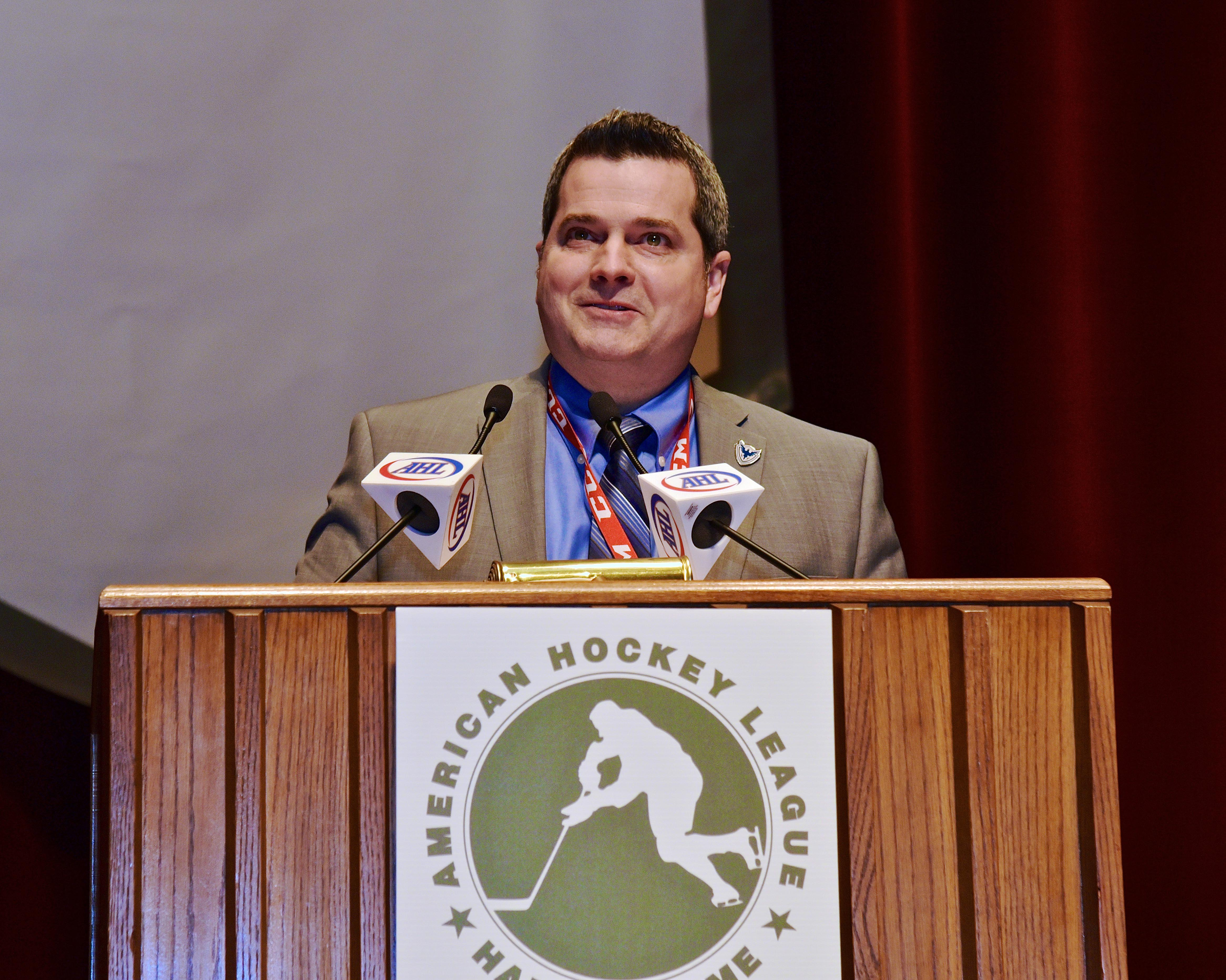
Labbé in 2016

Labbé played in the DEL for three seasons, with Augsburger Panther in 2004–05 and with the Sinupret Ice Tigers in 2005–06 and 2006–07. For the 2008 and 2009 season he joined the Vienna Capitals in Austria's Erste Bank Hockey League.

He finished his career in 2011 after a season with the Sherbrooke Saint-François in the Ligue Nord-Américaine de Hockey. Labbé was selected for induction as part of the American Hockey League Hall of Fame's 2016 class.

== Records ==
Labbé currently holds records with the Syracuse Crunch for:

- Lowest GAA in a single season - 2.18 (2001–02)
- Highest single season save percentage - .928 (2001–02)
- Career shutouts - 11

== Career statistics ==
=== Regular season and playoffs ===
			Regular season										Playoffs
Season	Team	League	GP	W	L	T	OTL	MIN	GA	SO	GAA	SV%	GP	W	L	MIN	GA	SO	GAA	SV%
1988–89	Montreal Cantons de l'Est Cantonniers	QMAAA	29	22	7	0	—	1764	94	1	3.20	—	5	1	4	333	19	0	3.42	—
1989–90	Trois-Rivières Draveurs	QMJHL	28	13	10	0	—	1499	106	1	4.24	.865	3	1	1	132	8	0	3.64	.896
1990–91	Trois-Rivières Draveurs	QMJHL	54	35	14	0	—	2870	158	5	3.30	.892	5	1	4	230	19	0	4.96	.867
1991–92	Trois-Rivières Draveurs	QMJHL	48	31	13	3	—	2749	142	1	3.10	.896	15	10	3	791	33	1	2.50	.915
1992–93	Hull Olympiques	QMJHL	46	26	18	2	—	2701	156	2	3.46	.897	10	6	3	518	24	1	2.78	.925
1992–93	Sherbrooke Faucons	QMJHL	3	1	2	0	—	187	13	0	4.16	.860	—	—	—	—	—	—	—	—
1993–94	Thunder Bay Senators	CoHL	52	35	11	4	—	2900	150	2	3.10	.900	8	7	1	493	18	2	2.19	.929
1993–94	Prince Edward Island Senators	AHL	7	4	3	0	—	389	22	0	3.39	.901	—	—	—	—	—	—	—	—
1994–95	Thunder Bay Senators	CoHL	2	2	0	0	—	120	6	1	3.00	.897	—	—	—	—	—	—	—	—
1994–95	Prince Edward Island Senators	AHL	32	13	14	3	—	1817	94	2	3.10	.906	—	—	—	—	—	—	—	—
1995–96	Cornwall Aces	AHL	55	25	21	5	—	2972	144	3	2.91	.893	8	3	5	471	21	1	2.68	.920
1996–97	Hershey Bears	AHL	66	34	22	9	—	3811	160	6	2.52	.914	23	14	8	1364	59	1	2.60	.916
1997–98	Hamilton Bulldogs	AHL	52	24	17	11	—	3138	149	2	2.85	.913	7	3	4	413	20	0	2.90	.915
1998–99	Hartford Wolf Pack	AHL	59	28	26	3	—	3392	182	2	3.22	.898	7	3	4	447	22	0	2.95	.911
1999–00	New York Rangers	NHL	1	0	1	0	—	60	3	0	3.00	.864	—	—	—	—	—	—	—	—
1999–00	Hartford Wolf Pack	AHL	49	27	13	7	—	2853	120	1	2.52	.924	22	15	7	1320	48	3	2.18	.935
2000–01	Hartford Wolf Pack	AHL	8	4	2	1	—	394	20	0	3.04	.911	—	—	—	—	—	—	—	—
2000–01	Syracuse Crunch	AHL	37	15	15	5	—	2201	105	2	2.86	.924	5	2	3	323	18	0	3.34	.920
2001–02	Columbus Blue Jackets	NHL	3	1	1	0	—	118	6	0	3.07	.912	—	—	—	—	—	—	—	—
2001–02	Syracuse Crunch	AHL	51	27	16	7	—	2993	109	9	2.18	.928	10	6	4	596	19	2	1.91	.939
2002–03	Columbus Blue Jackets	NHL	11	2	4	0	—	452	27	0	3.59	.884	—	—	—	—	—	—	—	—
2002–03	Syracuse Crunch	AHL	4	1	2	1	—	247	11	0	2.68	.917	—	—	—	—	—	—	—	—
2003–04	Lada Togliatti	RSL	30	17	5	3	—	1725	43	8	1.50	.937	—	—	—	—	—	—	—	—
2003–04	Garaga de Saint-Georges	QSPHL	11	8	1	2	—	669	22	2	1.97	.933	23	—	—	—	—	—	—	—
2004–05	Augsburg Panthers	DEL	50	—	—	—	—	2970	139	3	2.81	.911	5	—	—	298	17	0	3.42	.917
2005–06	Nürnberg Ice Tigers	DEL	49	—	—	—	—	2888	104	3	2.16	.927	4	—	—	220	17	0	4.63	.850
2006–07	Nürnberg Ice Tigers	DEL	44	—	—	—	—	2540	103	5	2.43	.920	13	—	—	827	38	2	2.76	.920
2007–08	Vienna Capitals	EBEL	6	4	1	—	0	—	—	1	1.75	.942	—	—	—	—	—	—	—	—
2008–09	Vienna Capitals	EBEL	44	—	—	—	—	—	—	5	2.65	.916	11	—	—	—	—	—	2.28	.926
2009–10	Flint Generals	IHL	12	3	6	—	2	621	37	0	3.57	.895	—	—	—	—	—	—	—	—
2010–11	Saint-François de Sherbrooke	LNAH	4	1	2	—	1	241	11	0	2.74	.916	—	—	—	—	—	—	—	—
NHL totals			15	3	6	0	—	629	36	0	3.44	.889	—	—	—	—	—	—	—	—

== Awards and honours ==
Award	Year
QMJHL
All-Star Team	1991–92
Jacques Plante Memorial Trophy	1991–92
CHL Third All-Star Team	1991–92
CoHL
All-Star Team	1993–94
American Hockey League
First All-Star Team	1996–97
Calder Cup	1996–97, 1999–2000
Hap Holmes Memorial Award	1996–97, 1999–2000
Aldege "Baz" Bastien Memorial Award	1996–97
Les Cunningham Award	1996–97
Second All-Star Team	2001–02
DEL
Best GAA	2005–06

Awards and achievements
Preceded by Jamie Stewart	CoHL Best Goaltender of the Year; 1993–94	Succeeded by Maxim Mikhailovsky
Preceded by Manny Legace and Scott Langkow	Winner of the Hap Holmes Memorial Award; 1996–97	Succeeded by Jean-Sébastien Giguère and Tyler Moss
Preceded by Brad Smyth	Winner of the Les Cunningham Award; 1996–97	Succeeded by Steve Guolla
Preceded by Manny Legace	Aldege "Baz" Bastien Memorial Award; 1996–97	Succeeded by Scott Langkow
