= Jeff Reese =

Canadian ice hockey player (born 1966)

- Born: March 24, 1966 (age 60) Brantford, Ontario, Canada
- Height: 5 ft 9 in (175 cm)
- Weight: 170 lb (77 kg; 12 st 2 lb)
- Position: Goaltender
- Caught: Left
- Played for: Toronto Maple Leafs; Calgary Flames; Hartford Whalers; Tampa Bay Lightning; New Jersey Devils
- NHL draft: 67th overall, 1984; Toronto Maple Leafs
- Playing career: 1986–1999

Jeffrey K. Reese (born March 24, 1966) is a Canadian former professional ice hockey goaltender who played eleven seasons in the National Hockey League (NHL) for the Toronto Maple Leafs, Calgary Flames, Hartford Whalers, Tampa Bay Lightning and New Jersey Devils. He has been the Dallas Stars' goaltending coach since 2015 and was the goaltending coach for the Lightning from 2001 to 2009 and for the Philadelphia Flyers from 2009 to March 2015.

== Playing career ==
The Toronto Maple Leafs drafted Reese in the fourth round, 67th overall, of the 1984 NHL entry draft from the London Knights. He spent four seasons with the Knights before turning pro with the Maple Leafs' American Hockey League farm team, the Newmarket Saints, in 1986.

=== Toronto Maple Leafs ===
During his second season as a pro he made his NHL debut when he was called up to Toronto and appeared in five games. The following year he doubled his totals playing ten games with the Leafs and 37 more with Newmarket. In 1989–90 he logged 21 games with the Maple Leafs sharing duties with Allan Bester and Mark Laforest. The following season he upped his totals to 30 games backing up rookie Peter Ing who won the starting job in Toronto. A year later, the Maple Leafs made a blockbuster trade to bring in Hall of Famer Grant Fuhr to handle the goaltending duties (with Ing part of the package leaving town) allowing Reese to apprentice in the crease behind Fuhr but it was a short lived arrangement because Reese himself was soon part of an enormous trade. On January 2, 1992, Reese was included in a ten-player trade that also sent Craig Berube, Alexander Godynyuk, Gary Leeman and Michel Petit to the Calgary Flames in exchange for Doug Gilmour, Jamie Macoun, Kent Manderville, Ric Nattress and Rick Wamsley.

=== Calgary Flames ===
With the Flames, Reese became the backup to incumbent Mike Vernon and parts of three seasons in Calgary and played 26 games in 1992–93 posting an impressive 14-4-1 record. The highlight of his time in Calgary came on February 10, 1993, when he entered the NHL record book by posting three assists in a 13-1 Flames victory. With the emergence of first round draft pick Trevor Kidd in the Flames net, Reese was out of a job and found himself on the move early in the 1993–94 season when Calgary traded him to the Hartford Whalers in exchange for defenseman Dan Keczmer.

=== Hartford Whalers ===
In Hartford, he was acquired to back up Sean Burke. When Burke struggled with back issues, Reese and goaltender Frank Pietrangelo each logged 19 games in the Hartford crease. Much like in Calgary before, the emergence of a younger netminder - this time Jason Muzzatti - pushed him out and led to a trade to the Tampa Bay Lightning.

=== Tampa Bay Lightning ===
Tampa Bay had a solid starting goalie in Daren Puppa but his backup, Jean-Claude Bergeron was struggling for the Lightning so the veteran Reese took over the duties and acquitted himself well with a 7-7-1 record in 19 appearances. During the off-season, he was on the move again when he was sent to New Jersey in a swap for goaltender Corey Schwab.

=== New Jersey Devils ===
With the Devils, Reese was slotted behind Martin Brodeur but quickly lost his backup job to rookie Mike Dunham and instead spent the majority of the 1996–97 season with the Detroit Vipers of the International Hockey League, splitting time with starting goaltender Rich Parent. The duo combined to win the James Norris Memorial Trophy, allowing the fewest goals in the league. The Vipers went on to win the 1997 Turner Cup. Reese was the starting goaltender for the Vipers during the 1997–98 season. He was named to the All-IHL Second Team in both 1997 and 1998.

=== Return to the Toronto Maple Leafs ===
As an unrestricted free agent in the summer of 1998, Reese's career went full-circle when he signed with the Toronto Maple Leafs organization. The Maple Leafs signed goaltender Curtis Joseph that summer as well and had planned to deal incumbent Felix Potvin away, but when that trade did not transpire, that started the season with both Joseph and Potvin on the roster pushing Reese down to the minors. He would play his final two NHL games with the Maple Leafs while also playing 27 games with the St. John's Maple Leafs of the American Hockey League. He was traded back to Tampa Bay in the off-season so they would have a veteran goalie to expose in the 1999 NHL Expansion Draft. He was not selected by the Atlanta Thrashers and retired that summer.

== Coaching career ==
After retiring Reese worked as a goalie coach with the Lightning organization and won the Stanley Cup with them in 2004. On June 25, 2009, he was hired by the Philadelphia Flyers as their goalie coach, replacing Réjean Lemelin. On March 6, 2015, Reese and the Flyers management mutually agreed to part ways. On June 15, 2015, he joined the Dallas Stars as their goaltending coach.

== Career statistics ==
=== Regular season and playoffs ===
			Regular season									Playoffs
Season	Team	League	GP	W	L	T	MIN	GA	SO	GAA	SV%	GP	W	L	MIN	GA	SO	GAA	SV%
1983–84	London Knights	OHL	43	18	19	1	2038	173	0	4.50	—	6	3	3	327	27	0	4.95	—
1984–85	London Knights	OHL	50	31	51	1	2878	186	1	3.88	—	8	5	2	440	25	1	2.73	—
1985–86	London Knights	OHL	57	25	26	3	3281	215	0	3.93	.891	5	0	4	299	25	0	5.02	—
1986–87	Newmarket Saints	AHL	50	11	29	0	2822	193	1	4.10	.833	—	—	—	—	—	—	—	—
1987–88	Newmarket Saints	AHL	28	10	14	3	1587	103	0	3.89	.880	—	—	—	—	—	—	—	—
1987–88	Toronto Maple Leafs	NHL	5	1	2	1	249	17	0	4.10	.867	—	—	—	—	—	—	—	—
1988–89	Newmarket Saints	AHL	37	17	14	3	2072	132	0	3.82	.882	—	—	—	—	—	—	—	—
1988–89	Toronto Maple Leafs	NHL	10	2	6	1	487	40	0	4.94	.860	—	—	—	—	—	—	—	—
1989–90	Newmarket Saints	AHL	7	3	2	2	431	29	0	4.04	.888	—	—	—	—	—	—	—	—
1989–90	Toronto Maple Leafs	NHL	21	9	6	3	1102	81	0	4.41	.871	2	1	1	109	6	0	3.33	.880
1990–91	Newmarket Saints	AHL	3	2	1	0	180	7	0	2.33	.922	—	—	—	—	—	—	—	—
1990–91	Toronto Maple Leafs	NHL	30	6	13	3	1430	92	1	3.86	.868	—	—	—	—	—	—	—	—
1991–92	Toronto Maple Leafs	NHL	8	1	5	1	414	20	1	2.90	.905	—	—	—	—	—	—	—	—
1991–92	Calgary Flames	NHL	26	14	4	1	1311	70	1	3.20	.889	—	—	—	—	—	—	—	—
1992–93	Calgary Flames	NHL	12	3	2	2	588	37	0	3.78	.872	4	1	3	209	17	0	4.88	.813
1993–94	Calgary Flames	NHL	1	0	0	0	14	1	0	4.52	.800	—	—	—	—	—	—	—	—
1993–94	Hartford Whalers	NHL	19	5	9	3	1086	56	1	3.09	.893	—	—	—	—	—	—	—	—
1994–95	Hartford Whalers	NHL	11	2	5	1	478	26	1	3.27	.889	—	—	—	—	—	—	—	—
1995–96	Hartford Whalers	NHL	7	2	3	0	275	14	1	3.06	.918	—	—	—	—	—	—	—	—
1995–96	Tampa Bay Lightning	NHL	19	7	7	1	994	54	0	3.26	.884	5	1	1	198	12	0	3.64	.880
1996–97	Detroit Vipers	IHL	32	23	4	3	1763	14	4	1.87	.926	11	7	3	518	22	0	2.55	.926
1996–97	New Jersey Devils	NHL	3	0	2	0	275	13	0	5.62	.800	—	—	—	—	—	—	—	—
1997–98	Detroit Vipers	IHL	46	27	9	8	2570	95	4	2.22	.917	22	13	9	1276	52	2	2.44	.913
1998–99	St. John's Maple Leafs	AHL	27	17	7	3	1555	66	0	2.55	.921	3	1	1	142	8	0	3.39	.884
1998–99	Toronto Maple Leafs	NHL	2	1	1	0	107	8	0	4.51	.843	—	—	—	—	—	—	—	—
NHL totals			174	53	65	17	4380	529	5	3.66	.879	11	3	5	516	35	0	4.08	.855
