= Scott Langkow =

Canadian ice hockey player

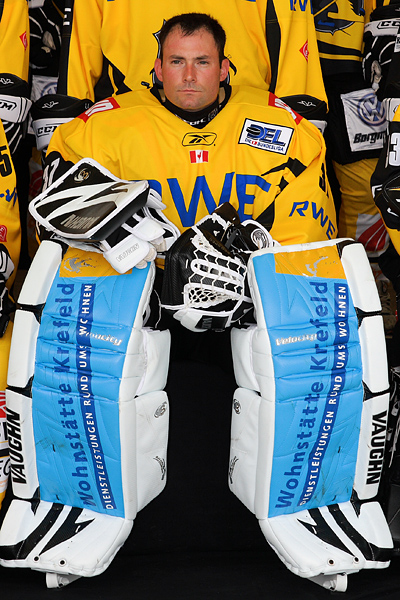
- Born: April 21, 1975 (age 51) Sherwood Park, Alberta, Canada
- Height: 5 ft 11 in (180 cm)
- Weight: 190 lb (86 kg; 13 st 8 lb)
- Position: Goaltender
- Caught: Left
- DEL team Former teams: Krefeld Pinguine; Winnipeg Jets; Phoenix Coyotes; Atlanta Thrashers; Jokerit; Ässät; HV71; Rapperswil-Jona Lakers; Metallurg Novokuznetsk
- NHL draft: 31st overall, 1993; Winnipeg Jets
- Playing career: 1995–2013

Scott Langkow (born April 21, 1975) is a Canadian former professional ice hockey goaltender. He played 20 National Hockey League games and for numerous teams in the minor and European leagues, most notably for the Springfield Falcons of the American Hockey League and the Krefeld Pinguine of the Deutsche Eishockey Liga. Langkow was born in Sherwood Park, Alberta, but grew up in Edmonton, Alberta.

== Playing career ==
Langkow described his playing style as a combination of butterfly and stand-up.

Langkow played for the Portland Winter Hawks in the WHL and recorded three straight 20-win seasons with the club before being drafted by Winnipeg Jets with their 2nd pick, 31st overall, in the 1993 NHL entry draft. When the Winnipeg franchise relocated on July 1, 1996, he was transferred to the Phoenix Coyotes. During this time he won 63 games over three seasons and was one of the top goaltenders in the AHL while playing for the Springfield Falcons. In 1998 he won the Aldege "Baz" Bastien Memorial Award as AHL's best goaltender.

Langkow was traded to Atlanta Thrashers on June 25, 1999, where he played 15 games for the NHL club before being traded again to the Mighty Ducks with Sergei Vyshedkevich for Ladislav Kohn on February 9, 2001.

After four seasons playing for Ässät in the SM-liiga, Langkow signed a one-year contract with HV71 in Sweden's top hockey league Elitserien. After only having played 11 games as starting goalie for HV71 in the Swedish league, Langkow signed with the Swiss team Rapperswil-Jona Lakers in Nationalliga A. In June 2007 he signed a one-year contract with Jokerit of the Finnish SM-liiga.

Although Langkow was contracted to Jokerit his contract was terminated as he was replaced by Jussi Markkanen as the number 1 goaltender for Jokerit.

After playing a single season for Metallurg Novokuznetsk of the Russian league, Langkow signed with the Krefeld Pinguine in 2008, for whom he played as the starting goaltender for five seasons, retiring at the end of the 2013 season.

== Off the ice ==
Langkow is married with one daughter and two sons; Rylan, Beckett, and Calder. He is married to Anya. He has a younger brother named Daymond who had a 17-year NHL career. Langkow likes to go fishing and play golf in his spare time.

== Awards ==
- Named to the WHL West Second All-Star Team in 1994 and 1995.
- Awarded the Hap Holmes Memorial Award (AHL fewest goals against) in 1996. (Shared with Manny Legace)
- Named to the AHL First All-Star Team in 1998.
- Awarded the Aldege "Baz" Bastien Memorial Award (AHL Outstanding Goaltender) in 1998.

== Career statistics ==
=== Regular season and playoffs ===
			Regular season									Playoffs
Season	Team	League	GP	W	L	T	MIN	GA	SO	GAA	SV%	GP	W	L	MIN	GA	SO	GAA	SV%
1990–91	Sherwood Park Flyers U15	AEHL U15	32	—	—	—	1920	128	0	4.00	—	—	—	—	—	—	—	—	—
1991–92	Abbotsford Pilots	PIJHL	—	—	—	—	—	—	—	—	—	—	—	—	—	—	—	—	—
1991–92	Portland Winter Hawks	WHL	1	0	0	0	33	2	0	3.64	.895	—	—	—	—	—	—	—	—
1992–93	Portland Winter Hawks	WHL	34	24	8	2	2064	119	2	3.46	.888	9	6	3	535	31	0	3.48	.877
1993–94	Portland Winter Hawks	WHL	39	27	9	1	2302	121	2	3.15	.896	10	6	4	600	34	0	3.40	.899
1994–95	Portland Winter Hawks	WHL	63	20	36	5	3638	240	1	3.96	.888	8	3	5	510	30	0	3.53	.914
1995–96	Winnipeg Jets	NHL	1	0	0	0	6	0	0	0.00	1.000	—	—	—	—	—	—	—	—
1995–96	Springfield Falcons	AHL	39	18	15	6	2329	116	3	2.99	.897	7	4	2	393	23	0	3.51	.853
1996–97	Springfield Falcons	AHL	33	15	9	7	1929	85	0	2.64	.911	—	—	—	—	—	—	—	—
1997–98	Phoenix Coyotes	NHL	3	0	1	1	137	10	0	4.38	.833	—	—	—	—	—	—	—	—
1997–98	Springfield Falcons	AHL	51	30	13	5	2874	128	3	2.67	.911	4	1	3	216	14	0	3.88	.875
1998–99	Las Vegas Thunder	IHL	27	7	14	2	1402	97	1	4.15	.878	—	—	—	—	—	—	—	—
1998–99	Utah Grizzlies	IHL	21	10	9	2	1227	59	1	2.89	.907	—	—	—	—	—	—	—	—
1998–99	Phoenix Coyotes	NHL	1	0	0	0	35	3	0	5.14	.824	—	—	—	—	—	—	—	—
1999–00	Atlanta Thrashers	NHL	15	3	11	0	765	55	0	4.31	.861	—	—	—	—	—	—	—	—
1999–00	Orlando Solar Bears	IHL	27	14	8	2	1487	57	4	2.30	.899	6	2	3	381	16	0	2.52	.895
2000–01	Mobile Mysticks	ECHL	6	2	4	0	358	23	0	3.86	.879	—	—	—	—	—	—	—	—
2000–01	Orlando Solar Bears	IHL	4	1	1	1	187	9	0	2.88	.864	—	—	—	—	—	—	—	—
2000–01	Cincinnati Mighty Ducks	AHL	15	6	4	4	838	44	1	3.15	.891	3	1	1	142	7	0	2.95	.921
2001–02	Kalamazoo Wings	UHL	53	20	24	7	3021	165	1	3.28	.899	—	—	—	—	—	—	—	—
2002–03	Ässät	SM-l	50	14	24	10	2886	123	3	2.56	.922	—	—	—	—	—	—	—	—
2003–04	Ässät	SM-l	42	13	19	10	2517	125	2	2.98	.913	—	—	—	—	—	—	—	—
2004–05	Ässät	SM-l	43	14	15	13	2588	121	3	2.81	.915	2	0	2	116	5	0	2.57	—
2005–06	Lukko	SM-l	55	15	31	8	3220	131	4	2.44	.923	—	—	—	—	—	—	—	—
2006–07	HV71	SEL	37	—	—	—	659	36	0	3.27	.878	—	—	—	—	—	—	—	—
2006–07	Rapperswil-Jona Lakers	NLA	6	5	1	0	366	17	1	2.79	—	4	1	3	239	18	0	4.52	—
2007–08	Metallurg Novokuznetsk	RSL	13	—	—	—	—	—	—	3.16	.896	—	—	—	—	—	—	—	—
2008–09	Krefeld Pinguine	DEL	48	22	18	0	2794	121	5	2.60	.902	—	—	—	—	—	—	—	—
2009–10	Krefeld Pinguine	DEL	54	20	26	0	3185	154	3	2.90	.896	—	—	—	—	—	—	—	—
2010–11	Krefeld Pinguine	DEL	52	25	25	0	3164	119	8	2.26	.915	—	—	—	—	—	—	—	—
2011–12	Krefeld Pinguine	DEL	50	22	28	0	3035	127	4	2.51	.912	—	—	—	—	—	—	—	—
2012–13	Krefeld Pinguine	DEL	48	29	19	0	2935	127	1	2.60	.906	2	—	—	—	—	—	2.14	.919
NHL totals			20	3	12	1	943	68	0	4.32	—	—	—	—	—	—	—	—

Awards and achievements
Preceded by Jean-François Labbé	Aldege "Baz" Bastien Memorial Award; 1997–98	Succeeded by Martin Biron
