= Michigan Regional Sports Network =

The Michigan Regional Sports Network is an online sports radio network based in Flint, Michigan. The station debuted on August 25, 2008. The station presently serves as the home network of:

- Southeast Michigan high school sports
- Mott Community College Sports
- Local and national sports
- London Mustangs of the Ontario Junior Football League
- Saginaw Swan Valley Sports

MRSN is also an affiliate of Sports USA, which broadcasts the NFL and NCAA. MRSN is the State of Michigan's affiliate station for the Ontario Hockey League's Erie Otters.
