= North Shore Knights =

- City: Kingsville, Ontario
- League: Federal Hockey League
- Founded: 2016
- Home arena: Kingsville Arena Complex
- Owner: Jack Sports Group

Franchise history
- 2016–2017: St. Clair Shores Fighting Saints
- 2017–2018: North Shore Knights

The North Shore Knights were a minor professional ice hockey team in the Federal Hockey League based out of Kingsville, Ontario. The Knights played the majority of their home games at the Kingsville Arena Complex as well as a few home games in several other cities in Ontario and Quebec.

== History ==
In 2016, St. Clair Shores, Michigan, were granted an FHL expansion team for the 2016–17 season. The team went on to play in neutral site games in Battle Creek, Michigan, and Kingsville, Ontario, due to poor attendance in St. Clair Shores. When the schedule was released for the 2017–18 season, the Fighting Saints were listed with home games in Gravenhurst, Ontario, Témiscaming, Quebec, South River, Ontario, and Kingsville, Ontario. The team was later announced to have relocated to Kingsville as the North Shore Knights. The Fighting Saints' ownership group was headed by Michal Kolarik, who also owns the local Kingsville Kings junior hockey team and many players from the Kings also played on the Fighting Saints prior to the relocation.

Over the course of the season, the team had multiple head coaches in Jiri Micka and Stephen Esau. By December 2017, the Knights would forfeit or attempt to reschedule most of their home games before the team would forfeit all remaining home games after February 11. At the end of March, the Knights released all players and staff.

The FHL commissioner confirmed the Knights would not return for the following season.

== Season-by-season records ==
Season	GP	W	L	OTL	Pts (Note: 3 points for a Win, 2 points for an Overtime Win, and 1 point for an Overtime Loss)	Pct	GF	GA	PIM	Finish	Playoffs
2017–18	44	6	38	0	18	.136	103	248	414	6th of 7, FHL	Did not qualify
