= Lou Dickenson =

Canadian ice hockey player

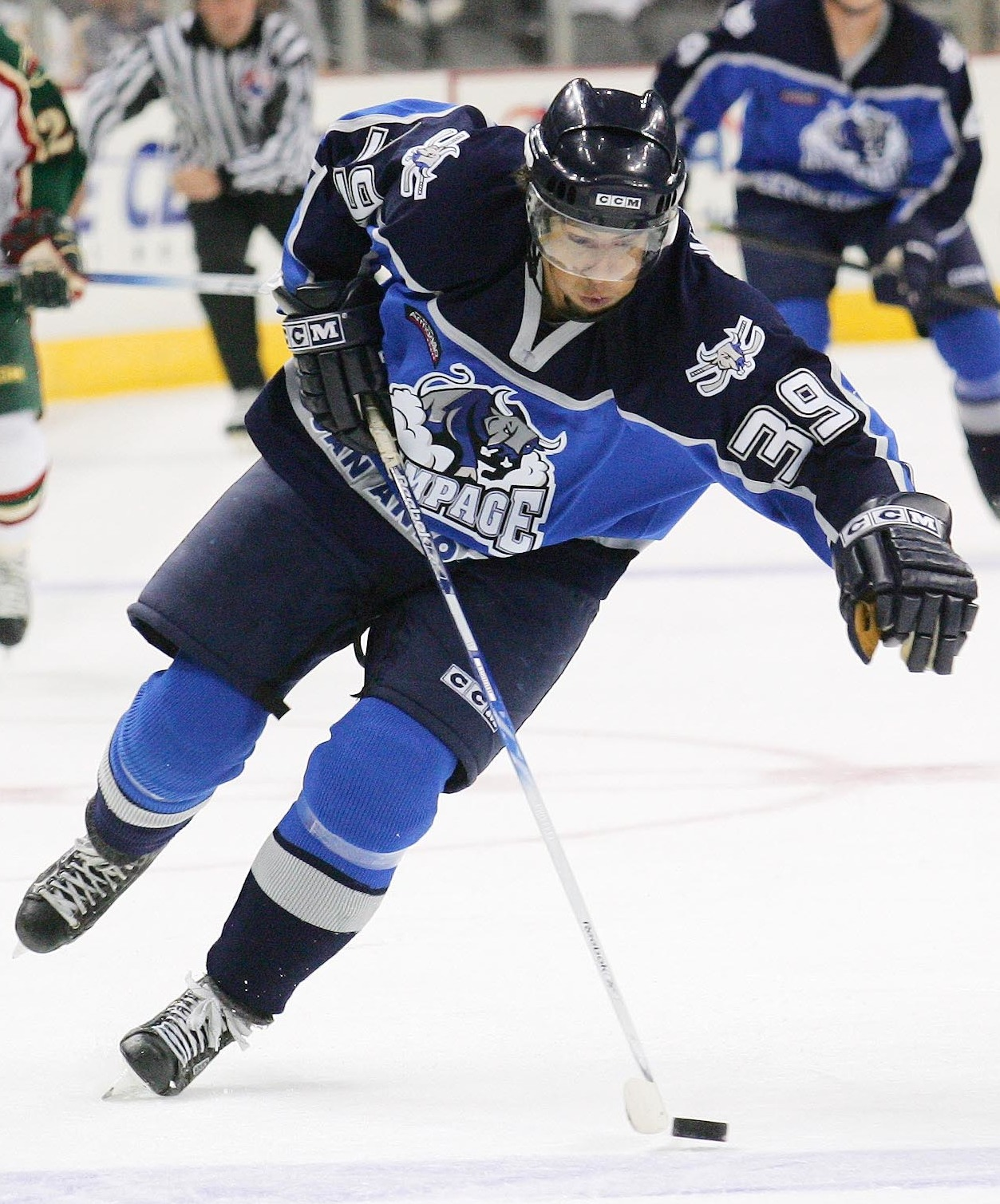
- Dickenson with the San Antonio Rampage in 2004
- Born: 15 August 1982 (age 43) Orleans, Ontario, Canada
- Height: 6 ft 1 in (185 cm)
- Weight: 205 lb (93 kg; 14 st 9 lb)
- Position: Left wing
- Shot: Left
- Played for: San Antonio Rampage; Bofors; Edinburgh Capitals; HDD Olimpija Ljubljana; Manitoba Moose; Hershey Bears; Pelicans; Aalborg Pirates; HC Valpellice; Rosenborg IHK; Stjernen; Herning Blue Fox; Dundee Stars
- NHL draft: 113th overall, 2000; Edmonton Oilers
- Playing career: 2004–2017

Lou Dickenson (born 15 August 1982) is a Canadian professional ice hockey player who last played for the Thetford Assurancia of the Ligue Nord-Américaine de Hockey. He was selected by the Edmonton Oilers in the fourth round (113th overall) of the 2000 NHL entry draft.

Early on in his junior career, he was labeled as a potential first round draft pick for the 2000 Draft, due to his combination of speed, size and skill. Unfortunately, being on dismal Mississauga IceDogs teams hindered his development, and he fell to the 4th round, drafted by the Edmonton Oilers. Dickenson played in the American Hockey League with the San Antonio Rampage before embarking on a European career.

On 15 July 2015, having left Herning Blue Fox of the Danish Metal Ligaen, Dickenson agreed to a contract with Scottish club, the Dundee Stars of the EIHL after securing a placement to study at the University of Dundee.

In 2017, Dickenson co-founded a hockey training program in Ottawa named Lou Dickenson Elite Performance Hockey, which offers one on one coaching for hockey players.

== Personal life ==
In 2011, Dickenson married Swedish-born Alexandra and they had two children together in Europe before moving back to Canada in 2016.

== Career statistics ==
			Regular season					Playoffs
Season	Team	League	GP	G	A	Pts	PIM	GP	G	A	Pts	PIM
1998–99	Mississauga IceDogs	OHL	62	19	27	46	12	—	—	—	—	—
1999–2000	Mississauga IceDogs	OHL	66	21	25	46	46	—	—	—	—	—
2000–01	London Knights	OHL	35	12	13	25	23	—	—	—	—	—
2000–01	Kingston Frontenacs	OHL	25	4	6	10	10	4	1	0	1	4
2001–02	Kingston Frontenacs	OHL	37	10	21	31	37	—	—	—	—	—
2001–02	Guelph Storm	OHL	26	3	19	22	13	9	1	5	6	4
2002–03	Guelph Storm	OHL	32	15	11	26	20	—	—	—	—	—
2002–03	Ottawa 67's	OHL	30	6	15	21	16	23	2	12	14	23
2003–04	St. Thomas University	AUS	11	3	3	6	6	—	—	—	—	—
2004–05	San Antonio Rampage	AHL	17	1	0	1	12	—	—	—	—	—
2004–05	Texas Wildcatters	ECHL	26	5	11	16	12	—	—	—	—	—
2004–05	Laredo Bucks	CHL	20	6	6	12	14	16	6	7	13	6
2005–06	SV Kaltern	ITA.2	32	35	30	65	40	9	8	7	15	22
2006–07	Bofors IK	Allsv	7	0	2	2	10	—	—	—	—	—
2006–07	Karlskoga HC	SWE.4	3	4	3	7	8	—	—	—	—	—
2006–07	Edinburgh Capitals	EIHL	22	12	11	23	10	—	—	—	—	—
2006–07	HDD Olimpija Ljubljana	SVN	13	11	9	20	22	5	2	2	4	12
2007–08	Gwinnett Gladiators	ECHL	56	28	34	62	30	3	0	2	2	2
2007–08	Manitoba Moose	AHL	3	0	0	0	0	—	—	—	—	—
2007–08	Hershey Bears	AHL	6	0	0	0	0	—	—	—	—	—
2008–09	KooKoo	Mestis	43	28	19	47	61	1	0	1	1	0
2009–10	Sport	Mestis	44	26	35	61	30	4	0	3	3	4
2010–11	Pelicans	SM-liiga	28	3	1	4	32	—	—	—	—	—
2010–11	HeKi	Mestis	2	0	1	1	0	—	—	—	—	—
2010–11	AaB Ishockey	DEN	7	9	2	11	4	4	2	1	3	12
2011–12	AaB Ishockey	DEN	27	11	18	29	20	—	—	—	—	—
2011–12	HC Valpellice	ITA	14	6	9	15	6	5	2	1	3	0
2012–13	Rosenborg IHK	NOR	44	28	34	62	28	—	—	—	—	—
2013–14	Rosenborg IHK	NOR	44	22	30	52	30	4	1	3	4	0
2014–15	Stjernen Hockey	NOR	36	22	19	41	30	—	—	—	—	—
2014–15	Herning Blue Fox	DEN	5	1	4	5	6	15	3	7	10	8
2015–16	Dundee Stars	EIHL	52	25	34	59	14	2	1	2	3	0
2016–17	Cornwall Nationals	FPHL	27	20	25	45	4	—	—	—	—	—
2016–17	Thetford Assurancia	LNAH	1	1	1	2	0	—	—	—	—	—
ECHL totals			82	33	45	78	42	3	0	2	2	2
NOR totals			124	72	83	155	88	8	5	8	13	6
