= Sherbrooke Saint-François =

Canadian hockey team

- City: Sherbrooke, Quebec
- League: LNAH
- Founded: 2003
- Folded: 2011
- Home arena: Palais des Sports
- Colours: Dark blue, white, and army green

Franchise history
- 1996–2001: Windsor Papetiers
- 2001–2003: Windsor Lacroix
- 2003–2011: Sherbrooke Saint-François
- 2011–2012: Windsor Wild
- 2012–2016: Cornwall River Kings

Championships
- Regular season titles: None
- Division titles: None
- Playoff championships: 2 (2006, 2010)

The Sherbrooke Saint-François was a minor league professional ice hockey team based in Sherbrooke, Quebec. The team was part of the minor professional league Ligue Nord-Américaine de Hockey (LNAH). The Saint-Francois played at the Palais des Sports.

In the past, they were known as the Windsor Papetiers and the Windsor Lacroix. They won the Futura Cup in 2005–2006, beating the Thetford Mines Prolab in six games of a best of 7. Sherbrooke also won the season title in 2009-2010. Over the last 5 seasons, they made it to the league final 3 times.

In 2011, the franchise moved to Windsor and was renamed the Windsor Wild.
