= Timeline of Toronto history =

This timeline of the history of Toronto documents all events that occurred in Toronto, Ontario, Canada, including historical events in the former cities of East York, Etobicoke, North York, Toronto, Scarborough, and York. Events date back to the early-17th century and continue until the present in chronological order. The timeline also includes events taken place in municipalities bordering Toronto.In this timeline, the name Toronto refers to Old Toronto in events listed before 1998.

== Pre-founding of Toronto ==
| Year | Date | Events |
Pre-European
| 1450s | | Several hundred Wyandot (Huron) live in about 21 longhouses within a fortified village located in what is now North Toronto (Castlefield Avenue, just west of Avenue Road). |
| 1450s | | A large Huron-Wendat village is located on a rise of land overlooking Black Creek. |
17th century
| 1615 | | Étienne Brûlé, with 12 Huron scouts, arrives at the mouth of the Humber River on the shores of Lake Ontario as the first European to set foot in the vicinity now known as Toronto. |
| 1650s–1700 | | Teiaiagon Seneca village exists on the bank of the Humber at today's Baby Point neighbourhood |
| 1660s | | Ganatsekwyagon (Bead Hill) Seneca village exists on the bank of the lower Rouge River. |
18th century
| 1720 | | A magasin royal (fur trading post), known as Fort Douville, is established near the former site of Teiaiagon. |
| 1750 | | Fort Rouillé is established. |
| 1759 | | Fort Rouillé is destroyed by its garrison. |
| 1787 | | The Toronto Purchase occurs. |
| 1791 | | The lands of Etobicoke, York, and Scarborough are surveyed in preparation for settlement. |
| 1792 | | Joseph Bouchette is sent to Upper Canada to help survey the shores of Lake Ontario and produce maps. |
| 1793 | | Fort York is established. |
| 1793 | August 26 | York (Upper Canada) is incorporated as a township. |
| 1795 | | Etobicoke is named by John Graves Simcoe |
| 1796 | | Scarborough is named by Elizabeth Simcoe. |
| 1797 | June 1 | The first session of the parliament of York is held. |

== 19th century ==
| Year | Date | Events |
|---|---|---|
| 1803 | | St. Lawrence Market public market is established |
| 1806 | | Lambton Mills is incorporated as a village. |
| 1813 | April 27 | The Battle of York occurs. |
| 1813 | July | Second looting of York by American forces |
| 1827 | March 15 | King's College (now University of Toronto) is established. |
| 1829 | June 3 | The York General Hospital is opened as the first public hospital in York. |
| 1830 | | The York Mechanics' Institute is established. |
| 1832 | | The first post office of Scarborough is opened in Scarborough Village. |
| 1834 | March 6 | The City of Toronto is incorporated, replacing the township of York. |
| 1837 | December 7 | The Battle of Montgomery's Tavern occurs. |
| 1839 or 1840 | | The first Catholic school in Toronto is opened. |
| 1839 | December | St. James Church becomes the cathedral church of the Anglican Diocese of Toronto. |
| 1841 | December 28 | Several Toronto streets and stores illuminated by gas as a regular service for the first time. |
| 1844 | | The Globe is established. |
| 1846 | December 19 | First telegraph message transmitted from Toronto. |
| 1847 | | Wave of over 30,000 Irish Immigrants arrive in Toronto to escape the famine in Ireland. |
| 1849 | April 7 | The first Great Fire of Toronto occurs. |
| 1849 | May 30 | King's College is renamed as the University of Toronto. |
| 1849 | | The Williams Omnibus Bus Line is established as the first public transit system in Toronto. |
| 1850 | January 1 | Etobicoke is incorporated as a township. |
| 1850 | | Scarborough is incorporated as a township. |
| 1850 | | York (Canada West) is incorporated as a township. |
| 1853 | May 16 | First railway (Ontario, Simcoe and Huron) begins operation from Bay and Front St. depot. |
| 1853 | | Yorkville is incorporated as a village. |
| 1856 | October 27 | The first passenger rail service between Toronto and Montreal begins. |
| 1856 | | The Armstrong, Beere and Hime panorama is created. |
| 1858 | April 13 | The Toronto Islands sand formation modified by a storm. |
| 1858 | | The first Union Station is opened just west of York and Front Streets |
| 1861 | September 11 | Toronto Street Railway is established. |
| 1861 | October 25 | The Toronto Stock Exchange is formed. |
| 1869 | | Eaton's is established. |
| 1872 | | The Toronto Mail is established. |
| 1873 | July 1 | The second Union Station is opened. |
| 1874 | August 19 | Establishment of an official fire department is approved by the city council. |
| 1875 | March 1 | Hospital for Sick Children opens at its original site. |
| 1875 | September 26 | The Jubilee Riots occur. |
| 1875 | | The Metropolitan Street Railway is established. |
| 1879 | June 8 | Toronto's first telephone book published. |
| 1879 | September 5 | The first Canadian National Exhibition (then known as the Toronto Industrial Exhibition) is held. |
| 1883 | September 25 | Toronto Electric Light Company is established. |
| 1884 | March 6 | The Toronto Public Library officially opens following approval in 1883. |
| 1884 | | Brockton Village is annexed into Toronto. |
| 1887 | | The Toronto Empire is established. |
| 1889 | March 28 | Parkdale is annexed into Toronto. |
| 1890 | | The Toronto and Mimico Electric Railway and Light Company is established. |
| 1890 | | Toronto Railway is established. |
| 1892 | November 3 | The Evening Star is established. |
| 1892 | | The Toronto and Scarboro' Electric Railway, Light and Power Company is established. |
| 1893 | April 4 | Queen's Park and the Ontario Legislative Building opens. |
| 1894 | May 17 | The University Avenue Armoury opens. |
| 1894 | June 14 | Massey Hall opens in 1894, holding its first concert on June 14. |
| 1894 | | Toronto Suburban Railway is established. |
| 1894 | | The Toronto Mail and Toronto Empire merge to create The Mail and Empire |
| 1896 | August 31 | The first motion picture in Toronto is screened at Robinson's Musee at 81 Yonge Street. |
| 1896 | December 31 | All toll gates are abolished in York County. |
| 1897 | September 26 | Temple Building opens at Bay Street and Richmond Street as the tallest office building in Canada at the time. |
| 1899 | September 18 | The Old City Hall opens. |

== 20th century ==
| Year | Date | Events |
|---|---|---|
| 1900 | January 24 | The Evening Star is renamed as The Toronto Daily Star. |
| 1900 | | The Art Museum of Toronto opens. |
| 1903 | May 11 | King Edward Hotel opens. |
| 1904 | April 19 | The second Great Fire of Toronto occurs. |
| 1904 | December 12 | First escalator in Toronto is installed at an Eaton's store on Queen Street West. |
| 1905 | December 2 | The first Toronto Santa Claus Parade is held. |
| 1906 | November 19 | Electricity generated at Niagara Falls begins to be supplied to Toronto. |
| 1906 | | The Toronto Professional Hockey Club is established as the first professional ice hockey team in Toronto. |
| 1909 | September 1 | A fire damages the west wing of the Ontario Legislative Building, destroying the Legislative Library. |
| 1909 | October 28 | The Central Reference Library opens at the intersection of College Street and St. George Street. |
| 1909 | December 4 | The first Grey Cup game is held at Rosedale Field. |
| 1911 | | The Toronto Blueshirts are established. |
| 1912 | October 7 | The Arena Gardens (later known as Mutual Street Arena) opens as the largest auditorium in Canada with the first artificial ice rink in Ontario. |
| 1912 | | Toronto Civic Railways is established. |
| 1913 | June 13 | The Toronto General Hospital relocates to its present site at College Street. |
| 1913 | | Queen Mary Hospital for Consumptive Children opened, the first hospital in the world dedicated to tuberculosis in children. |
| 1914 | March 11 | The Toronto Blueshirts win the first Stanley Cup by a Toronto team. |
| 1914 | March 19 | The Royal Ontario Museum opens. |
| 1914 | | "Ranelagh Park" estate home, later to be the Guild Inn opens. |
| 1915 | November 15 | Chorley Park, Ontario's fourth and last Government House, opens. |
| 1916 | September 16 | The Ontario Temperance Act takes effect. |
| 1917 | | The Toronto Blueshirts are renamed as the Torontos. |
| 1918 | March 30 | The Torontos are renamed as the Toronto Arenas. |
| 1918 | October 18 | The Prince Edward Viaduct officially opens. |
| 1919 | December 8 | A statue of Timothy Eaton is unveiled on Queen Street West. |
| 1919 | | The Art Museum of Toronto is renamed as Art Gallery of Toronto. |
| 1919 | | The Toronto Arenas are renamed as the Toronto St. Patricks. |
| 1920 | August 28 | The Pantages Theatre opens as Canada's largest theatre. |
| 1921 | September 1 | The Toronto Transportation Commission is established. |
| 1921 | December 16 | The Coliseum opens on the Exhibition grounds. |
| 1922 | June 13 | North York is incorporated as a township. |
| 1922 | June 28 | Sunnyside Amusement Park opens. |
| 1922 | November 22 | The first Royal Agricultural Winter Fair opens. |
| 1923 | February 8 | First radio broadcast of an ice hockey game is made from Arena Gardens. |
| 1924 | January 1 | East York is incorporated as a township. |
| 1924 | July 19 | Telephone system begins switch from manual to automatic dialing. |
| 1925 | June 10 | Arena Gardens hosts a worship service inaugurating The United Church of Canada. |
| 1925 | July 29 | Sunnyside Pool opens at Sunnyside Amusement Park as the largest outdoor pool in the world. |
| 1925 | August 8 | First automatic traffic signal begins operation at the intersection of Yonge Street and Bloor Street. |
| 1926 | April 29 | Maple Leaf Stadium opens as the Fleet Street Baseball Stadium. |
| 1927 | February 14 | The Toronto St. Patricks renamed as the Toronto Maple Leafs. |
| 1927 | June 1 | First liquor stores in Toronto open following repeal of the Ontario Temperance Act. |
| 1927 | August 6 | The new (present-day) Union Station is open. |
| 1927 | August 30 | Edward, Prince of Wales and Prince George inaugurate the new Princes' Gates at the Exhibition Grounds |
| 1928 | November 3 | First sound film in Toronto is shown at the Uptown Theatre. |
| 1929 | June 11 | The Fairmont Royal York is opened as the Royal York Hotel. |
| 1929 | October 29 | The Toronto Stock Exchange suffers its worst loss in history. |
| 1930 | January 21 | Cross Waterfront Railway Viaduct opens to elevate tracks from York Street to Queen Street West. |
| 1931 | January 31 | Commerce Court North opens as the tallest building in the British Commonwealth. |
| 1931 | June 4 | The intersection of College Street-Carlton Street and Yonge Street opened. |
| 1931 | November 12 | Maple Leaf Gardens opens with hockey game between the Toronto Maple Leafs and Chicago Black Hawks. |
| 1933 | July 11 | Anti-fascism march, from Bathurst and Wellington Streets, to Queen's Park. |
| 1933 | August 16 | Christie Pits riot occurs. |
| 1934 | | Fort York Guard created. |
| 1934 | March 6 | Centennial of the City of Toronto |
| 1936 | | The Globe and The Mail and Empire merge to create The Globe and Mail. |
| 1938 | August 29 | Malton Airport opens. |
| 1939 | February 4 | Toronto Island airport opens. |
| 1939 | May 22 | King George VI and Queen Elizabeth The Queen Mother visit, marking the first visit of a reigning monarch to Toronto. The island airport is renamed Port George VI Island Airport in honour of the visit |
| 1939 | June 7 | Queen Elizabeth Way (QEW) between Toronto and Niagara Falls, Ontario is opened. |
| 1944 | December 12 | The Great Snowstorm, the worst winter storm in Toronto's history, ends with nine deaths and 57 cm of snow. |
| 1947 | April 3 | The Silver Rail opens as the first bar licensed by the LCBO. |
| 1947 | June 19 | Trolley bus service is re-introduced, 52 years after the closure of a single, relatively short-lived route in the 1920s. |
| 1949 | January 18 | Conversion of hydro in Ontario to 60 cycles from 25 cycles begins. |
| 1949 | September 17 | SS Noronic burns at the Toronto Harbour resulting in 118 fatalities. |
| 1951 | August 9 | Canada Life Building's weather beacon begins operation. |
| 1951 | October 11 | The future Queen, Princess Elizabeth and husband Prince Philip visit Toronto as part of a cross-Canada tour. |
| 1951 | December 1 | The Toronto-Barrie Highway opens. |
| 1952 | July 1 | The Toronto-Barrie Highway is renamed as Highway 400 |
| 1952 | September 8 | Ontario's first television station, CBLT, begins broadcasting in Toronto. |
| 1952 | November 1 | First English broadcast of Hockey Night in Canada is televised from Maple Leaf Gardens. |
| 1953 | January 20 | The Metropolitan Toronto School Board, a school board with a federation of 11 school boards, is formed. |
| 1954 | January 1 | Metropolitan Toronto is created. |
| 1954 | March 30 | The Yonge subway line opens as the first rapid transit line in Canada. |
| 1954 | September 9 | Marilyn Bell becomes the first person to swim across Lake Ontario. |
| 1954 | October 15 | Hurricane Hazel affects Toronto and kills a total of 81 people in Ontario. |
| 1956 | August 24 | Highway 401's last section in Toronto from Bayview Avenue to Highway 2 opens. |
| 1958 | August 8 | The Gardiner Expressway from Humber River to Jameson Avenue opens. |
| 1960 | October 1 | The O'Keefe Centre opens. |
| 1961 | August 3 | The Don Valley Parkway's first phase, from Bloor Street to Eglinton Avenue opens. |
| 1964 | February 26 | The Yorkdale Shopping Centre opens. |
| 1965 | September 13 | The Toronto City Hall and Nathan Phillips Square open. |
| 1965 | November 10 | Northeast Blackout of 1965 occurs. |
| 1966 | February 25 | The Bloor-Danforth subway line (Line 2) opens. |
| 1966 | October 21 | The Spadina Expressway opens. |
| 1967 | May 2 | The Toronto Maple Leafs win the Stanley Cup, their most recent win. |
| 1967 | May 23 | GO Transit is established. |
| 1967 | July 1 | Official opening of 56-storey Toronto-Dominion Bank Tower. |
| 1967 | | Etobicoke, East York, North York, Scarborough, and York are incorporated as boroughs. |
| 1968 | October 28 | The McLaughlin Planetarium opens. |
| 1969 | September 26 | The Ontario Science Centre opens. |
| 1970 | July 5 | The Air Canada Flight 621 accident occurs as the deadliest aviation incident in Toronto. |
| 1971 | May 22 | Ontario Place opens. |
| 1971 | June 3 | The Spadina Expressway project into downtown is cancelled to go no further than Eglinton Avenue. |
| 1971 | November 6 | The Toronto Daily Star is renamed as The Toronto Star. |
| 1972 | | Toronto's first Gay Pride Week is held. It includes a dance, film night, and march to Queen's Park. |
| 1973 | May 2 | The Scarborough Town Centre opens. |
| 1974 | August 15 | Toronto Zoo opens (originally called Metro Toronto Zoo). |
| 1974 | October 26 | Art Gallery of Ontario relocates to its present site on Dundas Street. |
| 1975 | May 18 | The First Canadian Place opens as the tallest building in the Commonwealth of Nations. |
| 1975 | | The 519 Church Street Community Centre is established. The 519 provides services to LGBTQ2S people. |
| 1976 | February 11 | The Toronto Eaton Centre opens. |
| 1976 | June 26 | The CN Tower opens as the tallest freestanding structure in the world. |
| 1976 | August 3 | The opening ceremony of the 1976 Summer Paralympics is held at the Woodbine Racetrack. |
| 1976 | November 2 | Toronto Reference Library relocates to its present site at the intersection of Bloor Street and Yonge Street. |
| 1976 | | The first Toronto International Film Festival is held (originally called the Festival of Festivals) |
| 1979 | | North York is incorporated as a city. |
| 1981 | February 5 | Police raid four gay bathhouses in Operation Soap and arrest 286 people. The next day over 3,000 people demonstrate against the raids. Smaller raids and protests continue through 1981. |
| 1981 | May 23 | Canada's Wonderland opens. |
| 1982 | September 13 | The Roy Thomson Hall opens. |
| 1983 | | Etobicoke, Scarborough, and York are incorporated as cities. |
| 1984 | October 2 | The Metro Toronto Convention Centre opens. |
| 1985 | March 22 | The Scarborough RT line opens. |
| 1988 | March | Canada's first stand-alone treatment facility for people with HIV/AIDS, Casey House opens its doors. |
| 1989 | June 5 | Rogers Centre opens (originally known as SkyDome). |
| 1991 | | The 1991 Toronto bomb plot is revealed. |
| 1992 | May 4 | A riot occurs after a protest march after the police shooting of Raymond Lawrence, a young black man. |
| 1992 | October 24 | The Toronto Blue Jays win the 1992 World Series. |
| 1993 | May 23 | The Princess of Wales Theatre opens. |
| 1993 | July 16 | The last trolley bus service ends. |
| 1993 | October 23 | The Toronto Blue Jays win the 1993 World Series, their most recent win. |
| 1995 | August 11 | The Russell Hill subway accident occurs. |
| 1998 | January 1 | East York, Etobicoke, North York, Scarborough, Old Toronto, York and Metro Toronto are amalgamated into the new City of Toronto. |
| 1999 | February 19 | The Air Canada Centre opens. |

== 21st century ==
| Year | Date | Events |
|---|---|---|
| 2002 | November 22 | The Sheppard Subway Line opens. |
| 2002 | | Toronto hosts World Youth Day. |
| 2003 | April 24 | 2003 Etobicoke gas explosion occurs. |
| 2003 | August 14 | Northeast Blackout of 2003 occurs. |
| 2005 | August 2 | The Air France Flight 358 accident occurs. |
| 2005 | December 26 | The Boxing Day shooting occurs. |
| 2006 | June 2 | The 2006 Toronto terrorism plot is thwarted. |
| 2006 | June 14 | The Four Seasons Centre for the Performing Arts opens. |
| 2007 | July 1 | Toronto hosts its first match of the 2007 FIFA U-20 World Cup at the National Soccer Stadium. |
| 2008 | August 10 | 2008 Toronto propane explosion occurs. |
| 2010 | June 8 | Final resolution of Toronto Purchase between Government of Canada and Mississaugas |
| 2010 | June 26 | 2010 G-20 Toronto summit is held at the Metro Toronto Convention Centre. |
| 2010 | September 12 | Opening of TIFF Bell Lightbox permanent home for Toronto International Film Festival. |
| 2011 | June 25 | 12th International Indian Film Academy Awards are held at the Rogers Centre. |
| 2012 | July 16 | Two people are killed and 22 wounded in the Danzig Street shooting. |
| 2014 | June 20 to 29 | WorldPride is held in the city. |
| 2014 | August 31 | Flexity Outlook streetcars begin revenue service, debuting on Route 510 Spadina. |
| 2014 | September 18 | Aga Khan Museum is established. |
| 2015 | January 25 | The Guvernment nightclub closes. |
| 2015 | June 6 | Union Pearson Express opens to connect Pearson Airport to Union Station. |
| 2015 | July 4 | Luminous Veil on Prince Edward Viaduct is unveiled. |
| 2015 | July 10–26 | Toronto hosts 2015 Pan American Games. |
| 2015 | July 30 | Pedestrian tunnel to the Billy Bishop Toronto City Airport opens. |
| 2015 | August 7–15 | Toronto hosts 2015 Parapan American Games. |
| 2016 | December 31 | Honest Ed's closes. |
| 2017 | September 20–23 | Toronto hosts the Invictus Games. |
| 2017 | December 9 | Toronto FC win the MLS Cup. |
| 2017 | December 17 | The Line 1 Yonge–University subway extension opens. |
| 2018 | April 23 | 10 people are killed and 16 wounded in a vehicle ramming attack on Yonge Street in North York. |
| 2018 | July 22 | Two people are killed and 13 wounded in the Danforth shooting. |
| 2019 | April 1 | The first legal marijuana store opens in Toronto, six months after legalization of marijuana. |
| 2019 | June 13 | The Toronto Raptors win the 2019 NBA Finals against the Golden State Warriors in Oakland, California. |
| 2020 | March 23 | State of emergency declared in Toronto by mayor John Tory, amid the COVID-19 pandemic in Ontario. |
| 2022 | December 18 | Killing of Ken Lee. |
| 2023 | June 26 | Olivia Chow, a former city councillor and member of Parliament (MP), is elected mayor following Tory's resignation. |
| 2023 | July 24 | Line 3 Scarborough ceases operations. |
| 2024 | June 21 | The Ontario Science Centre building closes. |
| 2024 | November 17 | The Toronto Argonauts win the 111th Grey Cup in Vancouver, British Columbia. This is their most recent win. |
| 2025 | December 7 | Line 6 Finch West opens to the public. |
| 2026 | February 8 | Line 5 Eglinton opens to the public. |
| 2026 | June 12 | Canada's opening match at the FIFA World Cup is held at BMO Field, with Canada co-hosting the event. |

== See also ==
- List of years in Canada
