= Christopher William Bunting =

Canadian politician (1837–1896)

Member of the Canadian Parliament for Welland
- In office 1878–1882
- Preceded by: William Alexander Thomson
- Succeeded by: John Ferguson

Personal details
- Born: 1 September 1837 Amigan, Limerick, Ireland
- Died: 14 January 1896 (aged 58) Toronto, Ontario
- Party: Liberal-Conservative
- Occupation: merchant, newspaper owner, newspaper publisher

Christopher William Bunting (1 September 1837 – 14 January 1896) was an Irish-born politician, merchant, newspaper owner and newspaper publisher.

Born in Amigan, Limerick, Ireland, he was the son of William Bunting and Jane Crowe and came to Canada West with his mother and sister in 1850 after the death of his father. Bunting worked as a compositor at The Globe, later becoming a foreman. He then worked for eleven years in the wholesale grocery business. In 1868, he married Mary Elizabeth Ellis.

In 1877, in partnership with John Riordon, he became co-owner of The Toronto Mail. The partners gained control of the Toronto Empire in 1895 and amalgamated the two papers to form The Mail and Empire.

Bunting was elected to the House of Commons of Canada as a Member of the Liberal-Conservatives in the 1878 election to represent the riding of Welland. He was defeated in the 1882 election in the riding of Durham West under an unknown political affiliation.

Bunting died in Toronto of Bright's disease at the age of 58.

1878 Canadian federal election: Welland
Party	Candidate	Votes	%	±%
Liberal–Conservative	Christopher William Bunting	1,926	51.6	
Unknown	H. Edwin	1,810	48.4	
Total valid votes		3,736	100.0	
