= Anson McKim =

Canadian businessman (1855–1917)

Anson McKim (May 2, 1855 – January 26, 1917) was a Canadian businessman, publisher, and pioneer in the field of advertising. In January 1889, he founded A. McKim Advertising Agency Limited, which quickly became one the first and most influential advertising agencies in Canada. He has been recognised one of the founding figures of advertising in Canada.

== Background ==
McKim's family history traces back to the 1774 when his grandfather, James McKim, emigrated from Ireland to New York to start a farming life. However, at this time the American Revolution sparked driving James McKim to join the local British Forces. In his late 30s, he was taken prisoner at the Battle of Bennington but and was later returned to his unit after the war ended.

After the war, James McKim relocated to Sorel, Quebec, where he and his family settled. His son, John McKim, was born and grew up in Ernestown Township, located in eastern Ontario, a place where later, he married Jane Shibley. Together, they had ten children, including their fourth child, Anson McKim, who was born on May 2, 1855. Growing up on the family farm, Anson received his education through local schools however, he left school at a young age to pursue a career in journalism at the Toronto newspaper, the Mail, and was later transferred to the newspaper's Montreal offices on May 22, 1879, where he assumed responsibilities for managing advertisements and subscriptions for both the daily and weekly editions, tasks that, motivated him to later open his own advertising agency

Anson McKim passed away on the morning of January 26, 1917, in an attempt to transfer to another train route.

== Professional Achievements ==
Anson McKim started his professional life as an employee of the Conservative Toronto newspaper, The Toronto Mail, where he was employed until May 22, 1879. After this day, he was transferred to the newspaper's Montreal offices. In this location he was able to take on responsibilities of head of advertisements and subscriptions for the daily editions for the "Montreal News", later called "Montreal Affairs".

After realizing the potential economic impact newspaper's advertisement could have, McKim took on to the responsibility of pacing advertisement in more dailies across the country which drove him to later found his own advertising agency A. McKim and Company in January 1889.

This advertising agency was widely recognized during the beginning of the 1900s reaching its 1590th corporate client in 1905, their clientele varied across Canada and the United States. Later in that decade, McKim partnered with three investors to form the A. McKim Advertising agency Limited that had agencies in Toronto, Winnipeg, other Canadian centres, and London, England

== Legacy ==
Following Anson McKim's death, A. McKim and Company continued operations and established its headquarters in Winnipeg in 1911. In 2021, the agency merged with Sherpa Marketing and began operating under the joint name McKim.Sherpa for two years. In 2023, the firm rebranded as The Show and Tell Agency.
