= The Mail Building (Toronto) =

Coordinates: 43.6489°N 79.3808°W

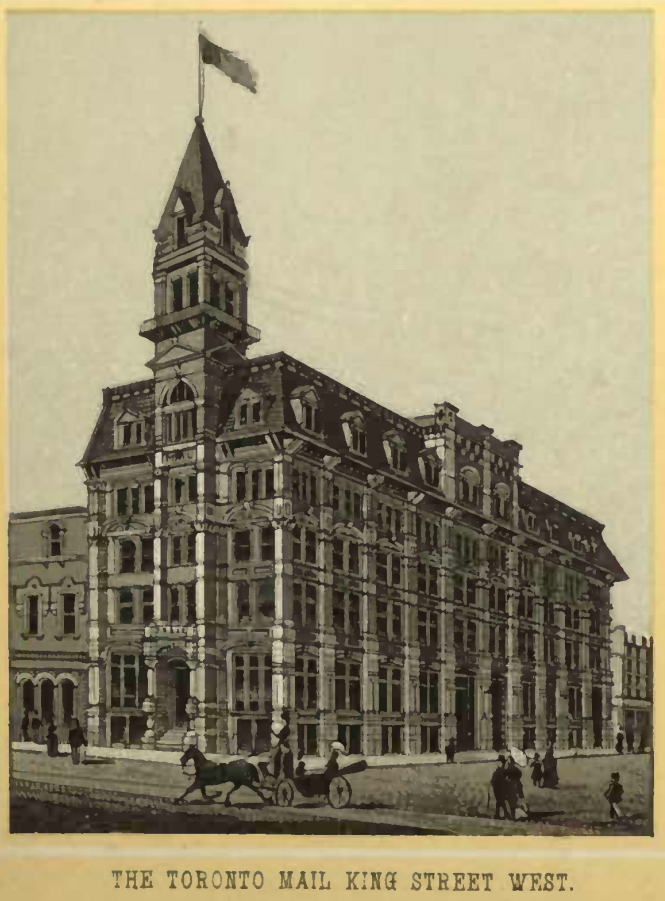
The Mail Building

The Mail Building, later known as the Mail and Empire Building was built in the 1870s and designed by Richard A. Waite. The building served as the home to the newspaper The Toronto Mail (later merged with the Empire to form The Mail and Empire) and was situated at the northwest corner of Bay Street and King Street West. It was damaged by a serious fire in 1884, but fully repaired. The 4 storey building was topped with a 5-storey spire.

The building was sold for $600,000 in May 1938. A month later, its demolition was announced. The building was demolished in 1939 and replaced with a new Bank of Montreal building. The podium of First Canadian Place stands on the original site.

== See also ==
- Old Toronto Star Building
- Old Globe and Mail Building
