= History of Toronto =

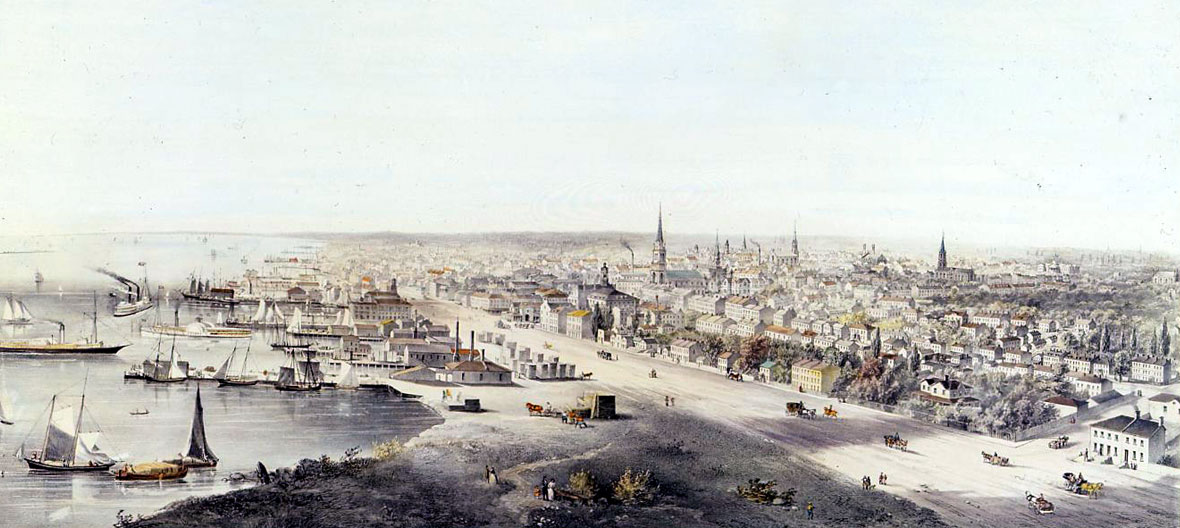
View of Toronto in 1854

Toronto, Canada's largest city, was founded as the Town of York and capital of Upper Canada in 1793 after the Mississaugas sold the land to the British in the Toronto Purchase. For over 12,000 years, Indigenous People have lived in the Toronto area. The ancestors of the Huron-Wendat were the first known groups to establish agricultural villages in the area about 1,600 years ago.

In the 17th century, the Toronto Carrying-Place Trail along the Humber River became a strategic site for controlling the fur trade farther north. The Seneca people established a village of about 2,000 people known as Teiaiagon along the trail. The French set up trading posts in the area, including Fort Rouillé in 1751, which they abandoned as the British conquered French North America in the Seven Years' War.

In the 1790s the British began to settle Toronto and built the garrison which became Fort York at the entrance to Toronto Harbour. The Americans attacked the village and garrison during the War of 1812. In the decades after the war, tensions between the colony's conservative elite, the Family Compact and the democratic Reformers grew and culminated in the Rebellions of 1837-1838.

After the failed rebellion, the Orange Order, a conservative Protestant fraternal organization, became the dominant power in local politics in a city intensely dedicated to Britishness. However, the city was not exclusively British. Many Irish Catholics settled in the city following the Great Irish Famine. The city was also a terminus of the Underground Railroad. Thousands of Black Americans who escaped slavery settled in Toronto before the American Civil War.

In the second half of the 19th century, Toronto grew into an important regional centre, linked to the rest of Ontario by a growing railway network and American and British markets by its port. By 1914, the city's financial sector, profiting from a mining boom in northern Ontario, was competing nationally with Montreal, while American corporations were increasingly choosing Toronto for branch offices.

World War I and World War II tremendously impacted the city, with tens of thousands of residents volunteering to fight and participating locally in a "total war" effort.

After World War II, another major influx of immigrants came to the region. The Province of Ontario formed a regional government, Metropolitan Toronto, encompassing Toronto and its suburbs in 1954. The Governments invested heavily in infrastructure facilitating a boom in population and industry. In the second half of the 20th century, Toronto surpassed Montreal as Canada's largest city and became the economic capital of Canada and one of the most multicultural cities in the world. In 1998, the Province of Ontario amalgamated the metropolitan governments and its suburbs into one unified municipality.

== Etymology ==
"Toronto" was originally used on maps dating to the late 17th and early 18th century to refer to Lake Simcoe and the portage route to it. Eventually, the name was brought down to the mouth of the Humber River, which is where the present City of Toronto is situated. The bay serves as the end of the Toronto Carrying-Place Trail portage route from Lake Simcoe and Georgian Bay.

The word is likely derived from the Mohawk word Tkaronto, meaning "where there are trees standing in the water", which originally referred to The Narrows, near present-day Orillia. People who had lived there prior to the Mohawk drove stakes into the water to create fishing weirs. French maps from the 1680s to 1760s identify present-day Lake Simcoe as "Lac de Taronto". The spelling changed to "Toronto" during the 18th century. As the portage route grew in use, the name became more widely used and was eventually attached to a French trading fort just inland from Lake Ontario on the Humber.

Confusion about the name of location may also be attributed to the succession of First Nations peoples who lived in the area, including the Neutral, Seneca, Mohawk, Cayuga and Wendat nations. It has also been speculated that the name origin is the Seneca word Giyando, meaning "on the other side", which was the place where the Humber River narrows at the foot of the pass to the village of Teiaiagon.

From August 1793 to March 1834, the settlement was known as "York", sharing the same name as the county it was situated in. The settlement was renamed when Lieutenant Governor John Graves Simcoe called for the town to be named after the Prince Frederick, Duke of York and Albany. To differentiate from York in England and New York, the town was informally known as "Little York". In 1804, settler Angus MacDonald petitioned the Parliament of Upper Canada to restore the original name of the area, but this was rejected. The town changed its name back to "Toronto" when it was incorporated into a city.

== Early history ==
=== Lithic and Archaic periods (9,000 BCE to 1000 BCE) ===
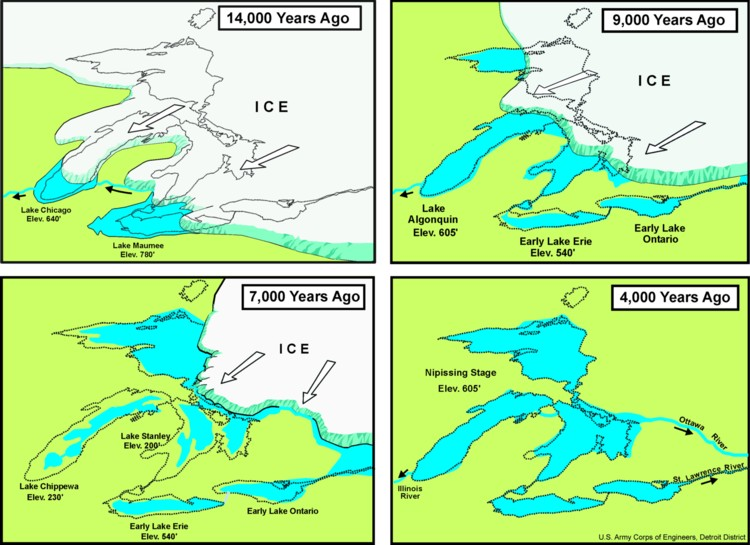
Development of the Great Lakes following the end of the Last Glacial Period. The first human settlers arrived in the area 11,000 to 10,500 years ago, as the glaciers retreated from the area.

Toronto remained under glacial ice throughout the Last Glacial Period, with the glacial ice retreating from the area during the Late Glacial warming period approximately 13,000 BCE. Following the Last Glacial Period, Toronto's waterfront shifted with the growth, and later contraction of glacial Lake Iroquois. The area saw its first human settlers around 9000 BCE to 8,500 BCE. These settlers traversed large distances in family-sized bands, sustaining themselves on caribou, mammoths, mastodons, and smaller animals in the tundra and Boreal forest. Many of their archaeological remains lie in present-day Lake Ontario, with the historic coastline of Lake Iroquois situated 12 miles (20 km) south of Toronto during this period.

As the climate warmed in 6,000 BCE, the environment of Toronto shifted from subarctic to a temperate continental climate. The Toronto waterfront also changed dramatically during this period, with erosion from the Scarborough Bluffs accumulating, and rising water levels from Lake Ontario creating a peninsula that would later become the Toronto Islands.

=== Formative to Classic stage (1000 BCE to 1200) ===
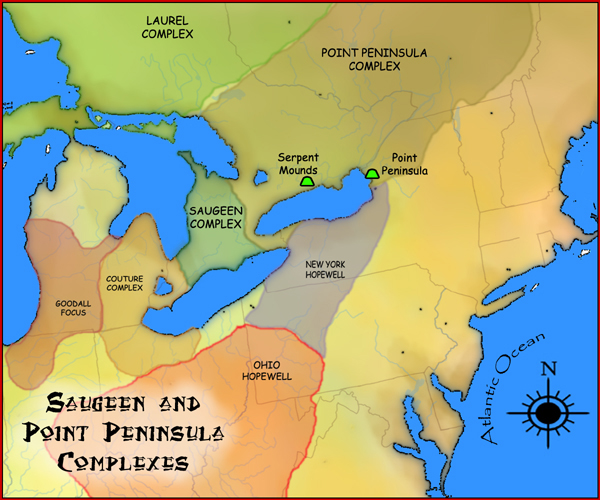
Hopewell Interaction Area around the eastern Great Lakes during the Middle Woodland period (100 BCE to 500). Present-day Toronto was situated in the Point Peninsula local expression of the Hopewellian exchange system.

First Nations fishing camps were established around the waterways of Toronto as early as 1,000 BCE. By 500 CE, up to 500 people lived along each of the three major rivers of Toronto (Don, Humber, and Rouge River). Early on, First Nations communities had developed trails and water routes in the Toronto area. These led from northern and western Canada to the Gulf of Mexico. One trail, known as the "Toronto Passage", followed the Humber River northward as an important overland shortcut between Lake Ontario and the upper Great Lakes.

New crops, including corn, sunflowers, and tobacco, were introduced into the area from the south around 600 CE. The introduction of these crops saw large societal shifts in the area; including a change in diet, and the formation of semi-permanent villages, in order to farm these crops. Inhabitants of these semi-permanent villages moved out during parts of the year to hunt, fish, and gather other goods to supplement their farming. The earliest known Iroquoian semi-permanent settlement of this nature dates to around 900 CE. Iroquoian villages during this period were located on high, fortified grounds, with access to wetlands and waterways to facilitate hunting, fishing, trade, and military operations. Their villages typically stood in place for around 10 to 20 years, before the inhabitants relocated to a new site. Typically these villages would cycle through a number of sites but return to the same areas repeatedly. This lessened the impact on surrounding flora and fauna, allowing hunting and agriculture to be utilized in a sustainable fashion.

=== Post-classic stage (1200–1700) ===
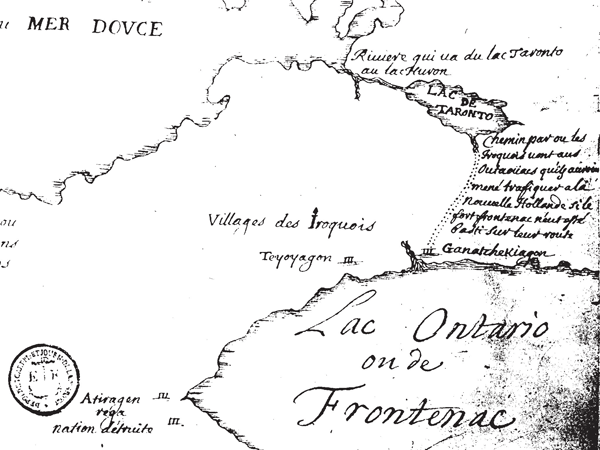
A map of the region, with Ganatsekwyagon and other areas highlighted along the Rouge Trail, c. 1673. Teiaiagon is shown west Ganatsekwyagon.

Several Iroquoian villages dating back to the 1200s have been excavated in Toronto, including an ossuary in Scarborough. From the 1300s to the 1500s, the Iroquoian inhabitants of the area migrated north of Toronto, joining the developing Huron-Wendat Confederacy. During this period, the Huron-Wendat confederacy used Toronto as a hinterland for hunting, with the Toronto Passage continuing to see use as a north–south route. The northeast portion of Toronto also held two 14th-century Iroquoian burial mounds, known today as Taber Hill.

Although Europeans did not visit Southern Ontario in the 16th century, European goods had begun to make its way into the region as early as the late-1500s. During the 17th century, nearly half of Southern Ontario's First Nations population was wiped out from as a result of the transmission of communicable diseases between Europeans and First Nations groups. The population loss, along with the desire to secure furs for trade, saw the Haudenosaunee Confederacy to the south invade the area and attack the Huron-Wendat Confederacy. The Haudenosaunee ultimately defeated the Huron-Wendat in the mid-1600s, and the Huron-Wendat fled as refugees, were killed or were forcibly adopted into the Haudenosaunee. After the Haudenosaunee secured the region, they established several settlements on the north shore of Lake Ontario. The Seneca (one of the five Haudenosaunee nations), established two settlements in present-day Toronto, Teiaiagon, near the Humber River, and Ganatsekwyagon near the Rouge River. The two communities provided the Haudenosaunee control of the north–south passage in Toronto. Roman Catholic missionaries visited the two settlements in the 1660s and 1670s. The two Seneca settlements were abandoned by 1687.

After the Haudenosaunee left, the Mississaugas moved in and established villages in the area in the late 17th century.

=== Early European settlement (1600s–1793) ===
==== French explorers and traders ====
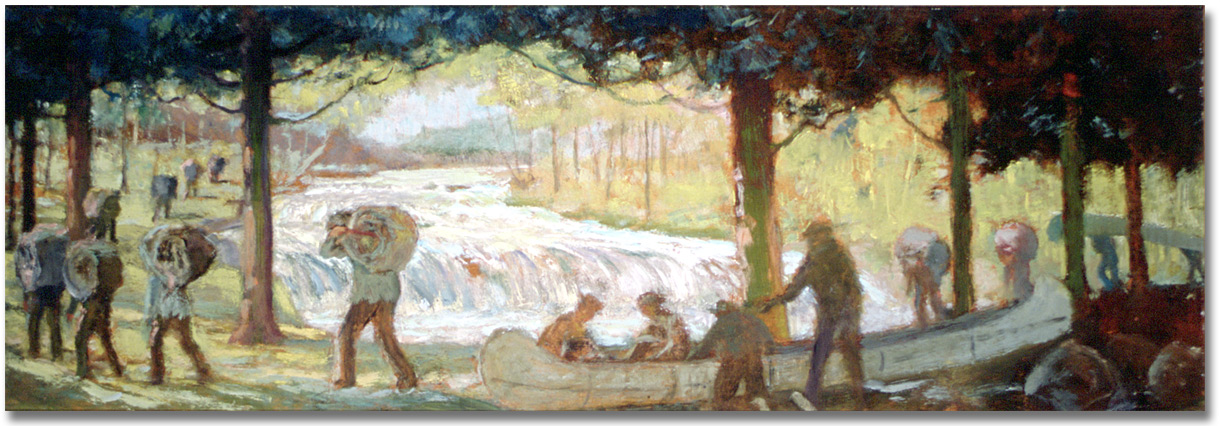
In the 17th century, the area was a crucial point for travel, with the Humber and Rouge River providing a shortcut to the upper Great Lakes. These routes were known as the Toronto Passage.

The first European to set foot on the shores of Lake Ontario in the vicinity of what is now Toronto may have been French explorer Étienne Brûlé, taking the Toronto Passage from Huronia in 1615; although the claim is disputed by several scholars, who suggest that Brûlé took a more westerly route and reached Lake Erie, as opposed to Lake Ontario. However, Europeans were active in the Toronto area by the 1660s, with missionaries visiting First Nations settlements in the area.

By the 18th century, Toronto became an important location for French fur traders, given its proximity to the Toronto Passage. In 1720, Captain Alexandre Dagneau established Fort Douville on the Humber River, near the shore of Lake Ontario. The trading post was built to divert First Nations traders from British trading posts to the south of Toronto. The success of Fort Douville prompted the British to build a larger trading post in Oswego, New York. The completion of Fort Oswego in 1726 led the French to abandon their first trading post in Toronto.

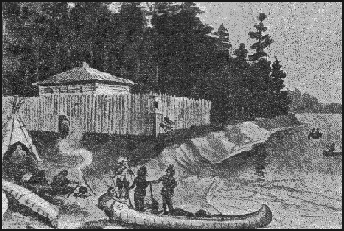
Fort Rouillé was one of several French trading posts established in Toronto during the 1750s. The forts were abandoned in 1759 as a result of the Seven Years' War.

The French established another trading post in 1750 on the Humber River. It was successful enough to encourage the French to establish Fort Rouillé, at present-day Exhibition Place in 1751. After the British captured Fort Niagara in July 1759, Fort Rouillé was destroyed by its French occupants, who withdrew to Montreal. In 1760, Robert Rogers, with an armed force of two hundred men and a flotilla of fifteen whaleboats came to secure the Toronto area for the British. The Treaty of Paris of 1763 formally ended the Seven Years' War and saw New France ceded to the British. This included the Pays d'en Haut region of New France, the area containing present-day Toronto.

==== Influx of loyalist settlers ====
European settlement in the western half of the colony of Quebec was limited before 1775, amounting to only a few families in the area. However, in the aftermath of the American Revolutionary War, the area saw an influx of settlers, known as the United Empire Loyalists; American colonists who either refused to accept being divorced from the Crown, or who felt unwelcome in the new republic of the United States. A number of loyalists fled from the United States to the mostly unsettled lands north of Lake Erie and Lake Ontario; some had fought in the British Army and were paid with land in the region.

These early immigrants originated from the midland region of the United States. They valued pluralism, were organized around the middle class, were suspicious of top-down government interventions, and were politically moderate. It has been argued that these immigrants' attitudes laid the foundation for Southern Ontario's (and by extension Toronto's) existing pluralistic and politically moderate culture.

In 1786, Lord Dorchester arrived in Quebec City as Governor-in-Chief of British North America. His mission was to solve the problems of the newly landed Loyalists from the United States after the US War of Independence. At first, Dorchester suggested opening the new Canada West as districts under the Quebec government, but the British Government made known its intention to split the Province of Quebec into Upper and Lower Canada. Dorchester began organizing for the new province of Upper Canada, including a capital. Dorchester's first choice was Kingston, but was aware of the number of Loyalists in the Bay of Quinte and Niagara areas, and chose instead the location north of the Bay of Toronto, midway between the settlements and 30 miles (48 km) from the US.

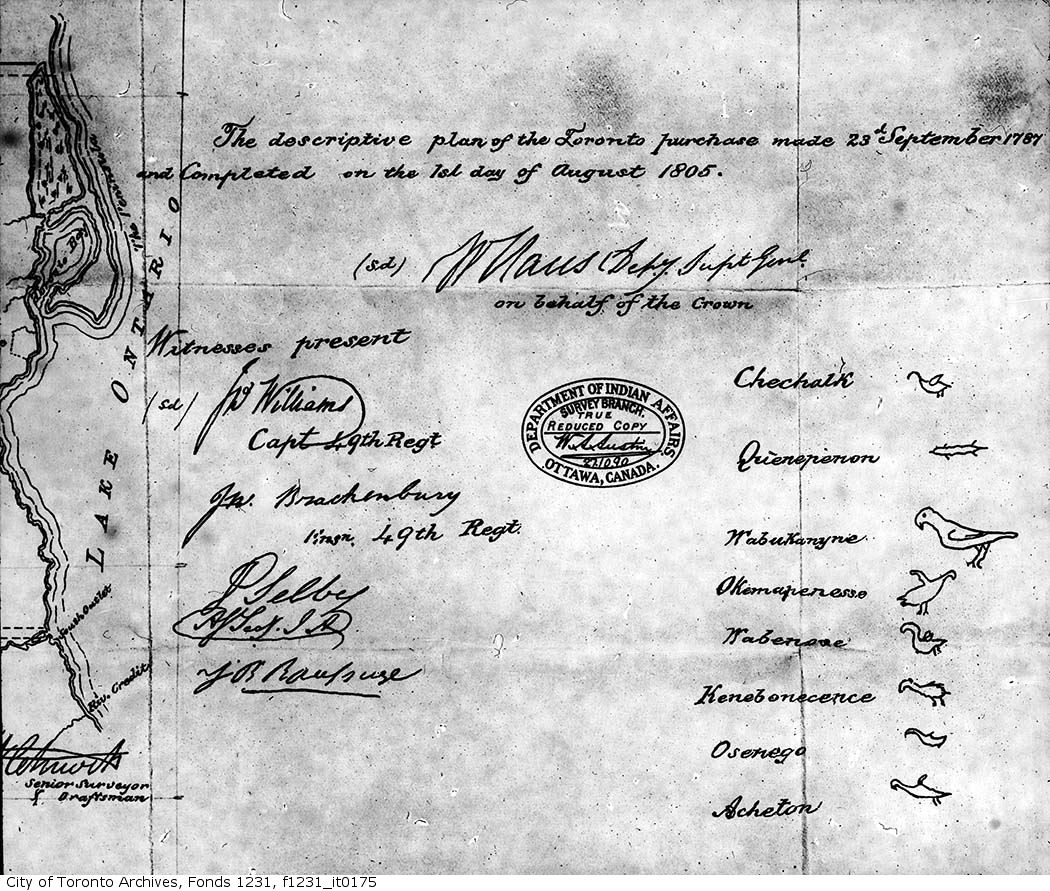
Signatures of the parties that ratified the 1805 indenture to the Toronto Purchase, an agreement initially made in 1787.

Under the Imperial policy of the time, namely the Royal Proclamation of 1763, which was rooted in Roman Law, Dorchester arranged to purchase more than 1,000 square kilometres (250,000 acres) of land from the Mississaugas in 1787. After surveying the land, the Mississaugas objected to the purchase and it was declared invalid. A revision to the Toronto Purchase was made in 1805, but this agreement too fell into dispute and was only eventually settled two centuries later in 2010 for CA$145 million. A townsite was surveyed in 1788 by Captain Gother Mann, and laid out in a gridiron, with government and military buildings around a central square. The purchase did not include the Rouge River valley, yet to be settled.

The influx of loyalist settlers to the western portions of the Province of Quebec, including the Toronto area, led to the passage of the Constitutional Act 1791. The Act split the colony into two. The eastern portion of Quebec became the Province of Lower Canada, and the western portion of Quebec (including Toronto) became the Province of Upper Canada. A provisional Upper Canada government was set up in Newark (today's Niagara-on-the-Lake) in 1791.

== Town of York (1793–1834) ==
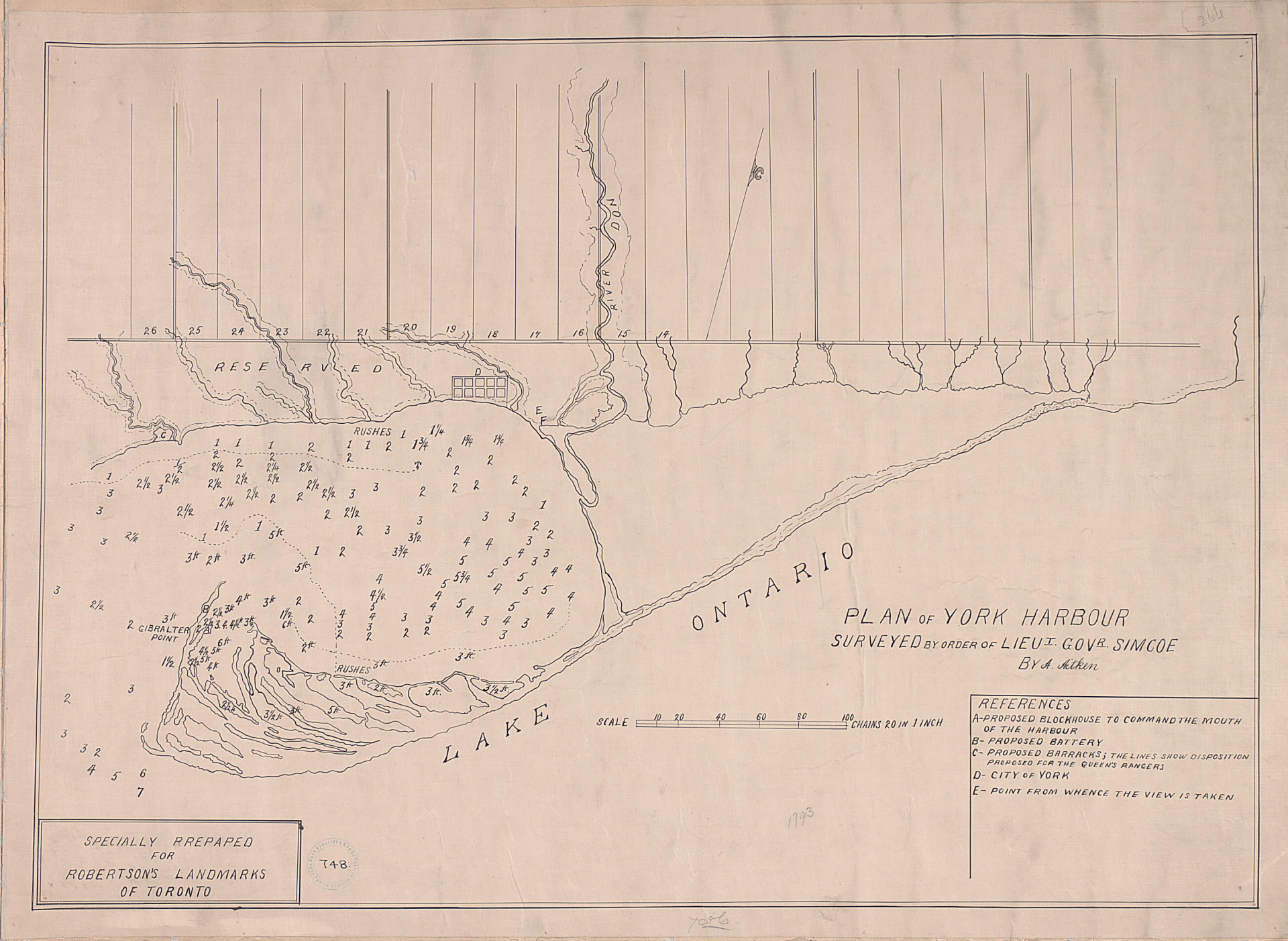
John Graves Simcoe's plans for York harbour, 1793.

In May 1793, Lieutenant-Colonel John Graves Simcoe, the first lieutenant-governor of the newly organized province of Upper Canada, visited Toronto for the first time. Simcoe was unhappy with the then-capital of Upper Canada Newark, and proposed moving it to the site of present-day London, Ontario but was dissuaded by the difficulty of building a road to the location. Rejecting Kingston, the choice of British Governor Lord Dorchester, the Toronto purchase site was then chosen by Simcoe on July 29, 1793, as the temporary capital of Upper Canada. Simcoe and his wife set up in a large tent at the water's edge near the foot of today's Bathurst Street. Toronto would remain "temporary" in status until 1796.

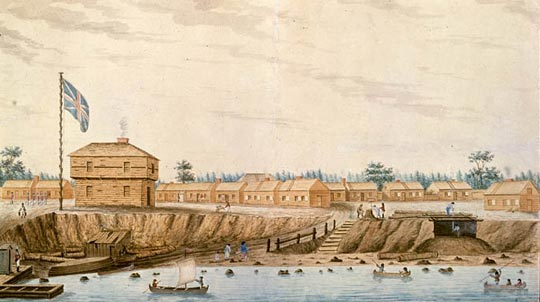
Constructed in 1793, Fort York was located at the entrance of a bay formed by the Toronto Islands.

The town, which Simcoe named "York", rejecting the aboriginal name, was built within a large protected bay formed by the Toronto Islands. At that time, the eventual Toronto Islands were a long sandy peninsula, which formed a large natural harbour. The harbour included a great wetland marsh, fed by the Don River, at the eastern end, which has since been filled in. In 1793 the only opening to the lake was at the western end; only later, in 1858, the "Eastern Gap", was punched through the peninsula by a storm, creating the current Toronto Islands. The large natural harbour of 1793 was defended with the construction of a garrison, later to be known as Fort York, guarding the entrance on what was then a high point on the water's edge, with a small river on the inland side (Garrison Creek). Rejecting Mann's town plan, Simcoe had another town plan set up. This was a more compact plan, a gridiron settlement of ten square blocks, closer to the eastern end of the harbour, entirely behind the peninsula, near what is now Parliament Street. The ten blocks are known today as the "Old Town" neighbourhood.

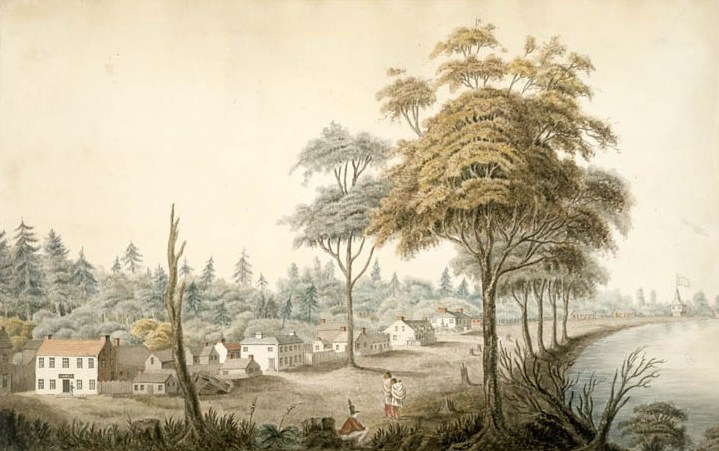
King Street in 1804. Later renamed Front Street, the road was one of York's original streets.

During Simcoe's time in Toronto, two main roads were laid out in the city: Dundas Street, named after Henry Dundas and Yonge Street, named after Sir George Yonge, the British Secretary of State for War. The Queen's Rangers and conscripted German settlers hacked out the wagon path of Yonge Street as far north as the Holland River. Government buildings were erected near Parliament and Front Street. Simcoe had hoped to found a university in York during his time but was successful in establishing law courts in York. Labour was in short supply, and slaves were still allowed at this time, but Simcoe arranged for the gradual abolition of slavery, passing legislation banning any further slaves, and the children of slaves would be freed when they reached their 25th birthday. Due to ill health, Simcoe returned to England in July 1796 on leave but did not return and he gave up his position in 1799. By this time, York was estimated to have a population of 240 persons.

Peter Russell was named administrator by Simcoe. Between 1799 and 1800, a road was constructed east of Toronto to the mouth of the Trent River by Asa Danforth. This was the making of today's Kingston Road. Russell established the first jail. He expanded the town westward and northward and during his term, the first St. Lawrence Market was built in 1803. The first church of what was to become today's St. James Cathedral was built in 1807. When Russell died in 1808, the town's population was now up to 500.

=== War of 1812 ===
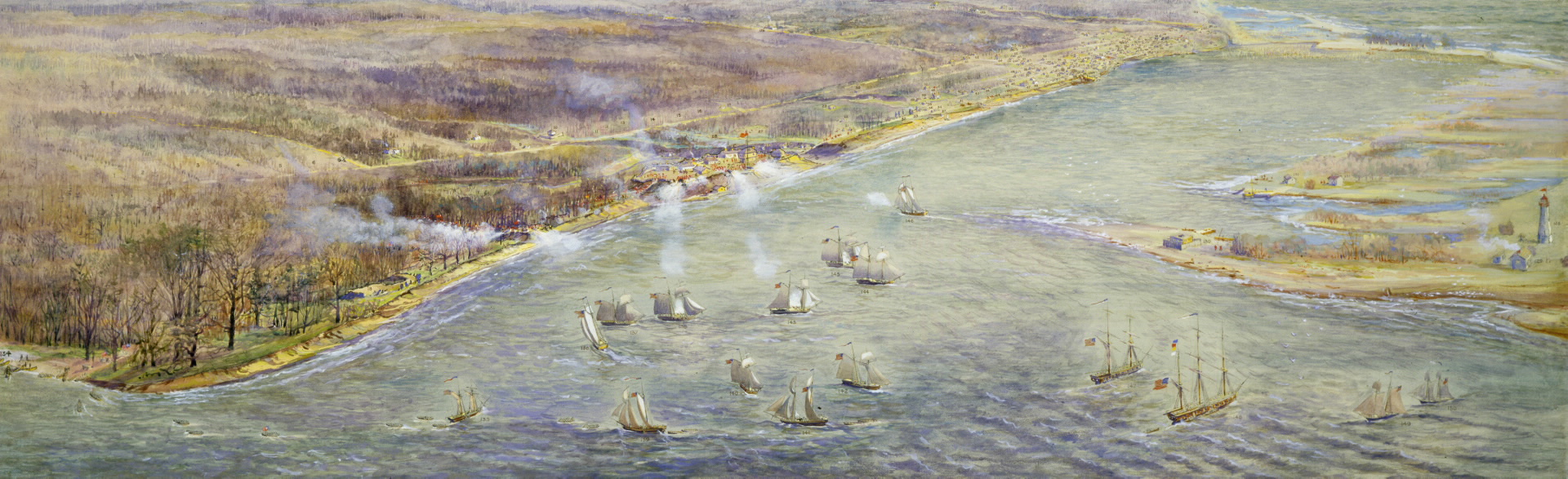
The American naval squadron exchange fire with Fort York during the Battle of York in April 1813. The American landing is depicted to the west (left foreground).

On 27 April 1813, American forces led by Zebulon Pike attacked York. After the British-Native force failed to prevent the American landings (in present-day Parkdale), British forces ordered a withdrawal, realizing that defence was impossible. Upon their departure, British forces rigged Fort York's gunpowder magazine to explode. The blast, powerful enough to perforate eardrums and hemorrhage the lungs of some American soldiers massed outside the Fort was said to have rattled windows 50 kilometres across the lake in Niagara. It exploded as the American forces were about to enter the fort, killing Pike and a contingent of his men. In the following days, American forces sacked the town and burned a number of properties including the Parliament Buildings. The town remained occupied until May 8, when American forces departed the settlement.

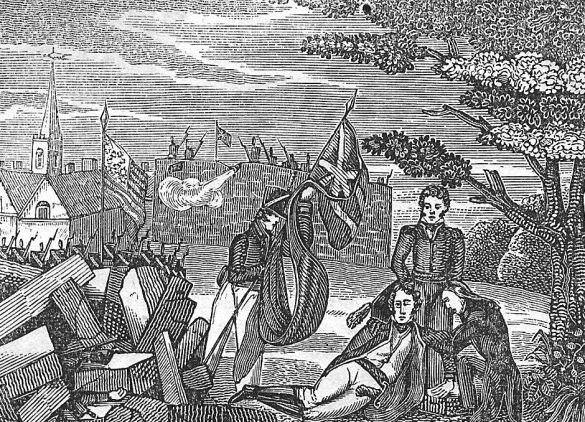
U.S. Army Brig. Gen. Zebulon Pike mortally wounded near the end of the Battle of York, struck by debris from an explosion set off at Fort York.

In addition to the Battle of York, two other American incursions occurred in the town during the war. The second incursion occurred several months later, on 31 July. An American squadron originally planned to attack British forces at Burlington Heights, although opted to raid York after finding the British at the Heights too well-entrenched. The landings at York were unopposed, with most York's garrison moving west to defend Burlington Heights. American forces raided the town's food and military stores, as well as destroyed several military structures before departing the same night.

The third incursion at York occurred a year later, in August 1814. On 6 August 1814, an American naval squadron arrived outside of York's harbour, dispatching USS Lady of the Lake to enter the town's harbour in an effort to gauge its defences. After the ship briefly exchanged fire with the improved Fort York, built several hundred metres to the west from its original position, the USS Lady of the Lake withdrew and returned to the American squadron outside the harbour. American forces did not attempt a landing during this incursion, although remained outside the town's harbour for the following three days before departing.

=== Post-War of 1812 ===
The original King's College building at the present site of Queen's Park.

After the Napoleonic Wars, York experienced an influx of poor immigrants from the United Kingdom, which was in a depression. The area to the northeast of St. James' became a slum. York had a red-light district on Lombard Street, and numerous taverns sprang up around St. Lawrence Market.

In 1827, King's College was established by royal charter as the first institution of higher education in Upper Canada. Advocated by John Strachan of the Family Compact, it was originally under the control of the Church of England. King's College became the University of Toronto upon its secularization by the provincial government in 1850.

== City of Toronto (1834–1997) ==
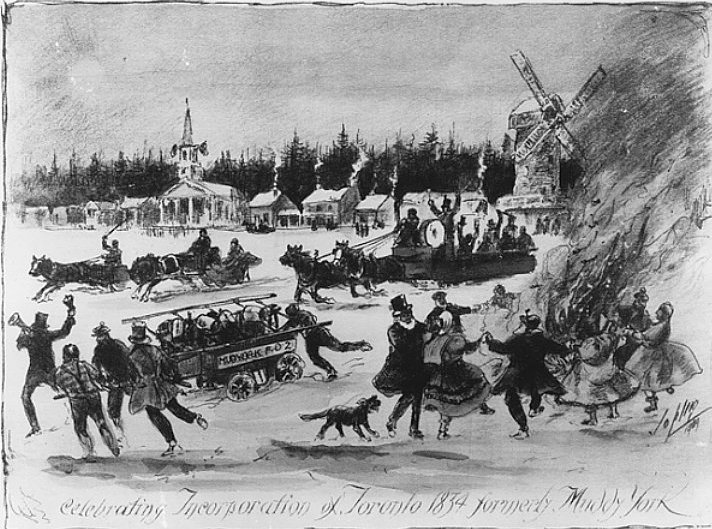
People celebrating the incorporation of Toronto. In 1834, the Town of York was incorporated as the new City of Toronto.

The town was incorporated as a city on March 6, 1834, reverting to the name of "Toronto" to distinguish it from New York City, as well as about a dozen other localities named "York" in the province (including York County in which Toronto was situated), and to disassociate itself from the negative connotation of dirty Little York, a common nickname for the town by its residents. William Lyon Mackenzie was its first mayor.

The new Reform-dominated municipal council quickly set to work to correct the problems left unchecked by the old Court of Quarter Sessions. Unsurprisingly for "Muddy York", the new civic corporation made roads a priority. This ambitious road improvement scheme put the new council in a difficult position; good roads were expensive, yet the incorporation bill had limited the ability of the council to raise taxes. An inequitable taxation system placed an unfair burden on the poorer members of the community.

Mackenzie decided to take the matter directly to the citizens and called a public meeting at the Market Square on July 29, 1834 "for six, that being the hour at which the Mechanicks and labouring classes can most conveniently attend without breaking on a day's labour." Mackenzie met with organized resistance, as the newly resurrected "British Constitutional Society", with William H. Draper as president, Tory aldermen Carfrae, Monro and Denison as vice-presidents, and common councilman and newspaper publisher George Gurnett as secretary, met the night before, and "from 150 to 200 of the most respectable portion of the community assembled and unanimously resolved to meet the Mayor upon his own invitation." Sheriff William Jarvis took over the meeting and interrupted Mayor Mackenzie "to propose to the Meeting a vote of censure on his conduct as Mayor." In the resulting pandemonium, the two sides agreed that they would hold a second meeting the next day.

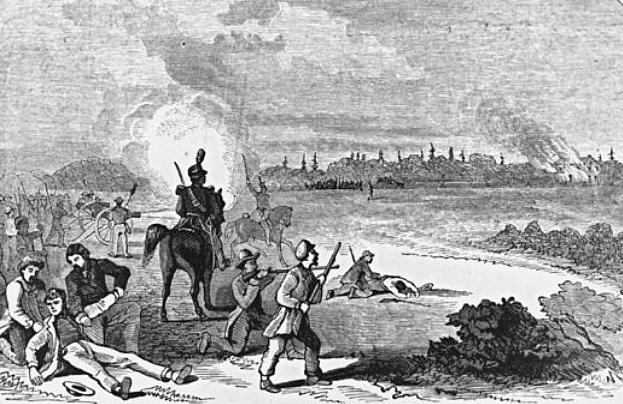
In 1837, a revolutionary insurrection was crushed by British authorities and Canadian volunteer units at Montgomery's Tavern on Yonge Street.

The Tories called the meeting for three in the afternoon so that the working class "mechanics" would be unable to attend. The inability of the mechanics to attend was their saving grace, for the meeting ended in a terrible tragedy when the packed gallery overlooking Market Square collapsed, pitching the onlookers into the butcher's stalls below, killing four and injuring dozens. The Tory press immediately placed the blame on Mackenzie, even though he did not attend. The Toronto mechanics, ironically spared the carnage because of the hour at which the meeting was appointed, did not appear to be swayed by the Tory press. In the October 1834 provincial elections, Mackenzie was overwhelmingly elected in the second riding of York; Sheriff William Jarvis, running in the city of Toronto, lost to reformer James Edward Small by the slim margin of 252 to 260 votes. Toronto was the site of the key events of the Upper Canada Rebellion in 1837, led by Mackenzie.

In 1841, the first gas street lamps appeared in Toronto. Over 100 were installed that year, in time for author Charles Dickens' visit in May 1842. Dickens described Toronto as "full of life, motion, business and improvement. The streets are well-paved and lighted with gas." Dickens was on a North American tour.

During the Typhus epidemic of 1847, 863 Irish immigrants died of typhus at fever sheds built at the Toronto Hospital at the northwest corner of King Street and John Street. The epidemic also killed the first Roman Catholic Bishop of Toronto, Michael Power, while providing care and ministering to Irish immigrants fleeing the Great Famine.

View of Toronto looking west from King and Jarvis in 1845. The buildings right of the trees were later destroyed in the Great Fire of 1849.

The April 7, 1849 Cathedral Fire destroyed the "Market Block" north of Market Square and St. Lawrence Market, as well as the first St. James' Cathedral and a portion of Toronto's first City Hall. While Toronto had a firefighting brigade and two fire halls, the force could not stop the large fire and many businesses were lost. A period of rebuilding followed.

After the Upper Canada Rebellion, resentments between the ruling factions of the Family Compact and the Reform elements in Toronto continued. As Irish and other Catholics migrated to Toronto and became a larger part of the population, the Orange Order representing Protestant elements loyal to the British Crown fought to keep control of the ruling government and civil services. The police constabulary and the fire departments were controlled through patronage and were under Orange control. Orange elements were known to use violence against Catholics and Reformers and were immune to prosecution. It would not be until the 20th century that Toronto would have its first Catholic mayor.

=== Later 19th century ===
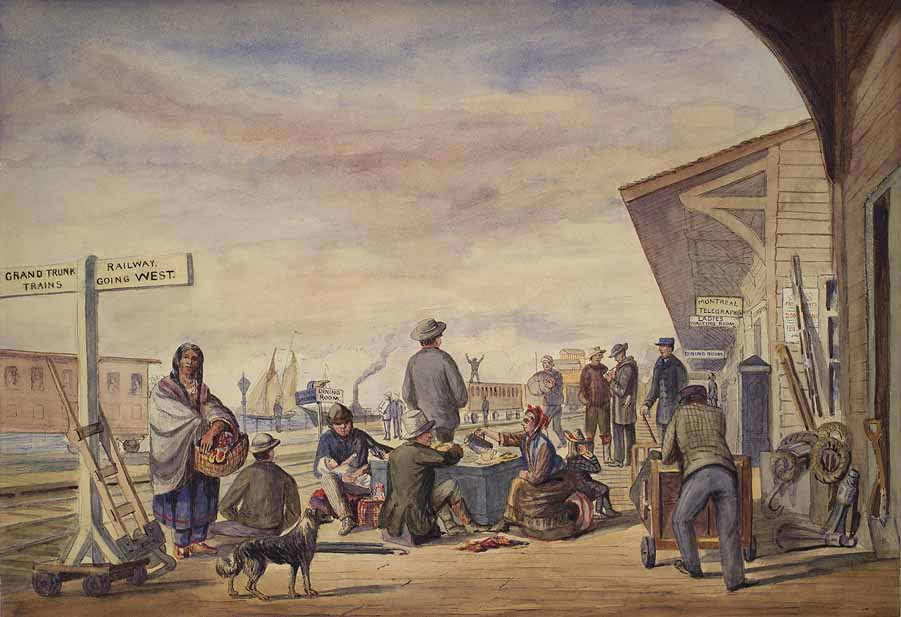
The construction of Union Station in 1858 dramatically increased commerce as well as the number of immigrants.

Toronto's population grew rapidly in the late 19th century, increasing from 30,000 in 1851 to 56,000 in 1871, 86,400 in 1881 and 181,000 in 1891. The total urbanized population was not counted as it is today to include the greater area; those just outside the city limits made for a significantly higher population. The 1891 figure also included population counted after recent annexations of many smaller, adjacent towns such as Parkdale, Brockton Village, West Toronto, East Toronto, and others. Immigration, high birth rates and influx from the surrounding rural population accounted for much of this growth, although immigration had slowed substantially by the 1880s if compared to the generation prior.

Rail lines came to the waterfront harbour area in the 1850s. A planned "Esplanade" land-fill project to create a promenade along the harbour, instead became a new right-of-way for the rail lines, which extended to new wharves on the harbour. Three railway companies built lines to Toronto: the Grand Trunk Railway, (GTR) the Great Western Railway and Northern Railway of Canada. The GTR built the first Union Station in 1858 in the downtown area. The advent of the railway dramatically increased the numbers of immigrants arriving and commerce, as had the Lake Ontario steamers and schooners entering the port. The railway lands would dominate the central waterfront for the next 100 years. In 1873, GTR built a second Union Station at the same location.

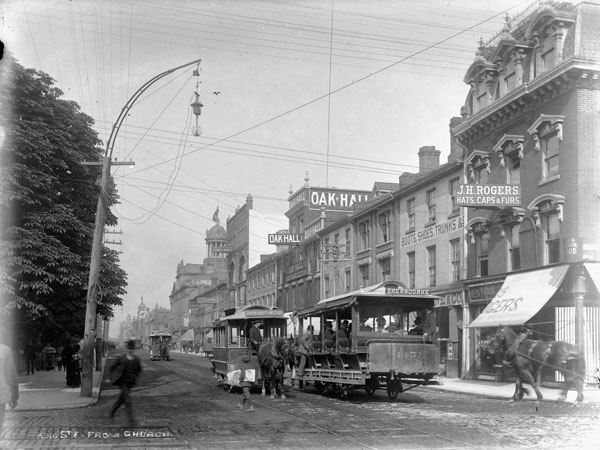
Horse-drawn streetcars in downtown Toronto in 1890.

New rail transportation networks were built in Toronto, including an extensive streetcar network in the city (still operational), plus long-distance railways and radial lines. One radial line ran mostly along Yonge Street for about 80 km to Lake Simcoe, and allowed day trips to its beaches. At the time, Toronto's own beaches were far too polluted to use, largely a side effect of dumping garbage directly in the lake. Other radial lines connected to suburbs.

As the city grew, it became bounded by the Humber River to the west and the Don River to the east. Several smaller rivers and creeks in the downtown area were routed into culverts and sewers and the land filled in above them, including both Garrison Creek and Taddle Creek, the latter running through the University of Toronto's campus. Much of Castle Frank Brook became covered during this time. At the time, they were being used as open sewers and were becoming a serious health problem. The re-configuration of the Don River mouth to make a ship channel and lakeshore reclamation project occurred in the 1880s, again largely driven by sanitary concerns and establishing effective port commerce.

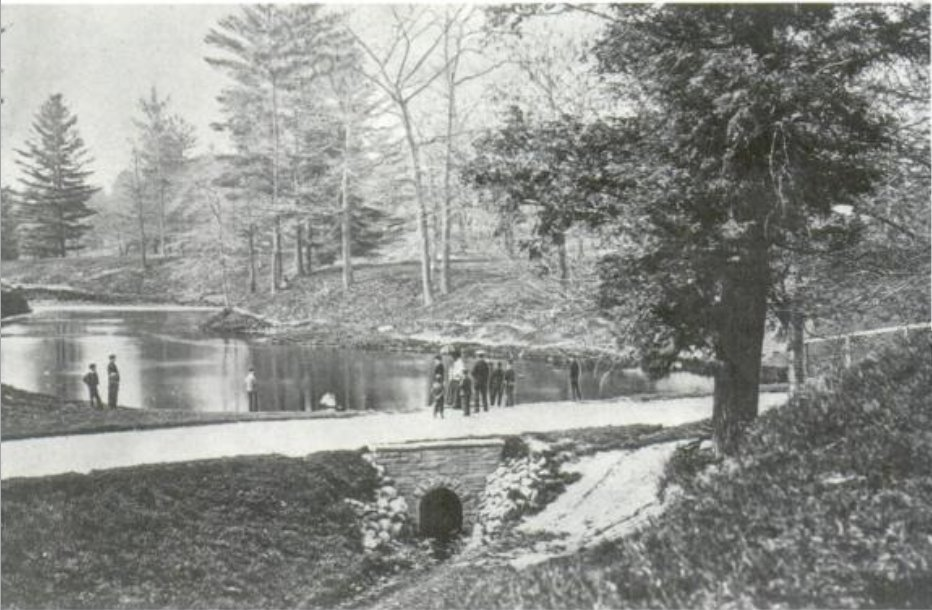
McCaul Pond at the University of Toronto campus, created from a dammed Taddle Creek, 1870.

Toronto had two medical schools, both independent: Trinity Medical School and the Toronto School of Medicine (TSM). During the 1880s, the TSM added instructors, expanded its curriculum, and focused on clinical instruction. Enrollments grew at both schools. Critics found proprietary schools lacking especially for their failure to offer sufficient instruction in the basic sciences. In 1887, the TSM became the medical faculty of the University of Toronto, increasing its emphasis on research within the medical curriculum. Trinity realized that its survival depended as well on close ties to basic science, and in 1904 it also merged into the University of Toronto Faculty of Medicine.

Toronto modernized and professionalized its public services in the late 19th and early 20th centuries. No service was changed more dramatically than the Toronto Police. The introduction of emergency telephone call boxes linked to a central dispatcher, plus bicycles, motorcycles and automobiles shifted the patrolman's duties from passively walking the beat to fast reaction to reported incidents, as well as handling automobile traffic. After the Great Fire of 1849, Toronto improved its fire code. This was followed by an expansion of the fire services and the eventual formation of Toronto Fire Services in 1874.

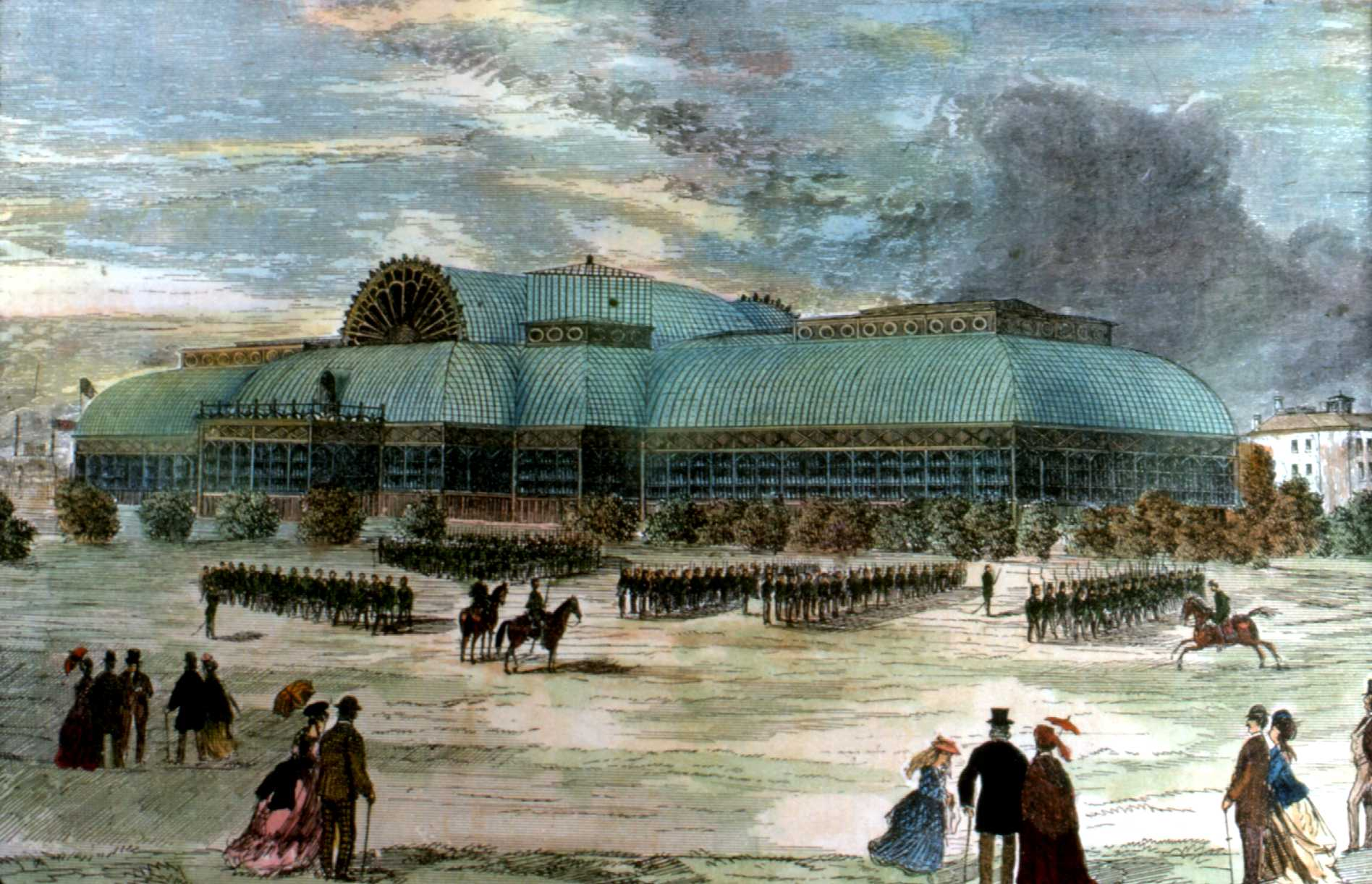
The Crystal Palace at the grounds of the Toronto Industrial Exhibition, 1871

In 1873, the Toronto Argonaut Football Club was founded. In 1879, the first Toronto Industrial Exhibition was held. A provincial Agricultural Fair was held in Ontario on a rotating basis since the 1850s, and after Toronto held the 1878 exhibition at King and Shaw streets, it wanted to hold the fair again. The request was turned down and the Industrial Exhibition was organized. The City arranged a lease of the garrison commons and moved its Crystal Palace building to the site. Eventually, the garrison commons became taken over by the Exhibition and the annual exhibition continues today as the Canadian National Exhibition. The grounds became Exhibition Place and hold sports venues, exhibition venues, trade and convention space used year-round.

==== Immigration ====
The Great Irish Famine (1845–1849) brought a large number of Irish into the city, a slight majority of whom were Protestant. The huge unexpected influx of very poor immigrants brought a new challenge to the Catholic Church. Its fear was that Protestants might use their material needs as a wedge for evangelization. In response, the Church built a network of charitable institutions such as hospitals, schools, boarding homes, and orphanages, to meet the need and keep people inside the faith. The Catholic Church was less successful in dealing with tensions between the French and the Irish Catholic clergy; eventually the Irish took control and won the support of Rome by its unwavering ultramontane (pro-Vatican) position. By 1851, the Irish-born population became the largest single ethnic group in the city.

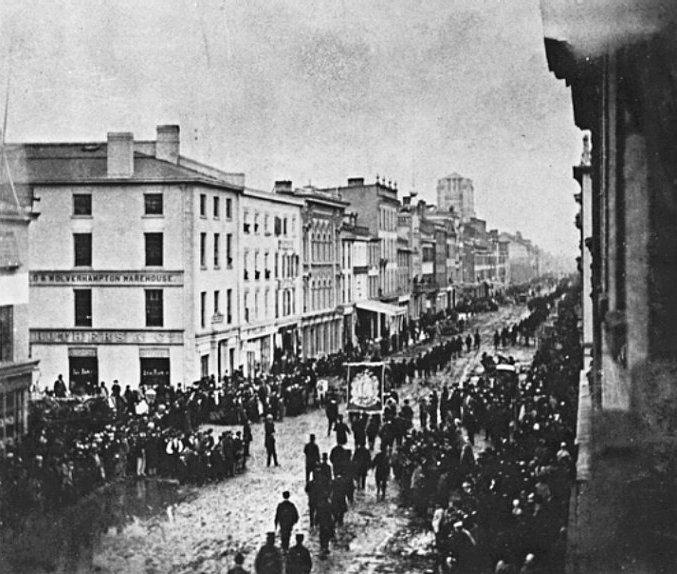
An Orange Order parade on King Street, c. 1870. The fraternal organization, originally made up of Irish Protestant immigrants, became a dominant force in Toronto during the late 19th century.

The Orange Order, based among the Protestant Irish, became a dominant force in Toronto society, so much so that 1920s Toronto was called the "Belfast of Canada". The Orange opposed everything Catholic. They lost interest in Ireland after the establishment of Northern Ireland and the Orange influence faded after 1940. Irish Catholics arriving in Toronto faced widespread intolerance and severe discrimination, both social and legislative, leading to several large scale riots between Catholics and Protestants from 1858 to 1878, culminating in the Jubilee riots of 1875. The Irish population essentially defined the Catholic population in Toronto until 1890, when German and French Catholics were welcomed to the city by the Irish, but the Irish proportion still remained 90% of the Catholic population. However, various positive initiatives such as the foundation of St. Michael's College in 1852, three hospitals, and the most significant charitable organizations in the city (the Society of Saint Vincent de Paul) and House of Providence created by Irish Catholic groups strengthened the Irish identity, transforming the Irish presence in the city into one of influence and power.

McGowan argues that between 1890 and 1920, the city's Catholics experienced major social, ideological, and economic changes that allowed them to integrate into Toronto society and shake off their second-class status. The Irish Catholics (in contrast to the French) strongly supported Canada's role in the First World War. They broke out of the ghetto and lived in all of Toronto's neighbourhoods. Starting as unskilled labourers, they used high levels of education to move up and were well represented among the lower middle class. Most dramatically, they intermarried with Protestants at an unprecedented rate.

During the late 19th century and throughout the 20th century, the Irish immigrants who had followed the British to Toronto were followed by many other immigrant groups in the late 19th century: Germans, Italians, and Jews from various parts of Eastern Europe; later Chinese, Russians, Finns, Poles, and many other eastern Europeans. By the latter half of the 20th century, refugees and immigrants from many other parts of the world were the major source of immigration. British immigration remained strong through the latter half of the 19th century well into the 20th century, in addition to a steady influx from rural areas of Ontario, which included French-Canadians.

=== 20th century ===
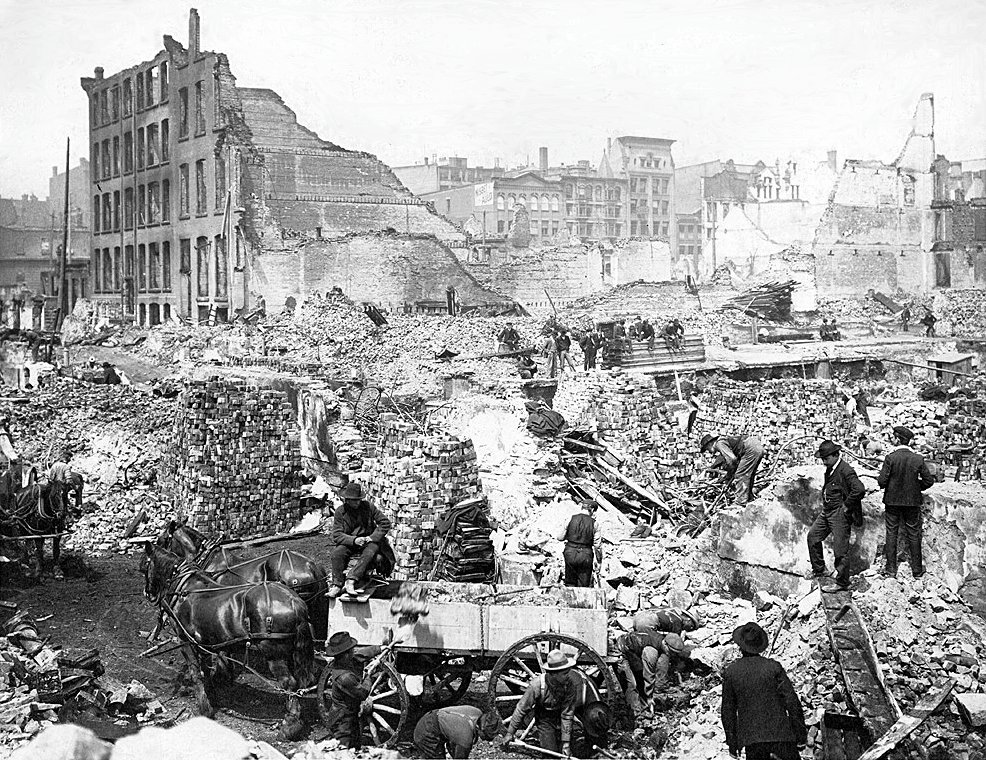
The Great Fire of Toronto of 1904 was a large fire that destroyed much of Downtown Toronto.

By 1900, the centre of business had moved west of the historical Town of York site. A new downtown to the west of Yonge and King Streets was built. The City of Toronto moved into a new City Hall, built at the head of Bay Street at Queen Street. Much of this new downtown was destroyed in the Great Toronto Fire of 1904, but it was quickly rebuilt, with new taller buildings. South of downtown, the railways dominated most of the lands. A new viaduct was built to carry the main lines and eliminate the many at-level crossings. A single Union Station was built to replace the several railway stations of the rail lines. It sat empty for a while over disagreements between government and the rail companies. In 1917, the Toronto Hockey Club (eventually the Toronto Maple Leafs) was founded.

The Don River has an especially deep ravine, cutting off the east of the city at most points north of the lakeshore. This was addressed in October 1918, when the construction of the Prince Edward Viaduct, was finalized, linking Bloor Street on the western side of the ravine with Danforth Avenue on the east. The designer, Edmund Burke, fought long and hard to have a lower deck added to the bridge for trains, a cost the city was not willing to provide for. Nevertheless, he finally got his way, and thereby saved the city millions of dollars when the Toronto Transit Commission (TTC) subway started using the deck in 1966.

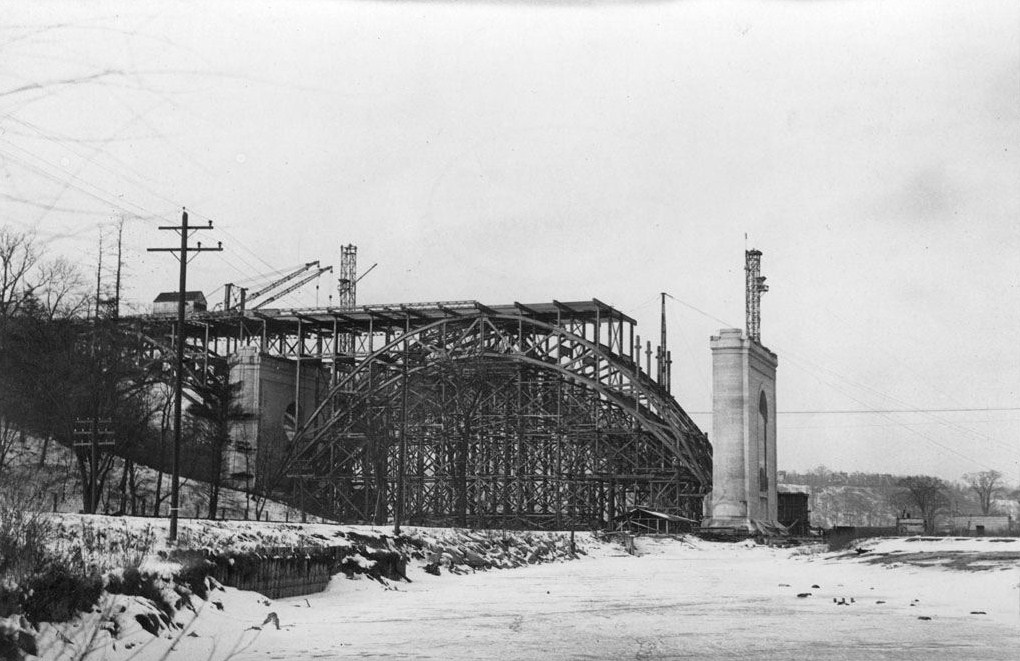
Construction for the Prince Edward Viaduct in 1916.

Entrepreneurship was exemplified by the career of John Northway (1848–1926). Beginning as a tailor in a small town, he moved to Toronto and soon developed a chain of department stores. His innovations in the sewing and marketing of ladies' wear enabled the emergence of a Canadian ladies' garment industry. Northway pioneered modern business methods and accounting methods. He innovated as well in labour relations, as a pioneer in sickness and accident compensation and profit-sharing schemes. A millionaire by 1910, he played a leading role in Toronto's civic life.

In 1923, two researchers at the University of Toronto, J.J.R. Macleod (1876–1935) and Frederick Banting (1891–1941), shared the Nobel prize in Medicine for their 1921 discovery of insulin, putting Toronto on the world map of advanced science.

From 1926 to 1936, Toronto lawyer, financier, and practical joker Charles Vance Millar created the Great Stork Derby, a contest in which women had to give birth to the most babies within a ten-year period after his death, in order to qualify for an unusual bequest in his will for a residue of his significant estate.

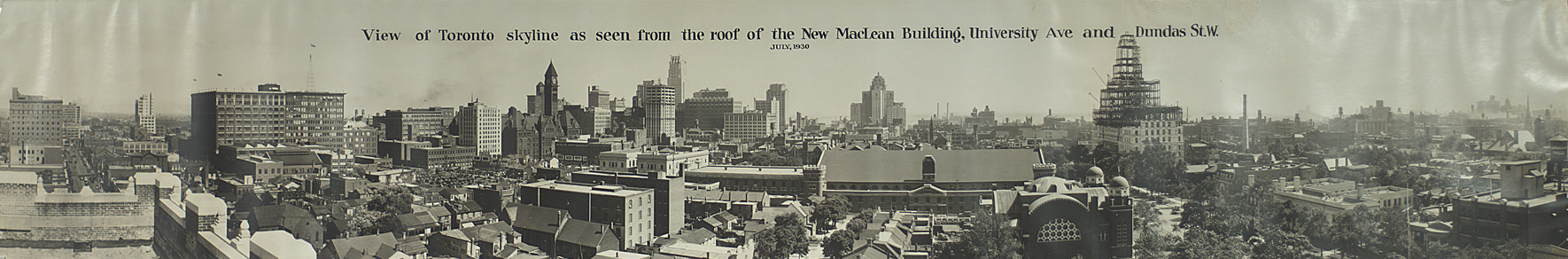
Toronto skyline in July 1930.

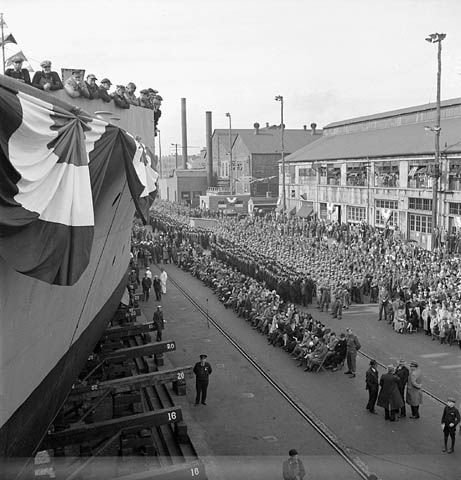
In 1944, the 1,000th Canadian-built vessel since the start of World War II was launched in Toronto. During the war, most of the city's industries were converted for war-time production.

During World War II, Toronto became a major centre for Canada's military. The Exhibition Place was taken over for military training and deployment. The Island Airport was taken over for training of the Royal Norwegian Air Force and the Royal Canadian Air Force. Civilian manufacturing companies, such as Inglis, were converted to war-time production of armaments. At Malton Airport and Downsview Airport, new aviation factories built many fighters and bombers to be used in Europe.

==== Post-World War II ====
After World War II, a continuous influx of newcomers from around the world and Canadians from Atlantic Canada contributed to the growth of Toronto. The large numbers of new Canadians helped Toronto's population swell to over one million by 1951, and double again to over two million, by 1971. The demographics of Toronto changed as a result also, as many immigrants were from countries other than the United Kingdom. The ethnic diversity grew and saw the development of enclaves such as Little Italy, Little Portugal and two new Chinatowns. In 1967, the first "Caribana" festival was held celebrating the culture of the West Indies.

The provincial government created the Municipality of Metropolitan Toronto, a metropolitan government that incorporated numerous local municipalities in 1954. The Metro Toronto government took over the construction and maintenance of region-wide infrastructure, building water treatment plants, roads, public transit and expressways, to facilitate the growth of the suburbs.

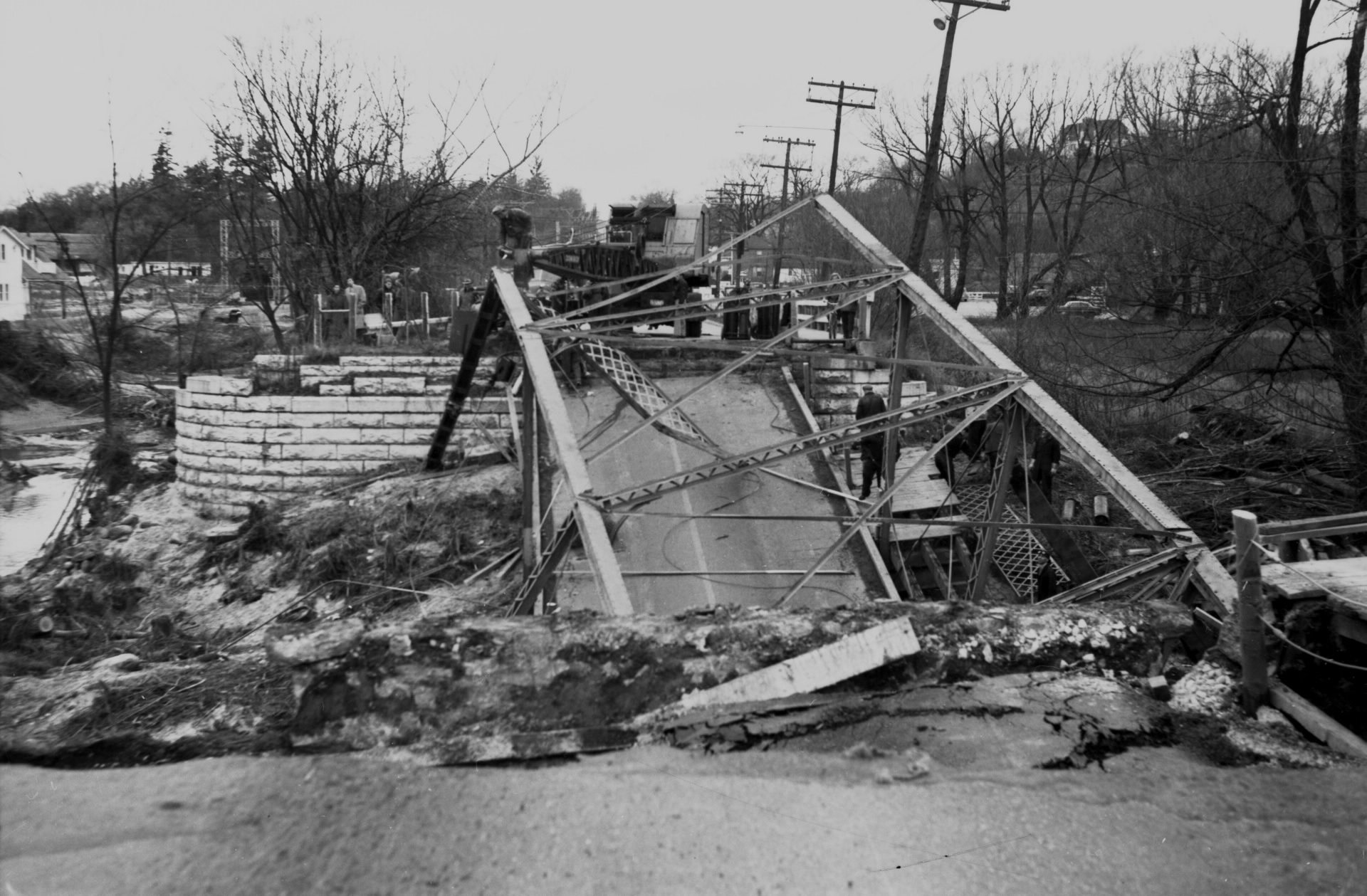
In 1954, Hurricane Hazel swept through Toronto, causing significant flooding and damage.

In 1954, Hurricane Hazel swept through Toronto, causing significant flooding; 81 people were killed. As a result, building on floodplains was banned, new flood control works such as dams and flood channels were built, and the lands of floodplains were cleared of buildings, conserved as park lands and conservation areas.

In 1954, the original stretch of the subway was completed from Union to Eglinton stations on the Yonge line (later numbered as Line 1). This was followed by the construction of the Bloor-Danforth and University Avenue subways, connecting the core to the suburbs to the east and west. The Metro Government built the Gardiner Expressway and the DVP expressways in the late 1950s and early 1960s, but plans to build a large network of expressways throughout the city died in 1971 with the cancellation of the Spadina Expressway. Metro proceeded to build the Spadina subway line north into North York and extended the Yonge line north into North York.

The new "urban renewal" movement made its influence felt in Toronto. Large areas, deemed "slums", were cleared. This included the areas of Regent Park, Lawrence Heights and Alexandria Park. The streets and small homes were replaced by mega-blocks with limited streets and apartment buildings. The experiment in social housing would improve the number of affordable units available, at the expense of a large increase in the budgets of Metro and Toronto to maintain the buildings. By the 2000s, Toronto would be in serious arrears on maintenance, and in the 2000s, Toronto has started to dismantle the large projects and replace them with designs more resembling regular neighbourhoods.

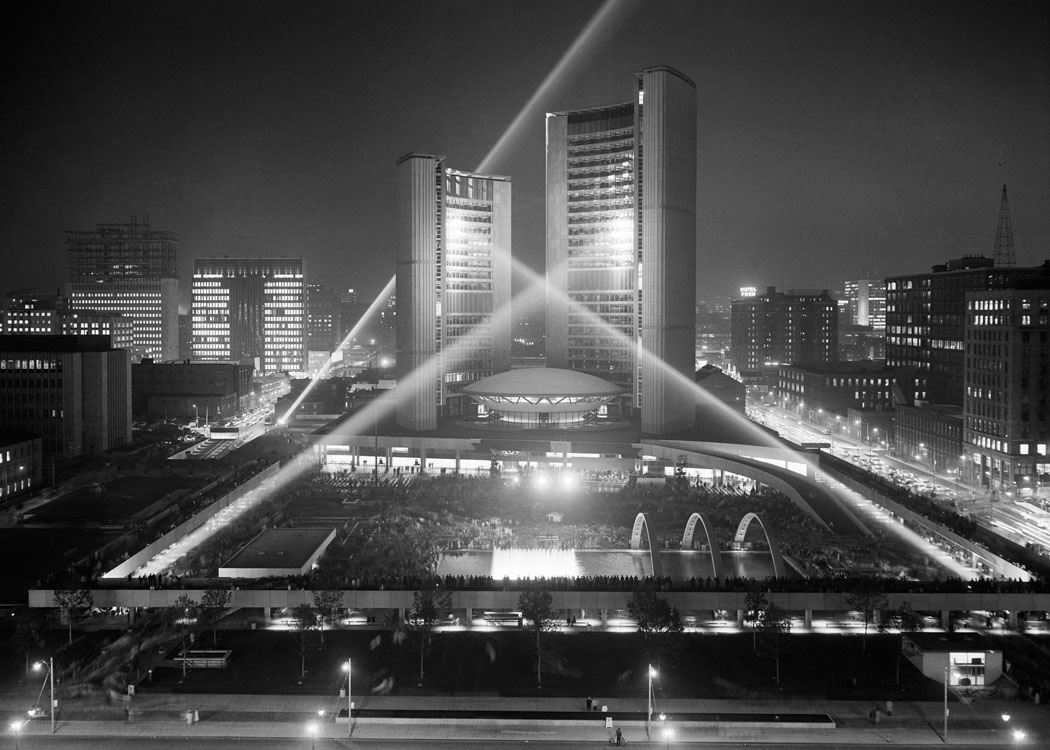
The opening for the fourth Toronto City Hall in 1965. The modernist design of the building have made it a landmark of the city.

During the 1960s and 1970s, Toronto's downtown core was rebuilt with new, taller, skyscrapers. A new Toronto City Hall was opened; the Eaton Centre shopping and office complex; four new bank towers were built at the intersection of Bay and King Streets, the "MINT corners" and new towers along University Avenue. This was causing havoc with the city's old television and radio towers which were simply not tall enough to serve the city, so engineers and politicians decided that something had to be built taller than any other building in the city or anything that would probably ever be built. They decided to build a super-tall, massive television and radio tower (the CN Tower), which was completed in 1976 on the railway lands south of downtown. Around the downtown core, which had been dominated by railway lands since the 1850s, new land uses were found for the railway lands. The St. Lawrence Neighbourhood project built a new community from old rail lands to the east of Yonge. Along the waterfront, new office and residential towers were built on former industrial lands. The new SkyDome stadium (later renamed Rogers Centre in 2005) was built in 1989 on rail lands downtown. South of King Street, west of University Avenue, more railway and warehouse lands were converted, seeing the opening of the Metro Toronto Convention Centre, a new CBC English-language headquarters; Roy Thomson Hall concert hall and the Princess of Wales Theatre.

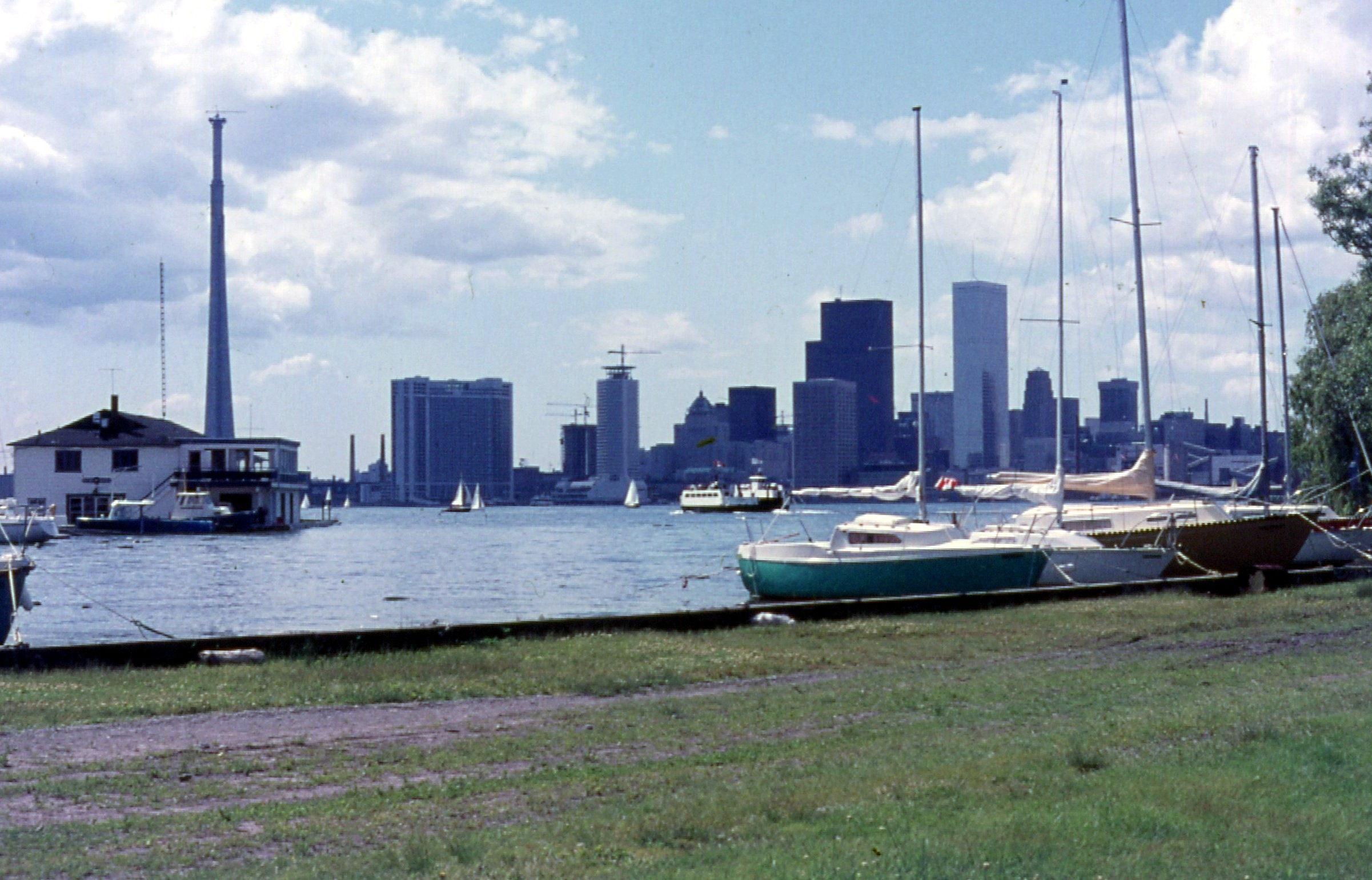
Skyline of downtown Toronto in 1973. Construction for the CN Tower is visible in the left background.

During the 1970s, the population of Toronto continued to grow and surpassed that of Montreal. In 1971 the populations of the respective Census Metropolitan Areas (CMAs) for Toronto and Montreal stood at 2.7 million and 2.6 million. By 1981 Toronto had surpassed Montreal with a population of 3 million versus 2.8 million for Montreal. Factors for the growth of Toronto over Montreal included strong immigration, increasingly by Asians and people of African descent, the increasing size of the auto industry in Southern Ontario, due to the signing of the Auto Pact with the US in 1965, a calmer political environment (Quebec experienced two referendums on separation during these years, one in 1980 and the other in 1995), and lower personal income taxes than in Quebec.

Toronto had been the junior partner in Canadian business to Montreal historically. This changed as Toronto grew rapidly after World War II. Another factor was the growing nationalist movement in Quebec, particularly with the 1976 success of the Parti Québécois, which systematically alienated Anglophone businesses. By 1995, Toronto controlled 48% of Canada's financial assets and 44% of the non-financial corporate assets, compared to 28% and 22% by Montreal.

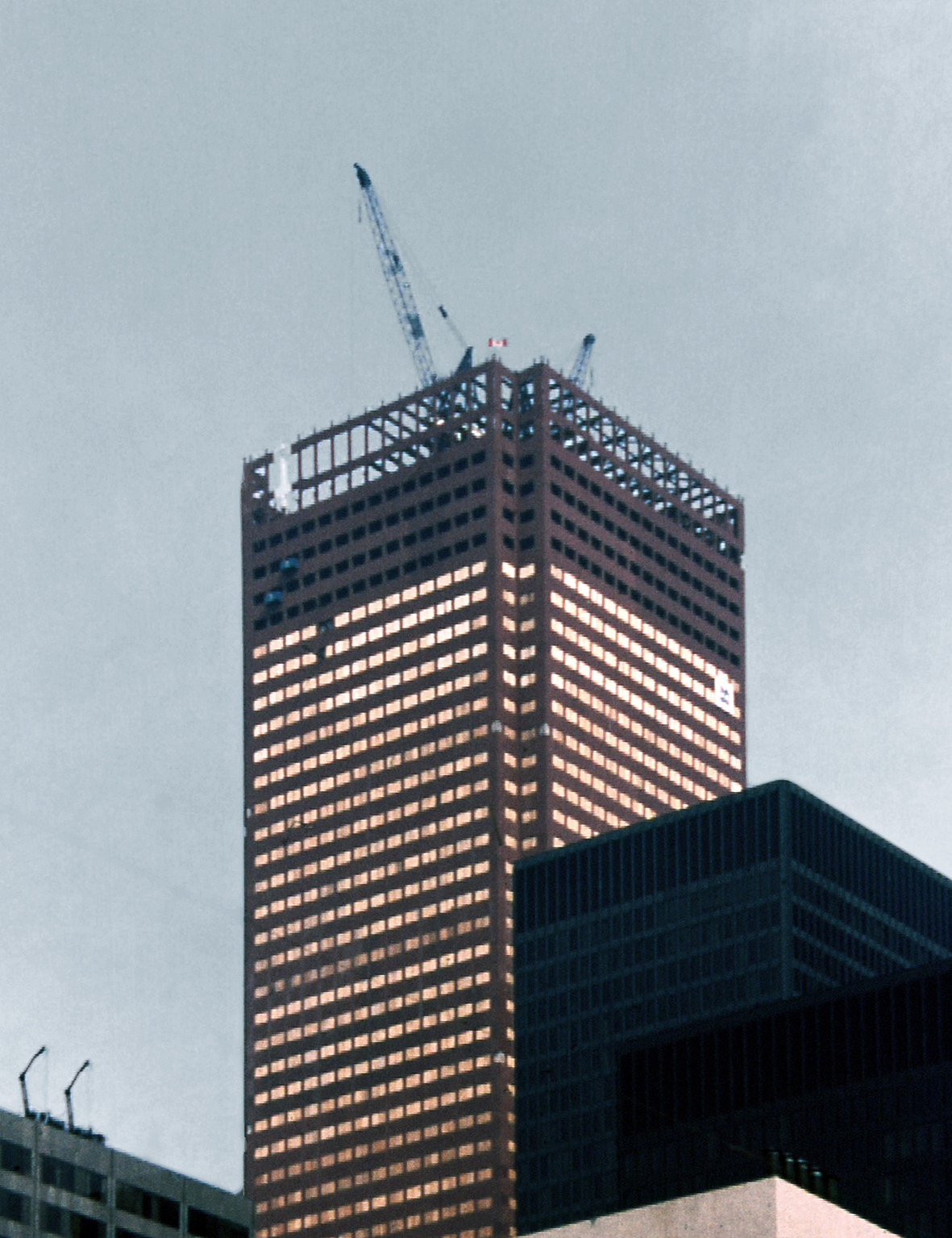
Construction of First Canadian Place, the operational headquarters of the Bank of Montreal, in 1975. The 1970s saw several Canadian financial institutions move to Toronto.

During this period, three of Canada's largest banks became headquartered in Toronto: the Royal Bank of Canada, the Toronto-Dominion Bank and the Canadian Imperial Bank of Commerce. These along with the Manulife Financial Corporation, Sun Life Financial Inc. and Toronto Stock Exchange form the financial district, the financial heart of Canada. Toronto also became the corporate capital of Canada with the majority of Canadian companies having their head offices there. Notable examples include: George Weston Limited, Onex Corporation, Magna International Inc., Wal-Mart Canada Corporation and Brookfield Asset Management Inc.

Toronto strengthened its position as the cultural centre of English-speaking Canada during these years. The Globe and Mail and the National Post, two of Canada's most important newspapers have their head offices there. The new CBC Canadian Broadcasting Centre was completed in 1993 and became the corporation's control facility for English language broadcasting in Canada.In 1993, Ryerson Polytechnical Institute gained full university status and became Ryerson Polytechnic University. On April 26, 2022, the university's Board of Governors voted to rename the institution Toronto Metropolitan University, with implementation of the new name beginning immediately afterward. The name change was formally enacted through provincial legislation in December 2022. Physical signage changes continued over the following months, including the removal of the former name's lettering from the university library tower in October 2022, with the broader campus-wide replacement of approximately 20,000 signs reported as largely complete by April 2023.

The changing high-rise downtown core provided visual evidence of growth. New skyscrapers included, the Royal Trust Tower, 1969, First Canadian Place, 1975, the CN Tower, 1975, Royal Bank Plaza, South Tower, 1977, the First Bank Tower, 1979, Scotia Plaza, 1988, the SkyDome, 1989, the BCE Place–Canada Trust Tower, 1990 and the Bay Wellington Tower, 1990.

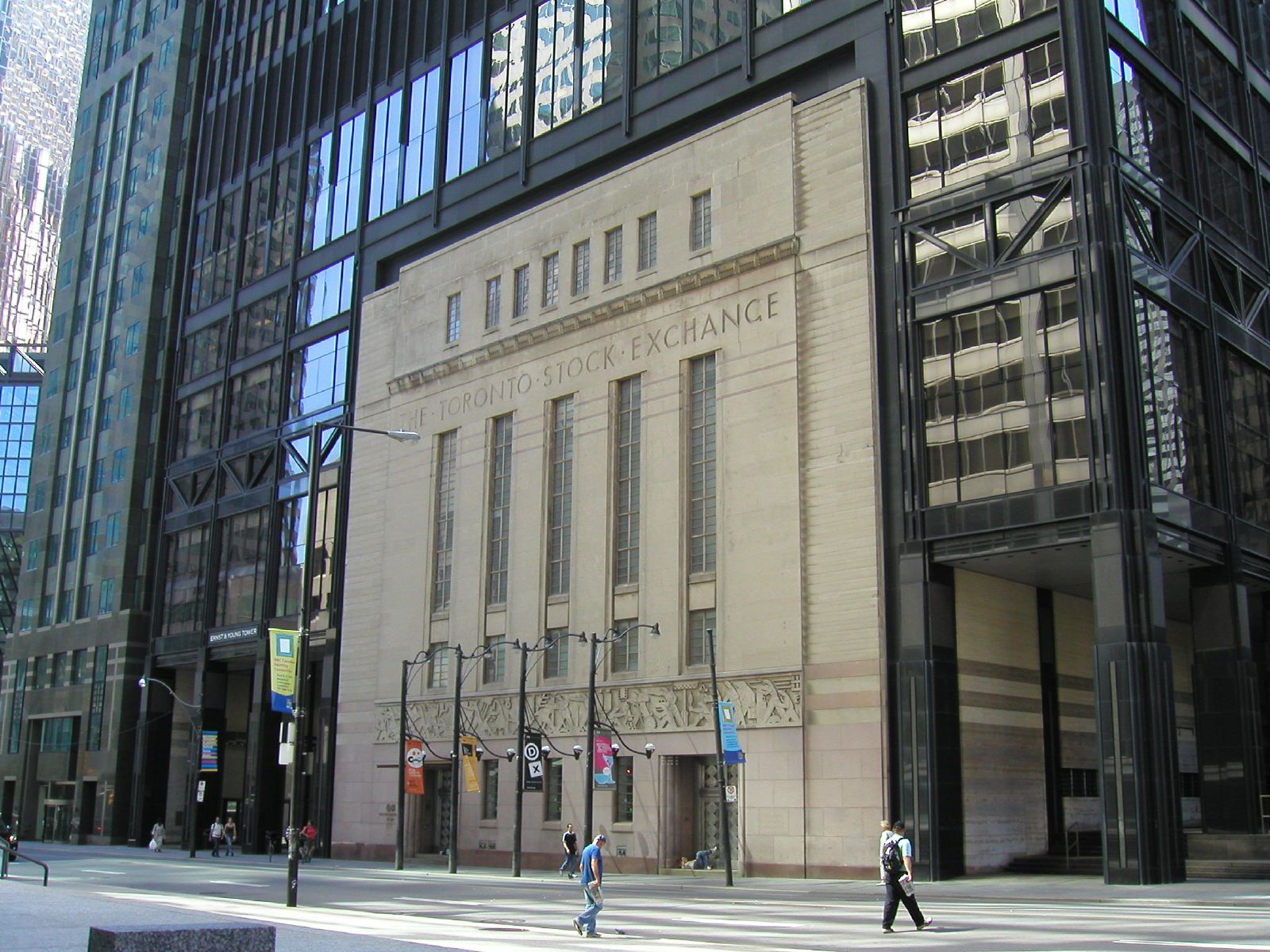
The former Toronto Stock Exchange building incorporated into the Toronto-Dominion Centre. The city began to designate heritage buildings in the 1970s, forcing some developers to incorporate them in their designs.

The loss of many of the old buildings in the downtown saw a new interest among Toronto's citizens to preserve heritage buildings and the City of Toronto began designating buildings to prevent their demolition. The Toronto City Council in the 1970s was dominated by reformers such as David Crombie and John Sewell; opposed to the pace and destructive aspects of Toronto's sudden growth. A by-law was put into place temporarily halting skyscraper construction while land use controls and the official plan was updated.

In the 1990s, Toronto was affected by the country-wide recession. As well, the senior-level governments of Canada and Ontario downloaded the delivery of services. The Ontario government transferred a section of the Queen Elizabeth Way to the Metro Gardiner Expressway, cancelled the Eglinton subway line and trimmed transit, housing and welfare subsidies. The Canadian government formed independent agencies to manage the Toronto International Airport and the Toronto Harbour; the latter particular controversial to Toronto as Toronto City Council wanted to take over the harbour as part of waterfront revitalization efforts. As well, the Canadian government eliminated its public housing programs. These changes would lead to budget crises for the Toronto government of the 2000s.

In sports, the Toronto Blue Jays of Major League Baseball won the 1992 and 1993 World Series.

== Amalgamated Toronto (1998–present) ==
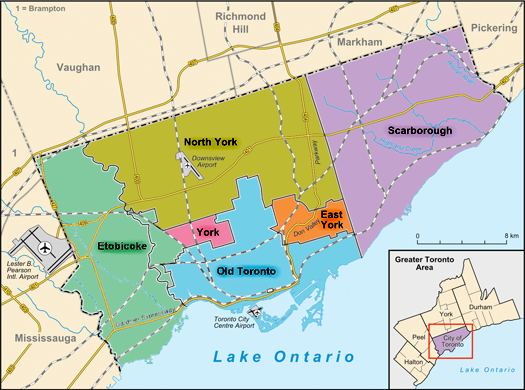
Municipalities of Metropolitan Toronto prior to its dissolution. In 1998, the six municipalities were dissolved and amalgamated, forming the new city of Toronto.

On January 1, 1998, Toronto was greatly enlarged, not through traditional annexations, but as an amalgamation of the Municipality of Metropolitan Toronto and its six lower-tier constituent municipalities; East York, Etobicoke, North York, Scarborough, York, and the original city itself. They were dissolved by an act of the Government of Ontario, and formed into a single-tier City of Toronto (colloquially dubbed the "megacity") replacing all six governments.

The merger was proposed as a cost-saving measure by the Progressive Conservative provincial government under Mike Harris. The announcement touched off vociferous public objections. In March 1997, a referendum in all six municipalities produced a vote of more than 3:1 against amalgamation. However, as the referendum had little to no legal effect, the Harris government could thus legally ignore the results of the referendum, and did so in April when it tabled the City of Toronto Act. Both opposition parties held a filibuster in the provincial legislature, proposing more than 12,000 amendments that allowed residents on streets of the proposed megacity take part in public hearings on the merger and adding historical designations to the streets. This only delayed the bill's inevitable passage, given the PCO's majority.

North York mayor Mel Lastman became the first "megacity" mayor, and the 62nd Mayor of Toronto, with his electoral victory. Lastman gained national attention after multiple snowstorms, including the January Blizzard of 1999, dumped 118 cm of snow and effectively immobilized the city. He called in the Canadian Army to aid snow removal by use of their equipment to augment police and emergency services. The move was ridiculed by some in other parts of the country, fueled in part by what was perceived as a frivolous use of resources.

=== 21st century ===
In 2001, Toronto finished second to Beijing in voting by the International Olympic Committee for the host city of the 2008 Summer Olympics. Toronto's bid to host the games failed after mayor Mel Lastman, while on a visit to Kenya in order to gain support from African Olympic delegates, shocked and insulted his hosts, when he said, "Why the hell would I want to go to a place like Mombasa? I just see myself in a pot of boiling water with all these natives dancing around me."

In 2002, Toronto hosted World Youth Day 2002 and a visit by Pope John Paul II. The municipal government's two largest unions, Locals 79 and 416 of the Canadian Union of Public Employees, went on strike several weeks before the scheduled event, meaning that certain basic services, such as day care and parks programs, were not available. Since city workers also pick up garbage and recycling, city parks became piled high with garbage – some parks were designated official dump sites for the duration of the strike, while others were used illegally. The situation was resolved when the Ontario government tabled back-to-work legislation to end the strike, and the city was back to normal before the start of World Youth Day.

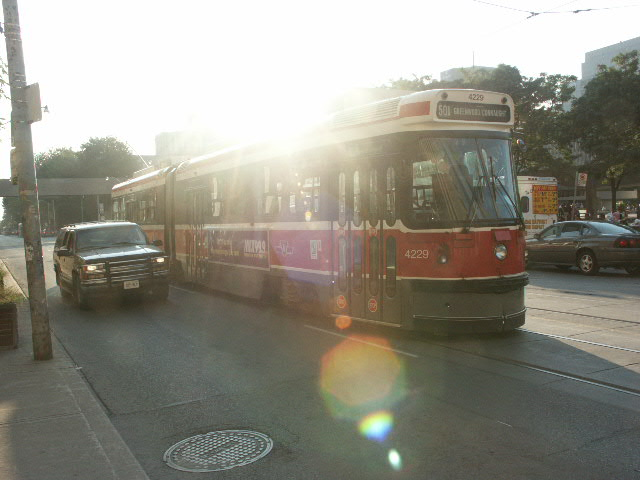
A TTC streetcar is left stranded after the city lost power in the Northeast blackout of 2003.

In early 2003, Toronto was affected by the SARS epidemic. Although the disease was primarily confined to hospitals and health-care workers, tourism in Toronto suffered significantly because of media reports. To help recover the losses the city suffered in industries and tourism, the city held the SARS Benefit Concert (colloquially termed SARSStock), which attracted 450,000 people in late July, making it one of the ten largest concerts in history. Two weeks later, the city was also affected by the 2003 North America blackout. In the resulting chaos, the city ground to a halt, with people taking to the streets to party and talk to their neighbours. Power was not restored for more than 12 hours; in some isolated pockets, not for up to three days.

In the November 2003 municipal election, David Miller was elected to replace Mel Lastman as mayor, after running a successful campaign which included a promise to cancel the proposed bridge to Toronto Island Airport.

According to 2004 United Nations report, Toronto has the second-highest proportion of immigrants in the world, after Miami, Florida. Almost half of Toronto's residents were born outside Canada. The resulting cultural diversity is reflected in the numerous ethnic neighbourhoods of the city. The proliferation of shops and restaurants derived from cultures around the world makes the city one of the most exciting places in the world to visit. Moreover, the relative tranquility that mediates between such diverse populations is a testament to the perceived tolerant character of Canadian society.

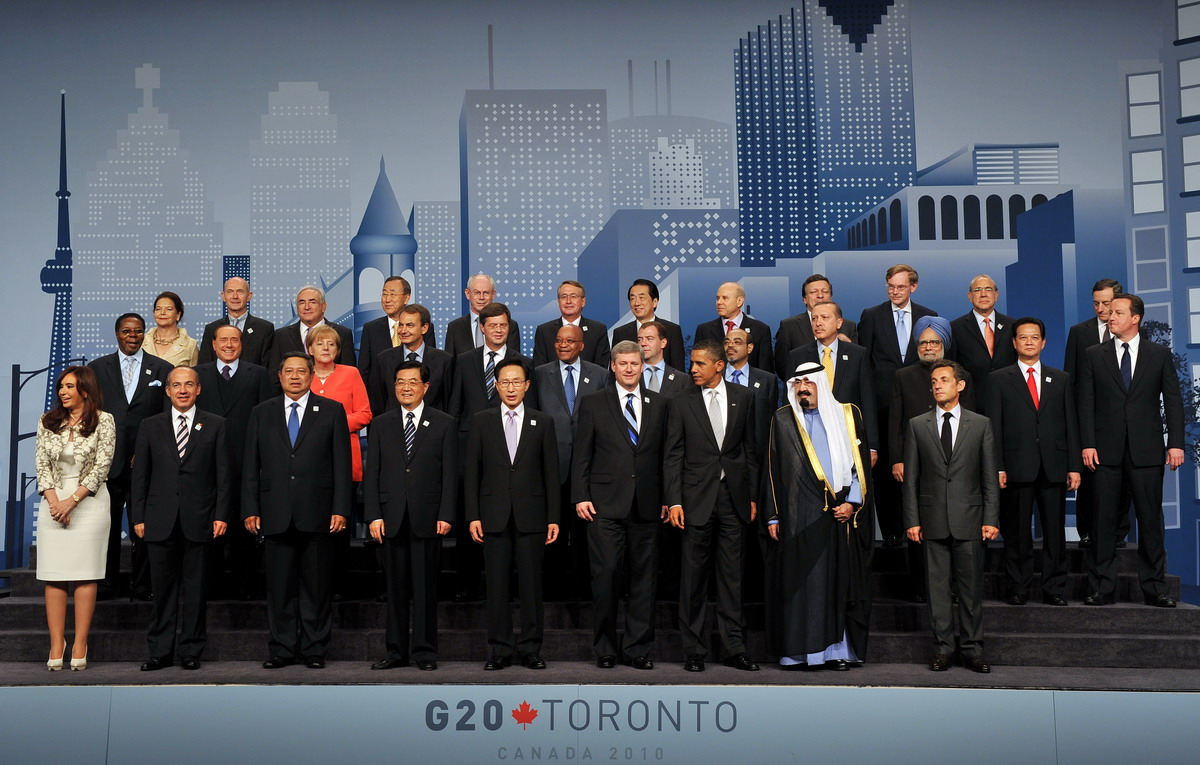
Official photo of world leaders at the 2010 G20 Toronto summit.

Toronto hosted the G20 summit on June 26–27, 2010, but it was not without protests. The protests were met with one of the most expensive temporary security operations seen in Canada and resulted in the largest mass arrests in Canadian history.

Later that year, councillor Rob Ford was elected mayor of the city. His support was based on voters in the former suburbs, with the exception of East York; there, Ford remained highly unpopular with local residents, who at one point during East York's 2014 Canada Day parade, heckled him so mercilessly that he abandoned the parade halfway through its route and left the neighbourhood. Ford's election victory highlighted a political schism between the core and suburban Toronto at City Hall.

His political career, particularly his mayoralty, saw a number of personal and work-related controversies and legal proceedings. In 2013, he became embroiled in a substance abuse scandal, which was widely reported in national and foreign media. Following his admission, Ford refused to resign, but the city council voted to hand over certain mayoral powers and office staff to Deputy Mayor Norm Kelly for the remainder of Ford's term.

Favourable economic conditions and a high demand for housing spurred a condo boom in Toronto, with tens of thousands of upscale apartments constructed throughout the city.

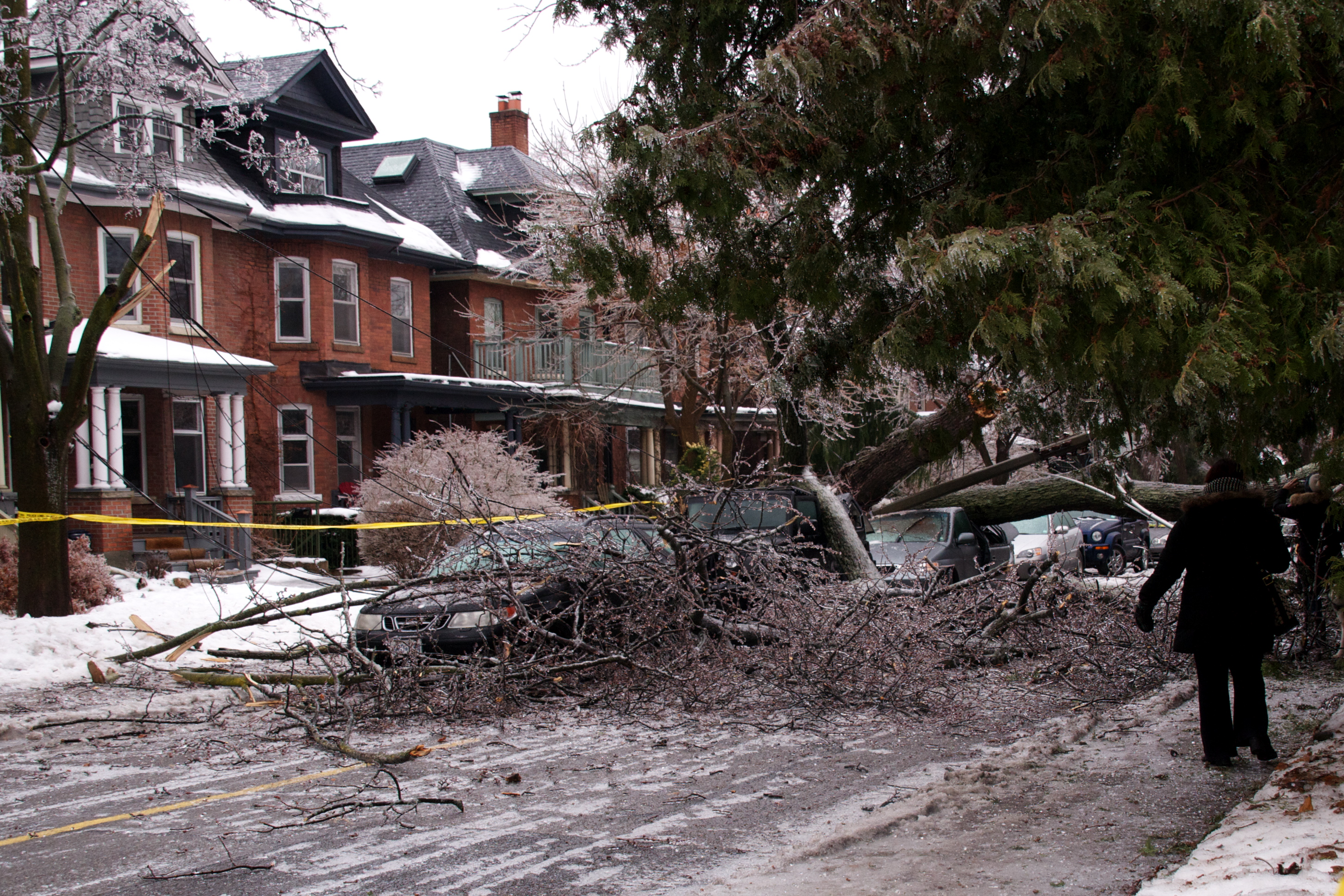
Damage from a fallen tree after the December 2013 North American storm complex passed through Toronto.

On July 8, 2013, severe flash flooding hit Toronto after an afternoon of slow-moving, intense thunderstorms. Toronto Hydro estimated 450,000 people were without power after the storm and Toronto Pearson International Airport reported 126 mm (5 in) of rain had fallen over five hours, more than during Hurricane Hazel. Within six months, on December 20, 2013, Toronto was brought to a halt by the worst ice storm in the city's history, rivalling the severity of the 1998 Ice Storm. At the height of the storm over 300,000 Toronto Hydro customers had no electricity or heating. Toronto hosted WorldPride in June 2014, and the Pan American Games in 2015. In 2017, Toronto FC (founded in 2007) won the MLS Cup. In 2019, the city's Toronto Raptors won the 2019 NBA Finals.

The city continues to grow and attract immigrants. A study by Toronto Metropolitan University showed that Toronto was the fastest-growing city in North America. The city added 77,435 people between July 2017 and July 2018. The Toronto metropolitan area was the second-fastest-growing metropolitan area in North America, adding 125,298 persons, compared to 131,767 in Dallas–Fort Worth–Arlington in Texas. The large growth in the Toronto metropolitan area is attributed to international migration to Toronto.

On March 23, 2020, a state of emergency was declared in Toronto by mayor John Tory, amidst the COVID-19 pandemic in Canada. This came six days after Ontario Premier Doug Ford declared a state of emergency in the province, which included prohibition of all public events of over 50 people (later reduced to 5 people on March 28), closure of bars and restaurants (with the exception that restaurants may continue to provide takeout and delivery services) as well as libraries, theatres, cinemas, schools and daycares.

Following Tory's resignation in 2023, Olivia Chow was elected to succeed him; she is the first woman to serve as mayor of Toronto since its amalgamation. In 2025, Line 6 Finch West opened to the public, which is the first new transit line since 2002's Line 4 Sheppard. This was followed by the opening of Line 5 Eglinton in February 2026. Toronto will host matches in the 2026 FIFA World Cup at BMO Field, named "Toronto Stadium" during the event.

== See also ==
- History of the Canadian National Exhibition
- History of Ontario
- History of neighbourhoods in Toronto
- History of the Jews in Toronto
- List of historic places in Toronto
- List of lost buildings and structures in Toronto
- List of National Historic Sites of Canada in Toronto
- List of oldest buildings and structures in Toronto
- Timeline of Toronto history
