= George Johnson (statistician) =

Canadian statistician (1837–1911)

George Johnson (1837–1911) was a Canadian statistician. He was born in Annapolis Royal, Nova Scotia in 1837. For some years he was the Editor of The Halifax Reporter and was subsequently the Ottawa correspondent for The Toronto Mail. From 1891 to 1904 he was the Dominion Statistician. He also edited the Canada Year Book from 1886 to 1904. He was the author of a number of works, including The Handbook of Canada and Alphabet of First Things in Canada. He was an honorary Fellow of the Royal Statistical Society and died in 1911.
