= The Empire (Toronto) =

Newspaper in Canada

- Founder: John A. Macdonald
- Founded: 1887
- Ceased publication: 1895
- Political alignment: Conservative

The Empire was a Canadian newspaper established in Toronto, Ontario, in 1887. Founded by John A. Macdonald, the Prime Minister of Canada and publishing rival of George Brown of The Globe, it was the voice of the conservatives in the city. Macdonald and Brown had been political rivals in Canada West, although they had co-operated to achieve Canadian Confederation. The Empire was founded when the previous conservative paper in Toronto, The Toronto Mail, declared itself independent of political parties in 1886.

After Macdonald's death in 1891, the Empire merged with The Toronto Mail to form The Mail and Empire in 1895. This merged with Brown's Globe to form The Globe and Mail in 1936.

== See also ==
- List of newspapers in Canada
