= The Toronto Mail =

Canadian newspaper

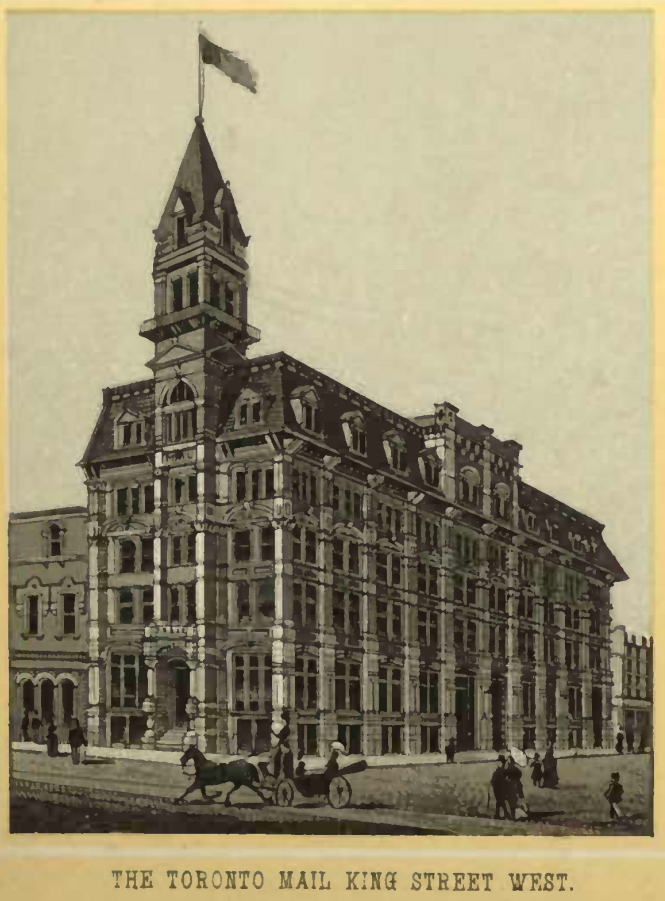
- The Mail Building, the paper's headquarters at Bay and King
- Founder: Thomas Charles Patteson
- Founded: March 30, 1872
- Ceased publication: February 6, 1895
- Political alignment: Conservative 1872–1886, then independent (1886–1895)
- Language: English
- Headquarters: The Mail Building - King Street West and Bay Street

The Toronto Mail was a newspaper in Toronto, Ontario which through corporate mergers became first The Mail and Empire, and then The Globe and Mail.

The Mail was founded in 1872 by Thomas Charles Patterson (b. 1836 in Patney, Wiltshire, England - died 1907 in Toronto). Patterson had been Postmaster of Toronto and was asked by the federal Conservative Party to become publisher of the newspaper. Patterson remained proprietor and editor until it changed hands with John Riordan (major creditor of the debts owed by the Mail) and Christopher William Bunting with the former assuming ownership.

Riordan died in 1884, but control of the paper went to his brother Charles Alfred Riordan in 1882 with Bunting remaining as director of the Mail.

It was the city's conservative paper until it declared itself independent of any political party in 1886. That prompted Prime Minister John A. Macdonald to found the Toronto Empire in 1887. The Mail eventually returned to Conservative roots when it merged with the Toronto Empire to form The Mail and Empire in 1895. Bunting and Charles Riordan remained with the new paper, but Bunting died in 1896 and Riordan sold his stake in 1927 to Izaak Walton Killam.

The Mail and Empire merged in 1936 with The Globe to form The Globe and Mail.

== Staff ==
- Kathleen Blake "Kit" Coleman – journalist, joined the paper in 1889
- Philip Dansken Ross – columnist
- Edmund Ernest Sheppard – columnist, left in 1883 for Toronto Evening News
- Martin Joseph Griffin, editor 1881–1885
- Edward Farrer – writer 1872–1873, 1875-1881 and later editor 1884-1892
- George R. Gregg, assistant editor
- George Johnson - Ottawa correspondent (1880s)

== See also ==
- List of newspapers in Canada

== See also ==
- Toronto Star
