= The Mail and Empire =

Former Canadian newspaper

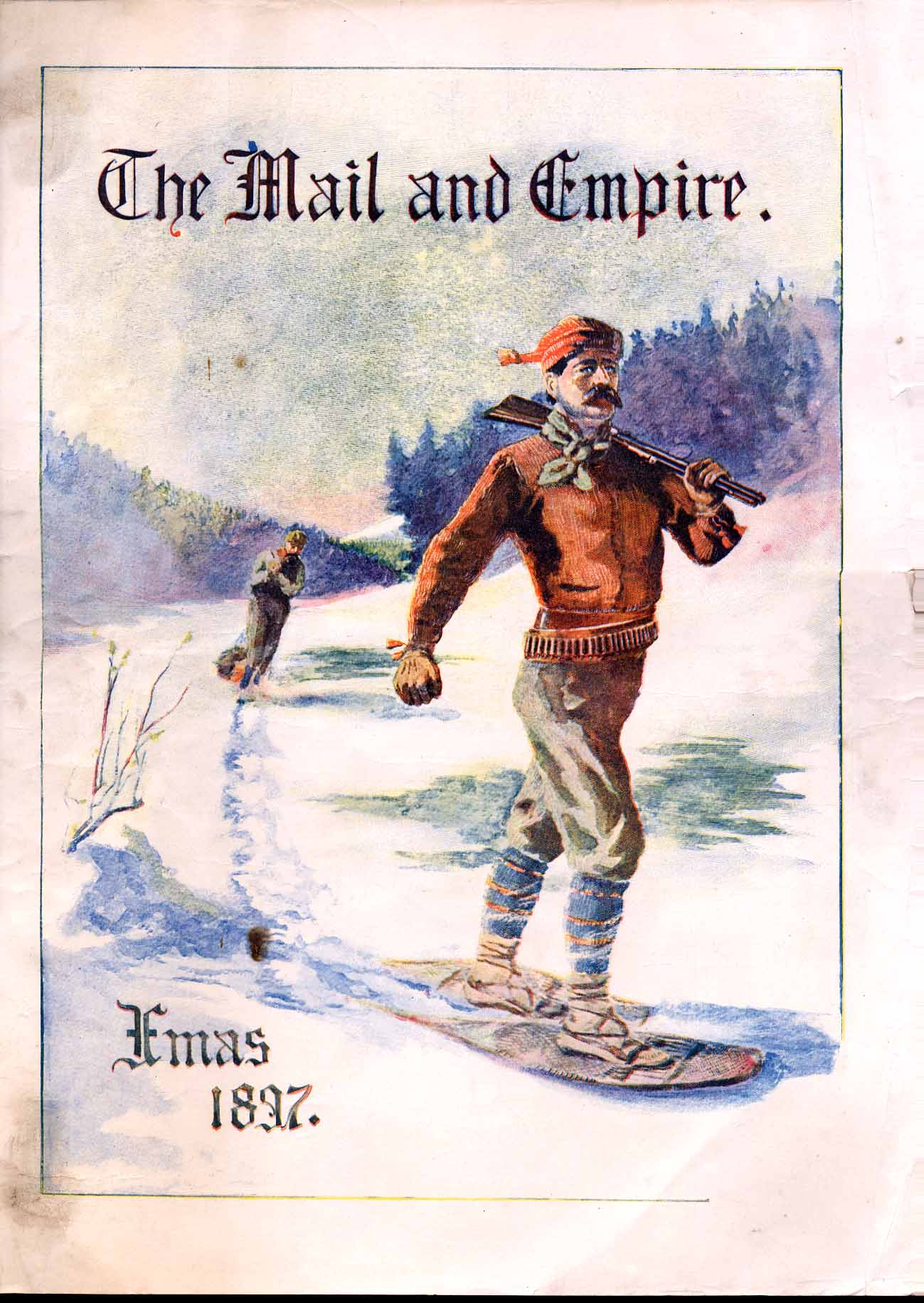
- The Mail and Empire, Christmas 1897
- Owner(s): Charles Aldred Riordan (1895–1927); Christopher William Bunting (general manager 1895–1896); Izaak Walton Killam (1927–1935)
- Founded: February 7, 1895
- Ceased publication: November 21, 1936
- Language: English
- Circulation: 118,000

The Mail and Empire was a Canadian newspaper formed from the 1895 merger of The Toronto Mail (owned by Charles Alfred Riordan and managed by Christopher William Bunting) and Toronto Empire, both conservative newspapers based in Toronto. It acquired the assets of The Toronto World in 1921 and merged with The Globe in 1936 to form The Globe and Mail.

== See also ==
- List of newspapers in Canada
