= The Globe (Toronto newspaper) =

Canadian newspaper (1844–1936)

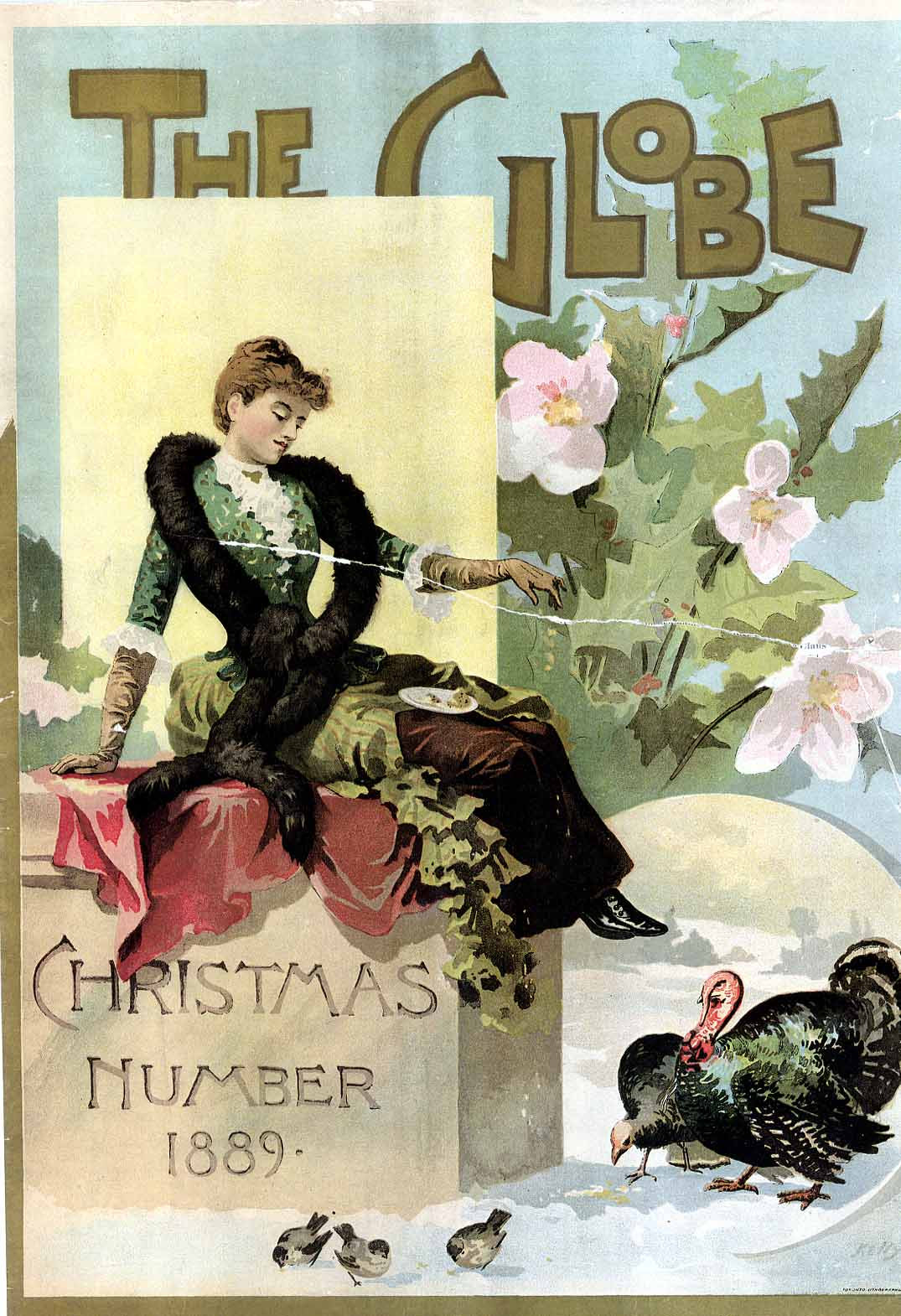
- The Globe's front page, 1889
- Founder: George Brown
- Founded: 1844
- Ceased publication: 1936

The Globe was a Canadian newspaper in Toronto, Ontario, founded in 1844 by George Brown as a Reform voice. It merged with The Mail and Empire in 1936 to form The Globe and Mail.

== History ==
The Globe is predated by a title of the same name, which ran from 1840 to 1841; they are of no relation.

The Globe began as a weekly newspaper on March 5, 1844, edited by George Brown, a Presbyterian immigrant from Scotland by way of New York City, where he and his father had edited newspapers. In August 1844, it began to be printed on the first cylinder press in Canada West. The press was able to print 1,250 papers in one hour, many more than the old Washington hand press which could only produce 200 an hour. In September 1846, the Globe became a semi-weekly, in 1849 it became weekly again, and soon tri-weekly editions were established. Its first office was on the southwest corner of King and Jordan streets on property that was transferred to him from Angus Dallas in 1850. It was responsible for launching the careers of many men who went on to make their names famous including, Erastus Wiman, William Edwards, and Charles Harcourt.

The Globe was popular for providing information on the anti-slavery movements in the United States, Great Britain, and the British North American colonies during the 1840s and 1850s and was one of the leading advocates of the Canadian anti-slavery movement. Brown filled his editorials with vehement ridicule of the Catholic Church, Jesuits, priests, nunneries, and every medieval superstition he could blame on the city's Irish and French Catholics. By 1872, it was the leading newspaper of the country, with a weekly circulation of over 45,000 including dailies and weeklies.

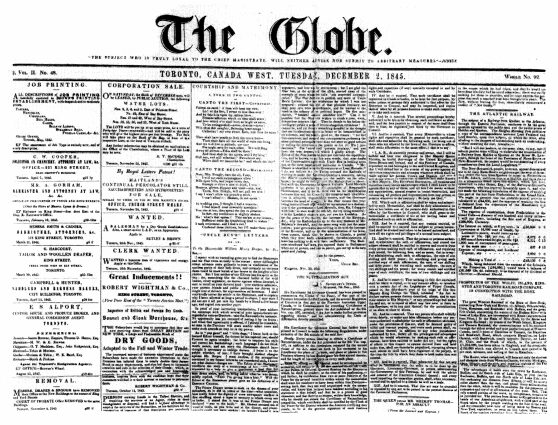
The Globe's format

The Globe was also known for having some of the most current news of the time. During the Crimean War, before the era of the Atlantic cable, it boasted great sales on European mail days. When the cable was established a reporter for the Globe, a Mr. Houston, was able to get the scoop on the English elections and release a special edition.

After the death of George Brown in 1882, John Cameron took over as editor.

=== Radical alignment and expansion ===
By the 1850s, The Globe was an independent newspaper and moved toward a radical, Clear Grit position. The first overseas correspondent from a Toronto newspaper was sent to Great Britain in 1851 by The Globe. On October 1, 1853, The Daily Globe appeared, and from 1861 to 1911 both morning and evening editions were published. In 1855, it acquired both The Examiner and The North American.

=== Emergence of The Globe and Mail ===
In 1936 it absorbed The Mail and Empire to form The Globe and Mail.

== See also ==
- History of Canadian newspapers
- List of newspapers in Canada
