= Media in Toronto =

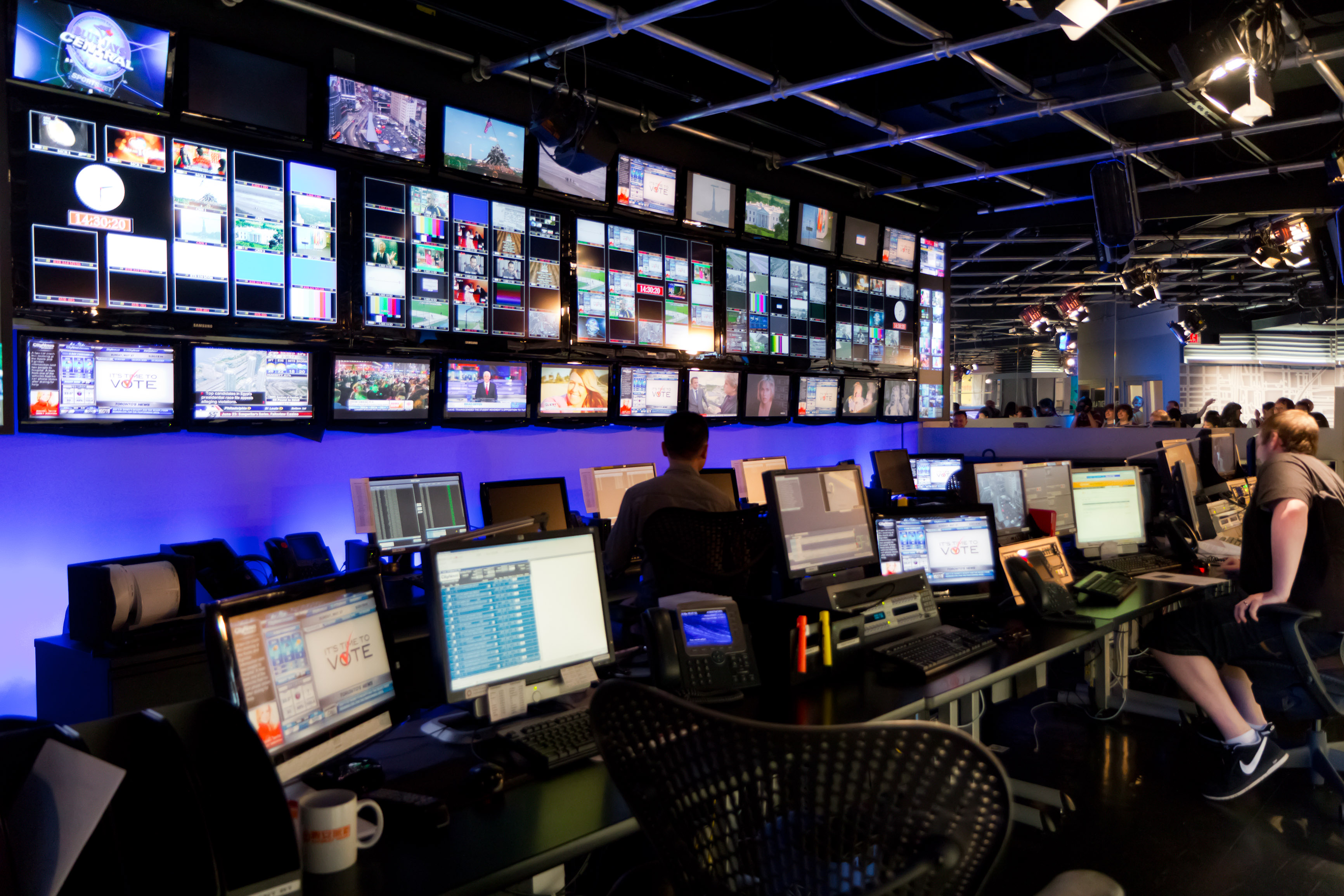
A production control room in Toronto's Rogers Studios for City and Omni Television. Both are subsidiaries of Rogers Media.

The media in Toronto encompasses a wide range of television and radio stations, as well as digital and print media outlets. These media platforms either service the entire city or are cater to a specific neighbourhood or community within Toronto. Additionally, several media outlets from Toronto extend their services to cover the Greater Toronto Area and the Golden Horseshoe region. While most media outlets in Toronto cater to local or regional audiences, there are also several national media outlets based in the city that distribute their services across Canada and caters to a national audience.

Toronto is the largest mass media market in Canada, and the third-largest market in North America, behind Chicago. As a result, several Canadian media companies and conglomerates are based in Toronto.

== TV stations ==
OTA virtual channel (PSIP)	OTA channel	Rogers Cable	Bell Fibe TV	Call Sign	Network	Notes
5.1	20 (UHF)	6	205	CBLT-DT	CBC Television	
9.1	9 (VHF)	8	201	CFTO-DT	CTV	
19.1	19 (UHF)	2	209	CICA-DT	TVOntario	Provincial public educational broadcaster
25.1	25 (UHF)	12	101	CBLFT-DT	Ici Radio-Canada Télé	Toronto's only OTA French language station.
40.1	26 (UHF)	14	207	CJMT-DT	Omni Television (OMNI 2)	Multicultural (Africa/Asia/Middle East), sister station to CFMT
41.1	17 (UHF)	3	203	CIII-DT	Global	
47.1	30 (UHF)	4	206	CFMT-DT	Omni Television (OMNI 1)	Multicultural (America/Caribbean/Europe), sister station to CJMT
57.1	18 (UHF)	7	204	CITY-DT	Citytv	
–	–	24	503	–	CP24	24-hour local news channel
–	–	–	1	–	TV1	Community channel for Bell Fibe TV subscribers

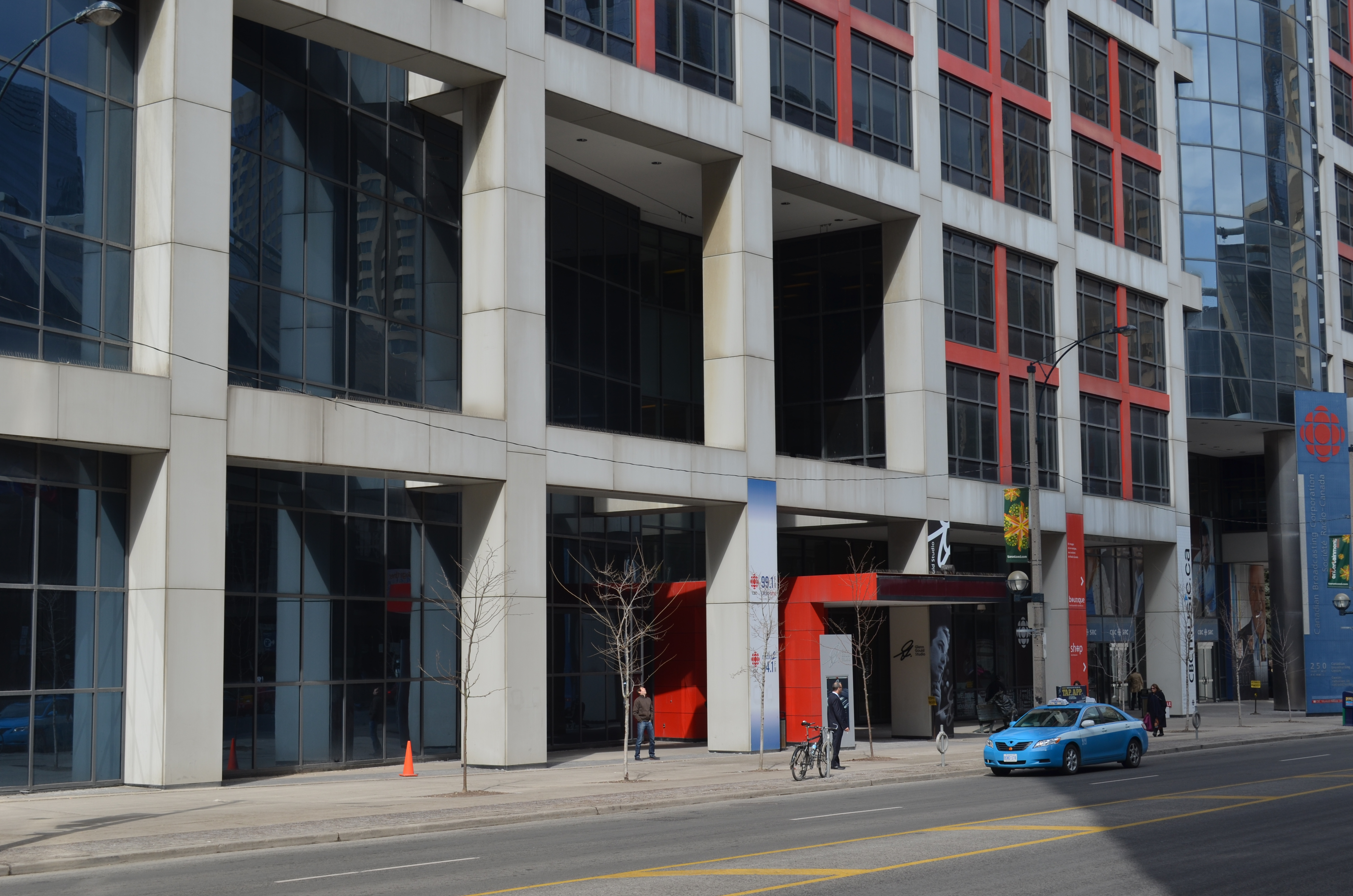
The Canadian Broadcasting Centre in Toronto is the English-language broadcasting headquarters for the CBC's radio and television service.

The incumbent cable provider in the Toronto area is Rogers Cable, which originally secured the cable franchise for most of the pre-amalgamation city of Toronto, including TFO and later purchased the systems in surrounding areas. Since 2010, Bell Fibe TV (an IPTV terrestrial service operated by Rogers' rival Bell Canada) has been available in most neighbourhoods in the Greater Toronto Area. Independent IPTV television services such as Vmedia and Zazeen have also become available.

American network affiliates on Toronto cable are piped in from Buffalo, New York, including WGRZ (NBC), WIVB-TV (CBS), WKBW-TV (ABC), WUTV (Fox), and WNED-TV (PBS).

Most of Canada's over-the-air and cable television networks also have national operations based in Toronto; for more information, see List of Canadian television channels.

== Radio ==
=== Toronto stations ===
==== AM ====
Frequency	Call sign	Branding	Format	Owner	Notes
AM 590	CJCL	Sportsnet 590 The Fan	sports	Rogers Media	
AM 640	CFMJ	Global News Radio 640 Toronto	talk	Corus Entertainment	
AM 680	CFTR	CityNews 680	news	Rogers Media	
AM 740	CFZM	Zoomer Radio	pop standards	ZoomerMedia	
AM 860	CJBC	Ici Radio-Canada Première	public news/talk	Canadian Broadcasting Corporation	French
AM 960	CKNT	960 CKNT	talk		
AM 1010	CFRB	Newstalk 1010	news/talk	Bell Media	CFRB also has a 1 kW shortwave repeater, CFRX at 6070 kHz (6.07 MHz)
AM 1050	CHUM	TSN Radio 1050	sports radio	Bell Media	
AM 1280	CJRU	CJRU.ca	campus/community	Ryerson University	
AM 1430	CHKT	Fairchild Radio	multilingual	Fairchild Radio	
AM 1540	CHIN	CHIN Radio	multilingual	CHIN Radio/TV International	Rebroadcaster at 91.9 FM. Station created by Johnny Lombardi
AM 1610	CHHA	Voces Latinas	Spanish community station	San Lorenzo Latin American Community Centre	
AM 1690	CHTO		multilingual	Canadian Hellenic Toronto Radio	

==== FM ====
Frequency	Call sign	Branding	Format	Owner	Notes
FM 88.1	CIND-FM	Indie88	indie rock	Central Ontario Broadcasting	Approved by the CRTC on September 12, 2012, on CKLN-FM's former frequency
FM 88.9	CIRV		multilingual	Frank Alvarez	used by Fairchild Radio for FM coverage
FM 89.5	CIUT	University of Toronto Community Radio	campus/community	University of Toronto campus radio	
FM 90.3	CJBC	Ici Musique	public music	Canadian Broadcasting Corporation	French
FM 91.1	CJRT	JAZZ.FM 91	jazz/public	CJRT-FM Inc.	
FM 91.9	CHIN-1	CHIN Radio	multilingual	CHIN Radio/TV International	Rebroadcaster of CHIN (AM), not to be confused with CHIN-FM
FM 92.5	CKIS	Kiss 92.5	CHR	Rogers Media	
FM 93.5	CFXJ	New Country 93.5	Country	Stingray Radio	
FM 94.1	CBL	CBC Music	public music	Canadian Broadcasting Corporation	formerly CBC Radio 2
FM 95.9	CJKX-FM-2	KX96	country	Durham Radio	Rebroadcaster of CJKX-FM Ajax
FM 96.3	CFMZ	Classical 96.3	classical music	ZoomerMedia	
FM 96.9	CKHC	Radio Humber	campus radio	Humber College	
FM 97.3	CHBM	Boom 97.3	adult hits	Stingray Radio	
FM 98.1	CHFI	98.1 CHFI	adult contemporary	Rogers Media	
FM 98.7	CKFG	Flow 98.7	hip-hop/R&B/World music	CINA Media Group	
FM 99.1	CBLA	CBC Radio One	public news/talk	Canadian Broadcasting Corporation	
FM 99.9	CKFM	Virgin Radio 99.9	CHR	Bell Media	
FM 100.7	CHIN	CHIN Radio	multilingual	CHIN Radio/TV International	
FM 101.3	CJSA	Diversity FM	multilingual	Diversity Media Group	
FM 102.7	CJRK	East FM 102.7	multilingual	East FM - 8041393 Canada Inc	
FM 103.9	CIRR	103.9 Proud FM	LGBT community/adult top 40	Evanov Communications	Last air date: August 31, 2023
FM 104.5	CHUM	CHUM 104.5	hot AC	Bell Media	
FM 105.1	CHOQ	Radio-Toronto	Franco-Ontarian community	Cooperative Radio-Toronto	French
FM 105.3	CKSC		Christian Radio	International Harvesters for Christ Evangelistic Associations Inc. (Scarborough)	(NEW approved April 28, 2021. Airdate To be announced)
FM 105.5	CHRY	Vibe 105–5	urban contemporary	Board of Directors of CHRY Community Radio, Inc.	
FM 107.1	CILQ	Q107	mainstream rock	Corus Entertainment	

=== Internet only ===
Frequency	Branding	Format	Notes
Internet only	DJFM	Dance	
Internet only	Classichitsonline	Classic hits	
Internet only	Texas gospel Canada	Southern gospel	
Internet only	RetroHits.ca	Oldies	
Internet only	CtuDance	Dance	
Internet only	Euro nation	Dance	
Internet only	Rootz Reggae Radio	Caribbean	
Internet only	Radio 7 Toronto	Multilingual	Polish
Internet only	Ciao Italia Radio	Multilingual	Italian
Internet only	Pure Pop Radio	Classic hits	
Internet only	Radio Pakistani Toronto	Multilingual	Urdu
Internet only	Power plant organization	Heavy metal	
Internet only	Radio NOVA Toronto	Multilingual	Russian, Ukrainian
Internet only	LuvBay	Urban/Caribbean/African pop	
Internet only	Radio tikoze ak Letèrnèl	Gospel	Haitian Creole
Internet only	Radio Megapolis Toronto	Multilingual	Russian
Internet only	TIME FM Toronto	Multilingual	Tamil
Internet only	Toronto Latin radio	Spanish Tropical/Urbano	Spanish
Internet only	Radio Echelon	Urban AC/Caribbean	
Internet only	Reality radio 101	Mainstream rock	
Internet only	SpiritLive	high school radio	
Internet only	Toronto Urbano Radio	Urbano	Spanish
Internet only	Radio Regent	Variety	
Internet only	Soul Provider	Urban oldies	
Internet only	Joy Radio	Christian	Formerly CJYE 1250 AM Oakville
Internet only	CJMR	Multilingual	Formerly CJMR 1320 AM Mississauga

=== Other stations ===
Numerous radio stations licensed to communities outside the City of Toronto are also marketed to the City of Toronto proper, as well as the rest of the Greater Toronto Area. This includes one American station.

==== AM ====
Frequency	Call sign	Branding	Format	Owner	Location	Notes
AM 530	CHLO		multilingual	Evanov Communications	Brampton	Formerly CIAO from 1987 to 2019
AM 770	WTOR		multicultural	Birach Broadcasting Corporation	Youngstown, New York	
AM 1350	CIRF		multilingual/Ethnic - South Asian	Radio Humsafar	Brampton	
AM 1580	CKDO		oldies	Durham Radio	Oshawa	CKDO has a rebroadcaster at 107.7 FM.
AM 1650	CINA		multicultural	Neeti Prakash Ray	Mississauga	

==== FM ====
Frequency	Call sign	Branding	Format	Owner	Location	Notes
FM 88.5	CKDX	Hot Country 88.5	country	Evanov Communications	Newmarket	
FM 90.7	CFU758	RAV-FM	high school radio/community	Hodan Nalayeh Secondary School	Thornhill	
FM 91.9	CKC455	CFRE	campus radio	Independent (student-run)	Mississauga	Campus radio station of the University of Toronto Mississauga.
FM 94.9	CKGE-FM	94.9 The Rock	rock	Durham Radio	Oshawa	
FM 95.3	CING	Energy 95.3	hot adult contemporary	Corus Entertainment	Hamilton	
FM 102.1	CFNY	102.1 The Edge	modern rock	Corus Entertainment	licensed for Brampton; transmitter and studios are in downtown Toronto	
FM 102.9	CKLH	Bounce 102.9	adult hits	Bell Media	Hamilton	
FM 103.5	CIDC	Z103.5	CHR	Evanov Communications	Orangeville	
FM 105.9	CFMS	The Region	multilingual	Bhupinder Bola (OBCI)	Markham	
FM 107.9	CJXY	Y108	active rock	Corus Entertainment	Burlington	

=== Former stations ===
Please see former City of Toronto radio stations at the Canadian Communications Foundation.

- CFBN
- CFCA
- CHEV
- CJVF-FM
- CJMR
- CJYE
- CKAV-FM
- CKLN-FM
- CKO
- CKRG-FM
- CFPT-FM

== Print ==
=== Newspapers ===
==== National dailies ====
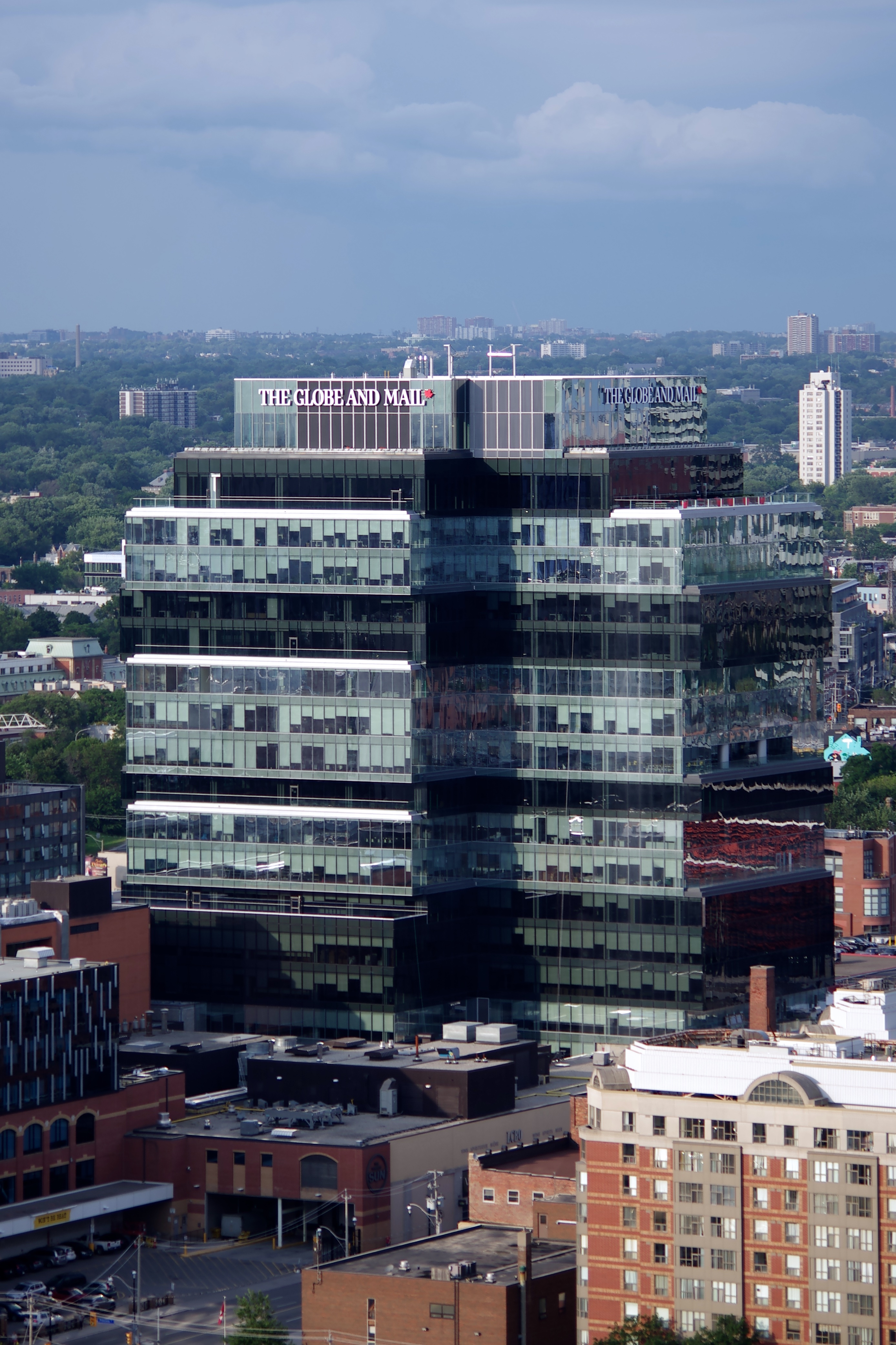
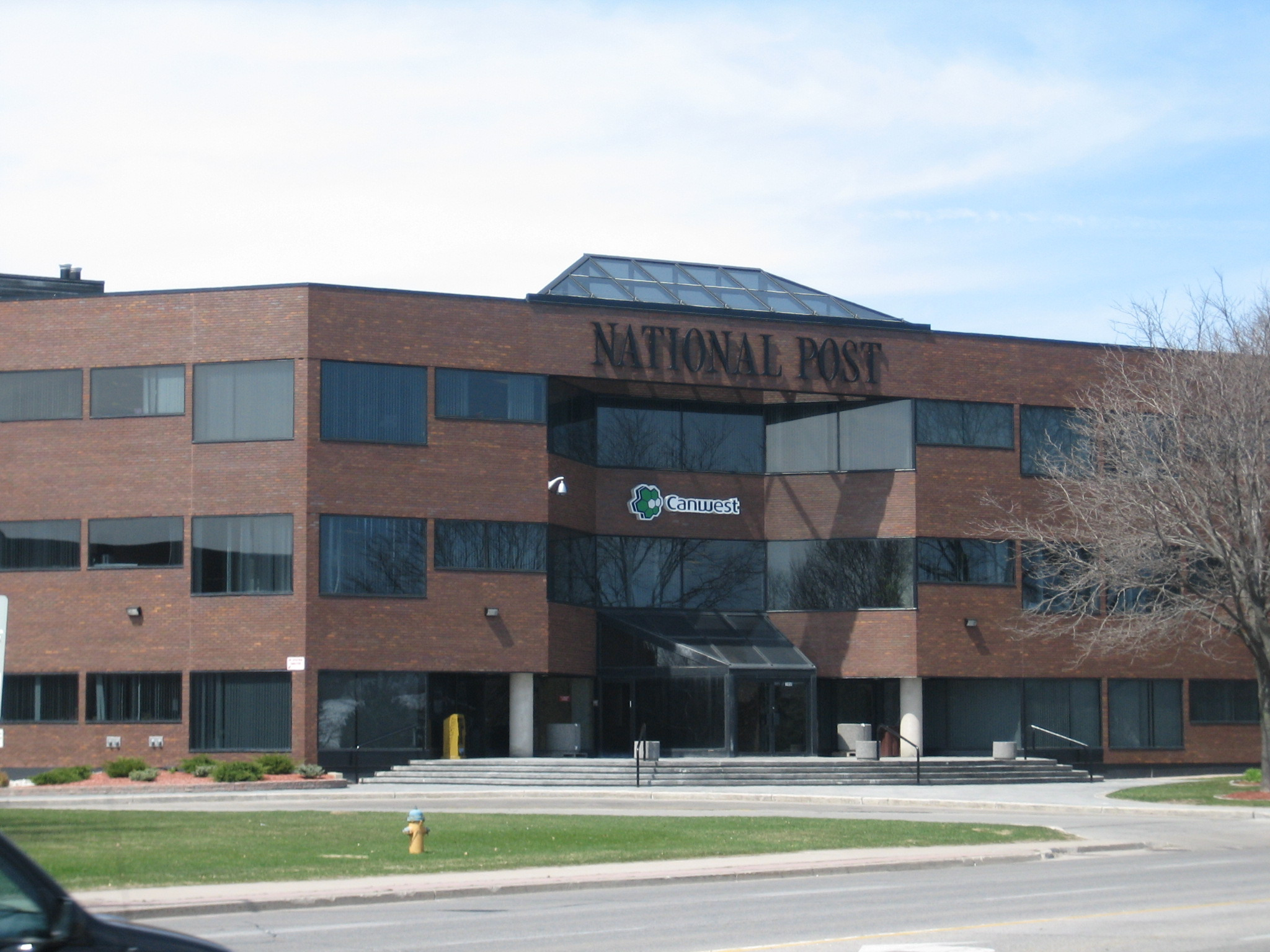
Headquarters of The Globe and Mail at the Globe and Mail Centre (left), and former HQ of the National Post (right). The two national dailies are both based in Toronto.
- The Globe and Mail
- National Post

==== Local dailies ====
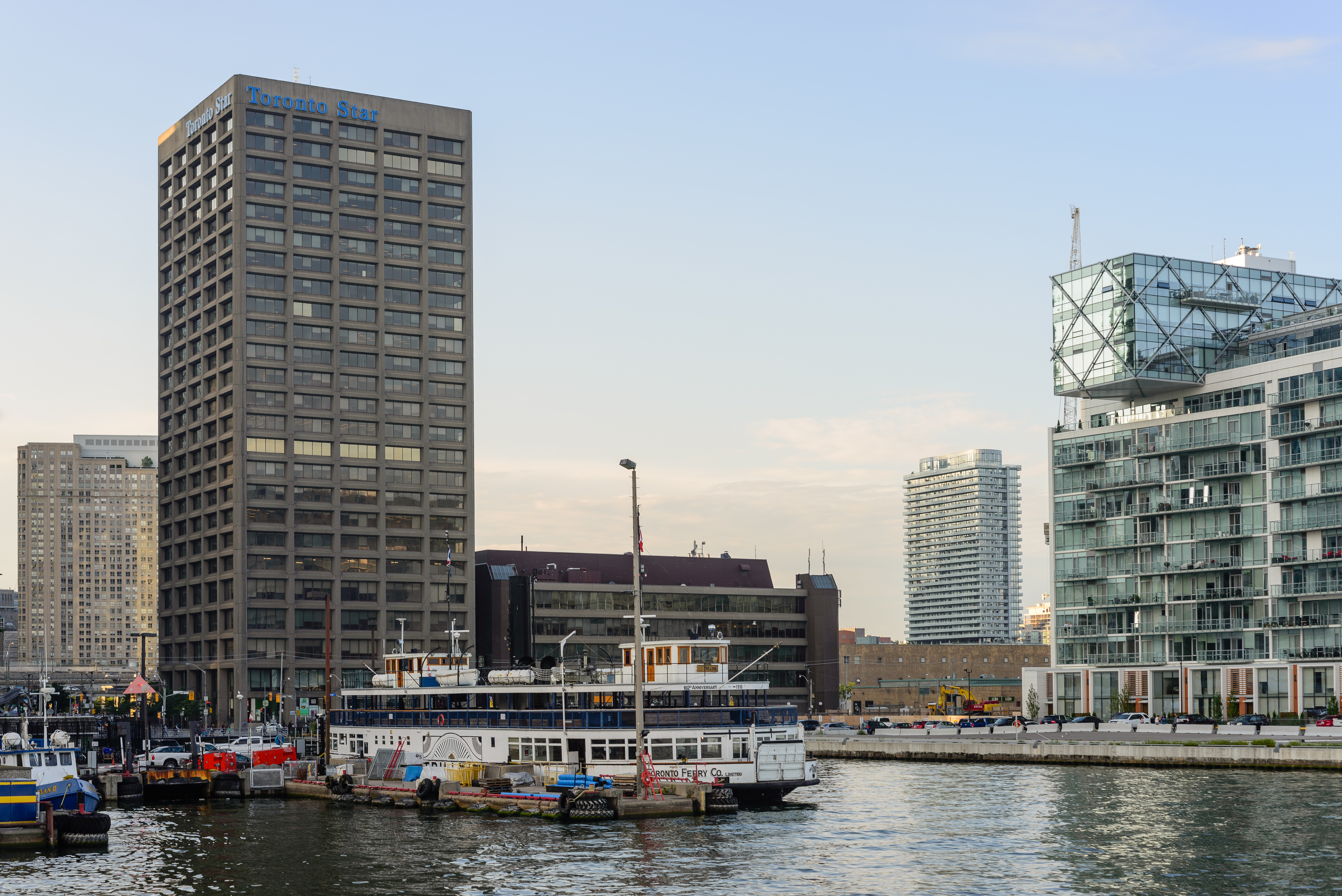
One Yonge Street from the Toronto Harbour. The building served as the headquarters for the Toronto Star, the highest-circulating local newspaper in Canada.

- Toronto Star
- Toronto Sun

==== Alternative ====
- NOW Magazine — entertainment weekly

==== Community and weekly newspapers ====
- Beach Metro News
- The Annex Gleaner
- L'Express - French language
- Le Métropolitain - French language
- The Liberty Gleaner
- Town Crier (Online-only)
- West End Phoenix
- The Marklander

==== Ethnic and multicultural newspapers ====
- Ajit Weekly - Punjabi language
- C C Times (加中時報) - simplified and traditional Chinese characters; weekly
- The Caribbean Camera - English language
- Corriere Canadese – Italian language
- Correio da Manhã Canadá - Portuguese language; twice-weekly
- El Centro - Spanish language; weekly
- El Popular – Spanish language
- Gazeta - Polish language; weekly (Online-only)
- Global Chinese Press (環球華報) - traditional Chinese characters; free weekly
- Kanadai-Amerikai Magyars - Hungarian language; weekly
- Kanadan Sanomat - Finnish language; weekly
- Korea Times – Korean language
- Milénio Stadium - Portuguese language; weekly
- New Star Times (星星生活報) - traditional Chinese characters; free weekly
- Pakistan Post - English language; weekly
- Pride News Magazine - English language
- Russian Express - Russian language; weekly
- Salam Toronto - Persian English languages; weekly
- Share - English language; weekly
- Sunday Times - Urdu language; weekly
- Thangatheepam - Tamil language; weekly
- The Weekly Voice - Punjabi and Hindi languages
- Thời Báo - Vietnamese language
- Today Daily news (現代日報)traditional Chinese characters
- Toronto Caribbean Newspaper - English language
- Toronto Hispano - Spanish language
- Urdu Khabarnama - Urdu language; weekly
- Weekly Hankook - Korean language
- Wiadomości - Polish language; weekly

==== Student newspapers ====
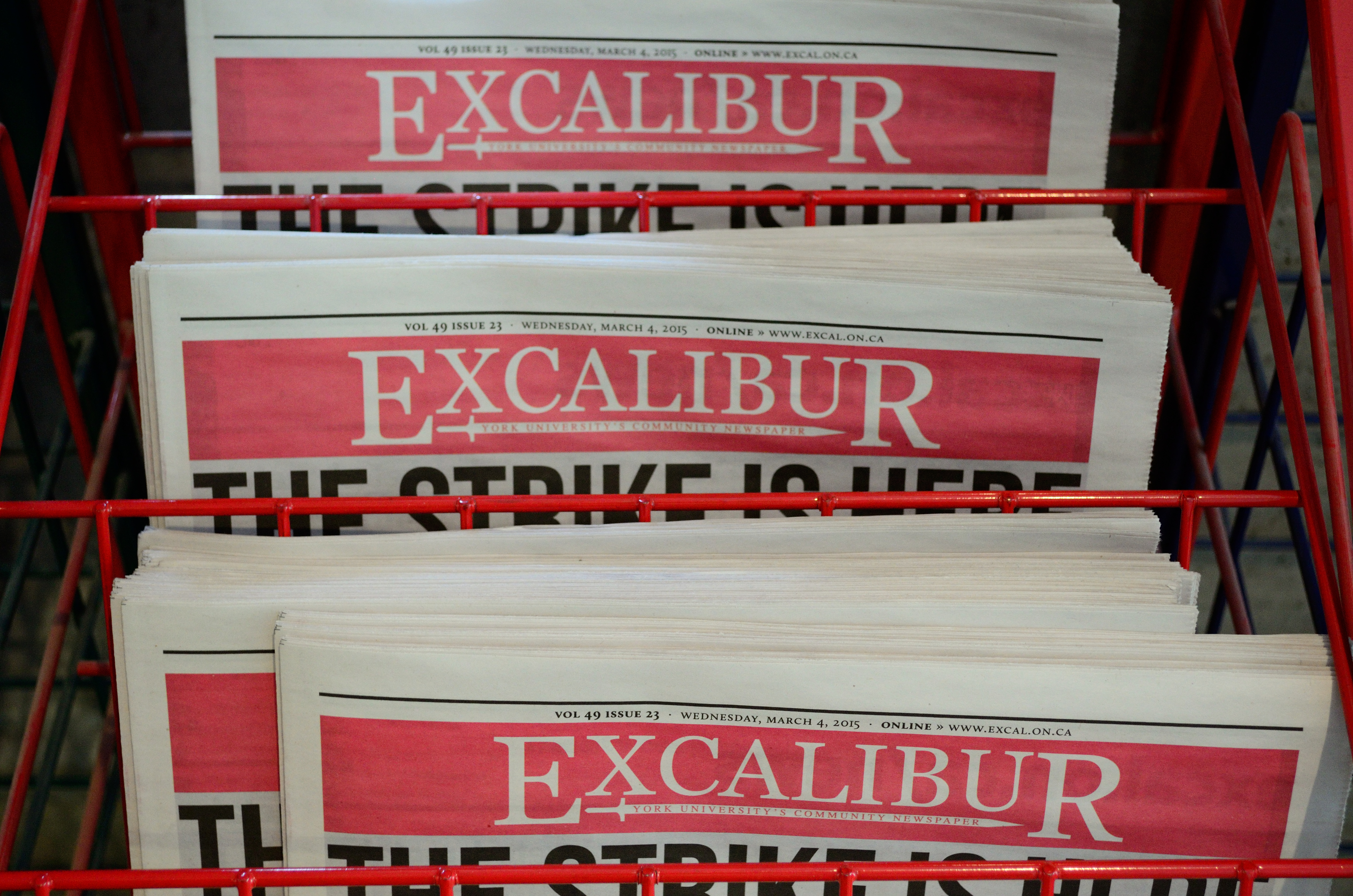
Copies for the Excalibur, a student newspaper for York University.

- Canadian University Press
- The Dialog - George Brown Polytechnic
- East York Observer - Centennial College
- The Excalibur - York University
- The Eyeopener - Toronto Metropolitan University
- Humber Et Cetera - Humber Polytechnic
- The Mike - University of St. Michael's College, University of Toronto
- The Newspaper - University of Toronto
- On the Record - Toronto Metropolitan University
- Senecan - Seneca College
- The Scene - Seneca College
- The Strand - Victoria College, University of Toronto
- The Toronto Observer - Centennial College
- The Underground - University of Toronto Scarborough
- The Varsity - University of Toronto
- The Woodsworth Howl - Woodsworth College, University of Toronto

==== Former newspapers ====
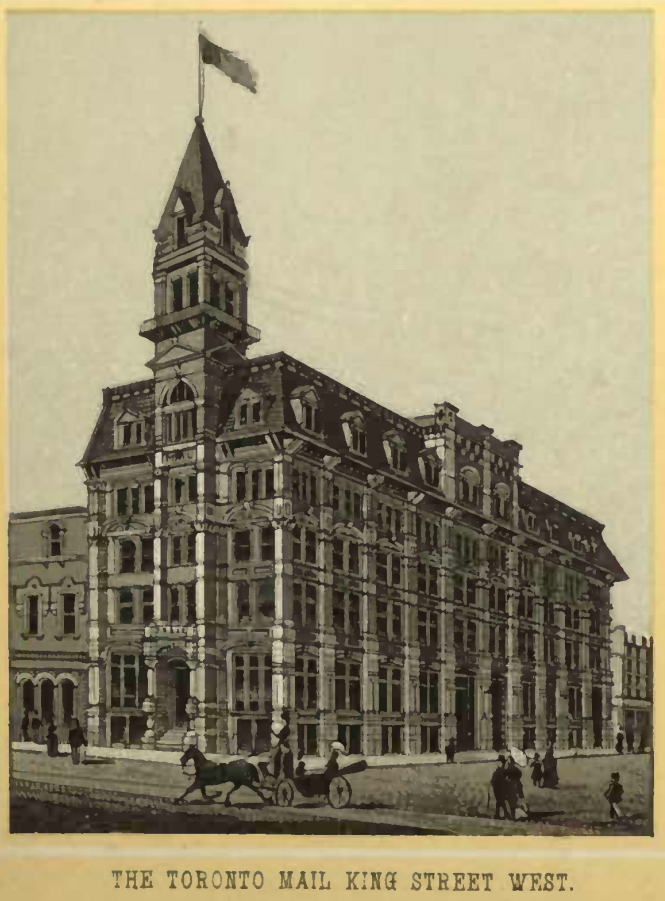
The Mail Building in Toronto c. 1870. It headquartered The Toronto Mail newspaper, which operated from 1872 to 1895, when it merged with Toronto Empire to form The Mail and Empire.

- 24 Hours- Toronto Edition (2003—2017)
- Bloor West Villager (1971-2023)
- City Centre Mirror (2009-2023)
- das Journal - German language bi-weekly (2011-2023)
- East York-Beach Mirror (1995-2023)
- Etobicoke Guardian (1952-2023)
- Eye Weekly (1991-2011)
- The Globe (1844-1936); merged with The Mail and Empire to form The Globe and Mail
- The Leader - (1852-1878)
- The Mail and Empire - (1895-1936); merged with The Globe to form The Globe and Mail
- Ming Pao Daily News (1993-2026)
- The News - (1881-1919); briefly changed name to The Times prior to closing
- North York Mirror (1957-2023)
- Parkdale-Liberty Villager (2008-2016)
- Scarborough Mirror (1962-2023)
- The Sentinel - (1877-1896); newspaper of the Orange Order
- Sol Português/Portuguese Sun - Portuguese language (1983-2023)
- South Asian Observer (2001-2020)
- StarMetro (newspaper) – formerly Metro, Metro Today, GTA Today (2000-2019)
- The Star Weekly - (1910-1973)
- The Telegraph - (1866-1872)
- The Toronto World (1880-1921)
- Toronto Sunday World - absorbed by the Star Weekly in 1924
- Toronto Empire - (1887-1895); merged with The Mail to form The Mail and Empire
- The Toronto Mail - (1872-1895); merged with The Empire to form The Mail and Empire
- Toronto Telegram - (1876-1971); much of the staff then formed the Toronto Sun
- Toronto Special
- York Guardian (1996-2023)

=== Magazines ===
- Canadian Living
- Canadian Business
- Chatelaine
- Elle
- Exclaim!
- FASHION
- Foodism Toronto (magazine)
- Latinos Multicultural Magazine - Bilingual (English/Spanish)
- Maclean's - national magazine based in Toronto
- MoneySense
- Spacing
- Sportsnet magazine
- This Magazine
- Toronto Life
- The Walrus
- Weddingbells
- Xtra!

==== Former magazines ====
- fab (1994-2013)
- FutuRéale
- Grip (1873-1894)
- Outlooks
- Saturday Night (1887-2005)
- Shameless (2004-2023)
- Women's Post (2002-2019)

== Online-only ==
- Best of Toronto
- blogTO
- Curiocity
- Daily Hive
- Dished Toronto
- Flare - formerly in print.
- Gent's Post
- Narcity Media
- Sing Tao Daily (Canada)
- Streets of Toronto - formerly known as Post City Magazines
- Toronto.com
- Toronto Guardian
- WanderEater magazine
- View the Vibe - also syndicated onto the TTC media portal "Tconnect".

== Book publishers ==
- Coach House Press
- Cormorant Books
- House of Anansi Press
- McClelland and Stewart
- Tundra Books
- University of Toronto Press
- ECW Press
- Optimum Publishing International
