= CFMX =

CFMX may refer to:

- CFMX-FM, a radio station in Cobourg, ON
- CFMZ-FM, Toronto, which carried the CFMX-FM-2 call letters until September 2006.
- CKFM-FM, a radio station in Toronto that briefly used the CFMX call letters between June 2007 and August 2007.
