= Whiteoaks Communications Group =

Canadian radio broadcasting company

- Type: Private
- Industry: Radio broadcasting, internet radio
- Founded: 1956 as CHWO Radio Limited
- Headquarters: Oakville, Ontario
- Area served: Golden Horseshoe
- Key people: Caine family
- Parent: Caineco Ltd. (Estate of Michael Caine)
- Subsidiaries: Golden Horseshoe Broadcasting Ltd., Trafalgar Broadcasting Ltd
- Website: Whiteoaks Communications Group

Whiteoaks Communications Group is a media company based in Oakville, Ontario that owns several radio stations in Ontario as well as Christian podcasting platform, Faith Strong Today Media. The company was founded in 1956 as CHWO Radio Limited by Howard and Jean Caine with the launch of CHWO radio in Oakville. After Howard Caine died in 1967, the company was run by his widow, Jean. Their son, Michael Caine (1949–2024) subsequently became company president. The current president is Michael Caine's son, Matthew Caine. Whiteoaks is owned by the Caine family through their holding company, Caineco.

In 1974, the company was granted a license to found CJMR to serve Mississauga operating the stations as the "Golden Horseshoe Radio Network". CJYE was founded in 2001 and took over the 1250 AM frequency formerly held by CHWO when that station moved to 740 AM and rebranded as "Prime Time Radio", which also became the name the company operated under until 2008 when CHWO 740 was sold to Moses Znaimer who relaunched it as Zoomer Radio.

In 2024, Whiteoaks purchased four stations from Bell Media, CKLH-FM in Hamilton, Ontario and three St. Catharines, Ontario-based stations: CHRE-FM, CHTZ-FM, and CKTB. Whiteoaks created a subsidiary, Golden Horseshoe Broadcasting Ltd. to own and operate the four Hamilton-Niagara Peninsula stations. Another subsidiary, Trafalgar Broadcasting Ltd., owns and operates CJYE and CJMR.

In January 2026 two Whiteoaks stations, CJMR and CJYE (Joy Radio) transitioned to an online radio-only presence, marketed as "digital first", and ceased broadcasting on their respective AM frequencies.

City	Call Sign	Frequency	Band	Branding/Format	Format	Acquired
Mississauga	CJMR	NA	internet	CJMR	multilingual	1974
Oakville	CJYE	NA	internet	Joy Radio	Christian	2001
Hamilton	CKLH-FM	102.9	FM	Legend 102.9	adult hits	2024
St. Catharines	CHRE-FM	105.7	FM	Dream 105.7	adult contemporary	2024
St. Catharines	CHTZ-FM	97.7	FM	97.7 HTZ-FM	active rock	2024
St. Catharines	CKTB	610	AM	610 CKTB	talk radio	2024

Former stations

City	Call Sign	Frequency	Band	Branding/Format	Format	Time	Current status
Oakville	CHWO	740	AM	Prime-time Radio	easy listening, adult standards, MOR	1956–2008	Sold to Moses Znaimer (MZ Media) and renamed CFZM
