= CJVF-FM =

Former multilingual radio station in Toronto

Coordinates: 43°48′28″N 79°16′16″W

- Toronto, Ontario; Canada
- Frequency: 102.7 MHz
- Branding: Vanakkam FM

Programming
- Format: Multilingual

Ownership
- Owner: Subanasiri Vaithilingam; (105.9 FM Ltd.)

History
- First air date: 2012
- Last air date: March 16, 2016

Technical information
- ERP: 6.5 watts

CJVF-FM was a multilingual/ethnic radio station which broadcast at 102.7 MHz in Scarborough, Ontario, Canada. Owned locally by Subanasiri Vaithilingam, the station broadcast with an effective radiated power of 6.5 watts (non-directional antenna with an effective height of antenna above average terrain of 63.4 metres), with a transmitter located on top of an apartment building near Woodside Square at Finch and McCowan in Scarborough, and studios also located in Scarborough.

The license to the station was granted by the CRTC on December 7, 2011, with the stipulation that its programming consist of 60% Tamil, 20% Punjabi, 10% Filipino, and 10% English language programming.

The radio station commenced broadcasting in March 2012 on 105.9 FM, though broadcasting exclusively in Tamil. The radio station was the first all-Tamil broadcaster in North America.

On November 7, 2012, Vaithilingam submitted an application to the CRTC to change CJVF-FM's frequency from 105.9 FM to 102.7 FM. The change was required due to the sign on of neighbouring CFMS-FM in Markham, also located on 105.9 FM. The CRTC granted approval on January 30, 2014. On December 18, 2014, Vaithilingam applied to move CJVF-FM again, this time from 102.7 MHz to 105.3 MHz (due to a new station sign on), as well as seeking a power increase from 7 to 24 watts (38 watts Max. ERP), raising antenna height, relocate the transmitter and changing radiation pattern from non-directional to directional. During this time, the station suffered from poor management, lack of funds and failure to pay their workers for months. Because of this, numerous petitions were filed against the station. The application was denied by the CRTC on March 16, 2016, and resulted in the complete shutdown of the station.
