= CFMS =

CFMS may refer to:

- Canadian Federation of Medical Students, the national body that represents medical undergraduate trainees across Canada
- Canadian Forces Medical Service, the medical support for the Canadian Forces both at home and abroad
- CFMS-FM, a radio station in Markham, Ontario, Canada
- California Federation of Mineralogical Societies
- Centre For Modelling and Simulation, Bristol, UK
