= CARP (Canada) =

CARP, formally incorporated as the Canadian Association of Retired Persons, is a national, nonpartisan, not for profit association that advocates on behalf of Canadians as they age. The organization states that its purpose is to promote social change in order to bring financial security, equitable access to health care, and freedom from discrimination to its members.

CARP was founded in Toronto by Lillian and Murray Morgenthau in 1985. CARP. claims over 350,000 members across Canada. Moses Znaimer replaced Lillian Morgenthau as the President of the Board of Directors of C.A.R.P in 2009. CARP has participated in the debates around pensions and seniors' driving.

CARP was criticized during the 2025 Canadian election for partisan activity when it hosted an event for Conservative Party of Canada leader Pierre Poilievre during which CARP chairman Moses Znaimer appeared to endorse Poilievre from the stage. In an exchange outside the event when Znaimer was criticized for hosting a "very partisan event", Znaimer replied "that's right" and when asked why he gave a glowing introduction to Poilievre, replied "because I agree with him."

While formally a non-profit, CARP, has a cluster of affiliated for-profit businesses affiliated with CARP chair Moses Znaimer, who owns ZoomerMedia, or with CARPs founder Lillian and Murray Morgenthau including a cellular company (Zoomer wireless), a magazine (Zoomer magazine), a travel agency, a dating site, and Fifty-Plus.Net International Inc. This has led to charges of conflict of interest with one financial consultant observing that "CARP presents itself as an advocate for seniors, making recommendations for changes in tax and other policies affecting pensions, securities and accounting matters," but that "the interests of financial service companies and public issuers paying royalties or advertising revenues to the Morgenthau family affiliates are contrary to the interest of seniors."

In February 2008, Moses Znaimer, at the time recently named the executive director of CARP, acquired Kemur Publishing and Fifty-Plus.Net International. The two companies had originally been established by CARP's founders Lillian and Murray Morgenthau to house for-profit publishing and internet businesses that could not fall directly under the non-profit association; they provided revenue to CARP via royalties and other business agreements with the organization. Znaimer acquired the companies for $13.1 million in a reverse takeover, and reorganized them under ZoomerMedia which went public on the TSX Venture Exchange in July of that year.
