= CFGI-FM =

First Nations community radio station in Ontario, Canada

Coordinates: 44°22′22″N 79°18′46″W

- Georgina Island, Ontario; Canada
- Frequency: 92.3 MHz
- Branding: Nish Radio 92.3

Programming
- Format: First Nations community radio

Ownership
- Owner: Georgina Island First Nations Communications

History
- First air date: 2001
- Former frequencies: 102.7 MHz (2001–2013)
- Call sign meaning: Georgina Island

Technical information
- Class: A1
- ERP: 650 watts

Links
- Website: nish923.ca

CFGI-FM is a Canadian radio station, airing at 92.3 FM in Georgina Island, Ontario. Licensed by the CRTC in 2001, the station airs a community radio format for the area's First Nations community. The station originally began broadcasting at 102.7 FM.

On March 15, 2013, the CRTC approved the station's application to move from 102.7, to 92.3 MHz, and by increasing the ERP from 250 to 650 watts on a non-directional antenna, and the EHAAT from 19.3 to 24 metres. The frequency change was in response to CFGI-FM being first-adjacent to a new radio station, ZoomerMedia's CFMO-FM in nearby Collingwood, which would have caused significant interference between the two stations. In response to this, ZoomerMedia entered into an agreement with Georgina Island First Nations, in which ZoomerMedia agreed to supply CFGI-FM with new transmitting equipment, refurbish its transmitting antenna and cover the costs related to preparing applications for the CRTC.
