= CKLH-FM =

Radio station in Hamilton, Ontario

Coordinates: 43°20′12″N 79°52′06″W

- Hamilton, Ontario; Canada
- Broadcast area: Greater Toronto and Hamilton Area, Waterloo Region, Niagara Region
- Frequency: 102.9 MHz (HD Radio)
- Branding: Legend 102.9

Programming
- Format: Adult hits
- Subchannels: HD2: CKTB simulcast; HD3: Joy Radio

Ownership
- Owner: Whiteoaks Communications Group; (Golden Horseshoe Broadcasting Limited)

History
- First air date: October 7, 1986
- Call sign meaning: "Les Horton"

Technical information
- Licensing authority: CRTC
- Class: B
- ERP: 40,300 watts
- HAAT: 122 metres (400 ft)

Links
- Website: legend.fm

CKLH-FM (102.9 MHz) is a Canadian radio station in Hamilton, Ontario. The station broadcasts an adult hits format under the branding Legend 102.9 and is owned by Whiteoaks Communications Group. CKLH's studios are located at 25 Main Street West in Downtown Hamilton, while its transmitter is located atop the Niagara Escarpment on King Road, near the city boundaries of Hamilton and Burlington.

== History ==
The station received CRTC approval on May 8, 1986, and was launched on October 7, 1986, by Armadale Communications, the owner of CKOC. The "LH" in the call sign stood for Les Horton, CKOC's first broadcast engineer. The station aired an easy listening format as “K103 FM.” On June 1, 1992, CKLH flipped to adult contemporary, and rebranded as “102.9 K-Lite.”

Armadale sold the stations to London Communications in 1993. London Communications subsequently sold them to Telemedia in 1999, and Telemedia was itself acquired by Standard Broadcasting in 2002. In October 2007, Astral Media acquired Standard Broadcasting's terrestrial radio and television assets, including CKLH. Shortly after Astral acquired the station, CKLH adopted a more Adult Top 40 format; this ended in November 2009 when the station returned to its adult contemporary status after Boxing Day 2009, and regarding the flip from AC to adult hits at then-sister CJEZ in Toronto, which became CHBM after that.

With the merger of Astral Media and Bell Media, CKLH became a Bell Media Radio station on July 5, 2013.

As part of a mass format reorganization by Bell Media, on May 18, 2021, CKLH flipped to adult hits under the Bounce branding.

On February 8, 2024, Bell announced a restructuring that included the sale of 45 of its 103 radio stations to seven buyers, subject to approval by the CRTC, including CKLH, to be sold to Whiteoaks Communications Group. Hearings to consider the applications to purchase CKLH-FM commenced on October 8, 2024.

The CRTC approved the purchase on December 19, 2024. On June 16, 2025, Whiteoaks rebranded CKLH as Legend 102.9 maintaining a similar format.

== Former logos ==
2014-2021	2021-2025

== Notes ==
The 102.9 FM frequency in Hamilton was previously used by an unrelated radio station called CJSH-FM which was owned by The Hamilton Spectator that operated from 1948 until it shutdown in 1954.
