= CHRE-FM =

Radio station in St. Catharines

Coordinates: 43.15395°N 79.24698°W

- St. Catharines, Ontario; Canada
- Broadcast area: Niagara Region
- Frequency: 105.7 MHz
- Branding: Dream 105.7

Programming
- Format: Adult contemporary Christmas music (Nov-Dec)

Ownership
- Owner: Whiteoaks Communications Group; (Golden Horseshoe Broadcasting Limited)
- Sister stations: CKTB, CHTZ-FM

History
- First air date: March 20, 1967
- Former call signs: CHSC-FM (1967–1979)
- Call sign meaning: Redmond, former owner, or "Catharines", broadcast area

Technical information
- Class: B
- ERP: 50,000 watts
- HAAT: 119.5 metres (392 ft)

Links
- Website: dream1057.com

CHRE-FM (105.7 FM, "Dream 105.7") is a radio station licensed to St. Catharines, Ontario. Owned by Whiteoaks Communications Group, it broadcasts an adult contemporary format. For much of November and December, it switches to Christmas Music. CHRE shares studios with its sister stations, CKTB and CHTZ-FM, in "Oak Hill Mansion", the former home of William Hamilton Merritt, at 12 Yates Street in downtown St. Catharines. Its transmitter is on Cataract Road in Thorold, sharing its tower with CHTZ-FM.

== History ==
On March 20, 1967, the station signed on the air. Its owner was Radio Station CHSC Ltd., along with CHSC AM 1220 (now CFAJ). At first, CHSC-AM-FM simulcast much of their programming.

By 1970, the two stations were doing their own programming with CHSC-FM adopting a "Beautiful Music" format. During this time the station had a number of popular specialty programs. "A Starlight Concert" heard weeknights from 10 to 11pm features light classical music introduced by Francis Kirton who became the station's fine arts director. Kirton also hosted the Sunday morning programs "Variety Theatre" featuring condensations of popular operettas recorded by the Reader's Digest Association, "Concert in the Park" featuring marches and brass band music, "Waltz Time", a half-hour of familiar music in 3/4 time and "At the Console" showcasing the world's great theatre organs.

Other specialty programs included "Ray Wickens' Broadway" hosted by British theatre aficionado Ray Wickens and featuring full original cast recordings; and "The Golden Age of Comedy" hosted by Armand Romagnoli and Mark Lawrence presenting classic comedy routines and old-time radio comedies. For a time in the late 1970s the station also carried the syndicated version of "The CBS Radio Mystery Theatre". The station's most popular program was "Howard Cable Presents" hosted by Howard Cable who was, at the time, the music director for the Imperial Room at the Fairmont Royal York hotel in Toronto. The program showcased many of the performers appearing at the Imperial Room as well as popular songs from shows and movies, Big Band favorites and Classical music.

On July 1, 1979, the callsign was changed to CHRE-FM for station owner R.E. (Robert) Redmond. By 1985, Redmond determined that the "beautiful music" audience was rapidly aging and opted to switch to a soft rock/adult contemporary format geared to a younger audience. At this time, all of the specialty programs were dropped.

The parent company became known as Redmond Communications in 1985 and was granted a license to open CJEZ-FM (now CHBM-FM) in Toronto. The station was subsequently sold to Affinity Radio Group in 1999.

Affinity was acquired by Telemedia the following year, and Telemedia was itself bought out by Standard Broadcasting in 2002.

In October 2007, Astral Media acquired Standard Broadcasting's terrestrial radio and television assets, including CHRE.

On July 5, 2013, Bell Media officially took ownership of Astral Media, and as a result, CHRE became a part of Bell Media's radio station group.

Former "EZ Rock" logo until 2020

In January 2015, CHRE-FM's first home, the former CHSC studios at 36 Queenston Street in St. Catharines, was demolished; its land will be used for a four-storey apartment building.

On December 27, 2020, as part of a mass format reorganization by Bell Media Radio, CHRE rebranded as "Move 105.7". While the station would run jockless for the first week of the format, on-air staff would return on January 4, 2021. CHRE was the last radio station in Ontario under the "EZ Rock" branding, which continued to exist on a chain of Bell Media radio stations in British Columbia, before they were flipped to the adult hits "Bounce" brand in May 2021.

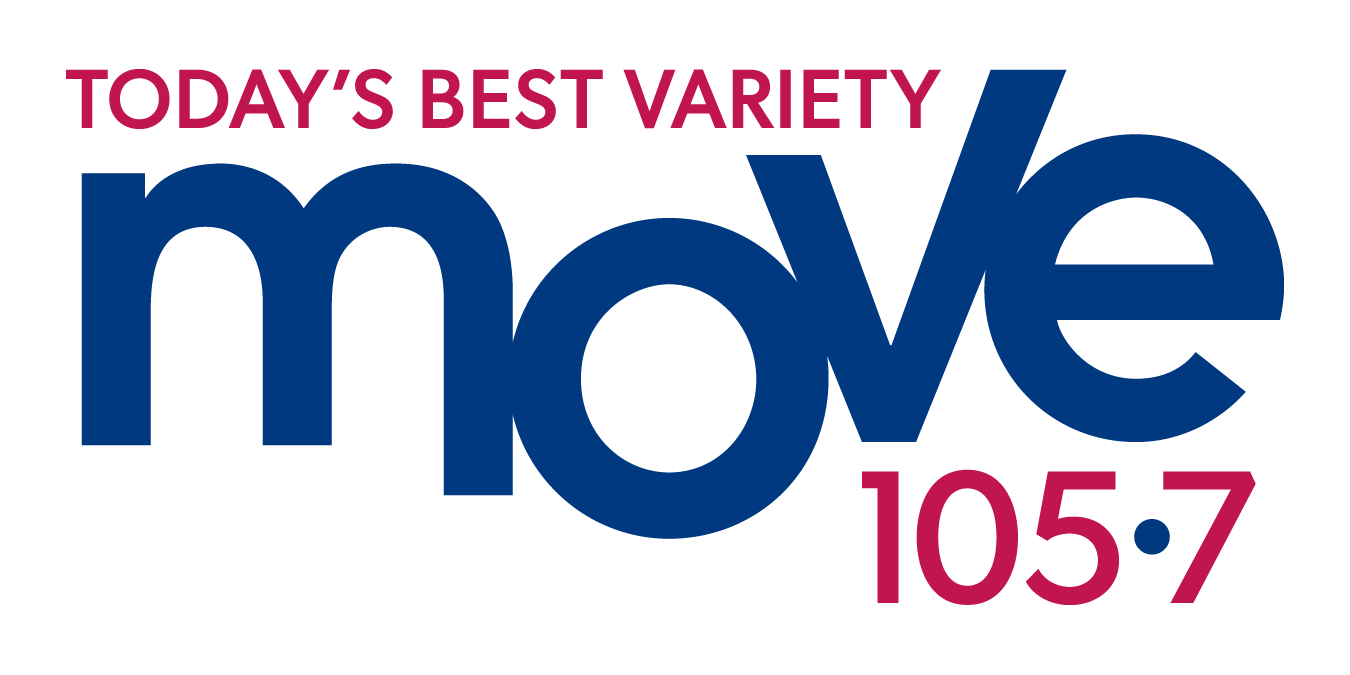
Former "Move Radio" logo until 2025

On February 8, 2024, Bell announced that it would sell four of its stations in Hamilton and St. Catharines to Whiteoaks Communications Group, subject to CRTC approval. The CRTC approved the purchase on December 19, 2024. On June 16, 2025, Whiteoaks rebranded CHRE as "Dream 105.7" while maintaining its AC format.
