= CKTB =

Radio station in St. Catharines

Coordinates: 43°02′12″N 79°09′59″W

- St. Catharines, Ontario; Canada
- Broadcast area: Niagara Region; Greater Toronto and Hamilton Area
- Frequency: 610 kHz
- Branding: CKTB News

Programming
- Format: Talk radio
- Affiliations: The Canadian Press; NPR

Ownership
- Owner: Whiteoaks Communications Group; (Golden Horseshoe Broadcasting Limited)
- Sister stations: CHRE-FM, CHTZ-FM

History
- First air date: 1930
- Former frequencies: 1120 kHz (1930–1933); 1200 kHz (1933–1941); 1230 kHz (1941–1946); 1550 kHz (1946–1950); 620 kHz (1950–1959)
- Call sign meaning: "Taylor & Bate" (original owner)

Technical information
- Licensing authority: CRTC
- Class: B
- Power: 10,000 watts (day); 5,000 watts (night)
- Repeater: 102.9 CKLH-FM HD2 (Hamilton)

Links
- Webcast: Listen live
- Website: cktbnews.com

CKTB (610 AM, "CKTB News") is a radio station licensed to St. Catharines, Ontario, Canada. Owned by Whiteoaks Communications Group, it broadcasts a talk radio format serving the Niagara Region.

Its studios are on Yates Street in downtown St. Catharines, in the former mansion of William Hamilton Merritt, the main promoter of the first Welland Canal. CKTB's transmitter is sited on Grassy Brook Road east of Port Robinson.

== History ==
CKTB signed on the air in 1930. It was founded by Edward T. Sandell, originally at 1120 kilocycles, as a phantom station of CKOC in Hamilton. As with most early AM radio stations (see Canadian allocations changes under NARBA), the station changed frequencies a number of times in its early years, moving to 1200 in 1933, 1230 in 1941, 1550 in 1946, 620 in 1950 and its current 610 in 1959.

In 1936, the station became a founding network affiliate of CBC Radio, as a privately owned station. In 1944, CKTB affiliated with CBC's Dominion Network. The affiliation remained until the Dominion Network was dissolved in 1962. Sandell died in 1943, and the station was acquired by Niagara District Broadcasting the following year.

Niagara District Broadcasting launched an FM sister station in 1949. At first, CKTB-FM largely simulcast its AM counterpart. That station today is CHTZ-FM 97.7 MHz.

The stations were acquired by Standard Broadcasting in 1980. Standard sold CKTB to Affinity Radio Group in 1997. Affinity was in turn acquired by Telemedia in 2000. Standard reacquired the station when it purchased Telemedia in 2002. In October 2007, Astral Media acquired Standard Broadcasting's terrestrial radio and television assets, including CKTB.

Former logo as "NewsTalk 610 CKTB" until 2025

Ownership changed hands again in July 2013 when most of Astral Media's broadcasting properties including CKTB were sold to Bell Media, a subsidiary of Bell Canada Enterprises (BCE).

Former logo as "610 CKTB" until 2026

On February 8, 2024, Bell Media announced the sale of several of its stations to Whiteoaks Communications Group. The CRTC approved the purchase on December 19, 2024. On June 16, 2025, Whiteoaks took ownership of CKTB, the company stated that there would be no major changes to CKTB’s programming; concurrently the station added a new local morning program hosted by veteran Toronto radio personality Gene Valaitis.

== Programming ==
CKTB's programming is a mix of locally-produced and nationally syndicated Canadian talk shows. Weekdays begin with "Niagara in the Morning with Steph Vivier." Gene Valaitis hosts midday from 9 to noon. In afternoon drive time, "The Drive" is heard, with Jon "Gonzo" Mark. Late nights are repeats of weekday shows. Newsroom operations are handled by Bonnie Heslop and Matt Holmes, with additional support from Christine Janzen and Tom McKay. News in off-peak hours comes from the Canadian Press.

Past hosts of locally produced programming include Tim Denis, Joe Cahill, Kevin Jack, Stephanie Sabourin, Rob McConnell, Larry Fedoruk, Chris Biggs, John Michael, Shelby Knox and Tom McConnell. Following Golden Horseshoe's takeover, CFRB 1010 AM Toronto, continued to provide select programming through syndication, including "The Vassy Kapelos Show," and "Shane Hewitt and The Night Shift."

CKTB was the only affiliate in Canada to carry the controversial The Phil Hendrie Show until 2006, when Phil Hendrie retired for the first time. CKTB continued to air the best of Phil Hendrie on Saturdays from 6-10p.m. until April 2007. At that point, the show was replaced with other programming. With Hendrie's return to radio, however, CKTB returned him to the lineup on a daily basis. The show, however, was subsequently dropped and replaced by Dr. Joy Browne, another American show. Browne's program was also subsequently dropped in favour of two-hour-long 'best of' programming blocks, edited from the day's local programming.

While St. Catharines is sometimes considered a part of the Buffalo radio market when dealing with syndicated programming, CKTB does not usually show up in Buffalo's Nielsen Audio ratings. A lack of knowledge of the station, its distance from Buffalo (coupled with its presence on the AM dial), and its primarily Canadian content during the day contribute to this. However, BBM registers CKTB as a popular station in the St. Catharines market, with audience share comparable to that of CHML's audience share in nearby Hamilton.
