= Daily Hive =

Online Canadian newspaper

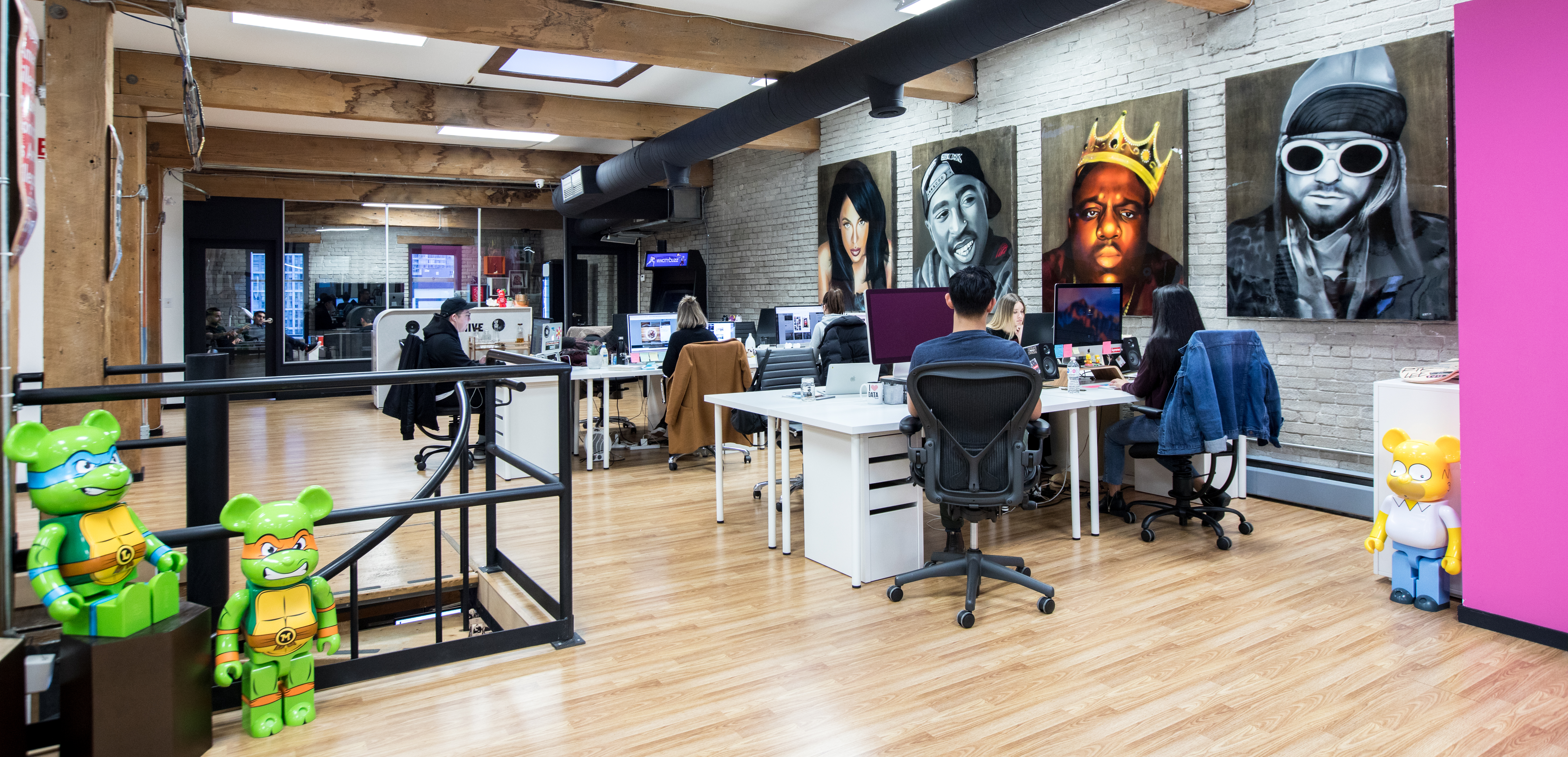
- Head office in downtown Vancouver
- Formerly: Vancity Buzz
- Type: Subsidiary
- Founded: 2008
- Founders: Karm Sumal; Manny Bahia
- Headquarters: Vancouver, British Columbia
- Areas served: Canada: Calgary; Edmonton; Montreal; Ottawa; Toronto; Vancouver; Winnipeg; United States: Austin; Portland; Seattle; Washington, D.C.; International: Barcelona; Beijing; Berlin; Copenhagen; Hong Kong; Johannesburg; Mexico City; Mumbai; Rio de Janeiro
- Brands: Daily Hive, Dished, Urbanized, Grow, Colony Digital, ID Agency, Mapped
- Owner: ZoomerMedia
- Number of employees: 62 (2020)
- Website: dailyhive.com

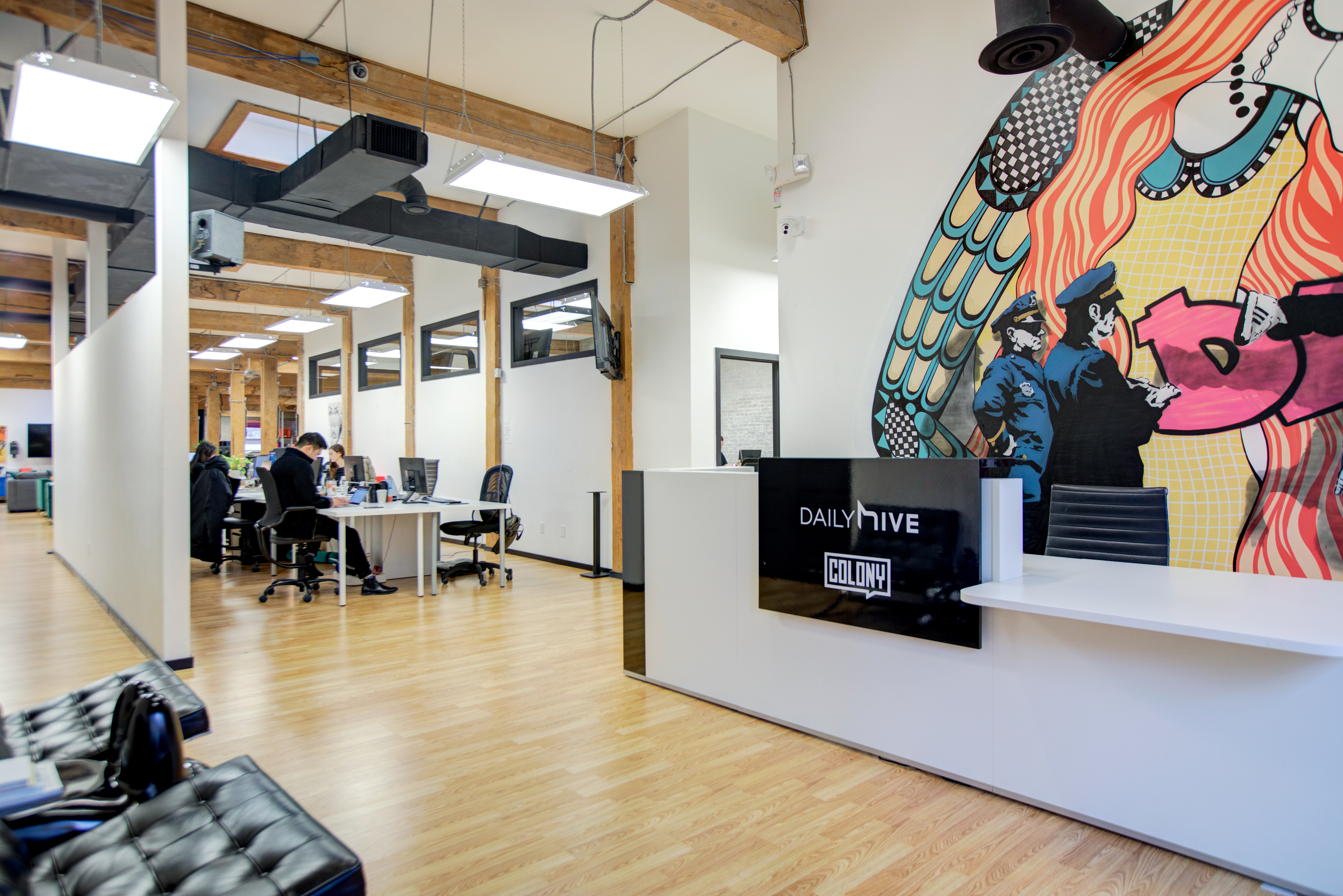
Daily Hive Vancouver offices

Daily Hive, formerly known as Vancity Buzz, is a Canadian online newspaper based in Vancouver, British Columbia. It began digital publishing in 2008 and became Western Canada's largest online-only publication by 2016.

In September 2022, ZoomerMedia announced a deal to acquire Daily Hive for $16.4 million.

== History ==
The site began publishing in 2008 under the name Vancity Buzz and was founded by Manny Bahia and Karm Sumal. Vancity Buzz was the subject of significant criticism, including unethical journalism practices, plagiarism, and fearmongering. In 2016, former Vancouver mayor Gregor Robertson accused Vancity Buzz of starting a media frenzy when the site published photos of three British tourists that were described as suspicious and "Middle Eastern" in an internal Vancouver Police bulletin. Robertson later apologized to the three on behalf of the city.

The site's name was changed to Daily Hive in 2016 when the company expanded nationally to Toronto and Montreal. In November 2017, Daily Hive deleted many of their posts on their official Instagram account as a form of viral marketing, inspired by Taylor Swift's similar publicity stunt earlier in the year. They then posted images of the word "Nude". This stunt caused growth in their social media presence and gained them more followers.

In 2018, former Vancity Buzz contributor Bartosz Bos sued the organization, alleging that he was owed more than $18,000 in back pay for work done in 2013 that was never compensated. Vancity Buzz was ordered by court to pay Bos $1,000 for "coming unprepared for trial" at a 2020 hearing during the suit. In 2018, Daily Hive launched ID Agency, an in-house influencer marketing agency operating out of their Vancouver office, and acquired Colony Digital, a full-service creative agency based in Vancouver.

In February 2019, Daily Hive acquired Torontoist, a long-running web publication that formerly offered similar coverage of Toronto. Originally established in 2004 as part of the Gothamist network of city-specific news websites, Torontoist was a property of St. Joseph Media from 2011 until its acquisition by Daily Hive. It no longer publishes original content as a separate entity from Daily Hive.

In 2019, Daily Hive made their first international expansion into the US market, opening channels in both Seattle and Portland.

== Brands ==
- DH News – News
- Dished – Food
- Urbanized – Real estate, architecture, urban Design, transportation, and urban issues
- Venture – Technology and business
- Offside – Sports
- Listed – Events
- Mapped – Travel
- Colony Digital – Digital marketing agency
- ID Agency – Influencer agency

== See also ==
- List of newspapers in Canada
- List of Canadian newspapers by circulation
