= CFMO-FM =

Radio station in Collingwood, Ontario, Canada

Coordinates: 44°28′41″N 80°19′40″W

Semi-satellite of CFMZ-FM Toronto

Collingwood, Ontario; Canada
- Broadcast area: Simcoe County
- Frequency: 102.9 MHz
- Branding: Classical 102.9

Programming
- Format: Classical music

Ownership
- Owner: ZoomerMedia
- Sister stations: CFMX-FM, CFMZ-FM, CFZM

History
- First air date: August 30, 2014

Technical information
- Class: C1
- ERP: 9,370 watts average 23,000 watts peak
- HAAT: 255 metres (837 ft)

Links
- Webcast: Listen Live
- Website: classicalfm.ca

CFMO-FM (Classical 102.9) is a radio station broadcasting a classical music format on 102.9 MHz FM in Collingwood, Ontario, Canada. The station is owned by ZoomerMedia, through licensee MZ Media Inc. It is largely a semi-satellite of ZoomerMedia's CFMZ-FM 96.3 in Toronto.

== History ==
On February 29, 2012, ZoomerMedia received a licence from the CRTC. In that same decision, a competing application by Evanov Communications for a soft adult contemporary station on 102.9 was denied. The station was originally to operate at 104.9 MHz; however, Bayshore Broadcasting was approved to use the 104.9 frequency in Shelburne, forcing CFMO-FM to find an alternate frequency.

On March 15, 2013, the CRTC approved CFMO-FM's application to operate on 102.9 MHz. The 102.9 MHz frequency for CFMO-FM is first adjacent to CFGI-FM 102.7 MHz in Georgina Island, operated by a local First Nations group, causing potential interference between the two stations. In response to this, ZoomerMedia entered into an agreement with Georgina Island First Nations, in which ZoomerMedia agreed to supply CFGI-FM with new transmitting equipment, refurbish its transmitting antenna and cover the costs related to preparing applications for the CRTC. The relocation of CFGI-FM from 102.7 to its new frequency, 92.3 MHz, was approved by the CRTC on March 15, 2013.

The station launched on August 30, 2014, as Classical 102.9. All music programming is fed from Toronto, though like sister station CFMX-FM in Cobourg, it originates 24 hours per week of local talk and spoken word programming.

== Notes ==
The call letters CFMO and CFMO-FM was originally used by radio station in the Ottawa area which is known as CKKL-FM. The call letters were also used on what is now CKBY-FM.
