= CHTZ-FM =

Radio station in St. Catharines

Coordinates: 43.15392°N 79.24698°W

- St. Catharines, Ontario; Canada
- Broadcast area: Niagara Region
- Frequency: 97.7 MHz
- Branding: 97.7 HTZ-FM

Programming
- Format: Active rock

Ownership
- Owner: Whiteoaks Communications Group; (Golden Horseshoe Broadcasting Limited)
- Sister stations: CKTB, CHRE-FM

History
- First air date: February 1, 1949
- Former call signs: CKTB-FM (1949–1979); CJQR-FM (1979–1986)
- Call sign meaning: Similar to "hits"

Technical information
- Class: B
- ERP: 50,000 watts
- HAAT: 119.5 metres (392 ft)

Links
- Website: htzfm.com

CHTZ-FM (97.7 MHz) is a commercial FM radio station in St. Catharines, Ontario, Canada, serving the Niagara Region. It is owned by Whiteoaks Communications Group and broadcasts an active rock format, branded as 97.7 HTZ-FM (pronounced "Hits FM"). CHTZ shares studios (nicknamed "The White House of Rock") with its sister stations, CKTB and CHRE-FM, in "Oak Hill Mansion", the former home of William Hamilton Merritt, at 12 Yates Street in downtown St. Catharines.

CHTZ-FM has an effective radiated power (ERP) of 50,000 watts. The transmitter is on Cataract Road in Thorold, sharing its tower with CHRE-FM.

== History ==
The station launched on February 1, 1949 as an FM simulcast of the city's CKTB. The station later launched distinct programming, and adopted a country format with the new callsign CJQR-FM on April 30, 1979. Niagara District Broadcasting, the owner of CKTB and CJQR-FM, was acquired by Standard Broadcasting in 1980.

The station subsequently adopted its current callsign and a CHR format on June 27, 1986, which would later morph into its current rock format in 1989. In 1998, the station was sold to Affinity Radio Group. In 2000, Affinity was acquired by Telemedia, which was in turn acquired by Standard in 2002. Standard retained ownership of CHTZ after the reacquisition.

On October 26, 2007, Standard was acquired by Astral Media. The following year, the station segued to active rock from mainstream rock. In June 2013, the CRTC approved the acquisition of Astral by Bell Media.

On June 3, 2016, the station's early afternoon host Jesse Modz attracted national press attention when he pranked a scalper who was reselling tickets to The Tragically Hip's Man Machine Poem Tour. Modz talked the scalper into driving from Mississauga to St. Catharines by offering a $300 premium on top of the asking price; when the scalper arrived, Modz did not purchase the tickets, but rather confronted him about the ethics of scalping.

On February 8, 2024, Bell Media announced that it would sell several of its stations, including CHTZ-FM, to Whiteoaks Communications Group as part of a restructuring. The CRTC approved the sale on December 19, 2024. On June 16, 2025, Whiteoaks took ownership of CHTZ, the company stated that there would be no major changes to CHTZ’s programming.
