= FutuRéale =

Canadian arts, culture and living magazine (2007-13)

FutuRéale was a Canadian arts, culture and living magazine based out of Toronto, Ontario. It focused on Toronto's arts community, while demonstrating cultural expression through the arts, and its influence on urban lifestyles and urban living. FutuRéale is one of the first magazines in North America to be made available on compact disc.

FutuRéale also hosted events for artists in Toronto. The title "FutuRéale" is derived from the French word "Futur" meaning Future and the Latin word "Réale" meaning Real. Together the words mean "Real Future". The magazine published over 60 issues between 2007 and 2013 when it suspended further publication after the parent company began a relocation from Toronto to Vancouver. Archives of the magazine are available on the publisher's website: https://web.archive.org/web/20140922214518/http://onamap.ca/publishing/

FutuRéale Magazine has featured hundreds of local Canadian celebrities and several Hollywood celebrities including Tonya Lee Williams, Emmanuel Vaugier, Sarah Jessica Parker, Scarlett Bruns, Sean Jones, Georgina Reilly, Bruce McDonald, Al Sapienza and many others.

FutuRéale's Web TV series hosted by Liana Rico, Jess Morton, Eddy Ruyter, and Rob Sotoodeh, and was produced by ONAMAP Productions. All episodes were meant for public viewing and are still available.

FutuRéale supported local artists and writers by giving them the spotlight. The work of Dany Pen, Eric Smaltz, Eric Rosenhek, Deliciousnoize, Graeme Mollison, Marnina Hermann, Rusted Pyre and many more.

FutuRéale also featured a number of popular locations in Toronto including Zilberschmuck.

The magazine recently worked with ONAMAP Productions and ONAMAP Education Services to feature Gillian Vivona, author of the Steps to Success Program for non-academic students. Vivona appears in the FutuRéale WebTV series and in numerous publications on education.
