= CJMR =

Radio station in Mississauga

Coordinates: 43°27′29″N 79°45′17″W

- Mississauga, Ontario; Canada
- Broadcast area: Greater Toronto Area

Programming
- Format: Multilingual

Ownership
- Owner: Whiteoaks Communications Group Limited; (Trafalgar Broadcasting)
- Sister stations: CJYE

History
- First air date: 1974
- Former frequencies: 1190 kHz (1974–1990); 1320 kHz (1990–2026)

Links
- Website: cjmrradio.com

CJMR is a Canadian internet radio station, which broadcasts multicultural programming. It formerly broadcast at AM 1320. Although officially licensed to Mississauga, Ontario, it broadcasts from studios in Oakville. CJMR's studios are located on Church Street in downtown Oakville, while its transmitters were located along Dundas Street West near Third Line Road on the northwest side of Oakville.

Originally a daytimer on AM 1190, CJMR was launched in 1974, by CHWO Radio Limited (now Whiteoaks Communications Group), the owners of CHWO. On January 18, 1990, at 5 p.m. the station moved to its current frequency (vacated by CFGM) and began a 24-hour broadcast schedule. Formerly a mixture of multilingual and Christian programming, CJMR moved to exclusively multilingual programming in 2001, when the religious programming moved to the new CJYE.

In 1986, the station was denied a licence to move to the FM dial. CJMR and CHMB are the only stations in Canada which broadcast on 1320 AM.

Logo as "CJMR 1320" used until 2026

CJMR's programming is mainly South Asian (Hindi and Punjabi) with some Cantonese, Croatian, Dutch, Filipino, Gujarati, Italian, Mandarin, Polish, Portuguese, Romanian, Spanish, Ukrainian and Urdu programming in the evenings and on weekends.

In January 2026, CJMR and sister station CJYE ceased broadcasting on the AM band after announcing they would only be available digitally.

Around August 17, 2026, CJMR returned to the air at 1320 AM.
