= CFZM =

Radio station in Toronto, Ontario, Canada

- Toronto, Ontario; Canada
- Broadcast area: Greater Toronto Area; Southern Ontario
- Frequency: 740 kHz (AM)
- Branding: Zoomer Radio

Programming
- Language: English
- Format: Adult standards; oldies

Ownership
- Owner: ZoomerMedia; (MZ Media Incorporated)
- Sister stations: CFMO-FM; CFMX-FM; CFMZ-FM

History
- First air date: November 17, 1956
- Former call signs: CHWO (1956–2008)
- Former frequencies: 1250 kHz (1956–2001)
- Call sign meaning: Zoomer Media (owner) or Znaimer, Moses (owner)

Technical information
- Licensing authority: CRTC
- Class: A (Clear-channel)
- Power: 50,000 watts
- Transmitter coordinates: 43°34′30″N 79°49′2″W
- Repeaters: 96.7 CFZM-1-FM (Toronto); 96.3 CFMZ-HD2 (Toronto)

Links
- Webcast: Listen live
- Website: www.zoomerradio.ca

CFZM (740 kHz) is a commercial Canadian AM radio station in Toronto, Ontario. It is owned by ZoomerMedia, headed by Canadian broadcaster Moses Znaimer. It airs an adult standards and oldies format, branded as Zoomer Radio, with the slogan "The Original Greatest Hits". The studios and offices are on Jefferson Avenue in the Liberty Village neighbourhood.

CFZM is a Class A, clear channel station. It transmits with a power of 50,000 watts, the maximum for Canadian AM stations. It uses a non-directional antenna, with its transmitter on Auburn Road in Milton, near Highway 401. Programming is also heard on a low power FM repeater in downtown Toronto on 96.7 MHz.

Due to its transmitter power and Southern Ontario's flat land, CFZM has an unusually large daytime coverage area, equivalent to that of a full-power FM station. Its city-grade signal covers all of Southern Ontario, much of upstate New York (including Buffalo, Rochester and Watertown), northwestern Pennsylvania (including Erie), and slivers of Michigan and Ohio. Its grade B signal reaches as far east as Utica, New York, as far south as Pittsburgh and as far west as Lansing, Michigan. At night, with a good radio, it can be heard around most of the eastern half of North America, including three-fourths of Canada.

== History ==
=== CHWO 1250 ===
The station was originally launched in 1956 on 1250 AM in Oakville, with the call sign CHWO. Its licence was held by what is now known as Whiteoaks Communications Group, a company owned by broadcaster Howard Caine and a number of minority investors. In 1967, shortly before Caine's death, his wife Jean was appointed to the board of directors and took over the station's management. In 1974, CHWO added a sister station, CJMR in Mississauga which was not included in the 2008 sale of CHWO.

=== Move to 740 AM ===
AM 740 Prime time Radio logo

In 2000, the Canadian Broadcasting Corporation's CBL gave up its longtime home on 740 and moved to FM. CBL had been plagued by radio frequency interference that made it hard to listen in downtown Toronto. Despite this shortfall, the prized clear channel frequency became hotly contested by new and existing stations in the area. CHWO applied for the frequency, citing that it could provide a stronger service to the region's older adult population. Concurrently, the Caine family also applied for a new station on the old 1250 frequency, to air a Christian music format.

The applications were granted, and CHWO moved to the 740 frequency on 8 January 2001, leasing CBL's former transmitter in Hornby from the CBC. CHWO originally applied for the new call sign CFPT, but when this was denied by Industry Canada because the call sign was already in use, the station chose to retain its heritage "CHWO" calls. CHWO's replacement at 1250, CJYE, launched on 5 February.

=== Sale to Moses Znaimer ===
On 18 September 2007, Prime Time Radio announced a deal to sell the station to Moses Znaimer. AM 740 would become a sister station to Toronto's classical music station, CFMZ. The deal was approved by the Canadian Radio-television and Telecommunications Commission (CRTC) on 31 March 2008. Znaimer moved the station's studios and city of licence to Toronto, and changed the station's call sign to CFZM on 22 July 2008. The station began a format of Adult Standards and Oldies, although over time, the number of standards played on the station was reduced.

The station was originally owned by Znaimer's privately held MZ Media Inc. As part of a reorganization of Znaimer's media assets, the station was transferred to the publicly traded ZoomerMedia in 2010.

=== FM rebroadcaster ===
In 2012, Zoomer Media was one of 27 applicants for an FM station at 88.1 MHz, for the purpose of simulcasting CFZM in the city of Toronto, where the AM signal is often difficult to hear. The bid was unsuccessful and the CRTC awarded the frequency to CIND-FM.

On 27 April 2015, MZ Media received CRTC approval to operate a nested FM transmitter in downtown Toronto to rebroadcast CFZM at 96.7 MHz with an average effective radiated power (ERP) of 22.4 watts (maximum 82 watts) with a height above average terrain (HAAT) of 280.1 metres (919 ft). The transmitter is atop First Canadian Place. The repeater, CFZM-1-FM, enables CFZM 740 to overcome the deficiencies of the AM signal in the downtown core. That was the same problems that led CBL to leave the AM band 15 years earlier. The repeater, however, is a first-adjacent signal to CKHC-FM 96.9, a college radio station at Humber College that serves an area in the northwestern part of the city. CFZM-1-FM also faces co-channel interference with CHYM in Kitchener and CJWV in Peterborough. The repeater went on the air that July.
