= CFMX-FM =

Radio station in Cobourg, Ontario, Canada

Semi-satellite of CFMZ-FM Toronto
- Cobourg, Ontario; Canada
- Broadcast area: Cobourg, Peterborough
- Frequency: 103.1 MHz
- Branding: Classical 103.1

Programming
- Format: Classical music

Ownership
- Owner: ZoomerMedia; (MZ Media Inc.)
- Sister stations: CFMO-FM, CFMZ-FM, CFZM

History
- First air date: 1979

Technical information
- Licensing authority: CRTC
- Class: C1
- ERP: 86,700 watts
- HAAT: 252 metres (827 ft)
- Transmitter coordinates: 44°4′14.16″N 78°8′35.16″W

Links
- Website: classicalfm.ca

CFMX-FM (103.1 MHz) is a commercial radio station in Cobourg, Ontario, and serving the Peterborough area. It is owned by ZoomerMedia and airs a classical music format branded as Classical 103.1. It is a semi-satellite of Toronto's 96.3 CFMZ-FM. All music programming originates from Toronto, although 24 hours per week of locally oriented talk, news and spoken word programming broadcasts from radio studios in Cobourg. During the simulcast music shows, CFMX-FM inserts local commercials.

CFMX-FM has an effective radiated power (ERP) of 86,700 watts. The transmitter is on Alnwick Hills Road in Baltimore.

== History ==
=== Early years ===
CFMX-FM was launched in 1979 by D. B. Williamson, who also owned Cobourg's CHUC 1450 AM. The station was plagued with financial and technical problems in its early years, and in 1981 its license was briefly suspended by the Canadian Radio-television and Telecommunications Commission (CRTC). Williamson's company went into receivership in 1983, and the station was acquired by businessman Martin Rosenthal.

In 1988, the station added a repeater in Mississauga on 96.3 FM, to serve Toronto-area listeners. The 96.3 transmitter moved into Toronto in 1993. The station's operations eventually became centralized in Toronto by 1997, with a small sales office remaining in Cobourg. For all intents and purposes, the Toronto rebroadcaster was now the primary station.

=== Change in Ownership ===
In September 2006, Canadian broadcaster Moses Znaimer purchased the station. Znaimer changed the call sign to CFMZ to reflect his initials.

Toronto station CKFM-FM briefly attempted to change its call sign to CFMX (reflecting its branding as Mix 99.9) after Znaimer adopted the CFMZ call sign, but was forced to revert to CKFM-FM because the Toronto transmitter had kept its original CFMX-FM-1 call sign.

In September 2007, Znaimer also announced a deal to acquire CHWO 740 AM, an adult standards and oldies station in Oakville. It is now known as CFZM.

=== Return to CFMX-FM ===
In 2008, the CRTC approved a license change that resulted in the Toronto rebroadcaster being upgraded to a full-fledged station. As part of the change, the CFMZ call sign moved to Toronto, while the Cobourg station reclaimed the original CFMX call letters.

The station was originally owned by Znaimer's privately held MZ Media Inc., but as part of a reorganization of Znaimer's media assets, the station was transferred to the publicly traded ZoomerMedia in 2010.
