= Moses Znaimer =

Canadian media executive

- Мовсес Денид Знамиер
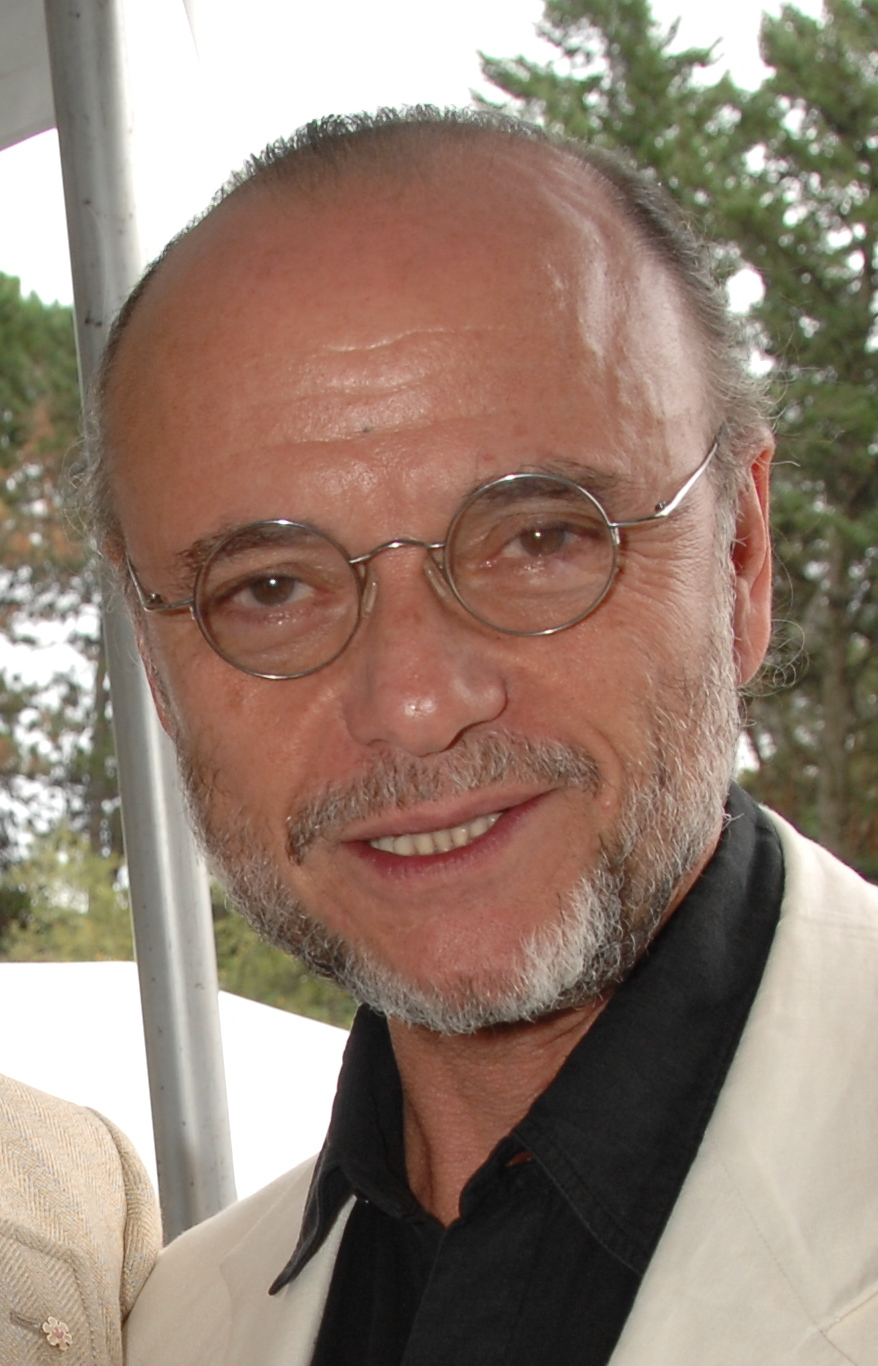
- Znaimer in 2007
- Born: 1942 (age 83–84); Kulob, Tajikistan, Soviet Union
- Education: BA (McGill University), M.A.(Harvard University, 1965)
- Title: President of ZoomerMedia
- Parents: Aron Znaimer (father); Chaya Znaimer (mother)
- Website: mosesznaimer.com

Moses Znaimer OOnt (Russian: Мовсес Денид Знаймер; born 1942) is a Canadian media executive. He is the co-founder and former head of Citytv, the first independent television station in Toronto, Ontario, Canada, and the current head of ZoomerMedia.

== Early life and education ==
Znaimer was born to Jewish parents (Aron Znaimer and Chaya Znaimer (Note: The surname Znaimer literally means "<a person=''> from Znaim", i.e., Znojmo.) née Epelsweig) from Latvia and Poland, who had fled the Nazi invasion of the Soviet Union and relocated to Kulob in the Soviet republic of Tajikistan. Following the war, his family lived in a displaced persons camp in Germany, arriving in Halifax before ultimately ending up in Montreal in 1948 where they settled in a third-floor flat on Montréal’s storied Saint Urbain Street.

In his youth, Znaimer attended United Talmud Torah and then Herzliah High School in the United Talmud Torahs of Montreal private school system, where he developed a reputation for the quality of his voice while performing Friday services. He has remarked that the young women flocking to hear him sing the prayers gave him a taste of what it is like to have groupies.

He graduated from McGill University in Montreal with a B.A. in philosophy and politics, and from Harvard University with an M.A. in government in the mid-1960s.

== CBC ==
Znaimer's career in broadcasting began when he joined the Canadian Broadcasting Corporation (CBC) in the mid-1960s in Montreal and Ottawa. He became well known for his work as host of CBC Radio's Cross Country Checkup, as well as co-host of CBC Television's Take 30 with Adrienne Clarkson. After being denied the opportunity to pursue his creative vision at the CBC, Znaimer quit and went into private broadcasting.

== Citytv ==
With all of the VHF television licences in Toronto taken, Znaimer and a partnership applied for and were awarded the city's first UHF commercial broadcasting licence. Citytv launched in 1972.

With Citytv, he gradually began to pioneer a distinctive style of broadcasting, inspired in part by Marshall McLuhan, which emphasized a strongly local, hip and casual format aimed at young audiences.

In 1981, Toronto-based media conglomerate CHUM Limited purchased Citytv, and Znaimer became vice-president of CHUM and executive producer for all of City's programming. By 1984 Znaimer's vision of a 24-hour music video station was realized with the creation of MuchMusic. MusiquePlus, a joint venture based in Montreal and catering to the French-speaking audiences of Canada, was launched in 1986. In 1987 CHUM-City purchased a former publishing building in Toronto's downtown west end and renovated it into the CHUM-City Building, a landmark media centre.

Throughout the 1990s, Znaimer presided over a considerable expansion of the CHUM-City television empire. Bravo! was launched as a new style arts channel in 1995, and Space in 1997. He continued his original vision for television with the launching of Canada's first 24-hour local news station, CablePulse 24 in 1998. Further cable channels included Canadian Learning Television, Star!, Drive-In Classics, FashionTelevisionChannel, BookTelevision, CourtTV Canada, SexTV: The Channel, MuchLOUD and MuchVibe. Znaimer also oversaw the launch of Citytv Vancouver.

Znaimer left Citytv and CHUM Limited in April 2003, but stayed on in certain production roles. He co-founded and for a time served as chairman of Cannasat Therapeutics, a publicly traded company pioneering a new class of drugs from marijuana; he continues as a shareholder and advisor to the company.

Ultimately, CHUM Limited was acquired in 2007 by CTVglobemedia and the Citytv stations (including CITY and CKVU) are now owned by Rogers Media.

== ZoomerMedia ==
In 2006, Moses Znaimer filed an application with the CRTC to acquire CFMX-FM, a commercial classical music radio station licensed to Cobourg with a rebroadcaster in Toronto. In 2008 he gained CRTC approval to relaunch the Toronto rebroadcaster as a full-fledged station, using the call sign CFMZ-FM to reflect his initials. In September 2007, he announced a deal to acquire CHWO, a pop standards AM station in Toronto. The station had operated from the former transmitter of CBC Radio outlet CBL, allowing it to blanket most of the eastern half of North America at night and much of the Great Lakes region and northern United States during the day. Znaimer officially took control of the station in 2008 and rechristened it CFZM. In addition to pop standards, it also offers news and some public-service talk programming, primarily aimed at the Toronto and southern Ontario market region, as well as a weeknight hour devoted to rebroadcasting classic radio dramatic and dramatic shows, usually programs first produced for the U.S. networks between the late 1930s and the late 1950s.

He also announced a subsequent deal to acquire web developer Fifty-Plus Net International, with the intention of launching a social networking website similar to MySpace or Facebook but aimed at older adults.

In 2008, Znaimer officially incorporated ZoomerMedia to operate his new media holdings. In June 2009, the company announced a deal to acquire the media assets of S-VOX, which operated several channels of religiously-oriented television programming, for $25 million.

== Personal life ==
In 2005, Znaimer received a Governor General's Performing Arts Award for Lifetime Artistic Achievement, Canada's highest honour in the performing arts, for his lifetime contributions to broadcasting. In 2006, he was made a member of the Order of Ontario.

Moses has been in a relationship with Marilyn Lightstone since they met at McGill University in the early 1960s. They never had children.

A collector of vintage television sets, including the set David Sarnoff presented at the 1939 World's Fair, Znaimer's MZTV Museum of Television is located at The ZoomerPlex (ZoomerMedia building), in the Liberty Village area of Toronto.
