= Joy Radio =

Radio station in Oakville, Ontario

Coordinates: 43°27′29″N 79°45′17″W

- Oakville, Ontario; Canada
- Broadcast area: Greater Toronto Area
- Branding: Joy Radio

Programming
- Format: Christian

Ownership
- Owner: Whiteoaks Communications Group Limited (Trafalgar Broadcasting)
- Sister stations: CJMR

History
- First air date: February 5, 2001
- Former call signs: CJYE (2001–2026)
- Former frequencies: 1250 kHz AM (2001–2026)

Links
- Website: joyradio.ca

Joy Radio is a Canadian Internet radio station. It formerly broadcast on 1250 AM in Oakville, Ontario using the call sign CJYE. The station airs a Christian music and talk format branded as Joy Radio. Its studios are located on Church Street in downtown Oakville, while its transmitters were located along Dundas Street West near Third Line Road on the northwest side of Oakville.

CJYE launched on February 5, 2001, adopting the frequency formerly held by its sister station CHWO. Its religious programming formerly aired on sister station CJMR, which also aired multilingual programming. With the launch of CJYE, CJMR moved to a full-time multilingual format.

In January 2026, CJYE and sister station CJMR ceased broadcasting on the AM band after and announcing they would only be available digitally.
