= CJRK-FM =

Multilingual radio station in Scarborough, Ontario

Coordinates: 43°48′41.04″N 79°13′33.96″W

- Scarborough, Ontario; Canada
- Broadcast area: Greater Toronto Area
- Frequency: 102.7 MHz
- Branding: East FM 102.7

Programming
- Language: Multilingual

Ownership
- Owner: East FM 102.7; (8041393 Canada Inc.)

History
- First air date: September 1, 2016

Technical information
- Licensing authority: CRTC
- ERP: 472 watts (average); 1,200 watts (peak)
- HAAT: 72.6 metres (238 ft)

Links
- Website: eastfm.ca

CJRK-FM (102.7 MHz) is a radio station which broadcasts a multilingual format licensed to Scarborough, Ontario, and serving the Greater Toronto Area district. The station is owned by East FM, through licensee 8041393 Canada Inc., which received approval to operate this FM radio station on November 5, 2014. The station launched on September 1, 2016.

The station's programming targets teenagers and young adults in south, east and west-Asian communities in Scarborough and the Durham Region communities of Ajax and Pickering, and serves approximately 18 ethnic groups in a minimum of nine different languages.
