= ZoomerMedia =

Canadian media company

ZoomerMedia Limited
- Type: Public
- Traded as: TSX-V: ZUM
- Industry: Media
- Founded: Toronto, Ontario (2007)
- Founder: Moses Znaimer
- Headquarters: Toronto, Ontario
- Products: Broadcasting, advertising, publishing, television production
- Website: zoomermedia.ca

ZoomerMedia Limited is a Canadian media company. Founded by veteran media executive Moses Znaimer, the company has interests in radio, television, and digital media.

The company focuses primarily on lifestyle properties appealing to adults 45–65 (including baby boomers), being formed from Znaimer's acquisition of publishing and digital assets affiliated with CARP. The company later acquired the broadcasting assets of S-VOX (including specialty channel VisionTV), and subsumed other privately held assets that had been owned by Znaimer directly (including three Toronto radio stations). In the 2020s, it began to expand into digital properties targeting a young adult audience, including blogTO, Daily Hive, The Peak, MobileSyrup, Dished and Offside.

== History ==
ZoomerMedia was announced in February 2008 by Moses Znaimer—a veteran Canadian media executive that had recently been named the executive director of CARP—via his acquisitions of Kemur Publishing and Fifty-Plus.Net International. The two companies had originally been established by CARP's founders Lillian and Murray Morgenthau to house for-profit publishing and internet businesses that could not fall directly under the non-profit association; they provided revenue to CARP via royalties and other business agreements with the organization. Znaimer acquired the companies for $13.1 million in a reverse takeover, going public on the TSX Venture Exchange in July of that year.

The name of the company is derived from "zoomer", a term coined in 2000 by Znaimer for baby boomers "with zip" who wanted to live actively after retirement; as such, its operations would consist of businesses that target people between the ages of 45 and 65. ZoomerMedia would maintain its affiliations with CARP, with plans announced for its magazine to be relaunched as Zoomer Magazine under new publisher Suzanne Boyd, and the company expanding the "Zoomer" brand into other ventures targeting the demographic, such as the social networking service Zoomer.com, and the ZoomerShow expo in Toronto

In June 2009, ZoomerMedia announced a deal to acquire the broadcasting assets of S-VOX, which included conventional stations CHNU-TV and CIIT-TV, along with specialty channels VisionTV and a stake in One for $25 million. Alongside the acquisition of S-VOX, ZoomerMedia also planned to subsume MZ Media—a private company held by Znaimer that owned the Toronto radio stations CFMZ-FM, CFMX-FM, and CFZM. Following the transactions (which required the approval of minority shareholders and the Canadian Radio-television and Telecommunications Commission (CRTC), Znaimer owns 66% of the combined company, and insurance company Fairfax Financial owns 28%. All of these transactions were completed on June 30, 2010.

Later, on September 28, 2010, ZoomerMedia relocated its headquarters to 64 Jefferson Avenue.

In 2022, ZoomerMedia began to acquire young adult-oriented digital properties, acquiring the publisher of blogTO in February 2022, and the publisher of Daily Hive in September 2022. Chief digital officer Omri Tintpulver explained that despite being positioned towards young adults, blogTO still had a sizable reach among ZoomerMedia's core demographic market, and that the site would also allow it to reach wider demographics, pursue "integrated" multi-platform advertising opportunities, and leverage its experience in developing digital and social media content.

On February 8, 2024, Bell Media announced that it would sell its Owen Sound radio station CJOS-FM to ZoomerMedia. In June 2024, Blue Ant Media sold the mobile and technology news website MobileSyrup to ZoomerMedia.

== Assets ==
=== Conventional television stations ===
ZoomerMedia's two conventional stations were part of a television system known as Joytv until August 2013 when CIIT was rebranded as "Hope TV" and dropped all non-religious programming. As Joytv, they were licensed as religious television stations that air religious-based programs in addition to other family friendly and entertainment programs. Both were previously owned by S-VOX. They had previously been a part of the Omni Television system, having been previously owned by Trinity Television before the sale to Rogers. Rogers sold the two stations to S-VOX on March 31, 2008.

- CHNU-DT, Vancouver, British Columbia (Joytv)
- CIIT-DT, Winnipeg, Manitoba (FaithTV)

=== Specialty channels ===
- VisionTV (Canada) and ZoomerTV (United States)
- One (Canada) and ONETV US (United States)

=== Radio ===
- CFMZ-FM, Toronto, Ontario (The New Classical 96.3 FM)
- CFZM, Toronto, Ontario (Zoomer Radio)
- CFMX-FM, Cobourg, Ontario (Classical 103.1)
- CFMO-FM, Collingwood, Ontario (Classical 102.9)
- CJOS-FM, Owen Sound, Ontario (Zoomer 92.3)

=== Magazines ===
- On the Bay
- Tonic
- Zoomer Magazine

=== Digital ===
- EverythingZoomer.com
- dailyhive.com
- blogto.com
- Dished
- Offside
- The Peak
- mobilesyrup.com
- Ludwig-Van.com

=== Other assets ===
- MZTV Museum of Television
- MZTV Production & Distribution
- ideaCity (Conference)
- Marketing / membership operations of CARP
- VoxBox
- Zoomer Management Limited
- ZoomerCard
- ZoomerShow

== See also ==
- CHUM Limited – Moses Znaimer managed its television division from 1981 to 2003.
