= CFMZ-FM =

Radio station in Toronto, Ontario, Canada

- Toronto, Ontario; Canada
- Broadcast area: Greater Toronto Area
- Frequency: 96.3 MHz (HD Radio)
- Branding: The New Classical 96.3 FM

Programming
- Format: Classical music
- Subchannels: HD2: CFZM

Ownership
- Owner: ZoomerMedia; (MZ Media Inc.)
- Sister stations: CFMO-FM, CFMX-FM, CFZM

History
- First air date: 1988
- Former call signs: CFMX-FM-1 (1988–2008)
- Call sign meaning: CF Moses Znaimer

Technical information
- Licensing authority: CRTC
- Class: C1
- ERP: 26,200 watts (average); 60,000 watts (peak)
- HAAT: 283.6 metres (930 ft)
- Transmitter coordinates: 43.65747°N 79.35692°W

Links
- Webcast: Listen live
- Website: classicalfm.ca

CFMZ-FM (The New Classical 96.3 FM) is an FM radio station that is licensed to Toronto, Ontario, Canada. Broadcasting on 96.3 MHz, the station is owned by ZoomerMedia and airs a classical music radio format. CFMZ's studios are located on Jefferson Avenue in Liberty Village, while its transmitter is located atop First Canadian Place in downtown Toronto.

CFMZ-FM, along with its sister stations, CFMX-FM in Cobourg and CFMO-FM in Collingwood, are among only five commercial broadcasters in Canada with a purely classical music format. CFMZ-FM and its sister stations are the only one that broadcasts in English. CJPX-FM Montreal and CJSQ-FM Quebec City broadcast in French.

As of 2018, CFMZ-FM was the third most listened-to private station in Toronto, behind adult Contemporary CHFI-FM and classic hits CHBM-FM.

== History ==
Cobourg radio station CFMX-FM has been broadcasting since 1982, although it had gone on the air and off again, several times, between 1976 and 1982. CFMZ first signed on in 1988 as a rebroadcaster of CFMX, with the call sign CFMX-FM-1. The station was, at first, licensed to Mississauga, the original transmitter location. The transmitter was moved to Toronto in 1993. CFMX's operations were gradually centralized in Toronto by 1997, and for all intents and purposes the Toronto rebroadcaster was now the primary signal.

In September 2006, Canadian broadcaster Moses Znaimer purchased the station. The CFMZ call sign was originally assigned to the Cobourg transmitter. However, according to Industry Canada databases, the Toronto rebroadcaster kept its original CFMX-FM-1 call sign.

In September 2007, Znaimer also announced a deal to acquire CHWO, a pop standards station in Oakville.

In 2008, the CRTC approved a change that upgraded the Toronto rebroadcaster to a full-fledged station under the call sign CFMZ, while the Cobourg station reclaimed the original CFMX calls. All music programming originates from Toronto, although the Cobourg station has some local programming.

CFMZ was originally owned by Znaimer's privately held MZ Media Inc. As part of a reorganization of Znaimer's media assets, the station was transferred to the publicly traded ZoomerMedia in 2010.
