= CFMS-FM =

Radio station in Markham, Ontario, Canada

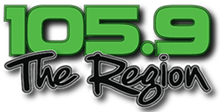
- Markham, Ontario; Canada
- Broadcast area: York Region
- Frequency: 105.9 MHz (HD Radio)
- Branding: 105.9 The Region

Programming
- Format: Adult contemporary and ethnic
- Subchannels: HD2: Chinese pop; HD3: Farsi; HD4: South Asian

Ownership
- Owner: Bhupinder Bola

History
- First air date: February 5, 2014

Technical information
- Licensing authority: CRTC
- Class: A
- ERP: 1,600 watts
- HAAT: 21.1 metres (69 ft)
- Transmitter coordinates: 43.855388°N 79.338126°W

Links
- Website: 1059theregion.com

CFMS-FM (105.9 FM) is a radio station licensed to Markham, Ontario, Canada. The station broadcasts a mixed format, with daytime programming featuring English-language adult contemporary music along with news, weather and traffic information targeted to York Region, and evening programming featuring a multilingual ethnic format in multiple languages, including Cantonese, Filipino, Hindi, Mandarin, Punjabi, Tamil and Urdu.

== History ==
On September 11, 2012, the Canadian Radio-television and Telecommunications Commission (CRTC) approved Bhupinder Bola's application to operate a new FM commercial FM radio programming undertaking in Markham. The station has their main office located in Vaughan, Ontario.

The station officially launched on February 5, 2014. The station has also expressed interest in testing HD Radio for the purposes of offering time shifting for its listeners, in case they missed earlier programming.

On April 23, 2015, the CRTC denied an application by Radio Markham York Incorporated to add a new transmitter in Aurora to operate at 91.7 MHz channel 219A) with an average effective radiated power (ERP) of 45 watts (maximum ERP of 150 watts with an effective height of antenna above average terrain of 179.5 metres). On June 8, 2023, the CRTC denied an application by Radio Markham York Incorporated to add a new FM transmitter at 91.7 MHz in Pickering, Ontario.

Previously the registration for CFMS was for an easy listening station on 98.5 MHz located in Victoria, British Columbia, now known as CIOC-FM.
