= McLaughlin Planetarium =

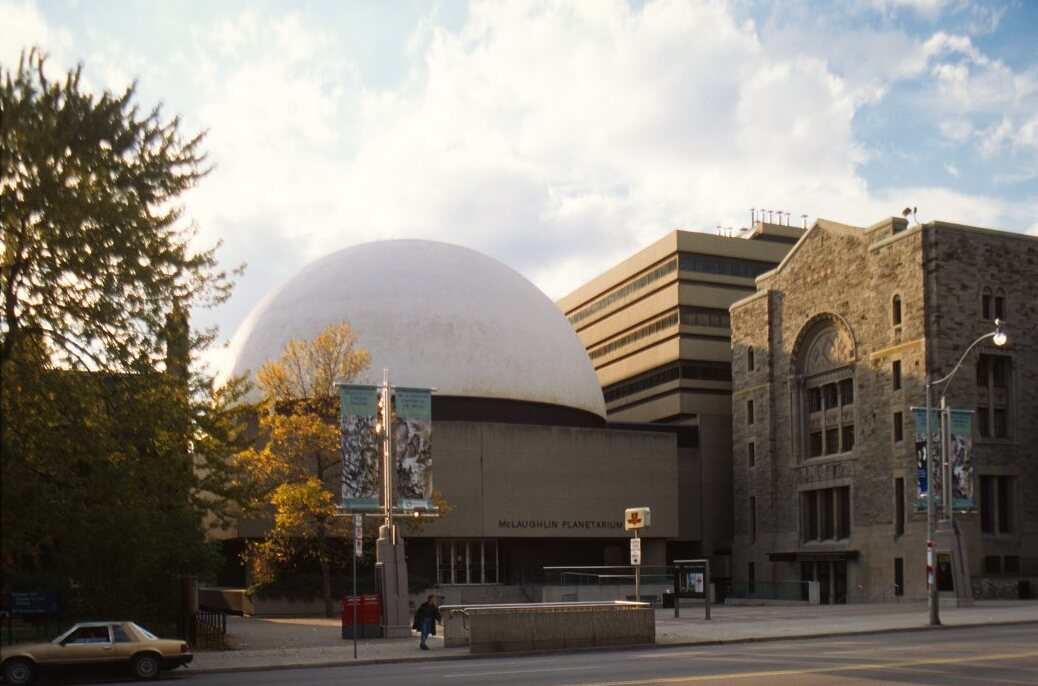
- The McLaughlin Planetarium in 1993
- Established: 1968
- Dissolved: 1995
- Location: 100 Queen's Park Toronto, Ontario, Canada
- Coordinates: 43.666964°N 79.394181°W
- Type: Planetarium museum
- Public transit access: Museum

The McLaughlin Planetarium was a planetarium whose building occupied a space immediately to the south of the Royal Ontario Museum in Toronto, at 100 Queen's Park. Founded by a grant from philanthropist Colonel R. Samuel McLaughlin, the facility was opened to the public on October 26, 1968. It had, for its time, a state-of-the-art electro-mechanical Zeiss planetarium projector that was used to project regular themed shows about the stars, planets, and cosmology for visitors. By the 1980s the planetarium's sound-system and domed ceiling were used to display dazzling music-themed laser-light shows. The lower levels of the planetarium contained a gallery called the "Astrocentre" that featured space-related exhibits, related artifacts on the history of astronomy and was also home of the world's first commercial Stellarium.

Starting in 1978, there was a decline in attendance that lasted for four years while major construction was being undertaken at its sibling institution, the adjacent Royal Ontario Museum. This work also entailed the demolition of part of the planetarium's facilities. Though attendance picked up when the museum reopened in 1984, the planetarium was forced to close on November 5, 1995, after provincial budget cuts to the museum. The planetarium's exhibits, artifacts and theatre facilities were subsequently dismantled and dispersed. For a brief period it housed the Children's Own Museum. It was later used solely for offices and as a storage facility for the museum.

Early in 2009, the R.O.M. announced that it had sold the building and site to the University of Toronto, which planned to demolish the existing building to make way for additional facilities. In September 2014, the university announced preliminary plans for new facilities to be built on the site. Demolition began in April 2026.

== Beginnings ==
Proposals for building a planetarium in Toronto date back to 1944, but serious planning only started in 1962, thanks to a bequest made by a former member of the Royal Astronomical Society of Canada (RASC). In May 1964 the chairman and the President of the University of Toronto gave their support for the idea to the RASC, and suggested a site near the existing Royal Ontario Museum, adding that significant financial support would have to come from outside the university to make it possible.

In November 1964 Canadian businessman Colonel Samuel McLaughlin announced plans for donating money directly towards establishing a planetarium in Toronto. He was inspired by the recent construction of the Hayden Planetarium in New York City, named after Charles Hayden, who had been a friend and associate on the board of International Nickel. McLaughlin donated $2 million for the building's construction, and gave an additional $1.15 million as an ongoing endowment. The University of Toronto, which owned and operated the Royal Ontario Museum prior to becoming a separate, provincially funded body, donated land adjacent to the museum. The building was constructed in an area that had formerly been a park belonging to the museum, and also required the demolition of a mansion at 86 Queens Park that had been the residence for the President of the University of Toronto.

The building was designed by architects Allward and Gouinlock and by the engineering firm Stone and Webster Canada, Ltd. in 1965. Colonel McLaughlin unveiled a model of the building at his 94th birthday celebration, which was held in his honour at the museum in September of that year. It was hoped that the building would be open by Canada's centennial in 1967, but construction delays forced the opening to October 26, 1968.

In addition to what was built, the original plans also called for a multi-story parking garage, a 550-seat conventional movie theatre, and a direct underground link to the Museum subway stop. These features were deemed too costly and were never built.

The building contained four floors:

- a basement containing a lecture hall that hosted meetings of the Toronto branch of the Royal Astronomical Society of Canada, as well as some general storage rooms;
- a ground floor that featured a small store selling space-themed merchandise, a small library, coat-check room, a prominent bronze bust of Colonel McLaughlin, and the box office and staff lounge (not accessible to the public);
- a second floor, called the "Astrocentre", which featured various astronomical exhibits and a line to the adjacent R.O.M; and
- a third floor, called "The Theatre of the Stars", was devoted wholly to astronomical shows, and featured a Zeiss planetarium projector along with 85 slide and video projectors used to recreate starry skies, along with two back rooms that housed computers, cooling systems, and audio/visual controllers. The public theatre could seat 340 people at a time, and contained a sound system of approximately 25,000 watts.

== The building ==
The dominant feature of the building was the dome, which rose 25.3 meters (83 ft) from the ground, and had an outer diameter of 27.7 meters (91 ft). The dome structure was layered, with an outer waterproofed casing of reinforced concrete 4 centimeters (2.5 inches) thick, and an inner concrete dome that was insulated by a layer of urethane foam.

The projection dome was separate from the outer dome, and was 23 meters (75.4 ft) in diameter. Made of curved aluminum sheets, it was lap jointed to create a continuous spherical surface. The sheets were painted white and perforated with 2.5-millimeter (0.1 inch) holes, which were designed to let sound through and reduced echoes in the cavernous space.

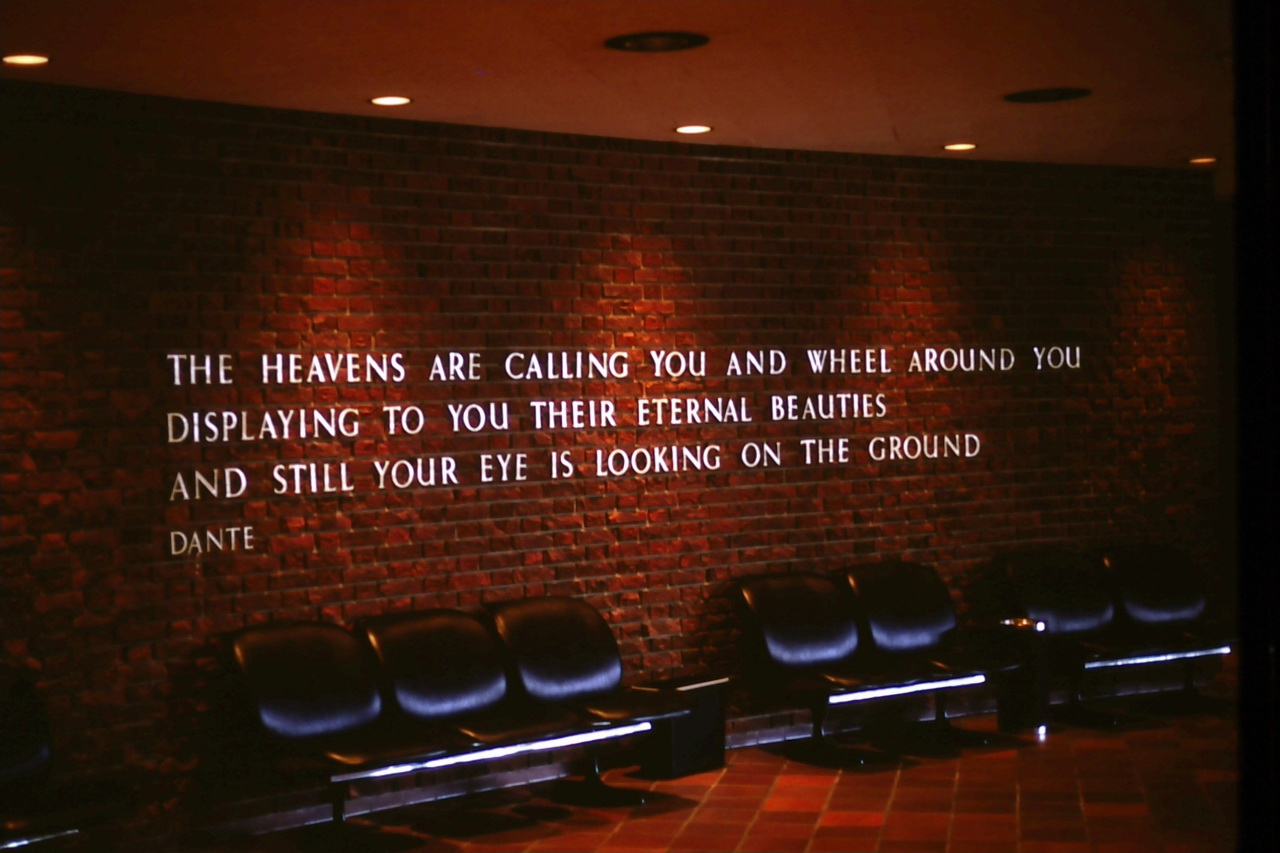
A quote from Dante's Divine Comedy within the entrance hall of the main floor of the McLaughlin Planetarium

The building had two main entrances: a main entrance at ground level that faced east onto Queen's Park Drive, and a connecting passageway from the Royal Ontario Museum from what used to be the Mineralogy Gallery. On the wall opposite from the ticket booth and coat check was an evocative quote from Dante Alighieri Divine Comedy. Admission to either facility allowed visitors to see exhibits in both buildings, though a planetarium show cost extra.

== Zeiss-Jena planetarium projector ==
Zeiss-Jena Planetarium type 23/6 1 - Constellation Figure Projector (North) 2 - Star Globe (North) 3 - Mechanical shutter of star field projector 4 - Milky Way projector (North) 5 - Planetary projectors (North) 6 - Sun, Moon and Vertical circle projectors 7 - Horizon circle projector 8 - Planetary projectors (South) 9 - Star Globe (South) 10 - Compass point projector

The planetarium projector was the focal piece of equipment at the planetarium. It was a Universal Projection Planetarium type 23/6, made by Kombinat VEB Carl Zeiss in Jena, in what was then East Germany.

The planetarium projector was a 13-foot (4.0 m)-long dumbbell-shaped object, with 29-inch (740 mm)-diameter spheres attached at each end representing the night sky for the northern and southern hemispheres. Connecting the two spheres was a framework that held nearly 150 individual projectors, including those dedicated to the planets, the Sun, and specific stars.

Improvements were made to the original planetarium projector over the years, allowing for special effects that could show close-up displays of specific planets, and the Sun and Moon projectors could replicate the experience of a solar or lunar eclipse.

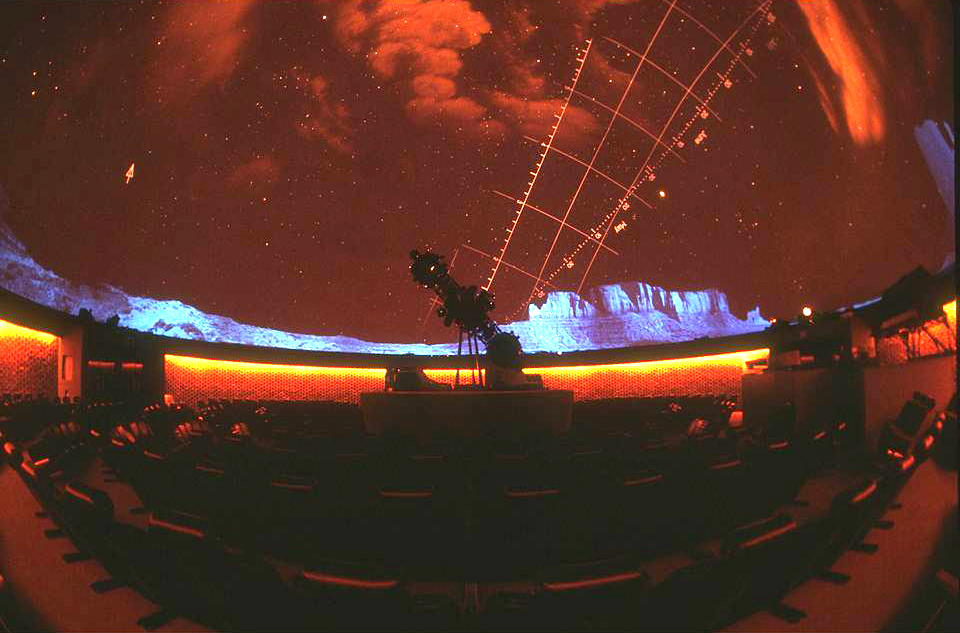
The Zeiss-Jena planetarium projector in action during a show.

The projector could be controlled by a console where an individual presenter would provide specific talks or lectures. By the mid-1970s, automation features were added, which led to the creation of prerecorded shows. Most visitors to the facility would have seen an automated 40- to 45-minute audio/visual show on a particular space-related topic. Two types of shows were typically alternated on a daily basis: one aimed at families with young children and another aimed at older children and adults. Typical shows aimed at both audience types were built around themes such as space travel, the mythical stories behind the constellations, and around Christmas-time, a show that investigated theories on stellar explanations for the Star of Bethlehem. A listing from 1970 includes shows titled The Story of Eclipses, which looked at how solar eclipses occur and their scientific importance, Man and the Zodiac which explored the history of mythology and astrology with regard to the night sky, and The Planet Venus which surveyed the history of the planet in mythology, the planet's motion across the sky and featured imagined views from its surface.

== Renovations in the late 1970s and early 1980s ==
When plans were drawn up for a major expansion of the adjacent Royal Ontario Museum in the mid-1970s, it was initially assumed that the planetarium, then still a comparatively new facility, would be left untouched. As the scope of the expansion increased, it was realized that its north annex would need to be demolished in order to make way for the museum's need for a wing devoted to curatorial facilities. As a result, a theatre entrance, sound studio, workshop, passenger elevator and a third of the existing gallery area of the planetarium had to go. The remaining gallery area was removed in March 1978 to make space for temporary space to replace the workshop and studio.

Significant changes to the planetarium were made during this time, including the addition of a new spiral staircase that led straight to the Theatre of the Stars, an adjacent elevator for the elderly and disabled, and a larger gallery space on the second floor.

The planetarium remained at normal levels of service during this renovation period, but attendance dropped significantly, particularly when the adjacent museum was closed for a period of two years during the most intensive phase of its second major expansion. In all, the construction phase lasted for four years, from 1978 to 1982. In particular, some school groups that could justify the expense of seeing the museum and a planetarium show in a single day's outing had difficulty justifying a visit solely to the planetarium.

== The 1980s and early 1990s ==
Some of the automated "star shows" that appeared in this time interval include: "Planets, Stars, and Galaxies", a general show about our knowledge of astronomy at the time; "Mars, the Journey Begins", the story of the exploration of Mars (from prehistory to the then-present), and possible future plans for terraforming Mars; "Beyond the 4th Dimension", which explored, in layman's terms, the 4 dimensions of General Relativity, the Big Bang and inflation, and the new (at the time) theories of physics that postulated that space has up to 11 dimensions; some of these shows featured creative and novel sound tracks composed by composer-in-residence Mychael Danna.

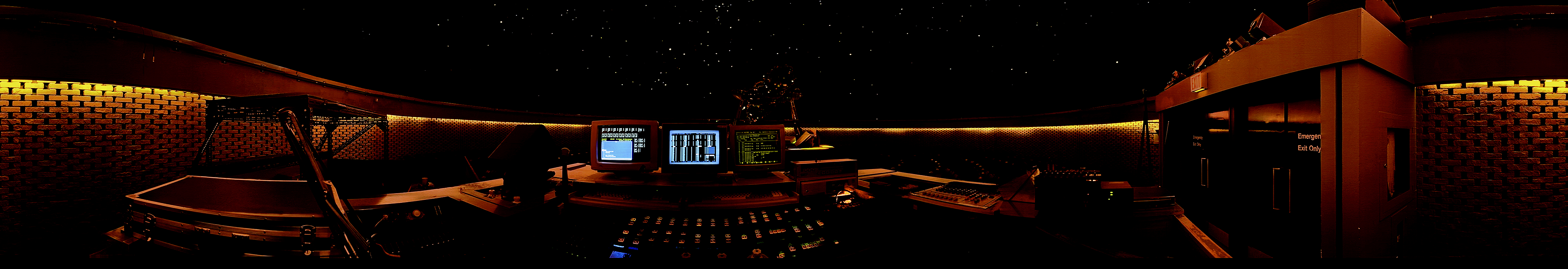
A panorama of the McLaughlin Planetarium Star Theatre as seen from the control console.

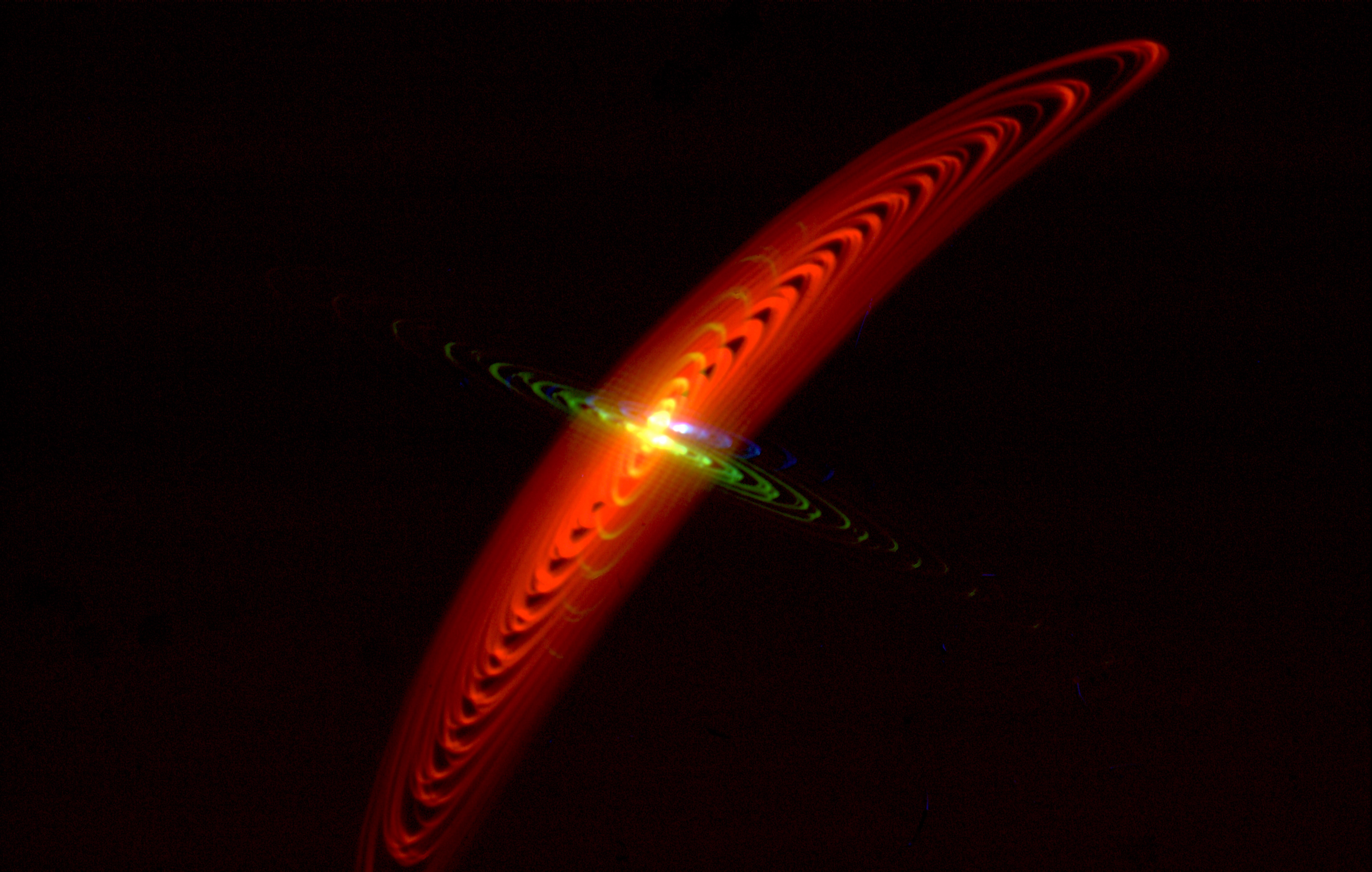
Typical Laser Show at the McLaughlin Planetarium (1977)

While the main attraction continued to be the astronomical shows put on during the day, in the early 1980s, regular laser light shows became a staple evening's entertainment in the city. Typical shows included "Laser Floyd: Dark Side of the Moon", "Laser Zeppelin", "Sgt. Peppers Laser Light Show" and later, such shows of more contemporary musical artists such as "Laser Depeche Mode", "Laser NIN" and "Laser Nirvana". These shows were held under the name "Laserarium" rather than that of the planetarium, though the laser-light and star shows were held in the same building. The laser shows were created by the Florida-based firm Audio Visual Imagineering, whose shows are also seen at other planetaria.

Corporate events were promoted through The Planetcorp and included such events as a CTV Fall season launch as well as corporate AGMs of Sun Microsystems and product launches from NEC and other companies.

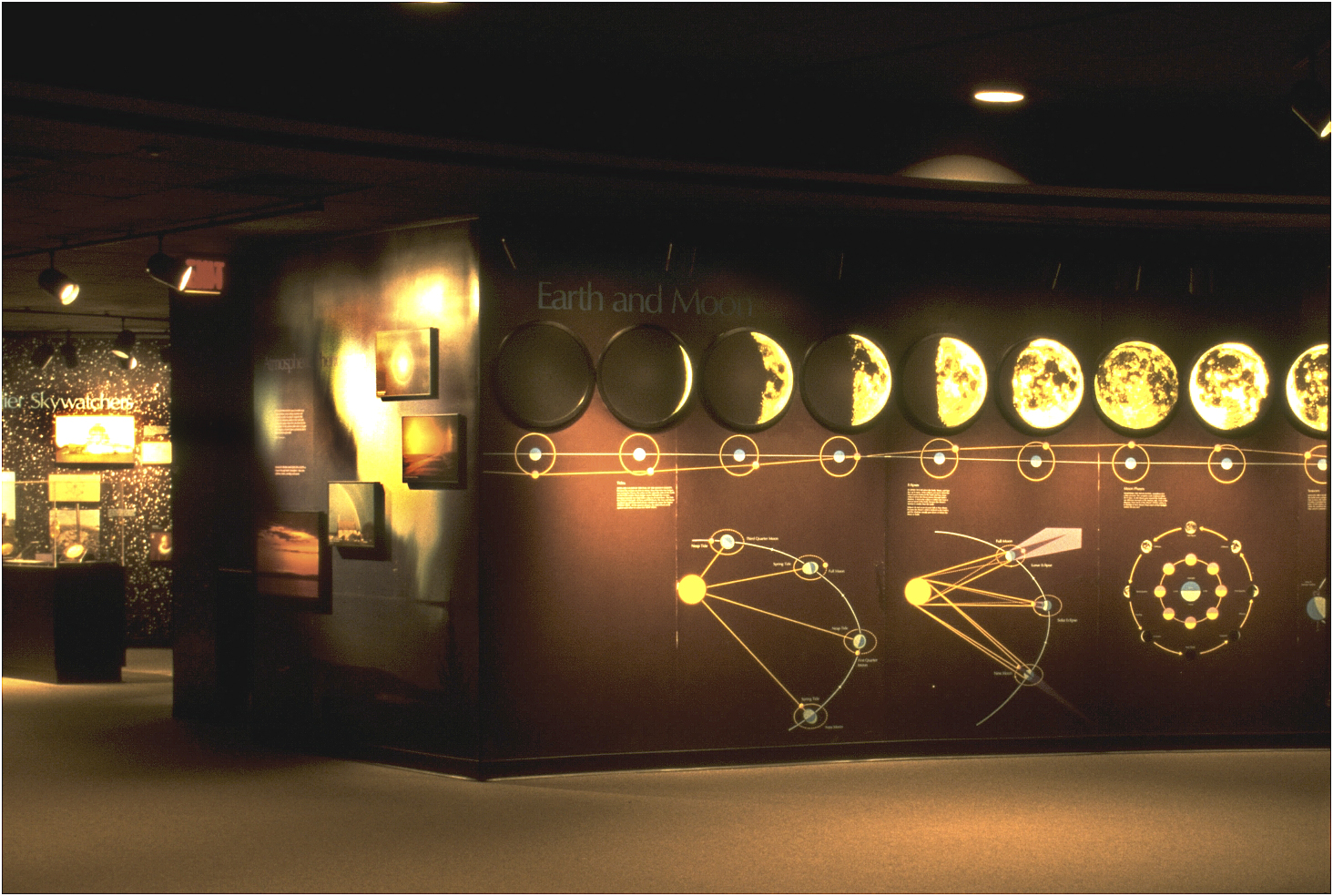
A view of part of the McLaughlin Planetarium Astrocentre Gallery.

Other exhibits in the revamped Astrocentre included a new 50-seat mini-theatre, wall murals illustrating the phases of the moon, plus an increasing number of hands-on exhibits and interactive computer-driven displays. There were also displays of astronomical globes, an orrery and pictures of the planets, many taken by contemporary space probes. The Astrocentre also featured the world's first commercial Stellarium, a slowly rotating display containing a 3D representation of almost a thousand stars in our immediate stellar neighbourhood.

== Closure ==
The McLaughlin Planetarium closed on November 5, 1995. The president of the ROM stated that the closure of the planetarium was due to a combination of falling attendance and a declining interest in space, and that the closure was necessitated by provincial budget cuts. The decision came as a surprise to many, as attendance had rebounded in recent years, and the planetarium was one of few in North America at the time that was turning a profit. The closure meant that 40 people lost their jobs.

Despite the ROM citing lowered attendance figures, proponents of the planetarium have alleged that the Conservative Ontario provincial government of the time, led by Mike Harris, was looking for an instant and visible $600,000 cut to the ROM's operating budget. No succeeding provincial government has shown an interest in reversing this decision.

Shortly after the announcement, the exhibits, seating and wiring were dismantled or removed. Some of the signs and paintings were recovered by the RASC, which had a permanent workspace located within the facility, and are now on display at the E.C. Carr Astronomical Observatory in The Blue Mountains, Ontario and at David Dunlap Observatory in Richmond Hill, Ontario. The original Zeiss-Jena projector was bought as a museum piece by York University for the sum of $1, subsequently dismantled, and placed into storage. More recently, the university has offered the mothballed projector to other planetaria seeking parts to repair their existing electro-mechanical planetarium projectors.

== After the closure ==
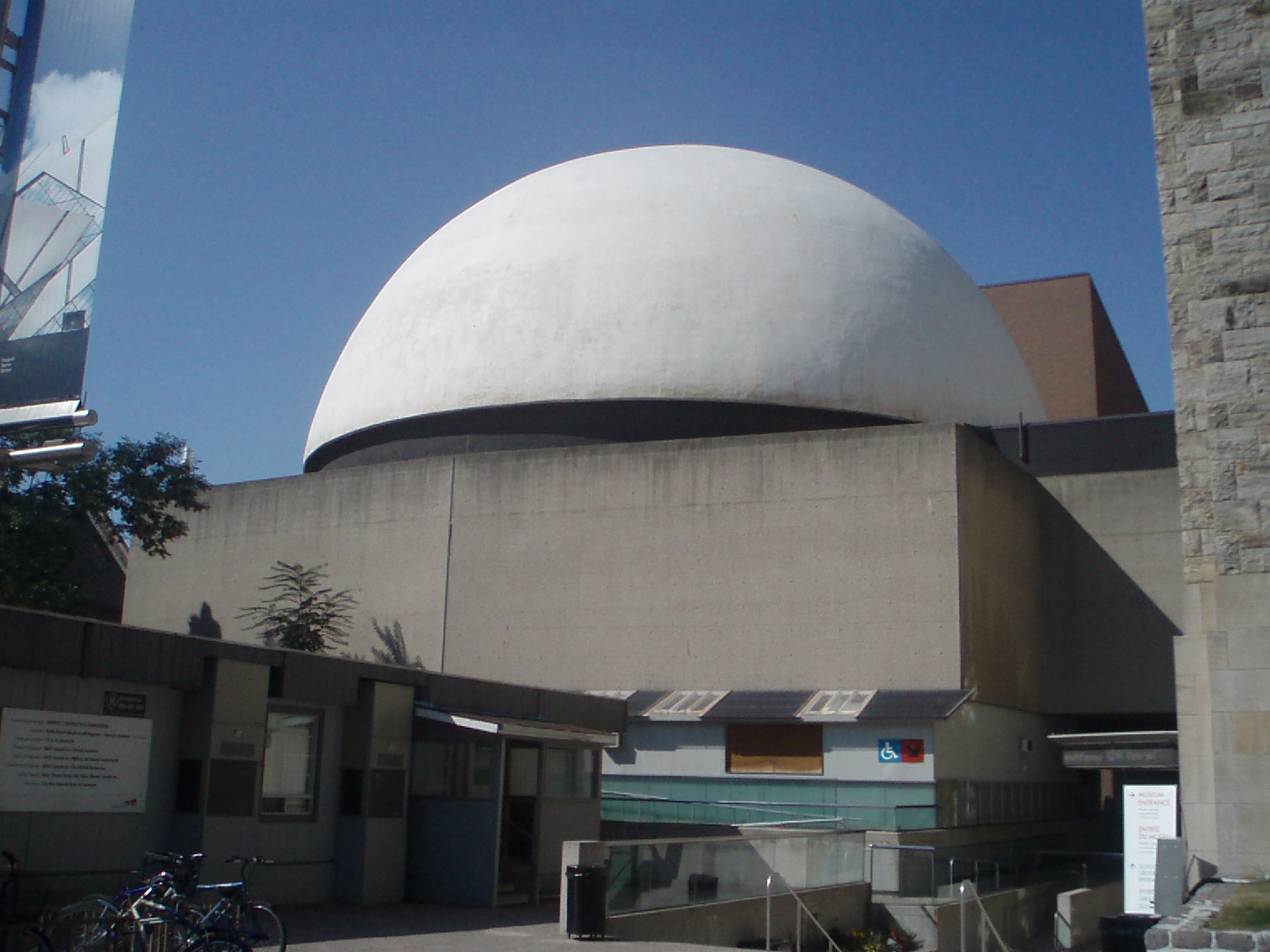
The McLaughlin Planetarium building in 2007, shortly after construction on the adjacent Royal Ontario Museum was completed. Portable construction offices are located where the main entrance once was.

The planetarium had been reopened for other purposes since it closed its doors as a planetarium in 1995. On March 5, 1998, an initial three-year agreement was signed that brought the Children's Own Museum to the second floor of the planetarium, where the Astrocentre used to be. Due to impending construction at the adjacent Royal Ontario Museum, the contract was not renewed in late 2002, and the Children's Own Museum has been looking for a new location ever since. During its three-year tenure in that building, it hosted nearly a half-million visitors. The institution still exists, though it currently (as of 2009) has no physical home. It is currently seeking suitable space to use in future endeavours. In the meantime the organization has participated in various children's events around the city.

Later in 2002, a traveling exhibit of costumes, props and models used in the making of Peter Jackson's Lord of the Rings trilogy ran for four weeks at the planetarium. This was the last public exhibition housed in the building. Up until 2007, the building has primarily served as office space and storage for exhibits that have been moved out of the R.O.M. while the Lee-Chin Crystal wing was under construction.

Ever since the planetarium's closing, there had been groups that lobbied for its reopening. At first, efforts concentrated on reopening the existing facility, but in more recent years, the focus had shifted to establishing a wholly new permanent planetarium facility elsewhere in downtown Toronto. A prominent current group is Space Place Canada, a registered charity formed by experienced planetarium professionals and advocates working to establish a new, state-of-the-art planetarium for the city. Smaller educational planetaria still exist in the Toronto region. At some time after 1995, Seneca College closed its Roberta Bondar Earth and Space Centre planetarium. The Ontario Science Centre on Don Mills Road operates a high-resolution digital planetarium with funding from CA, Inc., and the Royal Ontario Museum also offers a small, portable, inflatable planetarium for school groups.

After the closing, the Ontario Science Centre took over the McLaughlin Planetarium's role as Toronto's public planetarium, though using a much smaller facility.

=== Planned redevelopment ===
On April 14, 2004, the directors put out a call "for expressions of interest" to redevelop the space occupied by the planetarium. Seeking additional funding to cover the costs of the second phase of the expansion and redevelopment of the museum, the directors of the museum had planned on erecting luxury condominiums on the space currently occupied by the planetarium. They abandoned this proposal on November 7, 2005, in the face of widespread public opposition to the construction of a tall residential building in a district of low-rise public buildings. Although in 2007, R.O.M. director William Thorsell reportedly was planning to revive the scheme to place a residential tower on the site.

On January 26, 2009, the R.O.M. announced that it had sold the building and the site for $22 million to the University of Toronto, who originally planned to demolish the existing building and build additional facilities for its law and business faculties.

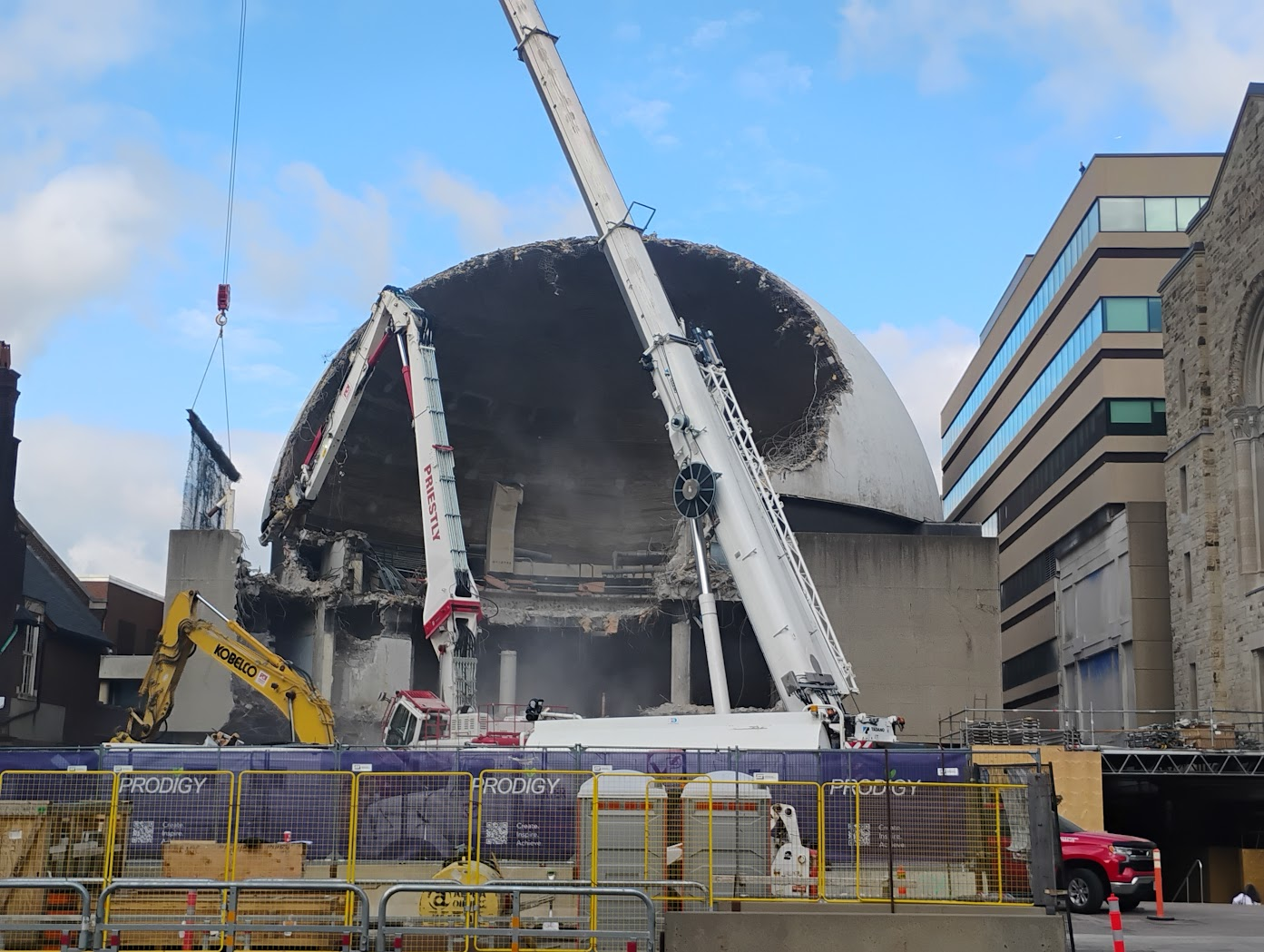
Midway through the demolition of the planetarium, on May 19, 2026

On September 9, 2014, the University of Toronto announced a new museum and academic complex. It was to include the Jewish Museum of Canada, a Faculty of Music performance hall, research centres and History department academic space. In its early stages of planning and approvals the project lacked complete funding at the time of the announcement. In January 2016, the university announced it would proceed with construction of what is now to be called the Centre for Civilizations and Cultures, without the participation of the Jewish Museum of Canada because the UJA "needed to focus on more pressing funding priorities." The project is to be designed by Diller Scofidio + Renfro of New York in collaboration with architectsAlliance of Toronto. The centre is to house the university's Department of History, its Department of Near and Middle Eastern Civilizations, the Institute of Islamic Studies and the research arm for the Tanenbaum Centre for Jewish Studies, and a new 250-seat performance hall for the university's Faculty of Music.

Demolition of the building began in April 2026.

== Curators ==
- Henry C. King (1968–1976)
- Dr. Thomas R. Clarke (1976–1995)

== Literary references ==
In the eponymous short story in the 1982 collection The Moons of Jupiter by Alice Munro, the protagonist visits the planetarium and takes in a show, and then goes on to visit the Royal Ontario Museum. She reports to her father, who is on his deathbed in a Toronto hospital, that she enjoyed the show but found the planetarium to be "a slightly phony temple" to the stars.

In the opening chapter of Robert J. Sawyer's 2000 science fiction novel Calculating God, an alien spaceship lands directly in front of the McLaughlin Planetarium, prior to going on a tour of the exhibits in the Royal Ontario Museum.

== Bibliography ==
- King, Henry C. The McLaughlin Planetarium. Royal Ontario Museum, 1968. ISBN 978-0-8885-4064-5

== Affiliations ==
The museum is affiliated with: CMA, CHIN, and Virtual Museum of Canada.
