= Archworth =

Canadian-bred Thoroughbred racehorse

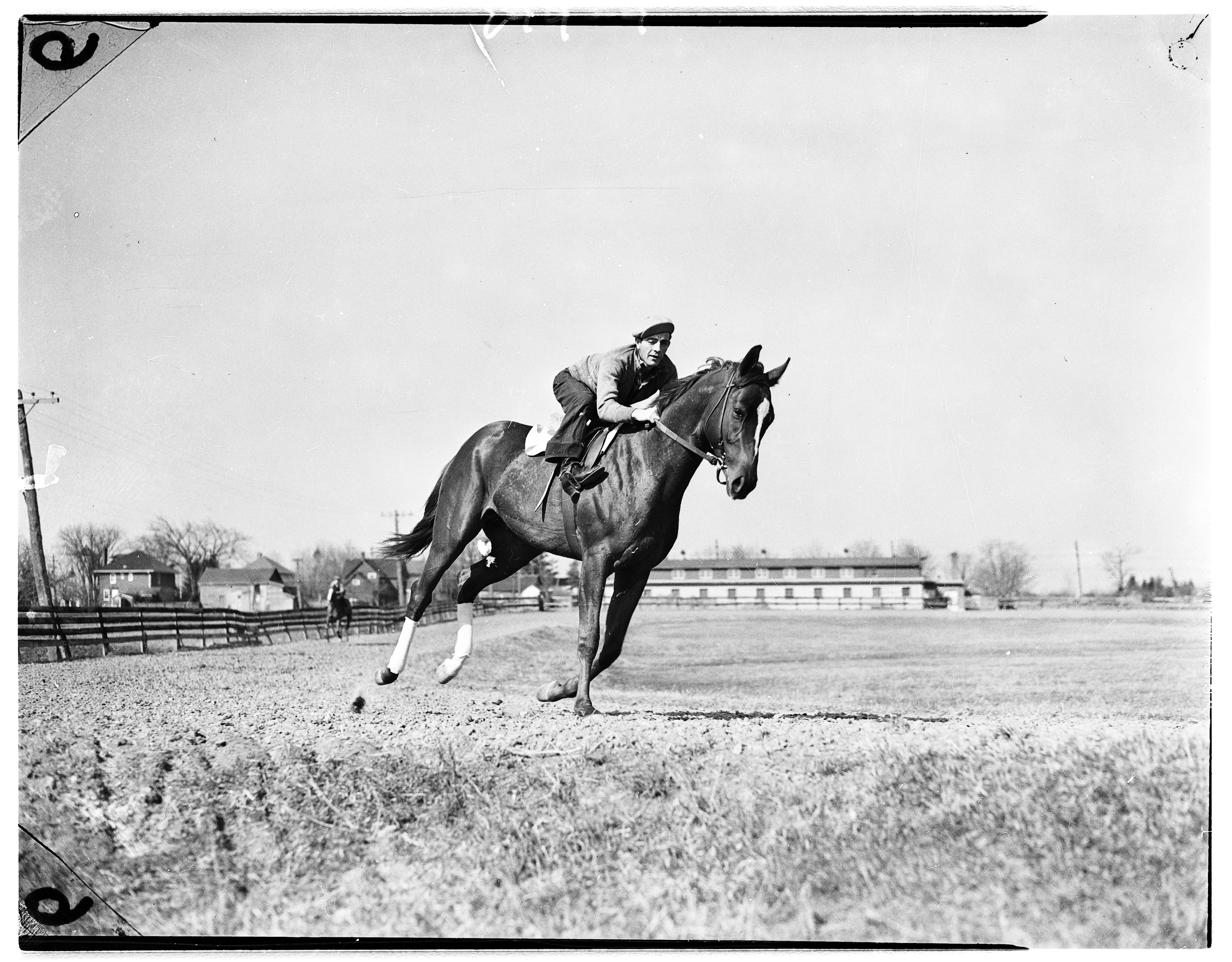
- Racehorse Archworth, 26 April 1939
- Sire: Worthmore
- Grandsire: Thunderer
- Dam: Archipelago
- Damsire: Samoa
- Sex: Stallion
- Foaled: 1936
- Country: Canada
- Colour: Chestnut
- Breeder: William Henry Wright
- Owner: George McCullagh
- Trainer: Mark Cowell
- Record: 47: 15-9-7
- Earnings: $31,234

Major wins
- Clarendon Stakes (1938); Cup and Saucer Stakes (1938) Canadian Triple Crown wins: King's Plate (1939); Prince of Wales Stakes (1939); Breeders' Stakes (1939)

Awards
- Champion 2 and 3 Year-Old Colt in Canada; 2nd Canadian Triple Crown Champion (1939 - retroactive)

Honours
- Canadian Horse Racing Hall of Fame (2014)

Archworth (foaled 1936) was a Thoroughbred racehorse owned by The Globe and Mail publisher George McCullagh that won the 1939 King's Plate, Prince of Wales Plate, and Breeders' Stakes, races that were later designated as the Canadian Triple Crown. Archworth was inducted into the Canadian Horse Racing Hall of Fame in 2014.

== Background ==
Archworth was a chestnut stallion bred in Ontario by William Henry Wright. His sire was the American stakes winner Worthmore, who proved only moderately successful as a sire. Archworth's dam Archipelego was by Samoa, who was imported from Britain and became a moderately successful sire.

Archworth was purchased as a yearling in 1937 by George McCullagh, the publisher of The Globe and Mail, for $500. He was trained by Mark Cowell.

== Racing career ==
Archworth raced nine times at age two, with four wins including the Cup and Saucer Stakes and Clarendon Stakes. He was named the Canadian champion two-year-old of 1938.

At age three, Archworth raced 16 times with five wins and three second-place finishes and was named the Canadian champion three-year-old of 1939. He is best known for winning the King's Plate (known as the Queen's Plate when the sovereign is a female) in the first year in which the race was restricted to three-year-olds. It was the first time the Plate had been attended by the ruling monarch, King George VI. Archworth won in a "runaway affair" by ten lengths, and King George presented 60 gold-plated sovereigns and a gold-plated trophy to McCullagh. Queen Elizabeth Bowes-Lyon was impressed by the colt's front-running style, saying "Never have I seen a horse go out and take such a long lead and hold it." McCullagh gave credit to the colt's breeder, William Wright, saying: "It's a great day for me, but I am only the stuffed shirt who bought him for $500. My thrill is nothing at all compared to the joy in Bill Wright's heart. It's been a lifelong dream. When he came to this country from England he used to watch the races at Woodbine from a knothole in the fence. Standing there, he vowed that if he ever struck it rich, he would try to breed a winner of the Plate. The dream came true today. All the credit goes to Bill, to trainer Mark Cowell, and to jockey Denny Birley."

In 1939, Archworth also won the Prince of Wales Plate and Breeders' Stakes. In 1959, the Canadian Triple Crown of Thoroughbred Racing was formed using these races and the King/Queen's Plate, but only horses that won the races from 1959 onward were recognized as Triple Crown winners. It was not until 2014 that the early winners of the three races were retroactively acknowledged. Archworth then became known as Canada's second Triple Crown winner.

Archworth's later career was undistinguished, with only 1 win from 9 starts in 1940 and 5 wins from 13 starts in 1941. In October 1940, he ran second in the Sennings Park Handicap at Aqueduct Racetrack in New York. Similar to his performance in the King's Plate the year before, he opened a large lead down the backstretch. This time however he was caught in the stretch and lost by a head. In 1941, he finished third in the Hendrie Memorial Handicap and Queen’s Cup Handicap and won the Maple Leaf Hockey Club handicap, an overnight night stakes.

== Retirement ==
Archworth was retired to stud where he had an undistinguished career. Jockey Club statistics show he had 45 foals of whom 39 became runners with 24 winning at least one race. His most successful offspring was Victory Arch, who won 14 races from 38 starts, including the Prince of Wales Plate.
