= Salon Camden =

Salon Camden logo.

Salon Camden is an interactive socio-cultural salon where residents of Toronto, Ontario, Canada meet. Salon Camden is one of the few salons held in Canada. It was founded by Azmi Haq.

Salon Camden promotes urban discourse, in cozy salon settings, on subjects spanning art, culture, socio-economic issues, geopolitics and philosophy. Salon Camden was founded in 2008 by Azmi Haq along with Kevin Stolarik, Mahreen Haq, James Meers and Noor Haq. It is an interactive modern-day forum evoking the Parisian Salons of the 18th century. In 2018, Noor Haq took over as Director of programming. Salon Camden is recognized as the Premier Canadian Salon inspiring a salon fervor in Toronto that has extended to TEDx Toronto, Brama & Bluma Appel Salon, the Martin Prosperity Institute, Toronto Literary Salon, 1837, Salon Voltaire and beyond. Since its inception, Salon Camden has held over 80 Salon dinners involving thousands of participants in interactive conversations covering major topics of our time. In 2010, Salon Camden International was launched with events held in Bangalore, St. Petersburg, Montreal, Dubai, Tokyo, Abu Dhabi and Lahore. Salon events are by invitation only. The first Camden File session featured the topic of "Streets of TO: Who's Space is it Anyway? The session included Christopher Hume, a Toronto Star columnist as well as Matt Blackett, the founder of Spacing magazine. Salon Camden has also launched Salon Camden International, hosting events in Abu Dhabi, United Arab Emirates, St. Petersburg, Russia, and Lahore, Pakistan. Plans are currently underway to host future Salon Camden International events in various cities, including Tokyo, Japan.

Salon Camden had also launched the Centre for Urban Dialogue, an initiative that attempts to better engage youth in the civic process. Volunteers from the Centre partnered with film students from Sheridan College to create a series of films that look at the perspectives of Toronto youth on the 2010 Toronto municipal election and politics in general.

== Recent dinner talks ==
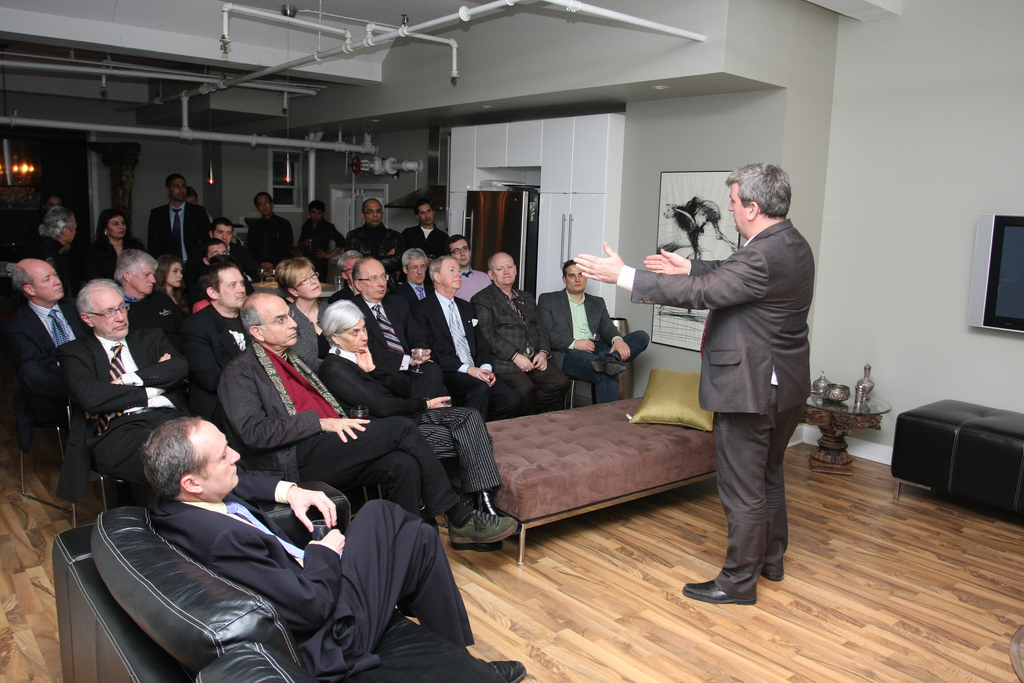
Hon. Glen Murray, Ontario's Minister of Research and Innovation, addressing guests of Salon Camden

- Young Leaders Series - Streets of Toronto: Whose space is it anyway?
- Azmi Haq Stabilizing Afghanistan in an increasingly unstable region
- Michael Taylor - Sketches of Frank Gehry - A look at the life and career of Architect Frank Gehry
- Former Canadian Minister of Foreign Affairs, Hon. Pierre Pettigrew - Canada's International Role In the Emerging World Order
- Former Deputy Premier of Ontario, Hon. George Smitherman - Green Energy: A Driver of Ontario's Economy
- Former Canadian Minister of Foreign Affairs, Hon. Pierre Pettigrew, PC - Canada's Emerging Role in the International World Order
- Former Canadian High Commissioner to India, Peter Sutherland - The Promise of India: An Opportunity for Ontario
- Canadian Minister of Citizenship, Immigration, and Multiculturalism, Hon. Jason Kenney, PC - Canadian multiculturalism: opportunities in the new decade
- Mayor of Toronto, John Tory - Toronto: time for us to engage
- Chief Executive Officer of the Royal Ontario Museum, William Thorsell - The plight of the physical city
- Canadian Government House Leader, Hon. John Baird, PC- Federal Conservatives in Ontario: where's the winning strategy?
- Ontario's Minister of Research and Innovation, Hon. Glen Murray - Canadian Liberalism In the 21st Century
