= William Henry Wright =

Canadian prospector (1876–1951)

- Born: 21 April 1876; Sleaford, Lincolnshire
- Died: 20 September 1951 (aged 75); Barrie, Ontario
- Military career
- Branch: British Army; Canadian Army
- Service years: 1896–1903, 1916–1919
- Units: 18th Royal Hussars; Canadian Army Service Corps
- Conflicts: Second Boer War; World War I

William Henry Wright (21 April 1876 – 20 September 1951) was a Canadian prospector. In 1911, he discovered the Kirkland Lake Break, which hosted seven gold-producing mines. He used the proceeds from his gold finds to launch a national newspaper in Canada, The Globe and Mail.

== Early life ==
Wright was born in Sleaford, Lincolnshire, England. As a teenager, he worked as a butcher's apprentice. In 1897, he joined the British army and served both at home and in the colonies. He served through the Second Boer War and survived the siege of Ladysmith.

After the war he came into the possession of a Veteran's Lot in the Porcupine area of Ontario. As Pain points out, "The proverbial luck of the British Army was with him." This lot was later sold by Wright to the Buffalo-Ankerite Mine for reaping him a hefty profit. This in addition to his later discovery of free gold along the Main Break quartz vein in 1911, though "he knew nothing of mining or geology."

In 1907, Wright moved to Canada joining his sister, Frances Wright, and her husband, Edward Hargreaves, a master butcher in northern Ontario. The three of them went to Cobalt, Ontario in search of work. Wright and Hargreaves worked at a variety of odd jobs before attempting prospecting. They started in Cobalt, then went on to Porcupine, and finally to Kirkland Lake.

== The discovery ==
One evening in July 1911, Hargreaves became lost while hunting for rabbits. He fired a shot to attract the Wrights' attention. Wright walked towards Hargreaves and stumbled across a quartz outcrop. It was almost dusk, but he could see free gold in reddish feldspar porphyry. The next day, they staked three claims, two of which turned out to be directly on the fault line of the area. The partners staked more claims over the following weeks. This initial discovery was the first rich find that established the Kirkland Lake camp.

Soon after the claims were made, the partnership ended. Hargreaves needed to support his wife, so he sold his interest in the claims. Wright was single. He held onto his interest, despite a lack of funds and harsh conditions. He was determined to hold and work the claims.

The ground staked by Wright and Hargreaves eventually became three mines: Sylvanite, Lakeshore and Wright-Hargreaves. The gold extracted from these three mines totaled 13.5 million ounces. Wright had sold the claims that became Sylvanite to Harry Oakes in exchange for Lakeshore property, shares in the mine and a vice-presidency. The mine for which Wright is best known is the one that bears his name, the Wright Hargreaves.

== World War I ==
In 1916, Wright felt the need to support the Allies in World War I. Though he was a millionaire and almost forty years old, he joined the Canadian Expeditionary Force as a private. According to Pain, Wright "must have been the wealthiest private in the Army." He remained a private throughout the war, though he had to turn down the opportunity of promotion several times.

== Post-war career ==
After the war, he focused on the Wright-Hargreaves mine. He became vice-president of the Lake Shore and Wright-Hargreaves companies. It operated from 1921 to 1965 and was one of Canada's premier gold mines. The profits from this mine were used to build a major mining company with interests across Canada.

In 1936, Wright was approached by George McCullagh with the idea of acquiring two Toronto newspapers, The Globe and The Mail and Empire, and merging them. Wright went along with the plan and founded The Globe and Mail, which became Canada's national newspaper. Until it moved to its current location in the early 1970s, The Globe and Mail was published in the art deco William H. Wright Building at 140 King St. W. in Toronto's financial district, since demolished.

In his later years, Wright lived in Barrie, Ontario, performed community work and raised horses. He was the breeder of Archworth, winner of the 1939 King's Plate. McCullagh, who had purchased the horse from Wright as a yearling, said, "It's a great day for me, but I am only the stuffed shirt who bought him for $500. My thrill is nothing at all compared to the joy in Bill Wright's heart. It's been a lifelong dream. When he came to this country from England he used to watch the races at Woodbine from a knothole in the fence. Standing there, he vowed that if he ever struck it rich, he would try to breed a winner of the Plate. The dream came true today."
