= John Stackhouse (journalist) =

Canadian journalist and author (born 1962)

- Born: 1962 (age 63–64)
- Education: Queen's University
- Occupations: former Editor-in-Chief, The Globe and Mail

John Stackhouse (born 1962) is a Canadian former journalist, author and currently lobbyist. He graduated from Queen's University in 1985 with a Bachelor of Commerce degree. While at Queen's, he served as editor of the Queen's Journal, and won the Tricolour Award in 1985.

He joined The Globe and Mail in 1992. He was the editor of The Globe and Mail's Report on Business section. On 25 May 2009, he was promoted to editor-in-chief of the newspaper, replacing Edward Greenspon. On 19 March 2014, he was, in turn, replaced by David Walmsley.

Since January 2015, Stackhouse has been the Senior Vice-President, Office of the CEO, at the Royal Bank of Canada, in such capacity he has an advisory role, where he will be "responsible for gathering and interpreting global economic, business, political and social trends and providing the leadership team and board with insights". Additionally, Stackhouse "has joined the boards of the C.D. Howe Institute and World Literacy Canada and become a senior fellow at the University of Toronto's Munk School of Global Affairs.

== Awards and recognition ==
- 1994: winner, National Newspaper Awards, one prize for Feature Writing
- 1997: winner, National Newspaper Awards, two prizes for Business Reporting and International Reporting
- 1999: winner, National Newspaper Awards, two prizes for Feature Writing and International Reporting

== Bibliography ==
- 2000: Out of Poverty: And Into Something More Comfortable (Random House), ISBN 0-679-31025-8; Stackhouse, John (2 November 2011). 2001 pbk edition. Random House of Canada. ISBN 978-0-679-31098-3.
- 2003: Timbit Nation: A Hitchhiker's View of Canada (Random House), ISBN 0-679-31167-X; Stackhouse, John (5 November 2010). 2010 edition. Random House of Canada. ISBN 978-0-307-36659-7.
- 2015: Mass Disruption: Thirty Years on the Front Lines of a Media Revolution (Random House Canada), ISBN 978-0-345-81583-5
