= James Griffith (disambiguation) =

James Griffith (1916–1993) was an American character actor, musician and screenwriter.

James Griffith may also refer to:

- James Griffith (academic) (1761–1821), English academic and administrator
- James Bray Griffith (1871–1937), American business theorist
- James Milo Griffith (1843–1897), Welsh sculptor
- Jim Griffith, folklorist who won a 2011 National Heritage Fellowship

== See also ==
- James Griffiths (disambiguation)
- James Griffyth Fairfax (1886–1976), British poet, translator, and politician
