= Edward Greenspon =

Canadian journalist (born 1957)

Edward Greenspon (born March 26, 1957) is a Canadian journalist who was Editor-in-Chief of The Globe and Mail newspaper and President of the Public Policy Forum think tank. He joined Bloomberg News in January 2014 as Editor-at-Large for Canada after four years as vice president of strategic investments for Star Media Group, a division of Torstar Corp. and publisher of the Toronto Star. Before that, he was the editor-in-chief of The Globe and Mail newspaper, based in Toronto, Ontario, Canada, for seven years. In 2002, he assumed the position at a turning point in the paper's history, and, during his tenure, he instituted several sectional revamps, launched new web sites and maintained circulation levels. On May 25, 2009, he was replaced by John Stackhouse.

Greenspon is a former managing editor of the Globe's Report on Business section and was the Globe's Ottawa bureau chief before becoming editor-in-chief. He was the founding editor of globeandmail.com.

Greenspon is currently co-Chair of the Future of Canada Centre and an executive advisor with Deloitte Canada.

== Early life ==
Greenspon was born in Montreal, Quebec, on March 26, 1957. His father, Mortimer Greenspon, was an insurance agent and financial planner, while his mother, Rosalie, was a teacher. Edward Greenspon's first job was as a paperboy for the now defunct Montreal Star. Greenspon's interest in journalism began as the Watergate scandal broke. Inspired by Bob Woodward and Carl Bernstein, he chose to go to Ottawa and study journalism and political science at Carleton University.

== Education ==
Greenspon began his journalism career at Carleton University. While living on campus he worked for the residence newspaper, The Resin. Greenspon broke a story of corruption with the residence student government. He exposed student officials who misappropriated student fees to buy champagne, lobsters, and cigars. The story was soon picked up by the Ottawa Citizen. Later, the disgraced treasurer was denied a job at the Canadian Security Intelligence Service (CSIS) after a background check revealed the article in the Citizen. Greenspon graduated from Carleton in 1979 with honours. He earned an M.Sc. at the London School of Economics after winning a Commonwealth Scholarship.

After stints with papers in Western Canada, Greenspon went on to study with the assistance of a Commonwealth Scholarship at the London School of Economics in England. He received his master's degree in politics and government in 1985.

== The Globe and Mail ==
Greenspon began working at The Globe and Mail in 1986 as a reporter for the paper's Report on Business section. He soon found himself back in London as the Globe's first European business correspondent.

With the collapse of communism, he and his colleagues in the London bureau spent most of the 1989 to 1991 period in Eastern Europe and the Soviet Union. In 1991, Greenspon returned to Canada and became the managing editor of the Report on Business section and then deputy managing editor of the newspaper. Following his lifelong fascination with politics, Greenspon became the Ottawa bureau chief and associate editor of the paper in 1993, a position he held for more than six years.

In 1996, Greenspon partnered with Anthony Wilson-Smith to write the book Double Vision. The work is a thorough analysis of the first three years, from 1993 to 1996, of the Liberal government led by Prime Minister Jean Chrétien and Finance Minister Paul Martin and received the Canadian Economics Association's Douglas Purvis Prize for excellence in public policy writing.

In 1999, at the height of a newspaper war in Canada, Greenspon was asked to commute to Toronto to manage the newsroom in the capacity of executive news editor. During this period, he became the founding editor for the Globe's internet site, www.theglobeandmail.com, and encouraged the paper to heavily invest in the soon to be very important internet news market.

In late 2000, he returned to Ottawa as political editor and columnist in time for his third national election campaign and co-wrote a second book called Searching for Certainty: Inside the New Canadian Mindset with pollster Darrell Bricker. Greenspon won the Hyman Solomon Award for his contributions to public policy writing.

In 2002, Greenspon accepted a position as the new editor-in-chief of the Globe and moved to Toronto. As chief editor, Greenspon instituted several changes to the paper, including a revamped Report on Business section, more investigative journalism, expanded politics coverage, and a new Science and Technology page. In 2007, he led a major redesign of The Globe that introduced the Globe Life section, reportonbusiness.com and globesports.com, as well as placing a greater emphasis on investigative journalism and web-print integration.

During his tenure, The Globe led every year in the number of National Newspaper Awards and won the Michener Award for Public Service Journalism in an unprecedented three out of four years for stories about the sponsorship scandal, foot-dragging over introduction of the anti-breast cancer drug, Herceptin, and Afghan detainees. He also locked horns with former Brian Mulroney in revealing secret cash payments the former Prime Minister had received from German-Canadian businessman, Karl-Heinz Schreiber.

On May 25, 2009, Greenspon was fired as editor-in-chief by Globe publisher Phillip Crawley. He was replaced by John Stackhouse. He subsequently headed up a 12-person panel for the Canadian International Council that produced a major report called 'Open Canada: A Global Positioning Strategy for a Networked Age' before joining Star Media Group in 2010.

== Major works ==
- Double Vision, by Edward Greenspon and Anthony Wilson-Smith, Toronto 1996, Doubleday Canada publishers, ISBN 0-385-25613-2.
- Searching for Certainty: Inside the New Canadian Mindset, by Edward Greenspon and Darrell Bricker, Toronto 2001, Doubleday Canada publishers, ISBN 978-0385259668.
- Open Canada: A Global Positioning Strategy for a Networked Age, by Edward Greenpson, 2010, Canadian International Council, ISBN 978-0-9866175-1-5 (online)

Media offices
Preceded by Richard Addis	Editor of 'The Globe and Mail'; March 2002 - May 2009	Succeeded by John Stackhouse
