= Globe and Mail Centre =

Building

Coordinates: 43.65149°N 79.36444°W

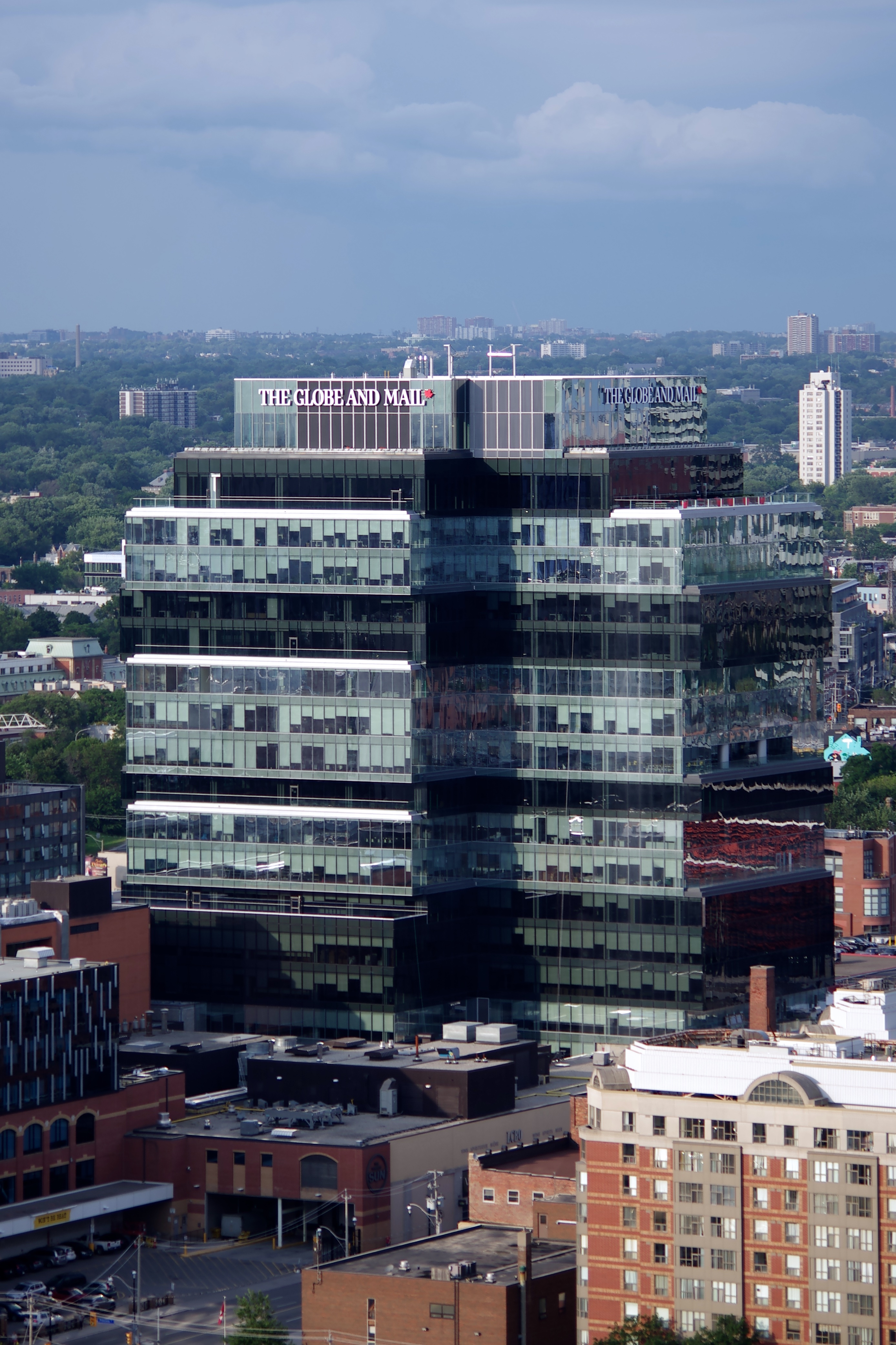
Looking east toward the new Globe and Mail Centre

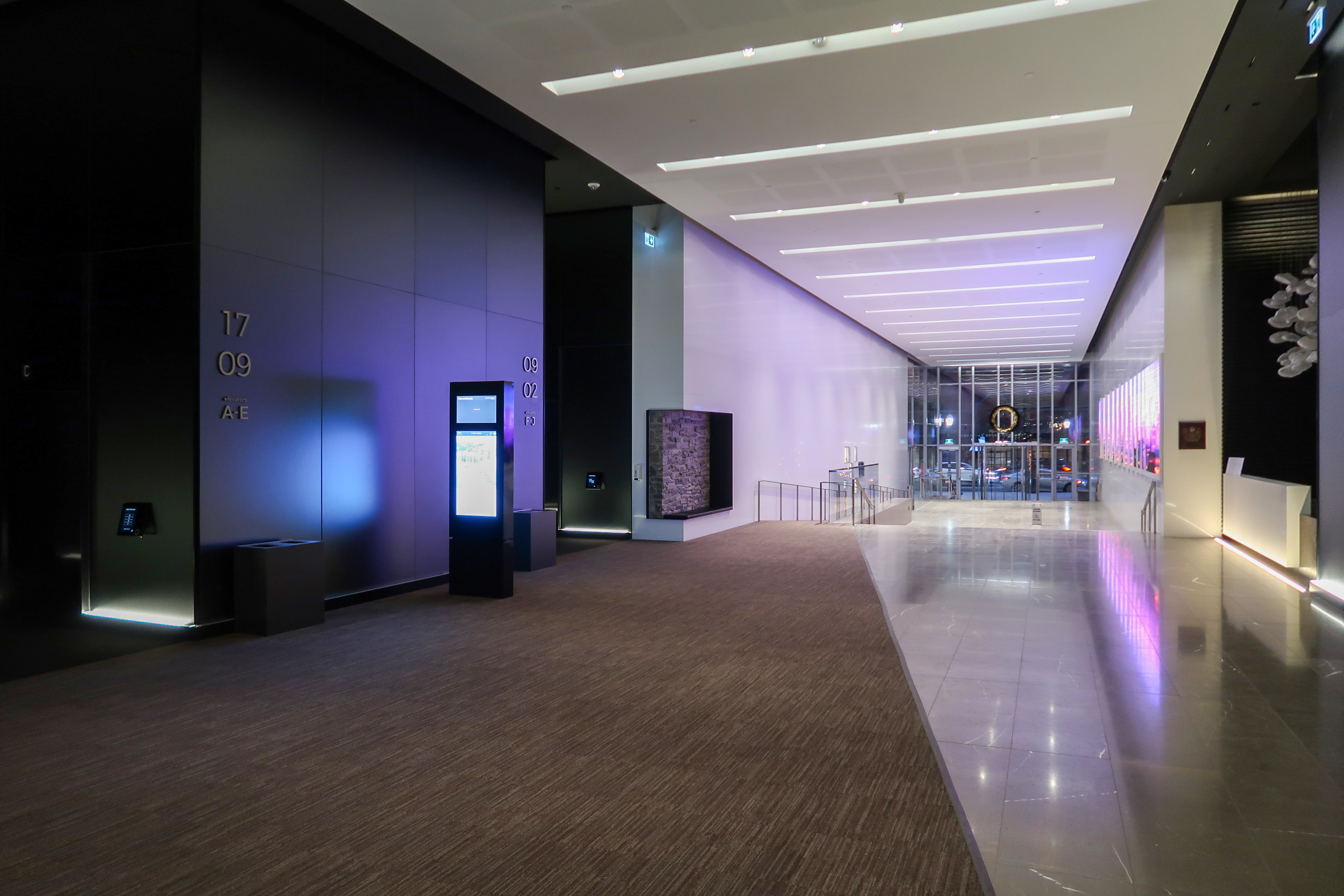
Globe and Mail Centre lobby

The Globe and Mail Centre is a 17-storey building, on King Street East, in Toronto, Ontario, Canada, that houses the offices of The Globe and Mail newspaper, and other tenants. The building is adjacent to the former offices of rival newspaper the Toronto Sun, towering over it. Archeologists were allowed to excavate the foundations of Berkeley House, which were uncovered while removing a parking lot in preparation for digging foundations for the new building.

The building was complete enough for some tenants to move in during 2016.

== Design ==
The Globe and Mail Centre is architecturally notable; designed by award-winning architects Diamond & Schmitt, it features a glass façade that allows natural light to permeate the interior spaces, which feature modern finishes and sleek design. The building has a four-storey podium, sitting on top of multiple storeys of subterranean parking and a ground floor that houses several small shops. An additional thirteen storeys of offices occupy the tower, which is capped by a "green roof".

In addition to its primary office function, the Globe and Mail Centre also contains an event venue that is frequently rented to private individuals and organizations. The building features a range of event spaces, including a grand ballroom that can accommodate up to 1,000 guests, a spacious lobby for receptions, and numerous conference rooms, equipped with modern AV equipment, for smaller events.
