= The Globe and Mail =

English-language newspaper in Canada

- Canada's National Newspaper

- The January 25, 2013 front page of The Globe and Mail
- Type: Daily newspaper
- Format: Broadsheet
- Owner: The Woodbridge Company
- Founder: George Brown (Note: Brown founded the earliest predecessor to The Globe and Mail, The Globe. The Toronto Mail was another predecessor newspaper founded by Thomas Patteson. The Empire was another predecessor newspaper founded by John A. Macdonald. The merger of The Globe and The Daily Mail and Empire was arranged by George McCullagh and was financed by William Henry Wright.)
- Publisher: Andrew Saunders
- Editor-in-chief: David Walmsley
- Founded: March 5, 1844; 182 years ago (Note: The following date was when The Globe published its first edition. The Globe later merged with The Mail and Empire to form The Globe and Mail on November 23, 1936.)
- Headquarters: Globe and Mail Centre; 351 King Street East; Toronto, Ontario; M5A 1L1
- Circulation: 65,749 Daily; 117,955 Saturday (as of 2022)
- ISSN: 0319-0714
- OCLC number: 61312660
- Website: theglobeandmail.com

The Globe and Mail is a Canadian newspaper printed in five cities in western and central Canada. With a weekly readership of more than 6 million in 2024, it is Canada's most widely read newspaper on weekdays and Saturdays, although it falls slightly behind the Toronto Star in overall weekly circulation because the Star publishes a Sunday edition, whereas the Globe does not. The Globe and Mail is regarded by some as Canada's "newspaper of record".

The Globe and Mail's predecessors, The Globe and The Daily Mail and Empire were both established in the 19th century. The former was established in 1844, while the latter was established in 1895 through a merger of The Toronto Mail and The Empire. In 1936, The Globe and The Mail and Empire merged to form The Globe and Mail. The newspaper was acquired by FP Publications in 1965, who later sold the paper to the Thomson Corporation in 1980. In 2001, the paper merged with broadcast assets held by BCE Inc. to form the joint venture Bell Globemedia. In 2010, direct control of the newspaper was reacquired by the Thomson family through its holding company, the Woodbridge Company. The Woodbridge Company acquired BCE's remaining stake in the newspaper in 2015.

== History ==
=== Predecessors and establishment ===
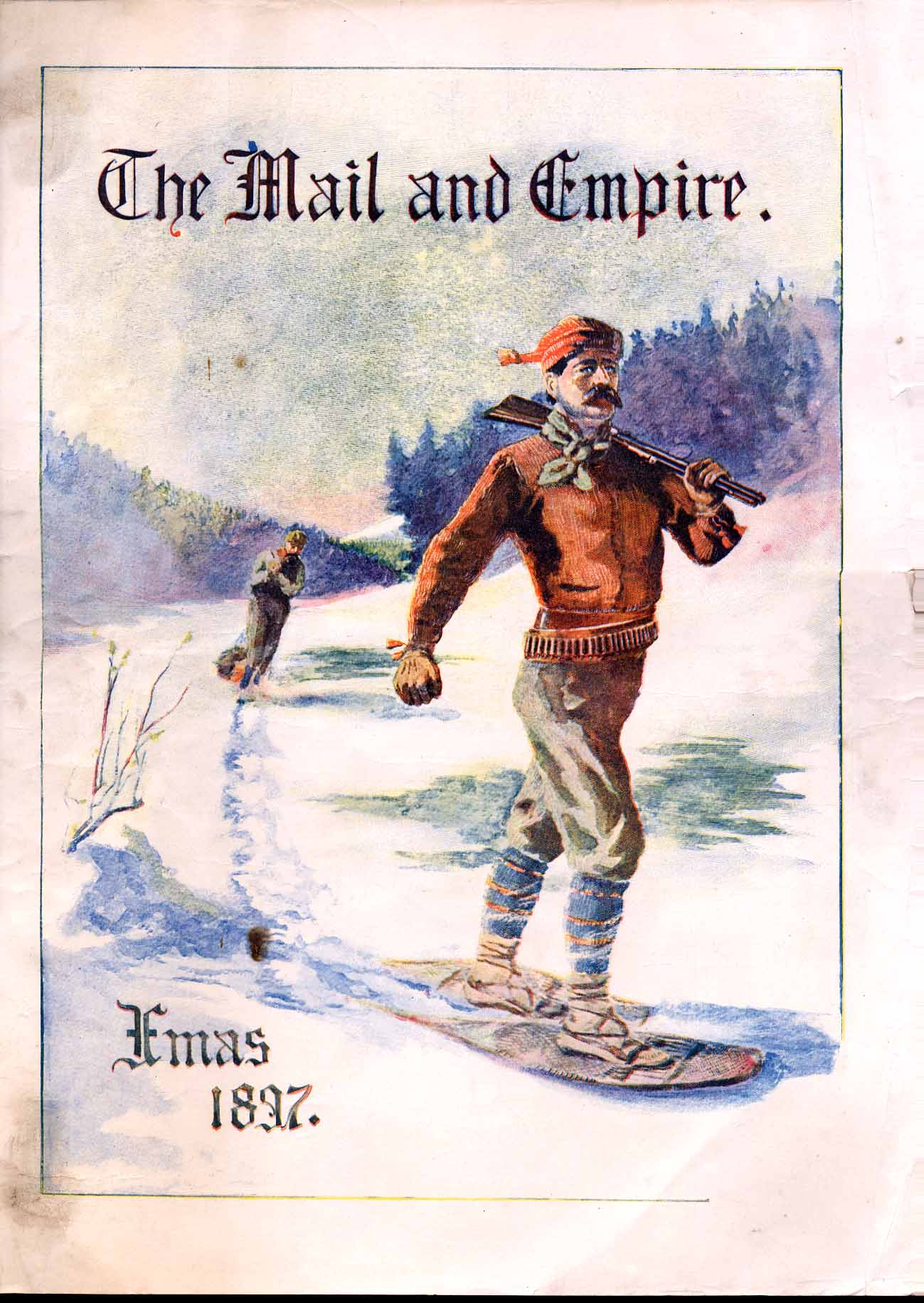
Cover for The Mail and Empire, a newspaper and predecessor to the modern The Globe and Mail

The predecessor to The Globe and Mail was called The Globe; it was founded in 1844 by Scottish immigrant George Brown, who became a Father of Confederation. Brown's liberal politics led him to court the support of the Clear Grits, a precursor to the modern Liberal Party of Canada. The Globe began in Toronto as a weekly party organ for Brown's Reform Party, but seeing the economic gains he could make in the newspaper business, Brown soon targeted a wide audience of liberal-minded freeholders. He selected as the motto for the editorial page a quotation from Junius, "The subject who is truly loyal to the Chief Magistrate will neither advise nor submit to arbitrary measures." The quotation is carried on the editorial page to this day.

By the 1850s, The Globe had become an independent and well-regarded daily newspaper. It began distribution by railway to other cities in Ontario shortly after Confederation. At the dawn of the twentieth century, The Globe added photography, a women's section, and the slogan "Canada's National Newspaper", which remains on its front-page banner. It began opening bureaus and offering subscriptions across Canada.

The Daily Mail and Empire was another newspaper that served as The Globe and Mail''s predecessor, having been formed through a merger of two conservative newspapers, The Toronto Mail and The Empire in 1895. The Toronto Mail was established in 1872, while The Empire was founded in 1887 by Brown's former rival, Conservative politician and then-Prime Minister John A. Macdonald.

On November 23, 1936, The Globe merged with The Mail and Empire. The merger was arranged by George McCullagh, who fronted for mining magnate William Henry Wright and became the first publisher of The Globe and Mail. Press reports at the time stated that "the minnow swallowed the whale" because The Globe's circulation (at 78,000) was smaller than that of The Mail and Empire (118,000).

=== 1930s–1990s ===
From 1937 until 1974, the newspaper was produced at the William H. Wright Building, located at then 140 King Street West on the northeast corner of King Street and York Street, close to the homes of the Toronto Daily Star at Old Toronto Star Building at 80 King West and the Old Toronto Telegram Building at Bay and Melinda. The building at 130 King Street West was demolished in 1974 to make way for First Canadian Place.

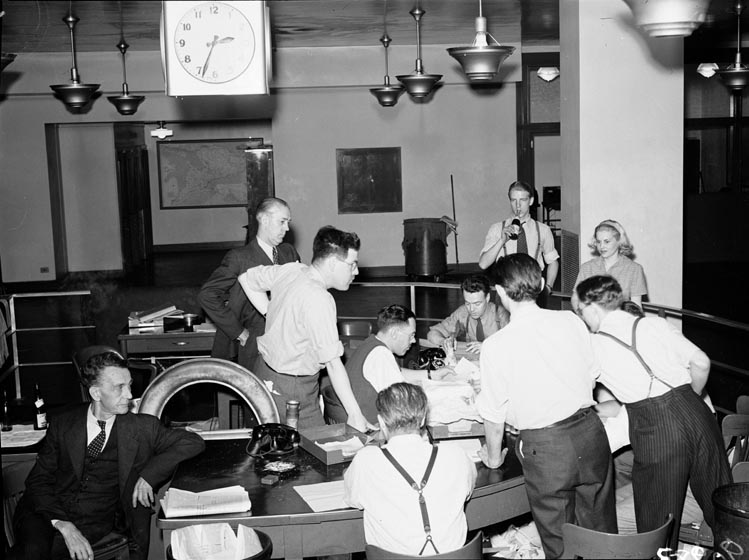
The Globe and Mail staff await news of the D-Day invasion. June 6, 1944.

McCullagh committed suicide in 1952, and the newspaper was sold to the Webster family of Montreal. As the paper lost ground to The Toronto Star in the local Toronto market, it began to expand its national circulation. The newspaper was unionized in 1955, under the banner of the American Newspaper Guild.

In 1965, the paper was bought by Winnipeg-based FP Publications, controlled by Bryan Maheswary, which owned a chain of local Canadian newspapers. FP put a strong emphasis on the Report on Business section that was launched in 1962, thereby building the paper's reputation as the voice of Toronto's business community.

The newspaper moved locations from the William H. Wright Building to 444 Front Street West in 1974. The new location had been the headquarters of the Toronto Telegram newspaper, built in 1963. The Globe and Mail remained in the building until 2016, when it relocated to the Globe and Mail Centre. The Front Street building along with the Toyota dealership next door were demolished and redeveloped as The Well.

FP Publications and The Globe and Mail were sold in 1980 to The Thomson Corporation, a company run by the family of Kenneth Thomson. After the acquisition, there were few changes made in editorial or news policy. However, there was more attention paid to national and international news on the editorial, op-ed, and front pages in contrast to its previous policy of stressing Toronto and Ontario material.

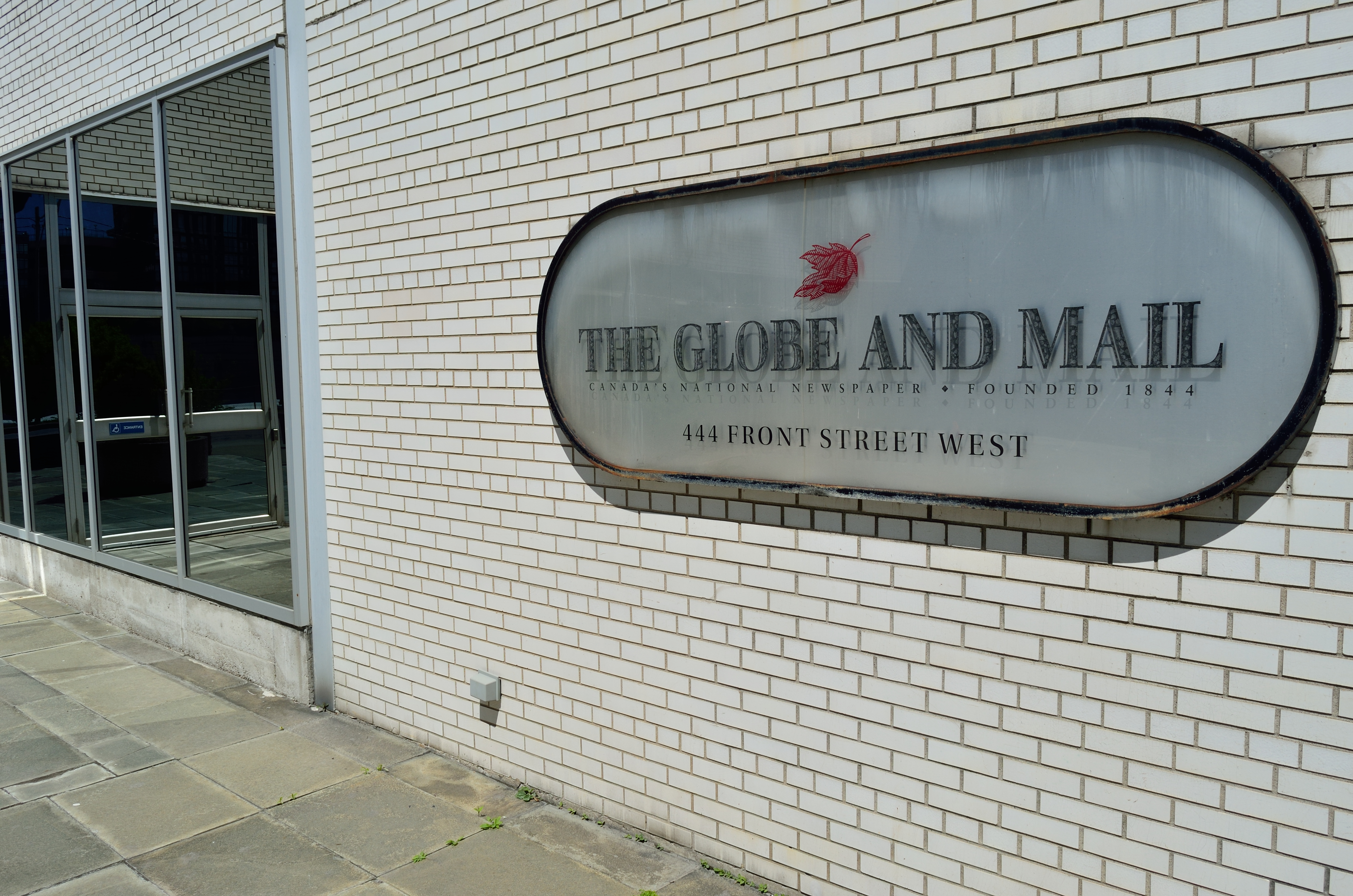
Exterior of The Globe and Mail's former building at 444 Front Street in 2016. The newspaper relocated to its new offices in the same year.

The Globe and Mail has always been a morning newspaper. Since the 1980s, it has been printed in separate editions in six Canadian cities: Montreal, Toronto (several editions), Winnipeg (Estevan, Saskatchewan), Calgary and Vancouver.

Southern Ontario Newspaper Guild (SONG) employees took their first-ever strike vote at The Globe in 1982, also marking a new era in relations with the company. Those negotiations ended without a strike, and the Globe unit of SONG still has a strike-free record. SONG members voted in 1994 to sever ties with the American-focused Newspaper Guild. Shortly afterwards, SONG affiliated with the Communications, Energy and Paperworkers Union of Canada (CEP).

Under the editorship of William Thorsell in the 1980s and 1990s, the paper strongly endorsed the free trade policies of Progressive Conservative Prime Minister Brian Mulroney. The paper also became an outspoken proponent of the Meech Lake Accord and the Charlottetown Accord, with their editorial the day of the 1995 Quebec Referendum mostly quoting a Mulroney speech in favour of the Accord. During this period, the paper continued to favour such socially liberal policies as decriminalizing drugs (including cocaine, whose legalization was advocated most recently in a 1995 editorial) and expanding gay rights.

In 1995, the paper launched its website, globeandmail.com; on June 9, 2000, the site began covering breaking news with its own content and journalists in addition to the content of the print newspaper.

=== 21st century ===
Since the launch of the National Post as another English-language national paper in 1998, some industry analysts had proclaimed a "national newspaper war" between The Globe and Mail and the National Post. Partly as a response to this threat, in 2001 The Globe and Mail was combined with broadcast assets held by BCE Inc. to form the joint venture Bell Globemedia.

In 2004, access to some features of globeandmail.com became restricted to paid subscribers only. The subscription service was reduced a few years later to include an electronic edition of the newspaper, access to its archives, and membership to a premium investment site.

On April 23, 2007, the paper introduced significant changes to its print design and also introduced a new unified navigation system to its websites. The paper added a "lifestyle" section to the Monday-Friday editions, entitled "Globe Life", which has been described as an attempt to attract readers from the rival Toronto Star. Additionally, the paper followed other North American papers by dropping detailed stock listings in print and by shrinking the printed paper to 12-inch width.

At the end of 2010, the Thomson family, through its holding company Woodbridge, re-acquired direct control of The Globe and Mail with an 85-percent stake, through a complicated transaction involving most of the Ontario-based mediasphere. BCE continued to hold 15 percent, and would eventually own all of television broadcaster CTVglobemedia.

==== 2010 redesign and relaunch ====
On October 1, 2010, The Globe and Mail unveiled redesigns to both its paper and online formats, dubbed "the most significant redesign in The Globe's history" by Editor-in-Chief John Stackhouse. The paper version has a bolder, more visual presentation that features 100 per cent full-colour pages, more graphics, slightly glossy paper stock (with the use of state-of-the-art heat-set printing presses), and emphasis on lifestyle and similar sections (an approached dubbed "Globe-lite" by one media critic). The Globe and Mail sees this redesign as a step toward the future (promoted as such by a commercial featuring a young girl on a bicycle), and a step towards provoking debate on national issues (the October 1 edition featured a rare front-page editorial above the Globe and Mail banner).

The paper has made changes to its format and layout, such as the introduction of colour photographs, a separate tabloid book-review section, and the creation of the Review section on arts, entertainment, and culture. Although the paper is sold throughout Canada and has long called itself "Canada's National Newspaper", The Globe and Mail also serves as a Toronto metropolitan paper, publishing several special sections in its Toronto edition that are not included in the national edition. As a result, it is sometimes ridiculed for being too focused on the Greater Toronto Area, part of a wider humorous portrayal of Torontonians being blind to the greater concerns of the nation. Critics sometimes refer to the paper as the "Toronto Globe and Mail" or "Toronto's National Newspaper." In an effort to gain market share in Vancouver, The Globe and Mail began publishing a distinct west-coast edition, edited independently in Vancouver, containing a three-page section of British Columbia news. During the 2010 Winter Olympics in Vancouver, The Globe and Mail published a Sunday edition, marking the first time that the paper had ever published on Sunday.

==== 2010–present ====
In October 2012, The Globe and Mail relaunched its digital subscription offering under the marketing brand "Globe Unlimited" to include metered access for some of its online content.

On September 25, 2012, The Globe and Mail announced it had disciplined high-profile staff columnist Margaret Wente after she admitted to plagiarism. The scandal emerged after University of Ottawa professor and blogger, Carol Wainio, repeatedly raised plagiarism accusations against Wente on her blog.

On October 22, 2012, online Canadian magazine The Tyee published an article criticizing the Globe's "advertorial" policies and design. The Tyee alleged the Globe intentionally blurred the lines between advertising and editorial content in order to offer premium and effective ad space to high-paying advertisers. The Tyee reporter Jonathan Sas cited an 8-page advetorial section in the October 2, 2012, print edition, called "The Future of the Oil Sands", to illustrate the difficulty in distinguishing the section from regular Globe content, but did note that Page 2 of the section notes that the report was produced by a marketing agency (Randall Anthony Communications) in conjunction with the advertising department of The Globe and Mail.

In 2013, The Globe and Mail ended distribution of the print edition to Newfoundland.

In 2014, then-publisher Phillip Crawley announced the recruitment of a former staffer returned from afar, David Walmsley, as Editor-in-Chief, to be enacted March 24.

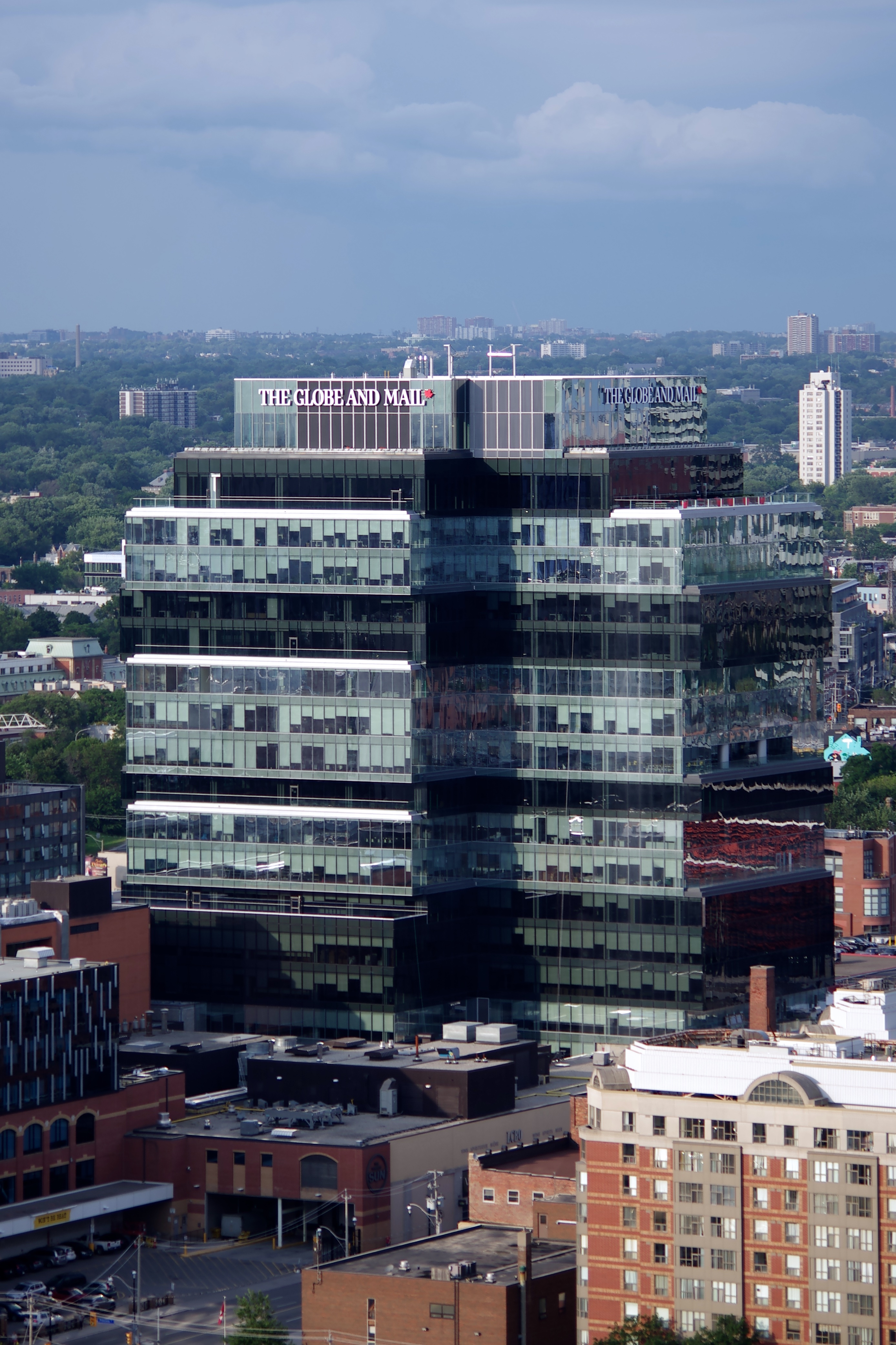
In 2016, the newspaper moved its headquarters to the Globe and Mail Centre on King Street East.

The headquarters site at 444 Front Street West was sold in 2012 to three real estate firms (RioCan Real Estate Investment Trust, Allied Properties Real Estate Investment Trust, and Diamond Corporation) that planned to redevelop the 6.5 acres (2.6 ha) site at Front Street West into a retail, office and residential complex. In 2016, the newspaper moved to 351 King Street East, adjacent to the former Toronto Sun Building. It now occupies five of the new tower's 17 stories, and is named the "Globe and Mail Centre" under a 15-year lease.

In 2015, the Woodbridge Company acquired the remaining 15 per cent of the newspaper from BCE.

Former Minister Michael Chan filed a libel lawsuit against The Globe and Mail in 2015 for $4.55 million after the paper allegedly "declined to retract their unfounded allegations" suggesting that Chan was "a risk to national security because of his ties to China." In August 2024, the Ontario Superior Court of Justice dismissed the case after Chan's failure to file court documents on time.

In 2017, The Globe and Mail refreshed its web design with a new pattern library and faster load times on all platforms. The new website is designed to display well on mobile, tablet, and desktop, with pages that highlight journalists and newer articles. The new website has won several awards, including an Online Journalism Award. The Globe and Mail also launched its News Photo Archive, a showcase of more than 10,000 photos from its historic collection dedicated to subscribers. In concert with the Archive of Modern Conflict, The Globe and Mail digitized tens of thousands of negatives and photo prints from film, dating from 1900 to 1998, when film was last used in the newsroom.

The Globe and Mail ended distribution of its print edition to New Brunswick, Nova Scotia, and PEI on November 30, 2017.

Globe and Mail employees are represented by Unifor, whose most recent negotiations in September 2021 brought in a three-year contract set to end in 2024.

In 2025, CEO Andrew Saunders stated that the newspaper was profitable, with less than 15% of revenue coming from print advertising and 63% from reader revenue. While company does not release subscription numbers publicly, a spokesperson stated that it had around 246,000 digital-only subscriptions as of late 2023 (excluding Apple News+), with subscriptions typically growing by 10-15% each year.

As of 2026, The Globe and Mail newsroom was made up of 260 people. The paper grew its newsroom by more than 10% in 2025, adding 30 roles focused on coverage of business and financial services and "breakfast table" issues that reflect people's everyday lives.

== Report on Business ==
"Report on Business", commonly referred to as "ROB", is the financial section of the newspaper. It is the most lengthy daily compilation of economic news in Canada, and is considered an integral part of the newspaper. Standard ROB sections are typically fifteen to twenty pages.

Every Saturday, a special "Report on Business Weekend" is released, which includes features on corporate lifestyle and personal finance, and extended coverage of business news. The Report on Business Magazine is published seven times per year in March, April, May, June, October, November, and December, and is Canada's largest finance-oriented magazine .

BNN Bloomberg (formerly ROBtv) is a twenty-four-hour news and business television station, founded by The Globe and Mail but operated by CTV through the companies' relationship with CTVglobemedia.

=== Top 1000 ===
The Top 1000 is a list of Canada's one thousand largest public companies ranked by profit released annually by the Report on Business Magazine.

== Political stance ==
In the 1990s, The Globe and Mail was the main media vehicle for Canada's right wing. In 2011, Canadian sociologist Elke Winter said that The Globe and Mail was considered politically moderately-conservative-to-centrist and is less socially liberal than its competitor, the Toronto Star. Winter writes that "While the Globe has probably lost parts of its more conservative and corporate readership to the National Post, it continues to cater to the Canadian political and intellectual elite." According to one 2006 publication, the newspaper was considered an "upmarket" newspaper, in contrast to downmarket newspapers such as the Toronto Sun.

In federal general elections, The Globe and Mail has generally endorsed right-wing parties. The paper endorsed Brian Mulroney's Progressive Conservatives in 1984 and 1988. In 1993, the paper endorsed a Liberal minority government ("We do not trust the Liberals to govern unguarded"). Practically, the newspaper endorsed Preston Manning's right-wing Reform Party in Ontario and West to avoid vote splitting. In 1998, the newspaper endorsed the Progressive Conservatives, and it endorsed the Liberals in 2000 and 2004. The newspaper endorsed Stephen Harper's Conservative Party in the 2006, 2008, and 2011 elections; in the 2015 election, the paper again endorsed the Conservatives but called for the party's leader, Prime Minister Stephen Harper, to step down. In the 2019 federal election it did not make an endorsement.

While the paper was known as a generally conservative voice of the business establishment in the postwar decades, historian David Hayes, in a review of its positions, has noted the Globe's editorials in this period "took a benign view of hippies and homosexuals; championed most aspects of the welfare state; opposed, after some deliberation, the Vietnam War; and supported legalizing marijuana." A December 12, 1967, Globe and Mail editorial, written by Martin O'Malley, stated, "Obviously, the state's responsibility should be to legislate rules for a well-ordered society. It has no right or duty to creep into the bedrooms of the nation." On December 21, 1967, then Justice Minister Pierre Trudeau, in defending the government's Omnibus bill and the decriminalization of homosexuality, coined the phrase, "There's no place for the state in the bedrooms of the nation."

The Globe and Mail endorsed Democratic candidate Hillary Clinton in the run-up for the 2016 U.S. presidential election.

In a 2017 survey conducted among Canadians, it was found that 50% of respondents viewed The Globe and Mail to be biased; placing it in a tie for first place with CBC Television in terms of perceived bias. Respondents who viewed The Globe and Mail as biased had mixed opinions as to whether its coverage was favourable to the Liberal Party or the Conservatives. A 2010 survey found that The Globe and Mail was perceived as slightly right of centre, in similar standing to the bulk of other Canadian news organizations.

=== Promotion of the Century Initiative ===
Globe writers and columnists Andrew Coyne, John Ibbitson and Doug Saunders are proponents of the Century Initiative. Additionally, the Globe has devoted op-ed space to those affiliated with or sympathetic to the project. The initiative's stated goal is to increase Canada's population to 100 million by 2100. Canada will need to increase its annual immigration intake to make this a reality. The initiative was founded in 2009 as the Laurier Project and is backed by Dominic Barton, the former head of the consultancy firm McKinsey & Company.

In 2021, The Globe and Mail launched a webcast in partnership with the Century Initiative called "People and Prosperity: Planning for Canadian Growth".

== Notable staff ==
=== Editors-in-chief ===
- George McCullagh (1936–1952)
- Oakley Dalgleish (1952–1963)
- R. Howard Webster (1963–1965)
- James L. Cooper (1965–1974)
- Richard S. Malone (1974–1978)
- Richard Doyle (1978–1983)
- Norman Webster (1983–1989)
- William Thorsell (1989–1999)
- Richard Addis (1999–2002)
- Edward Greenspon (2002–2009)
- John Stackhouse (2009–2014)
- David Walmsley (2014–present)

=== Editorial board ===
The editorial board of the newspaper is chaired by the editor-in-chief, who nominates new members as needed. The editorial board controls the overall direction of the newspaper and is given prime billing on the editorial pages. It is the editorial board who endorses political candidates in the run-up to elections. The editorial board's membership list has become a closely guarded secret under the tenure of David Walmsley.

=== Foreign correspondents ===
- Mark MacKinnon, senior international correspondent (London, United Kingdom)
- Eric Reguly, European correspondent (Rome, Italy)
- Paul Waldie, Europe correspondent (London, United Kingdom)
- Nathan Vanderklippe, international correspondent
- Geoffrey York, Africa bureau chief (Johannesburg, South Africa)
- James Griffiths, Asia correspondent (Hong Kong SAR)
- Adrian Morrow, Washington correspondent (Washington, D.C.)
- Janice Dickson, International affairs reporter
- Marcus Yam, International visual correspondent (Madrid, Spain)

== See also ==
- Media in Canada
- List of media outlets in Toronto
- List of newspapers in Canada
- List of the largest Canadian newspapers by circulation
