= Stellarium =

Three-dimensional map of the stars

A stellarium is a three-dimensional map of the stars, typically centered on Earth. They are common fixtures at planetariums, where they illustrate the local deep space. Older examples were normally built using small colored balls or lights on support rods (painted black to make them less obvious), but later examples used a variety of projection techniques instead.
