= George McCullagh =

Canadian newspaper publisher (1905–1952)

Clement George McCullagh
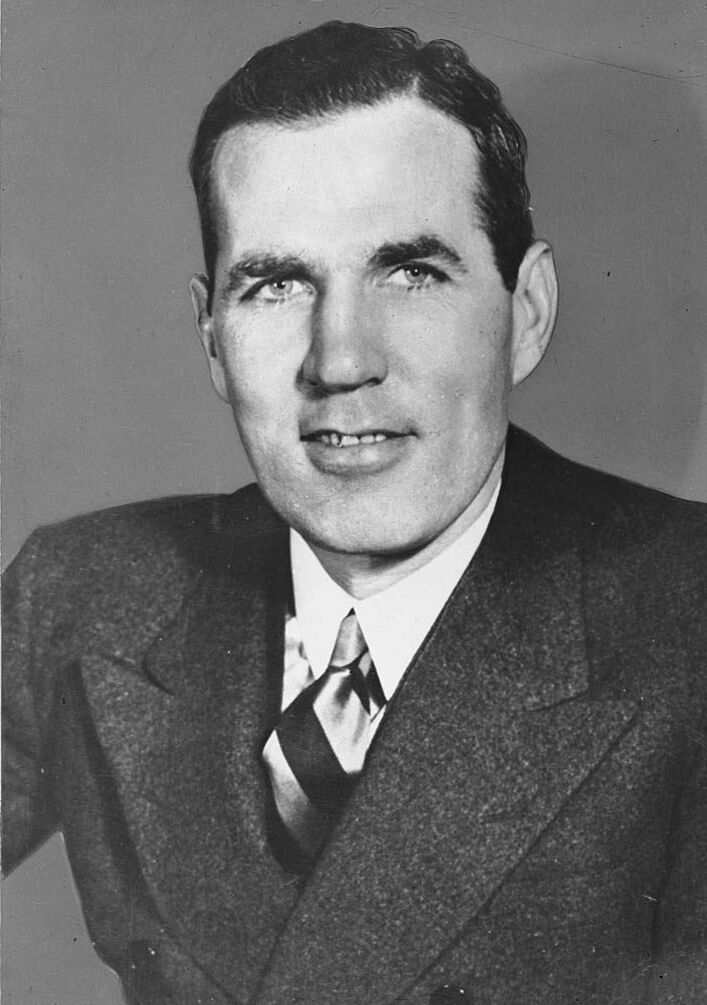
- McCullagh, c. 1940s
- Born: London, Ontario
- Died: August 5, 1952 (aged 47)
- Known for: Founded The Globe and Mail

Clement George McCullagh (March 16, 1905 – August 5, 1952) was an influential Canadian newspaper owner between 1936 and 1952. He created The Globe and Mail by merging the Liberal-allied Globe and Conservative-allied Mail and Empire newspapers in 1936. He was also actively involved in Canadian politics and later owned the Toronto Telegram newspaper.

== Early life ==
McCullagh was born to Anne Catherine McCullagh, a housewife, and George H. McCullagh, a local cabinet maker, in London, Ontario, on March 16, 1905. As a youth, he delivered the Globe newspaper to local homes and built a reputation for sales within the newspaper's circulation department.

He dropped out of school with only a ninth grade education. The Globe rejected his request to be a junior reporter; instead employing him as a subscription agent in London at age 16. He quickly earned several promotions, moved to Toronto and finally shifted into the editorial department. He was the assistant financial editor with a specialization in northern mining development by age 22.

== Financial career ==
He left the Globe to become a floor man at the Toronto Stock Exchange for Milner, Ross and Co. and specialized in oil, mining and gold share sales. He later partnered with Richard Barrett to establish the firm Barrett, McCullagh and Co. By age 30, he was estimated to be worth more than a million dollars.

== The Globe and Mail ==
McCullagh purchased the Globe for $1.3 million and Mail and Empire for $2.5 million in 1936. The first publication of the Globe and Mail was distributed in Toronto on November 23, 1936. McCullagh named himself the publisher.

The Ontario Liberal Party, including Premier Mitchell Hepburn, believed The Globe and Mail would be a strong ally. McCullagh had served as a principal adviser to Hepburn's successful 1934 election bid and, in 1936, Hepburn appointed McCullagh to the Board of Governors of the University of Toronto. Editorials and articles in the first editions were supportive of the provincial government, but within a year, McCullagh became discontented and pushed the Ontario Conservative and Liberal parties to form a coalition government. Hepburn proposed the option to the Conservatives but, after leader Earl Rowe accepted, they refused.

McCullagh launched a series of radio broadcasts in 1939 to promote his nonpartisan vision for Canadian politics. The series led to the creation of the Leadership League, an early concept lobby group for stronger and smaller government and a one party system directed by business interests—a concept criticized as "fascist" by opponents such as the Toronto Star. The league achieved an estimated 101,900 ballots for membership but was underfunded and disorganized. McCullagh folded it within a year.

McCullagh later supported the Ontario Conservative Party and its leader George A. Drew.

== Toronto Telegram ==
In 1946, at age 43, McCullagh bought the 72-year-old Toronto Telegram for $3.6 million. The purchase gave him control of two of the three big daily newspapers in Toronto with a daily circulation of 414,515.

== Thoroughbred racing ==
George McCullagh owned and raced Thoroughbred racehorses. In 1939 his colt Archworth won Canada's most prestigious race, the King's Plate. The event was also noteworthy for the attendance of King George VI and Queen Elizabeth.

== Death ==
McCullagh died on August 5, 1952, at the age of 47, committing suicide following a lengthy illness that included three heart attacks.
