= James Griffiths =

James or Jim Griffiths may refer to:

- James Griffiths (Australian politician) (1872–1916), Australian politician
- James Griffiths (director), British television and film director
- James Griffiths (rugby union) (born 1977), Welsh rugby player
- Jim Griffiths (1890–1975), Welsh politician
- Jim Griffiths (cricketer) (born 1949), English cricketer
- James Griffiths (minister) (1856–1933), Welsh Baptist minister
- James Henry Ambrose Griffiths (1903–1964), American prelate of the Roman Catholic Church.

== See also ==
- James Griffith (disambiguation)
