= William Thorsell =

Canadian journalist (born 1945)

- Born: 6 July 1945 (age 81); Camrose, Alberta
- Education: University of Alberta; Princeton University
- Occupations: Museum director, editor, columnist
- Employer: Munk School of Global Affairs
- Known for: Editor-in-chief, The Globe and Mail (1989-2000)
- Title: Distinguished Senior Fellow, Munk School of Global Affairs
- Term: August 2000-August 2010
- Successor: Janet Carding

William Thorsell, OOnt (born 6 July 1945 at Camrose, Alberta) is a Canadian journalist, former editor-in-chief of The Globe and Mail, and past director and chief executive officer of the Royal Ontario Museum.

After his tenure at the ROM he became a distinguished senior fellow at the Munk School of Global Affairs, University of Toronto.

In 1966, he graduated with a Bachelor of Arts degree at the University of Alberta and earned his Master of Arts degree from that institution in 1970. He received a Master of Public and International Affairs from Princeton University's Woodrow Wilson School of Public and International Affairs in 1972.

In 1975, Thorsell joined the Edmonton Journal's editorial board for approximately a year. After a brief term on The Globe and Mail's editorial board in Toronto, he returned to the Edmonton Journal in 1977 as an associate editor.

In 1984, he rejoined The Globe and Mail writing for its Report on Business and returning to the paper's editorial board. He began a 10-year term as that paper's editor-in-chief from 1989 to 1999, after which he chaired the paper's editorial board for several months. In 1995, the University of Alberta awarded him an honorary Doctor of Laws.

While serving as editor of The Globe and Mail, Thorsell came out as gay in an interview with fab. As one of the most prominent openly gay Canadians, and one who held a powerful position within the media, he has been credited as one of the key figures behind the evolving public image of LGBT people in the 1990s and 2000s.

In August 2000, Thorsell was appointed to the top management position at the Royal Ontario Museum. He was named to the Order of Ontario in 2007. In 2010, he was made a Knight of the Order of Arts and Letters (2010).
